= Hedbergia longiflora =

Scientific classification
- Kingdom: Plantae
- Clade: Tracheophytes
- Clade: Angiosperms
- Clade: Eudicots
- Clade: Asterids
- Order: Lamiales
- Family: Orobanchaceae
- Tribe: Rhinantheae
- Genus: Hedbergia
- Species: H. longiflora

Binomial name
- Hedbergia longiflora A. Fleischm. & Heubl

Synonyms
- Bartsia longiflora Hochst. ex Benth.

Species of flowering plant in the broomrape family

Hedbergia longiflora, formerly Bartsia longiflora, is a species of flowering plants in the family Orobanchaceae.

It is an afromontane species, restricted to the mountains of northeastern Africa.

A subspecies, Hedbergia longiflora subsp. macrophylla Hedberg, has also been described.

== Phylogeny ==
The phylogeny of the genera of Rhinantheae has been explored using molecular characters. Hedbergia longiflora groups with Hedbergia decurva and Hedbergia abyssinica into a Hedbergia clade nested within the core Rhinantheae. These three taxa share evolutionary affinities with genera Tozzia, Bellardia, Neobartsia, Parentucellia, and Odontites.

Genus-level cladogram of tribe Rhinantheae.

- Rhinantheae
  - Melampyrum
  - - - Rhynchocorys
      - - Lathraea
        - Rhinanthus
    - Core Rhinantheae
      - Bartsia sensu stricto (Bartsia alpina)
      - - Euphrasia
        - - Hedbergia
            (including Bartsia decurva + B. longiflora)
          - Tozzia
          - Odontites sensu lato
            (including Bartsiella
            and Bornmuellerantha)
          - - Bellardia
            - - Neobartsia
                (New World Bartsia)
              - Parentucellia

The cladogram has been reconstructed from nuclear DNA (ribosomal ITS) and plastid DNA (rps16 intron, trnK, and other regions) molecular characters.
