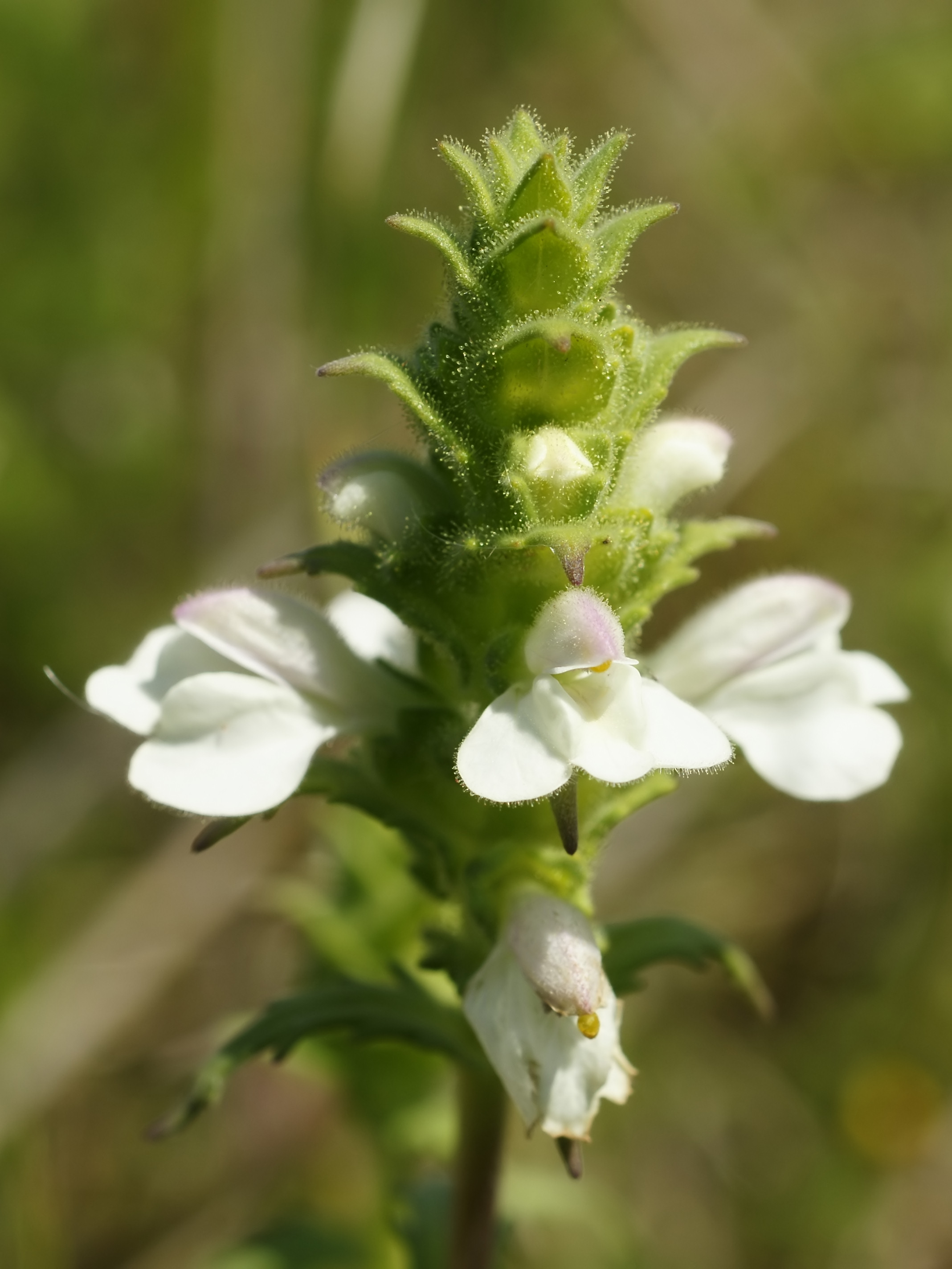

Scientific classification
- Kingdom: Plantae
- Clade: Tracheophytes
- Clade: Angiosperms
- Clade: Eudicots
- Clade: Asterids
- Order: Lamiales
- Family: Orobanchaceae
- Tribe: Rhinantheae
- Genus: Bellardia; All.
- Species: B. trixago

Binomial name
- Bellardia trixago (L.) All.

Synonyms
- Genus: Lasiopera Hoffmanns. & Link; Trixago Steven; Species: Alectorolophus trixago (L.) M.Bieb.; Bartsia bicolor DC.; Bartsia capensis (L.) Spreng.; Bartsia maxima Pers.; Bartsia rhinanthoides Hochst. ex Benth.; Bartsia trixago L.; Bartsia versicolor (Lam.) Pers.; Bellardia carnea (Griseb.) Wettst.; Bellardia trixago subvar. alba Rouy; Bellardia trixago subvar. bicolor (DC.) Rouy; Bellardia trixago subvar. flaviflora Rouy; Bellardia trixago var. flaviflora (Boiss.) Maire; Bellardia trixago var. maxima Rouy; Bellardia trixago f. stricta Esteve; Bellardia trixago var. versicolor (Lam.) Cout.; Bellardia trixago subvar. versicolor (Lam.) Rouy; Buchnera africana L.; Euphrasia trixago (L.) Vis.; Euphrasia versicolor Bubani, nom. illeg.; Glossostylis abyssinica Hochst. ex A.DC.; Lasiopera rhinanthina Hoffmanns. & Link; Rhinanthus bicolor Poir.; Rhinanthus capensis L.; Rhinanthus creticus F.Dietr.; Rhinanthus maritimus Lam.; Rhinanthus maximus Willd., nom. illeg.; Rhinanthus trixago (L.) L.; Rhinanthus versicolor Lam.; Trixago apula Steven; Trixago apula var. flaviflora Boiss.; Trixago apula var. lutea Lange; Trixago apula var. versicolor (Lam.) Lange; Trixago carnea Griseb.; Trixago maxima (Pers.) Webb & Berthel.; Trixago rhinanthina Link ex Spreng.; Trixago versicolor (Lam.) Webb & Berthel.

= Bellardia trixago =

Species of flowering plant

Bellardia trixago is a species of flowering plant in the family Orobanchaceae. It was formerly classified in the family Scrophulariaceae. The only member of the monotypic genus Bellardia, it is known as trixago bartsia or Mediterranean lineseed. This plant is native to the Mediterranean Basin, but it is known in other places with similar climates, such as California and parts of Chile, where it is an introduced species and noxious weed.

== Description ==
Bellardia trixago is an erect plant often reaching over half a meter in height. Its foliage is rich green and dotted with glands and hairs. The sawtoothed leaves extend about halfway up the plant, with the upper half of the stem being occupied with a stout inflorescence which narrows to a point. The inflorescence has rows of leaflike bracts, between which emerge showy purple and white lipped, hooded flowers, each over two centimeters wide. The fruit is a smooth, green capsule. Mediterranean lineseed, like other broomrapes, is parasitic; this species is hemiparasitic in that it is green and photosynthetic but also taps into the roots of other plants to extract nutrients.

== Phylogeny ==
The phylogeny of the genera of Rhinantheae has been explored using molecular characters. Bellardia belongs to the core Rhinantheae. Bellardia is closely related to Parentucellia, to some Bartsia taxa, and to Odontites. In turn, these genera share phylogenetic affinities with Tozzia and Hedbergia, and then with Euphrasia and Bartsia.

Genus-level cladogram of tribe Rhinantheae.

- Rhinantheae
  - Melampyrum
  - - - Rhynchocorys
      - - Lathraea
        - Rhinanthus
    - Core Rhinantheae
      - Bartsia sensu stricto (Bartsia alpina)
      - - Euphrasia
        - - Hedbergia
            (including Bartsia decurva + B. longiflora)
          - Tozzia
          - Odontites sensu lato
            (including Bartsiella
            and Bornmuellerantha)
          - - Bellardia
            - - Neobartsia
                (New World Bartsia)
              - Parentucellia

The cladogram has been reconstructed from nuclear and plastid DNA molecular characters (ITS, rps16 intron and trnK region).

== Etymology ==
The genus name Bellardia is a taxonomic patronym in honor of Carlo Antonio Lodovico Bellardi (1741–1826), an Italian botanist from Piedmont.

The species name trixago has two possible etymologies.

- It derives from the Ancient Greek word θρίξ (thríx), meaning "hair", and the Latin suffix agoused to indicate a property, and refers to the glandular-hairy characteristic of the plant.
- It derives from the Ancient Greek word τριξός, τρισσός, or τριττός (trixós, trissós, or trittós), meaning "triple", and refers to the trilobate lower lip of the flower. It is also the old Latin name of germanders (genus Teucrium).

== Distribution and habitat ==
This plant is native to the Mediterranean Basin, but it is known in other places with similar climates, such as California and parts of Chile, where it is an introduced species and noxious weed.
