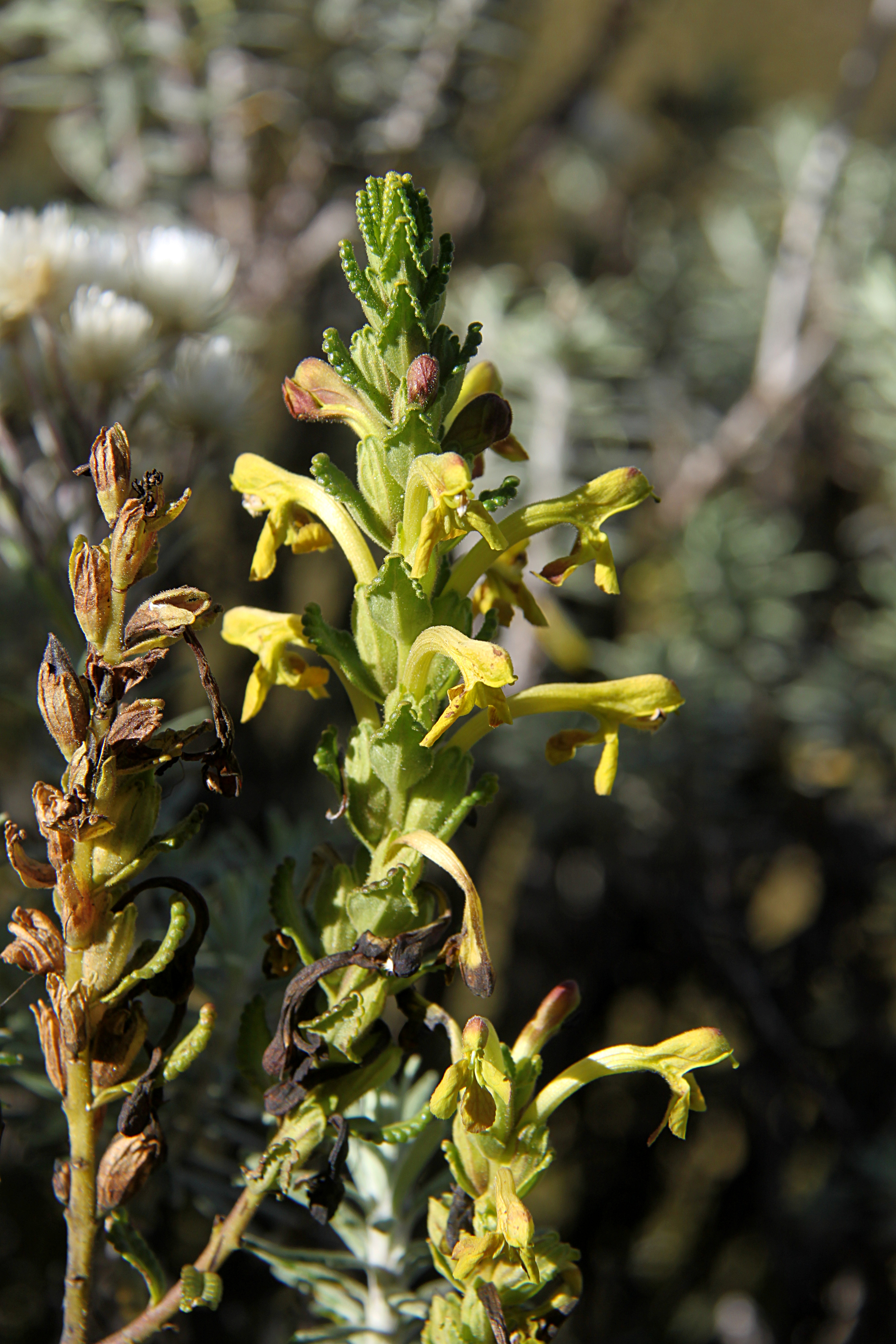

Scientific classification
- Kingdom: Plantae
- Clade: Tracheophytes
- Clade: Angiosperms
- Clade: Eudicots
- Clade: Asterids
- Order: Lamiales
- Family: Orobanchaceae
- Tribe: Rhinantheae
- Genus: Hedbergia
- Species: H. decurva

Binomial name
- Hedbergia decurva A. Fleischm. & Heubl

Synonyms
- Bartsia decurva Hochst. ex Benth.

= Hedbergia decurva =

Species of flowering plant in the broomrape family

Hedbergia decurva, formerly Bartsia decurva, is a hemiparasitic species of flowering plants in the family Orobanchaceae.

== Description ==
Hedbergia decurva is a shrub covered in sticky glandular hairs and few non-glandular hairs. It reaches 50–200 cm (20–79 in) in height, having thin, woody, upright, sparsely branching stems. The mostly upright, narrowly ovate seated leaves of 8–36 mm (0.31–1.42 in) long, have rounded teeth along the margins that are mostly rolled downwards, and are set in opposite pairs. The shortly stalked flowers are set in a raceme towards the tip of the stems in the axils of leaflike bracts. The sepals are merged into a calyx with 4 lobes with deeper incisions on the midline and shallower incisions left and right. The yellow to yellowish brown petals are merged into a strongly mirror-symmetric corolla, with a long, in the upper part distinctly curved tube, topped by a helmet-shaped upper lip that encloses the anthers and a spreading, three-lobed lower lip that has two bulges in front of the throat of the tube. The filaments of the 4 stamens have largely merged with the upper lip of the corolla and are topped by shaggy anthers that each have 2 district spines at their lower end. The style is on top of a shaggy ovary and tipped by a club-shaped stigma. The narrowly elliptical seeds are 0.6–1.9 mm (0.024–0.075 in) long, with several ribs along their length. The species probably has 14 pairs of homologous chromosomes (2n=28).

=== Differences with related species ===
Hedbergia decurva can be distinguished in having a curved upper corolla tube and spines on the lower end of the anthers, whereas Hedbergia longiflora has a straight corolla tube and acute but not spined anthers.

== Distribution ==
Hedbergia decurva occurs in the high mountains of Ethiopia, eastern Uganda, Kenya and Tanzania, above approximately 2,500 m (1.6 mi) where it grows in ericaceous and alpine vegetations.

== Phylogeny ==
The phylogeny of the genera of Rhinantheae has been explored using molecular characters. Hedbergia decurva groups with Hedbergia longiflora and Hedbergia abyssinica into a Hedbergia clade nested within the core Rhinantheae. These three taxa share evolutionary affinities with genera Tozzia, Bellardia, Neobartsia, Parentucellia, and Odontites.

Genus-level cladogram of tribe Rhinantheae.

- Rhinantheae
  - Melampyrum
  - - - Rhynchocorys
      - - Lathraea
        - Rhinanthus
    - Core Rhinantheae
      - Bartsia sensu stricto (Bartsia alpina)
      - - Euphrasia
        - - Hedbergia
            (including Bartsia decurva + B. longiflora)
          - Tozzia
          - Odontites sensu lato
            (including Bartsiella
            and Bornmuellerantha)
          - - Bellardia
            - - Neobartsia
                (New World Bartsia)
              - Parentucellia

The cladogram has been reconstructed from nuclear DNA (ribosomal ITS) and plastid DNA (rps16 intron, trnK, and other regions) molecular characters.
