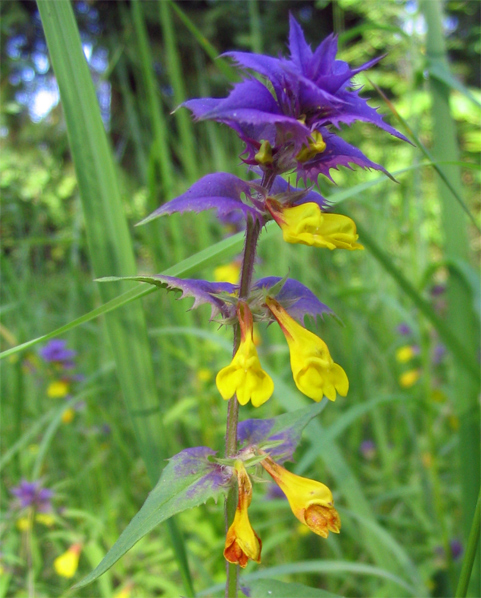
- Melampyrum nemorosum

Scientific classification
- Kingdom: Plantae
- Clade: Tracheophytes
- Clade: Angiosperms
- Clade: Eudicots
- Clade: Asterids
- Order: Lamiales
- Family: Orobanchaceae
- Tribe: Rhinantheae
- Genus: Melampyrum; L.

Species
- about 20, see text.

= Melampyrum =

Genus of flowering plants in the broomrape family

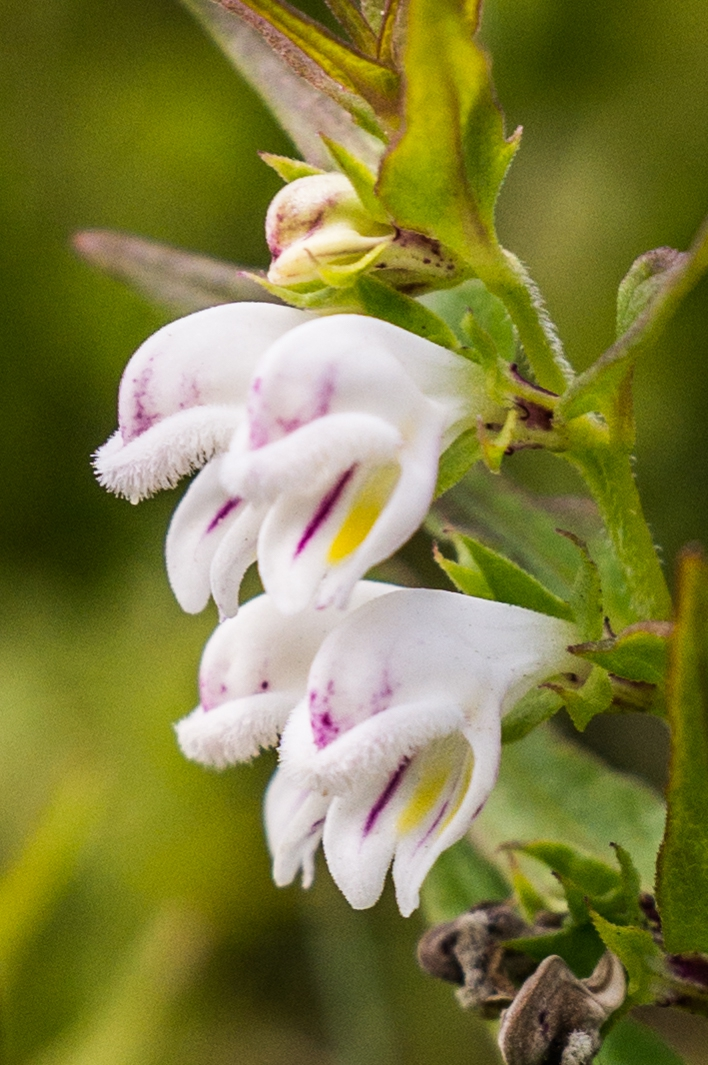
Melampyrum saxosum

Melampyrum is a genus of about 20 species of herbaceous flowering plants in the family Orobanchaceae known commonly as cow wheat. They are native to temperate regions of the Northern Hemisphere. They are hemiparasites on other plants, obtaining water and nutrients from host plants, though some are able to survive on their own without parasitising other plants.

Melampyrum species are used as food plants by the larvae of some Lepidoptera species, including the mouse moth (Amphipyra tragopoginis).

== Phylogeny ==
The phylogeny of the genera of Rhinantheae has been explored using molecular characters. Melampyrum appears as a distant relative of other genera of Rhinantheae. It is the sister group of two clades: (i) Rhynchocorys, Lathraea, and Rhinanthus; and (ii) the core Rhinantheae containing Bartsia, Euphrasia, Tozzia, Hedbergia, Bellardia, and Odontites.

Genus-level cladogram of tribe Rhinantheae.

- Rhinantheae
  - Melampyrum
  - - - Rhynchocorys
      - - Lathraea
        - Rhinanthus
    - Core Rhinantheae
      - Bartsia sensu stricto (Bartsia alpina)
      - - Euphrasia
        - - Hedbergia
            (including Bartsia decurva + B. longiflora)
          - Tozzia
          - Odontites sensu lato
            (including Bartsiella
            and Bornmuellerantha)
          - - Bellardia
            - - Neobartsia
                (New World Bartsia)
              - Parentucellia

The cladogram has been reconstructed from nuclear and plastid DNA molecular characters (ITS, rps16 intron and trnK region).

== Taxonomy ==
=== Selected species ===
- Melampyrum arvense (field cow-wheat). Europe.
- Melampyrum cristatum (crested cow-wheat). Europe.
- Melampyrum klebelsbergianum. Asia.
- Melampyrum koreanum. Asia.
- Melampyrum laxum. Asia.
- Melampyrum lineare (narrowleaf cow-wheat). North America.
- Melampyrum nemorosum (wood cow-wheat). Europe.
- Melampyrum pratense (common cow-wheat). Europe.
- Melampyrum roseum. Asia.
- Melampyrum saxosum. Europe.
- Melampyrum sylvaticum (small cow-wheat). Europe.
