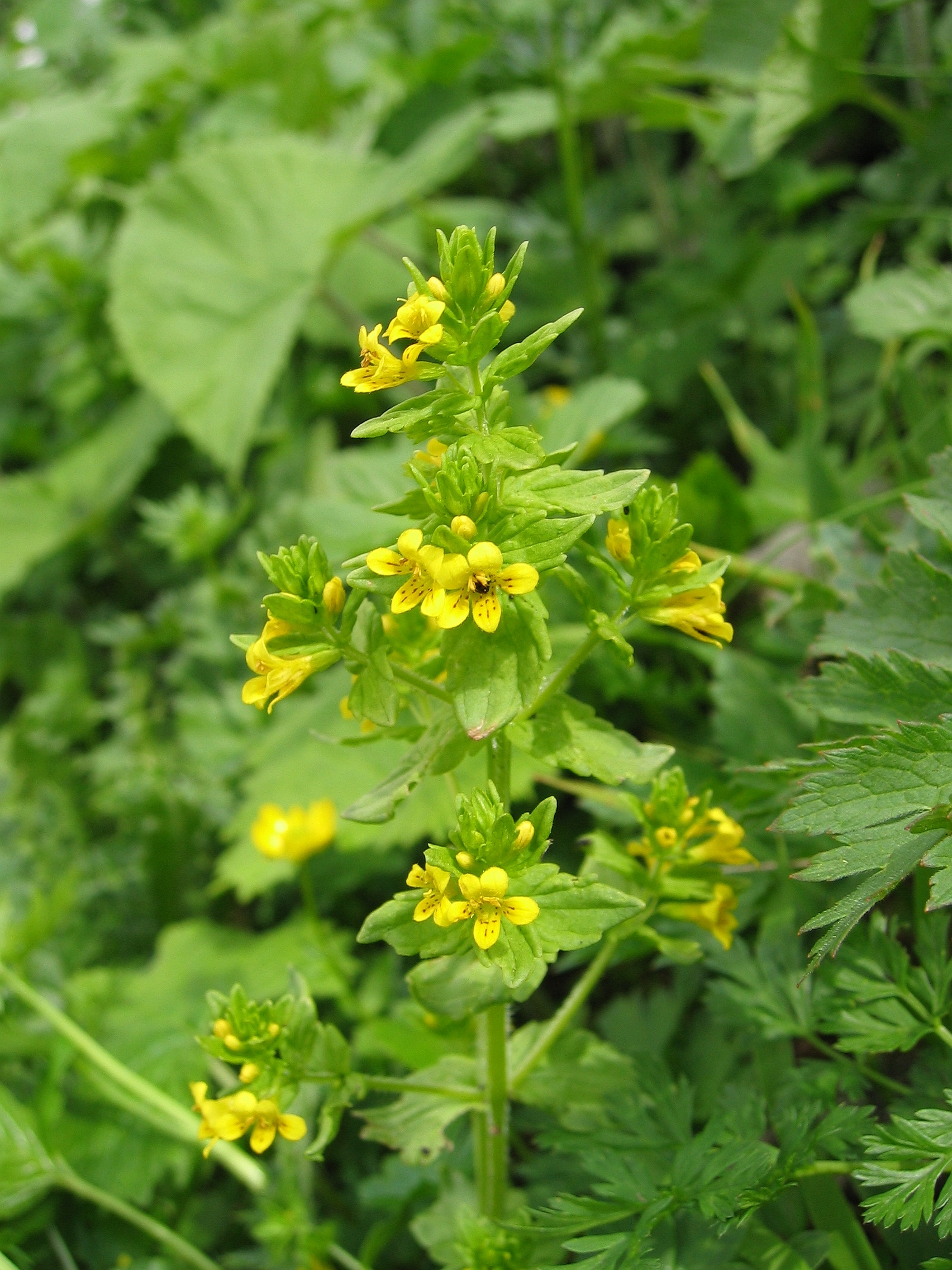

Scientific classification
- Kingdom: Plantae
- Clade: Tracheophytes
- Clade: Angiosperms
- Clade: Eudicots
- Clade: Asterids
- Order: Lamiales
- Family: Orobanchaceae
- Tribe: Rhinantheae
- Genus: Tozzia; L.
- Species: T. alpina

Binomial name
- Tozzia alpina L.

= Tozzia =

Genus of flowering plants in the broomrape family

Tozzia is a monotypic genus of flowering plants within the broomrape family Orobanchaceae. It contains a unique species, Tozzia alpina.

While the plant in its young, vegetative stage is holoparasite, it becomes hemiparasite in its flowering stage. The originality of this species is therefore to combine half and full parasitism.

The range of Tozzia alpina extends from the Pyrenees and the Alps to the Balkans and the Carpathians.

== Description ==
=== Vegetative features ===
Tozzia alpina is a herbaceous, perennial plant, reaching heights of 10 to 50 centimetres (3.9 to 19.7 in). The quadrangular stem is hairless in the lower part, hairy on the edges in the middle and upper part. The simple, bright green leaves are broad, ovate, serrate, with a length of 1 to 3.5 centimeters, a rounded or slightly heart-shaped basis, and a sharp upper end.

=== Reproductive features ===
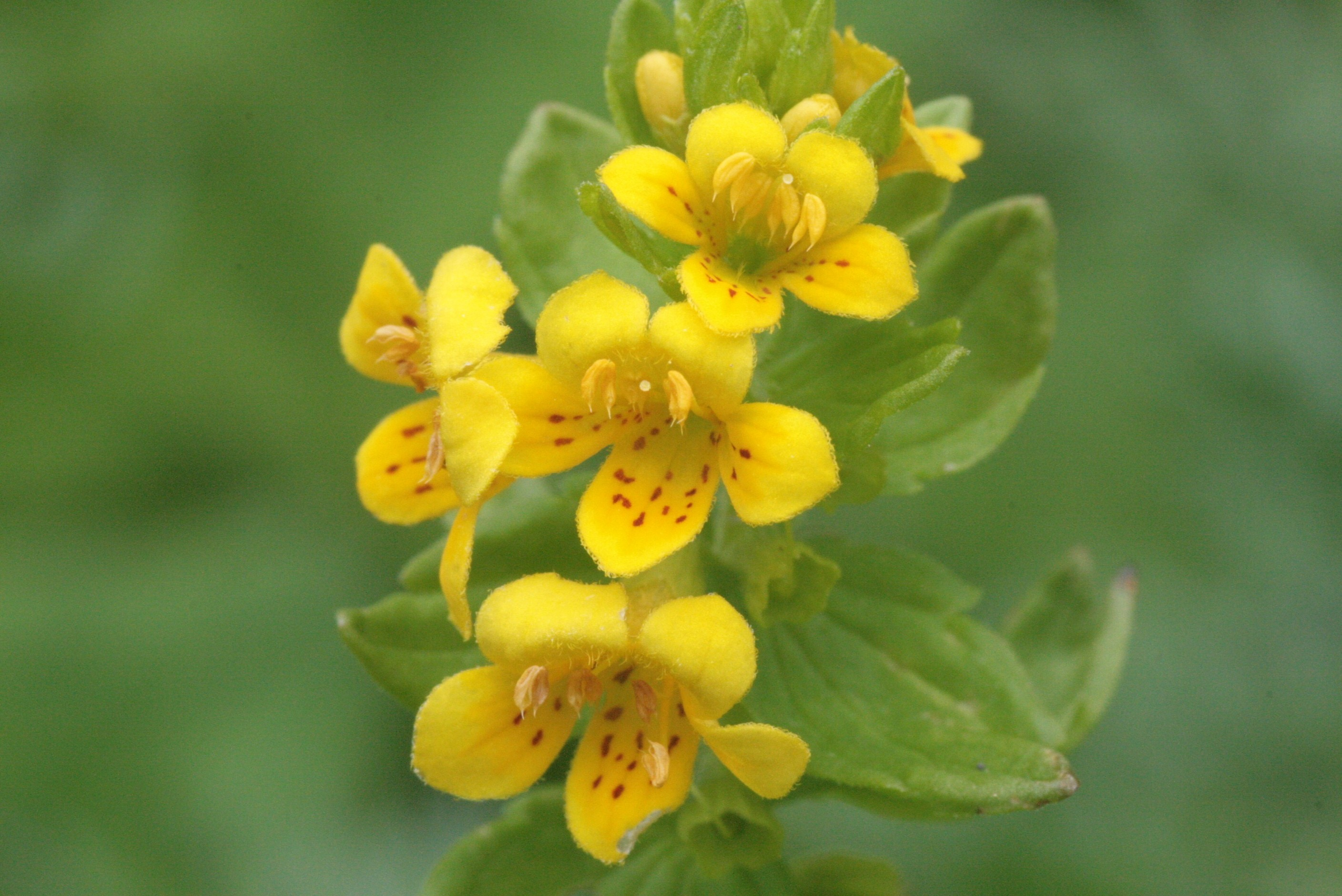
The zygomorphic flowers

The flowering period is from June to August. The hermaphroditic zygomorph flowers are organized into a raceme inflorescence. The bracts have a 3 to 10 millimeters long, thin, one-sided hairy stalk. The fruit is spherical with a diameter of 2 to 2.5 millimeters. The seeds are almost spherical, smooth and white with a round black spot.

== Systematics ==
The genus name Tozzia was given in 1729 by Pier Antonio Micheli. It is a taxonomic patronym in honor of Bruno Tozzi, a monk and later abbot of the monastery Vallombrosa at Reggello in Tuscany, who published in 1703 a work about Tuscan plant species.

The first description of the species Tozzia alpina was made in 1753 by Carl von Linné.

Two subspecies have been described:

- Tozzia alpina L. subsp. alpina, occurring in Spain, France, Switzerland, Germany, Austria, Italy, and former Yugoslavia;
- Tozzia alpina subsp. carpathica (Wolł.) Pawlł. (Syn: Tozzia carpathica Wolł.), occurring in Poland, Czech Republic, Slovakia, Romania, Bulgaria, and Ukraine.

== Phylogeny ==
The phylogeny of the genera of Rhinantheae has been explored using molecular characters. Tozzia belongs to the core Rhinantheae. Tozzia is closely related to Odontites, Bellardia, and Hedbergia. In turn, these genera share phylogenetic affinities with Euphrasia, and then with Bartsia.

Genus-level cladogram of tribe Rhinantheae.

- Rhinantheae
  - Melampyrum
  - - - Rhynchocorys
      - - Lathraea
        - Rhinanthus
    - Core Rhinantheae
      - Bartsia sensu stricto (Bartsia alpina)
      - - Euphrasia
        - - Hedbergia
            (including Bartsia decurva + B. longiflora)
          - Tozzia
          - Odontites sensu lato
            (including Bartsiella
            and Bornmuellerantha)
          - - Bellardia
            - - Neobartsia
                (New World Bartsia)
              - Parentucellia

The cladogram has been reconstructed from nuclear and plastid DNA molecular characters (ITS, rps16 intron and trnK region).

== Ecology ==
Tozzia alpina is a geophyte. In the first year of its growth, Tozzia feeds as holoparasite on large-leaved herbaceous plants, such as species of the genera Rumex, Adenostyles and Petasites. As of the second year, it becomes a hemiparasite with its own assimilation, but still receives nutrients from the host plant.

It thrives at altitudes of 800 to 2,600 meters (2,600 to 8,500 ft). In the Allgäu Alps it rises at the Linkerskopf in Bavaria up to an altitude of 2,200 meters (7,200 ft). It also prefers lime-rich and nutrient-rich, wet-fresh to moist clay soils, with northern exposures.
