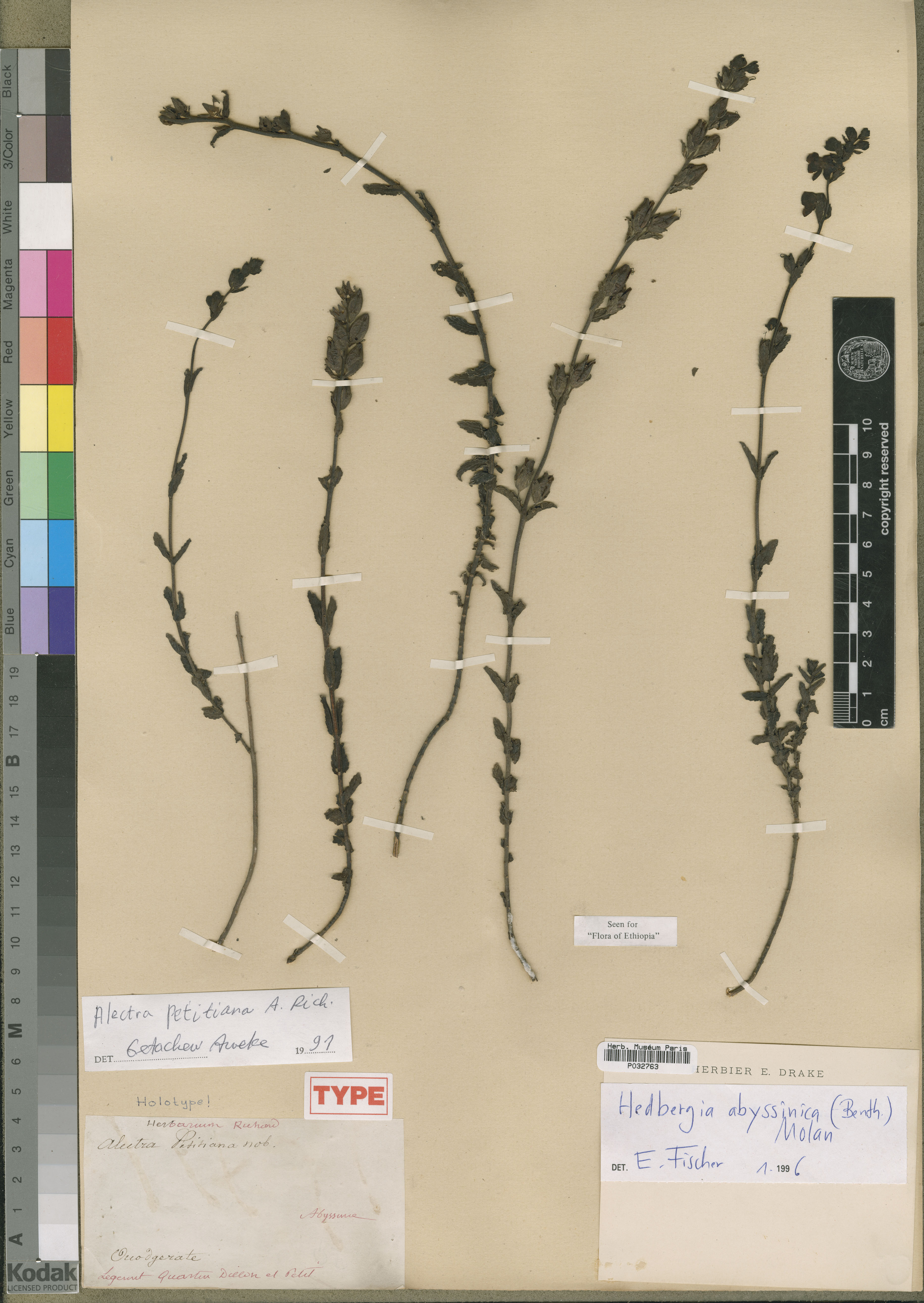
- Holotype of Hedbergia abyssinica (herbarium specimen).

Scientific classification
- Kingdom: Plantae
- Clade: Tracheophytes
- Clade: Angiosperms
- Clade: Eudicots
- Clade: Asterids
- Order: Lamiales
- Family: Orobanchaceae
- Tribe: Rhinantheae
- Genus: Hedbergia; L.
- Species: H. abyssinica

Binomial name
- Hedbergia abyssinica (Benth.) Molau

Synonyms
- Alectra abyssinica A.Rich.; Alectra petitiana A.Rich.; Bartsia abyssinica Benth.; Bartsia abyssinica Hochst. ex A.Rich.; Bartsia abyssinica var. nyikensis (R.E.Fr.) Hedberg & al.; Bartsia abyssinica var. petitiana (A.Rich.) Hedberg & al.; Bartsia elgonensis R.E.Fr.; Bartsia mannii Hemsl.; Bartsia nyikensis R.E.Fr.; Bartsia petitiana (A.Rich.) Hemsl.

= Hedbergia =

Genus of flowering plants in the broomrape family

Hedbergia is a monotypic genus of flowering plants, initially classified in Scrophulariaceae, and now within the broomrape family Orobanchaceae. It contains a unique species, Hedbergia abyssinica. It is an afromontane genus, widespread in grasslands and scrubs of the mountains of tropical Africa, and known from Ethiopia, Zaire, Uganda, Kenya, Tanzania, Malawi, Nigeria, and Cameroons.

The genus name is a taxonomic patronym honoring the Swedish botanist Karl Olov Hedberg.

== Description ==
Hedbergia abyssinica is a 1–2.5 feet (30–76 cm) high, very hispid perennial plant, with subsessile thick leaves, and densely crowded, white to pink or magenta flowers.

== Phylogeny ==
The phylogeny of the genera of Rhinantheae has been explored using molecular characters. Hedbergia belongs to the core Rhinantheae. Hedbergia is closely related to Odontites, Bellardia, and Tozzia. In turn, these genera share phylogenetic affinities with Euphrasia, and then with Bartsia.

Genus-level cladogram of tribe Rhinantheae.

- Rhinantheae
  - Melampyrum
  - - - Rhynchocorys
      - - Lathraea
        - Rhinanthus
    - Core Rhinantheae
      - Bartsia sensu stricto (Bartsia alpina)
      - - Euphrasia
        - - Hedbergia
            (including Bartsia decurva + B. longiflora)
          - Tozzia
          - Odontites sensu lato
            (including Bartsiella
            and Bornmuellerantha)
          - - Bellardia
            - - Neobartsia
                (New World Bartsia)
              - Parentucellia

The cladogram has been reconstructed from nuclear and plastid DNA molecular characters (ITS, rps16 intron and trnK region).
