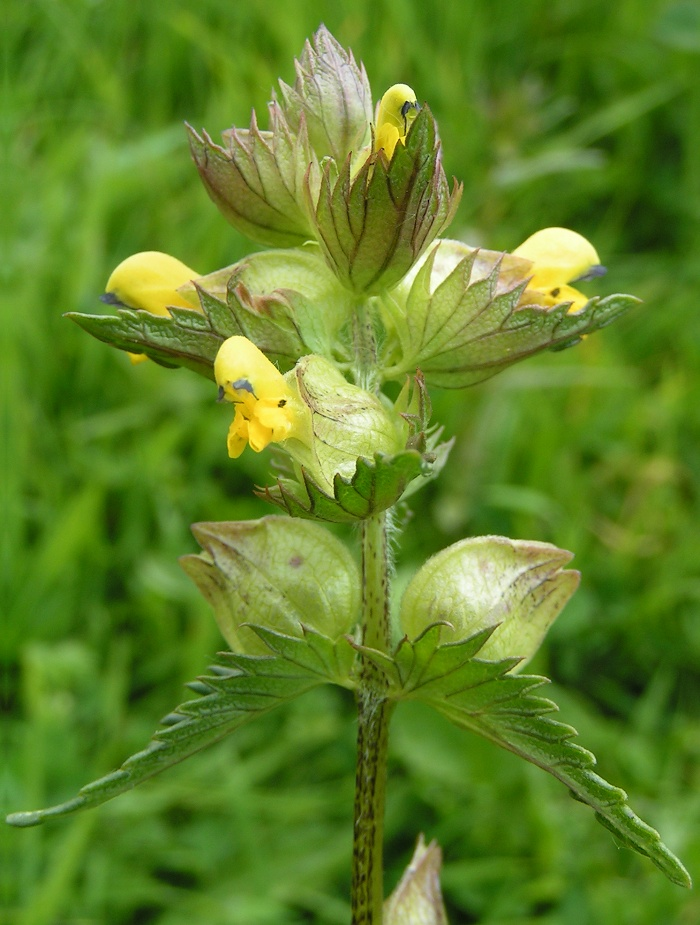
- Rhinanthus minor

Scientific classification
- Kingdom: Plantae
- Clade: Tracheophytes
- Clade: Angiosperms
- Clade: Eudicots
- Clade: Asterids
- Order: Lamiales
- Family: Orobanchaceae
- Tribe: Rhinantheae
- Genus: Rhinanthus; L.

Species
- See text

= Rhinanthus =

Genus of flowering plants in the broomrape family

Rhinanthus is a genus of annual hemiparasitic herbaceous plants in the family Orobanchaceae, formerly classified in the family Scrophulariaceae. Its species are commonly known as rattles. The genus consists of about 30 to 40 species found in Europe, northern Asia, and North America, with the greatest species diversity (28 species) in Europe.

== Phylogeny ==
The phylogeny of the genera of Rhinantheae has been explored using molecular characters. Rhinanthus is the sister genus to Lathraea, and then to Rhynchocorys. These three genera share phylogenetic affinities with members of the core Rhinantheae: Bartsia, Euphrasia, Tozzia, Hedbergia, Bellardia, and Odontites. Melampyrum appears as a more distant relative.

Genus-level cladogram of tribe Rhinantheae.

- Rhinantheae
  - Melampyrum
  - - - Rhynchocorys
      - - Lathraea
        - Rhinanthus
    - Core Rhinantheae
      - Bartsia sensu stricto (Bartsia alpina)
      - - Euphrasia
        - - Hedbergia
            (including Bartsia decurva + B. longiflora)
          - Tozzia
          - Odontites sensu lato
            (including Bartsiella
            and Bornmuellerantha)
          - - Bellardia
            - - Neobartsia
                (New World Bartsia)
              - Parentucellia

The cladogram has been reconstructed from nuclear and plastid DNA molecular characters (ITS, rps16 intron and trnK region).

== Systematics ==
According to Plants of the World Online there are 35 accepted species:

- Rhinanthus alectorolophus
- Rhinanthus antiquus
- Rhinanthus asperulus
- Rhinanthus borbasii
- Rhinanthus burnatii
- Rhinanthus carinthiacus
- Rhinanthus colchicus
- Rhinanthus cretaceus
- Rhinanthus dinaricus
- Rhinanthus freynii
- Rhinanthus glacialis
- Rhinanthus groenlandicus
- Rhinanthus halophilus
- Rhinanthus javorkae
- Rhinanthus major
- Rhinanthus melampyroides
- Rhinanthus minor
- Rhinanthus osiliensis
- Rhinanthus ovifugus
- Rhinanthus pampaninii
- Rhinanthus pindicus
- Rhinanthus ponticus
- Rhinanthus pseudoantiquus
- Rhinanthus pubescens
- Rhinanthus pumilus
- Rhinanthus riphaeus
- Rhinanthus rumelicus
- Rhinanthus schischkinii
- Rhinanthus sintenisii
- Rhinanthus songeonii
- Rhinanthus subulatus
- Rhinanthus transsilvanicus
- Rhinanthus vassilczenkoi
- Rhinanthus wagneri
- Rhinanthus wettsteinii
