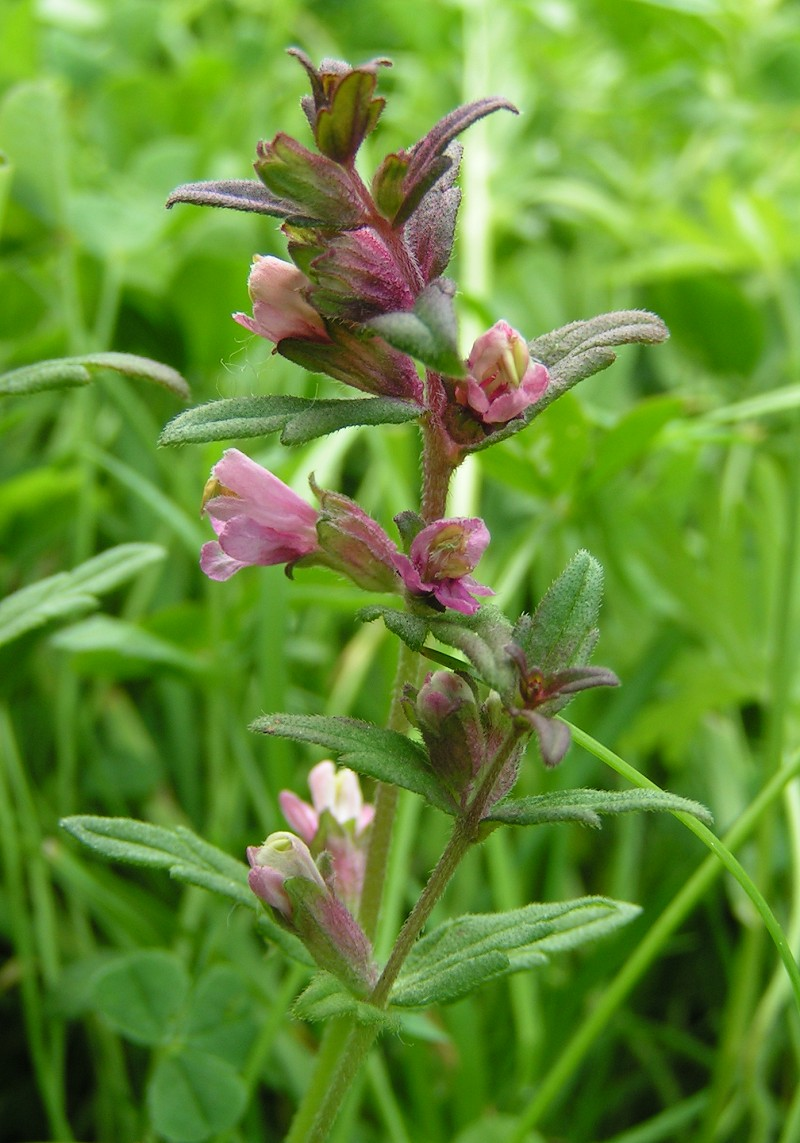
- Red bartsia (Odontites vernus)

Scientific classification
- Kingdom: Plantae
- Clade: Tracheophytes
- Clade: Angiosperms
- Clade: Eudicots
- Clade: Asterids
- Order: Lamiales
- Family: Orobanchaceae
- Tribe: Rhinantheae
- Genus: Odontites; L.

Species
- Odontites luteus; Odontites granatensis; Odontites vernus

= Odontites =

Genus of flowering plants in the broomrape family

Odontites is a genus of flowering plants in the family Orobanchaceae.

== Phylogeny ==
The phylogeny of the genera of Rhinantheae has been explored using molecular characters. Odontites belongs to the core Rhinantheae. It is the sister genus to Bellardia, and then to Tozzia and Hedbergia. These taxa are closely related to the genus Euphrasia. In turn, these five genera share phylogenetic affinities with Bartsia.

Genus-level cladogram of tribe Rhinantheae.

- Rhinantheae
  - Melampyrum
  - - - Rhynchocorys
      - - Lathraea
        - Rhinanthus
    - Core Rhinantheae
      - Bartsia sensu stricto (Bartsia alpina)
      - - Euphrasia
        - - Hedbergia
            (including Bartsia decurva + B. longiflora)
          - Tozzia
          - Odontites sensu lato
            (including Bartsiella
            and Bornmuellerantha)
          - - Bellardia
            - - Neobartsia
                (New World Bartsia)
              - Parentucellia

The cladogram has been reconstructed from nuclear and plastid DNA molecular characters (ITS, rps16 intron and trnK region).

== Conservation ==
One of the Odontites species, O. granatensis, endemic to the Sierra Nevada in Spain, was so threatened that in 1993 only 1,500 plants survived in two locations. Due to conservation efforts the plant has made a comeback, numbering over 100,000 in 2006.
