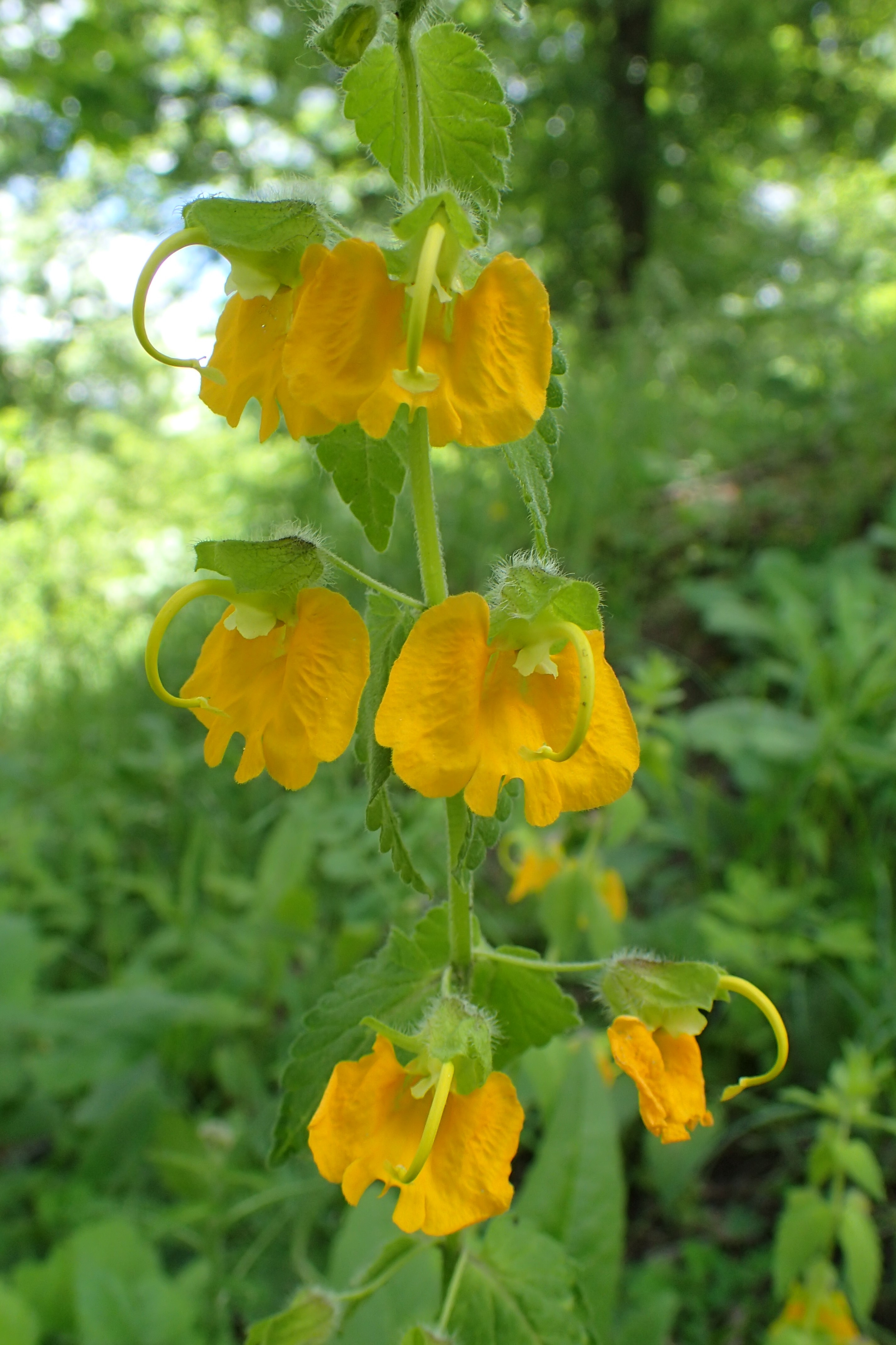
- Rhynchocorys orientalis

Scientific classification
- Kingdom: Plantae
- Clade: Tracheophytes
- Clade: Angiosperms
- Clade: Eudicots
- Clade: Asterids
- Order: Lamiales
- Family: Orobanchaceae
- Tribe: Rhinantheae
- Genus: Rhynchocorys; Griseb.

Species
- Rhynchocorys boissieri Rhynchocorys elephas Rhynchocorys intermedia Rhynchocorys kurdica Rhynchocorys maxima Rhynchocorys odontophylla Rhynchocorys orientalis Rhynchocorys stricta

Synonyms
- Elephantina Bertol.; Probosciphora Neck. ex Caruel; Elephas Mill.

= Rhynchocorys =

Genus of flowering plants in the broomrape family

Rhynchocorys is a small genus of flowering plants belonging to the family Orobanchaceae. It was formerly classified in the family Scrophulariaceae.

It is native to Europe, Morocco and Algeria.

== Etymology ==
The genus name Rhynchocorys derives from the two ancient greek words ῥύγχος (rhúnkhos), meaning "snout, muzzle, nose", and κόρυς (kórus), meaning "helmet, head", which is a reference to the shape of the style.

== Phylogeny ==
The phylogeny of the genera of Rhinantheae has been explored using molecular characters. Rhynchocorys is the sister genus to Lathraea and Rhinanthus. These three genera share phylogenetic affinities with members of the core Rhinantheae: Bartsia, Euphrasia, Tozzia, Hedbergia, Bellardia, and Odontites. Melampyrum appears as a more distant relative.

Genus-level cladogram of tribe Rhinantheae.

- Rhinantheae
  - Melampyrum
  - - - Rhynchocorys
      - - Lathraea
        - Rhinanthus
    - Core Rhinantheae
      - Bartsia sensu stricto (Bartsia alpina)
      - - Euphrasia
        - - Hedbergia
            (including Bartsia decurva + B. longiflora)
          - Tozzia
          - Odontites sensu lato
            (including Bartsiella
            and Bornmuellerantha)
          - - Bellardia
            - - Neobartsia
                (New World Bartsia)
              - Parentucellia

The cladogram has been reconstructed from nuclear and plastid DNA molecular characters (ITS, rps16 intron and trnK region).

== Taxonomy ==
The genus was described in 1844 by August Heinrich Rudolf Grisebach. The type species is Rhynchocorys elephas.

=== Species ===
According to the Plant List, 8 species are recognized in the genus Rhynchocorys:

- Rhynchocorys boissieri Post
- Rhynchocorys elephas (L.) Griseb.
- Rhynchocorys intermedia Albov
- Rhynchocorys kurdica Nábělek
- Rhynchocorys maxima Richt. ex Stapf, possibly to be reduced under synonymy of R. elephas
- Rhynchocorys odontophylla R.B.Burb. & I.Richardson
- Rhynchocorys orientalis Benth.
- Rhynchocorys stricta Albov
