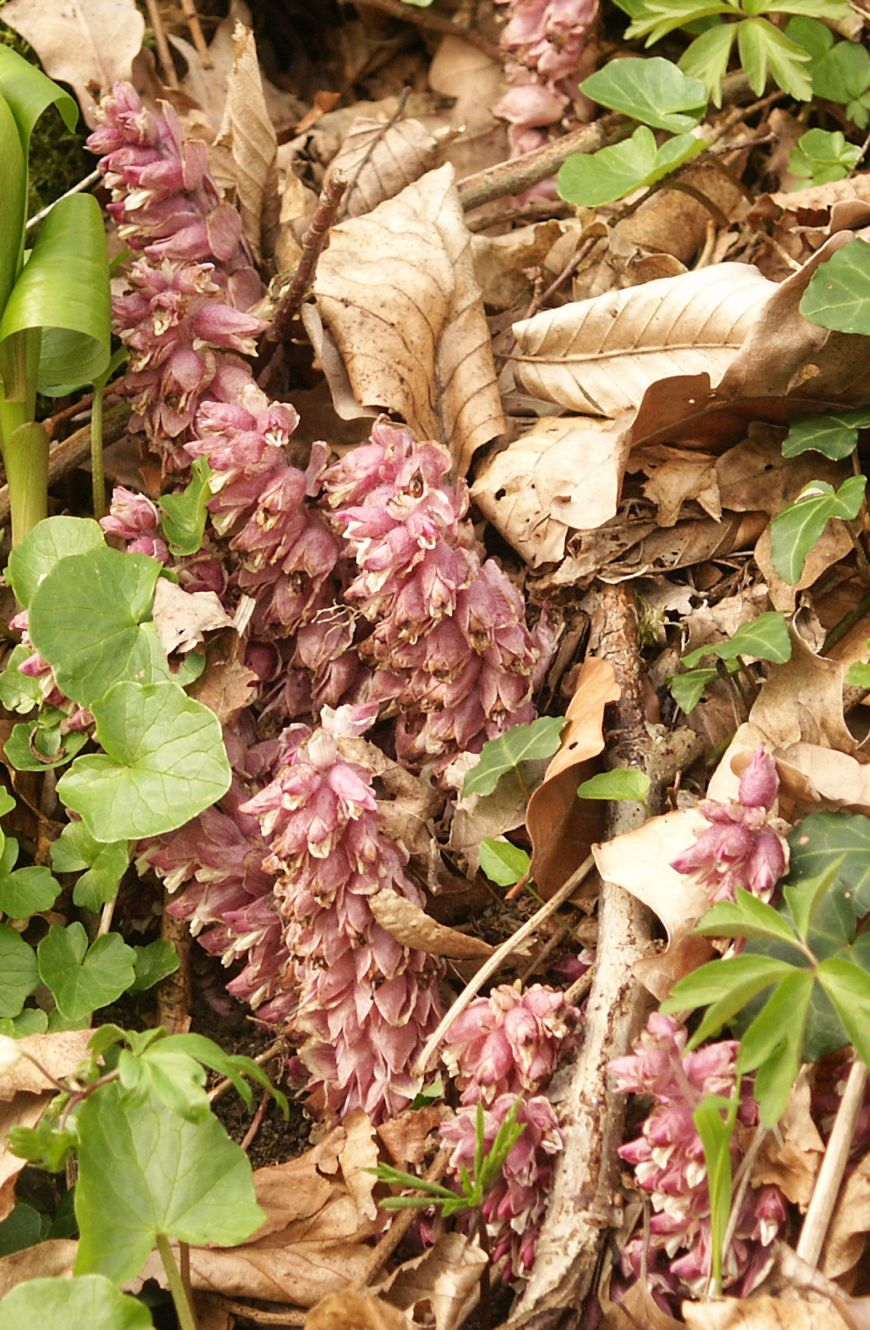
- Common toothwort (Lathraea squamaria)

Scientific classification
- Kingdom: Plantae
- Clade: Tracheophytes
- Clade: Angiosperms
- Clade: Eudicots
- Clade: Asterids
- Order: Lamiales
- Family: Orobanchaceae
- Tribe: Rhinantheae
- Genus: Lathraea; L.

Species
- Lathraea clandestina Lathraea japonica Lathraea purpurea Lathraea rhodopea Lathraea squamaria

= Lathraea =

Genus of flowering plants in the broomrape family

Lathraea (toothwort) is a small genus of five to seven species of flowering plants, native to temperate Europe and Asia. They are parasitic plants on the roots of other plants, and are completely lacking chlorophyll. They are classified in the family Orobanchaceae.

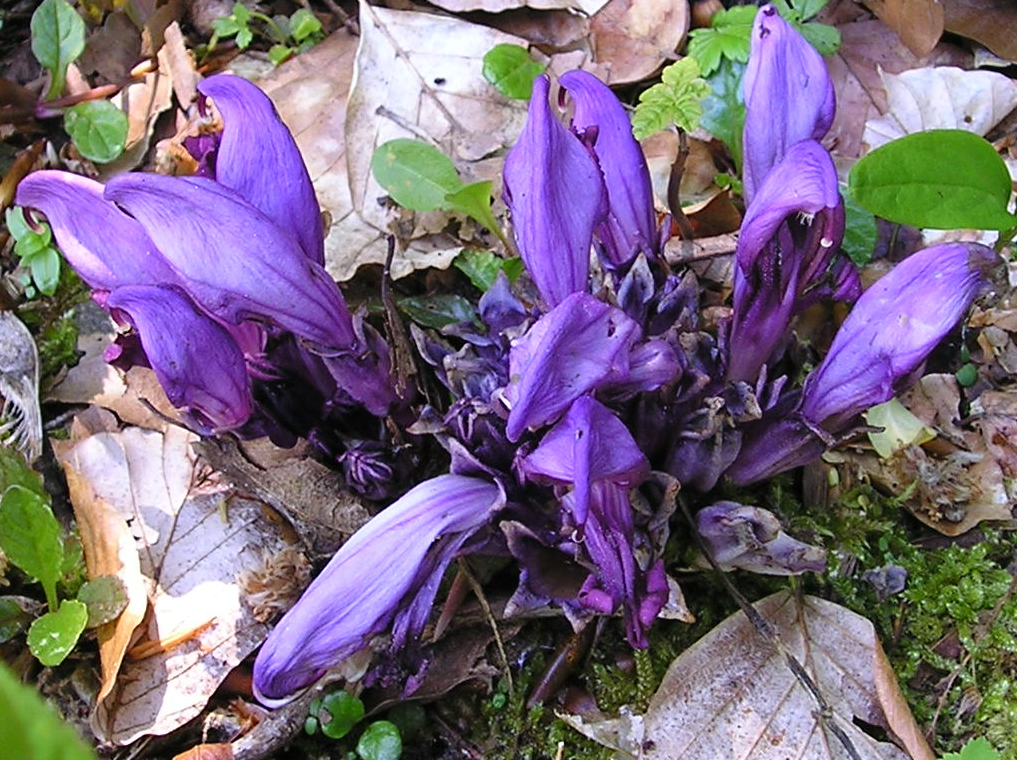
Purple toothwort (Lathraea clandestina)

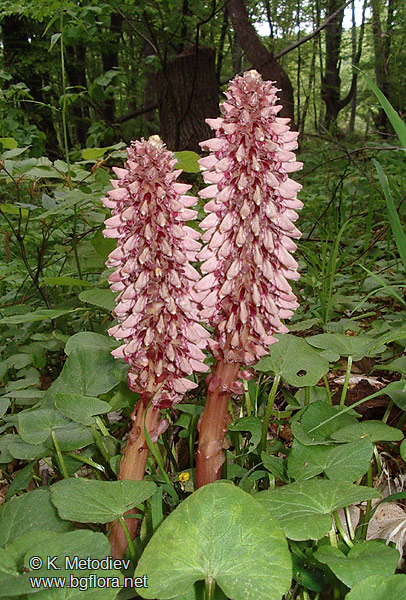
Lathraea rhodopea

== Etymology ==
The genus name Lathraea derives from the ancient greek λαθραῖος (lathraîos), meaning "clandestine", which is a reference to the fact that it is inconspicuous until it flowers.

== Phylogeny ==
The phylogeny of the genera of Rhinantheae has been explored using molecular characters. Lathraea is the sister genus to Rhinanthus, and then to Rhynchocorys. These three genera share phylogenetic affinities with members of the core Rhinantheae: Bartsia, Euphrasia, Tozzia, Hedbergia, Bellardia, and Odontites. Melampyrum appears as a more distant relative.

Genus-level cladogram of tribe Rhinantheae.

- Rhinantheae
  - Melampyrum
  - - - Rhynchocorys
      - - Lathraea
        - Rhinanthus
    - Core Rhinantheae
      - Bartsia sensu stricto (Bartsia alpina)
      - - Euphrasia
        - - Hedbergia
            (including Bartsia decurva + B. longiflora)
          - Tozzia
          - Odontites sensu lato
            (including Bartsiella
            and Bornmuellerantha)
          - - Bellardia
            - - Neobartsia
                (New World Bartsia)
              - Parentucellia

The cladogram has been reconstructed from nuclear and plastid DNA molecular characters (ITS, rps16 intron and trnK region).

== Species ==
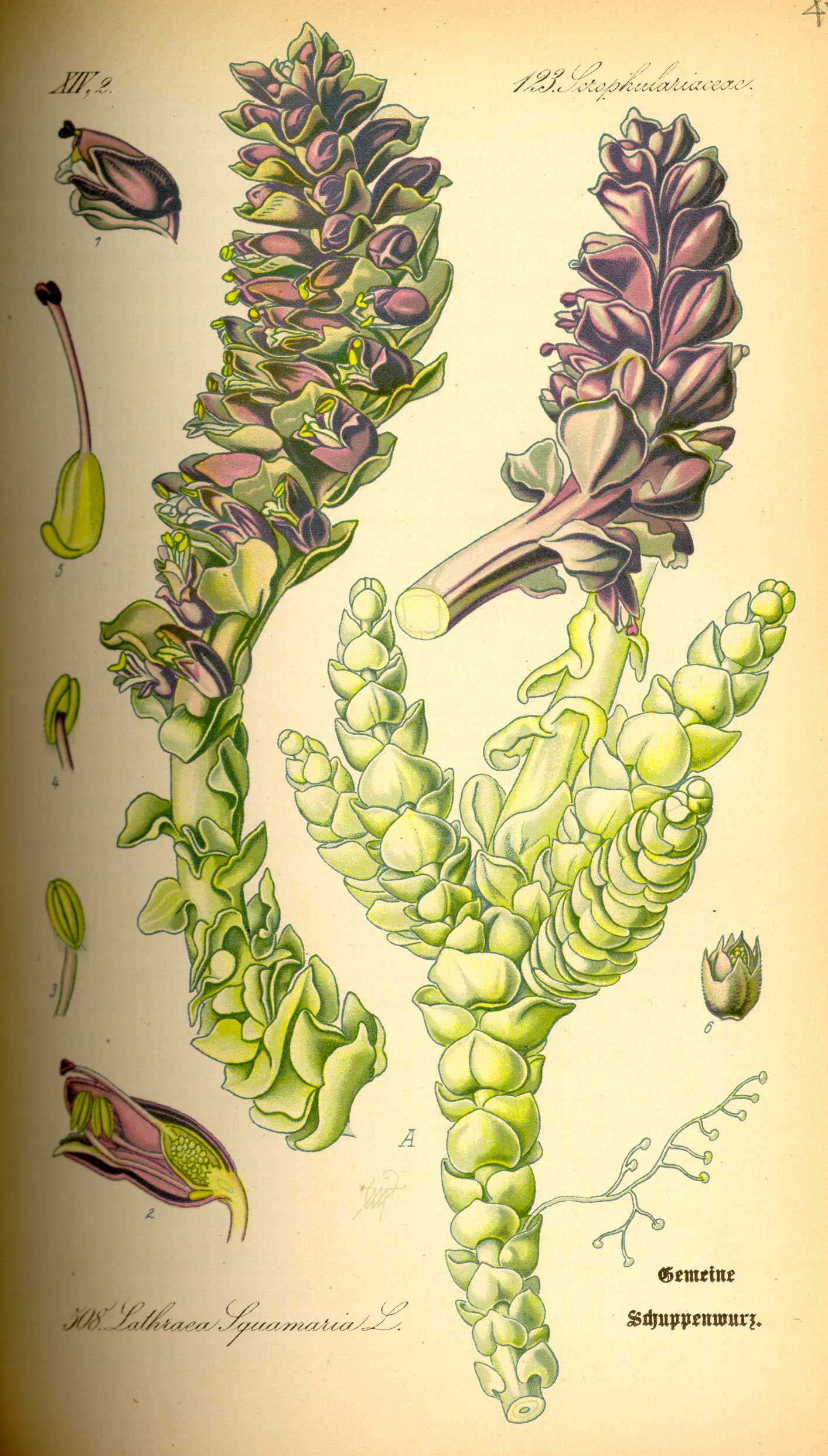
Common toothwort. Illustration from Thomé, Flora von Deutschland, Österreich und der Schweiz, 1885

- Common toothwort (Lathraea squamaria) is parasitic on the roots of hazel and alder, occasionally on beech, in shady places such as hedge sides. Lathraea squamaria is widespread in Europe. The common toothwort is a protocarnivorous plant. Most of the plant consists of a branched whitish underground stem closely covered with thick fleshy colourless leaves, which are bent over so as to hide the under surface; irregular cavities communicating with the exterior are formed in the thickness of the leaf. On the inner walls of these chambers are stalked hairs, which when stimulated by the touch of an insect send out delicate filaments by means of which the insect is killed and digested.
- Purple toothwort (Lathraea clandestina) grows on the roots mainly of alder, poplar and willow. At Arduaine Garden in Argyll in the absence of the three well-known hosts it grows on the roots of a variety of ornamental trees and shrubs; in the same garden cats are frequently seen to roll in the flowers and to eat them. It differs from common toothwort in the dark purple flowers being produced one on each stem. Purple toothwort grows in Middle and South Europe: Western Belgium, Western and Central France and Northern Spain, and locally in Central Italy. Elsewhere, especially in the British Isles, the plant is locally naturalized in parks and old gardens and along river banks.
- Rhodope toothwort (Lathraea rhodopaea) is common in the Rhodope Mountains and Rila mountain range in southeastern Europe.

== Cultural references ==
In Pavel Ivanovich Melnikov's "In the Forests" a Russian wise woman (znakharka) calls this plant Peter's Cross and says it protects against devils but only if collected with a prayer to God.
