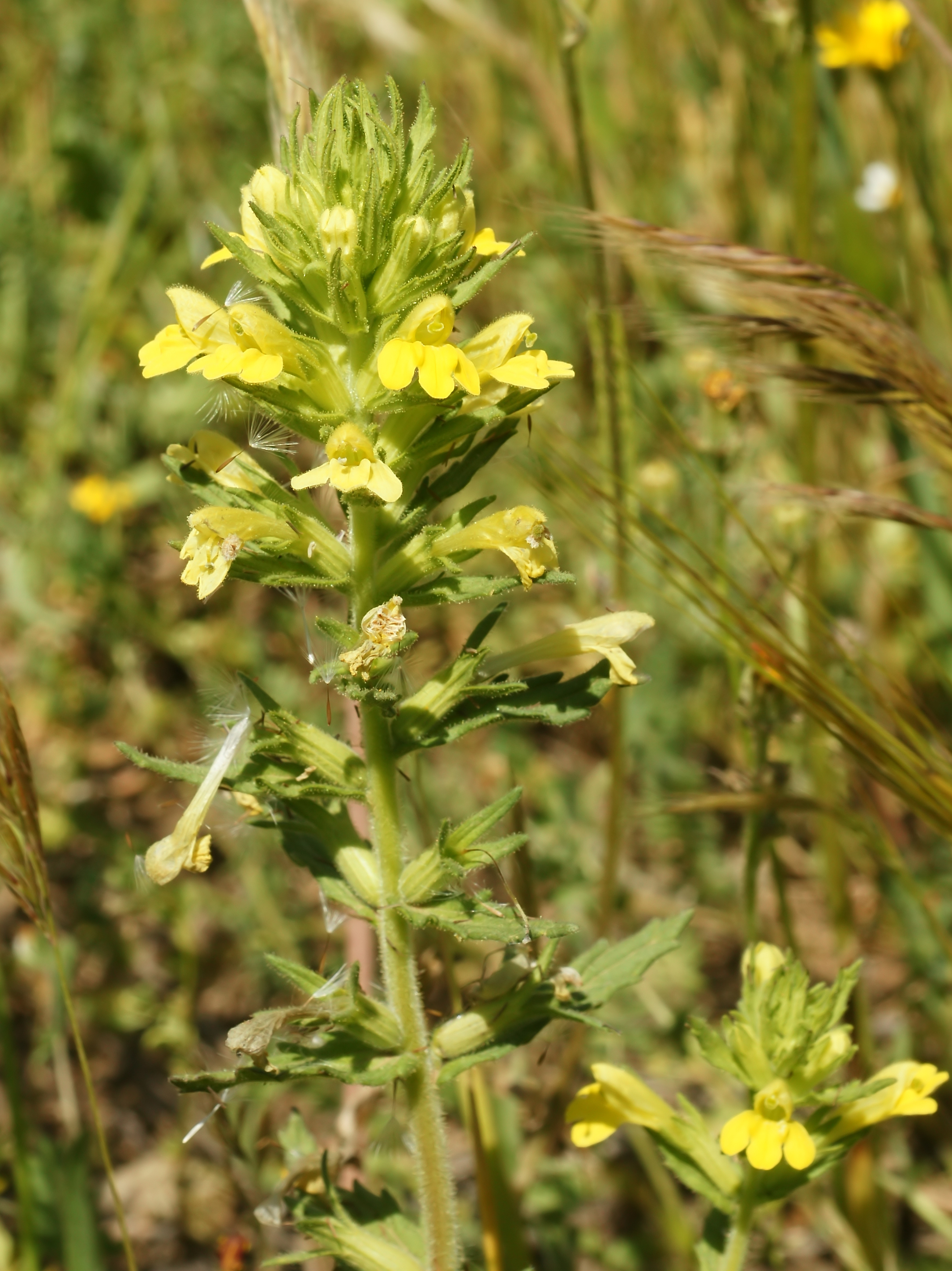
- Parentucellia viscosa

Scientific classification
- Kingdom: Plantae
- Clade: Tracheophytes
- Clade: Angiosperms
- Clade: Eudicots
- Clade: Asterids
- Order: Lamiales
- Family: Orobanchaceae
- Tribe: Rhinantheae
- Genus: Parentucellia; Viv.

Type species
- Parentucellia floribunda Viv.

Species
- About 4, see text

= Parentucellia =

Genus of flowering plants in the broomrape family

Parentucellia is a small genus of flowering plants in the family Orobanchaceae containing about four species. They are known generally as glandweeds. The genus was named for Pope Nicholas V, whose surname was Parentucelli.

== Phylogeny ==
The phylogeny of the genera of Rhinantheae has been explored using molecular characters. Parentucellia belongs to the core Rhinantheae. It is closely related to the genus Bellardia, and then to Odontites, Tozzia and Hedbergia. In turn, these genera share phylogenetic affinities with Euphrasia and Bartsia.

Genus-level cladogram of the Rhinantheae.

- Rhinantheae
  - Melampyrum
  - - - Rhynchocorys
      - - Lathraea
        - Rhinanthus
    - Core Rhinantheae
      - Bartsia sensu stricto (Bartsia alpina)
      - - Euphrasia
        - - Hedbergia
            (including Bartsia decurva + B. longiflora)
          - Tozzia
          - Odontites sensu lato
            (including Bartsiella
            and Bornmuellerantha)
          - - Bellardia
            - - Neobartsia
                (New World Bartsia)
              - Parentucellia

The cladogram has been reconstructed from nuclear and plastid DNA molecular characters (ITS, rps16 intron and trnK region).

== Systematics ==
Species include:

- Parentucellia floribunda
- Parentucellia latifolia
- Parentucellia viscosa
