= Bartsia pumila =

Conservation status
- Vulnerable (IUCN 3.1)

Scientific classification
- Kingdom: Plantae
- Clade: Tracheophytes
- Clade: Angiosperms
- Clade: Eudicots
- Clade: Asterids
- Order: Lamiales
- Family: Orobanchaceae
- Tribe: Rhinantheae
- Genus: Neobartsia
- Species: N. pumila

Binomial name
- Neobartsia pumila Uribe-Convers & Tank, comb. nov.

Synonyms
- Bartsia pumila Benth.

Species of flowering plant in the broomrape family

Neobartsia pumila, formerly Bartsia pumila, is a species of flowering plant in the family Orobanchaceae. It is endemic to Ecuador.
