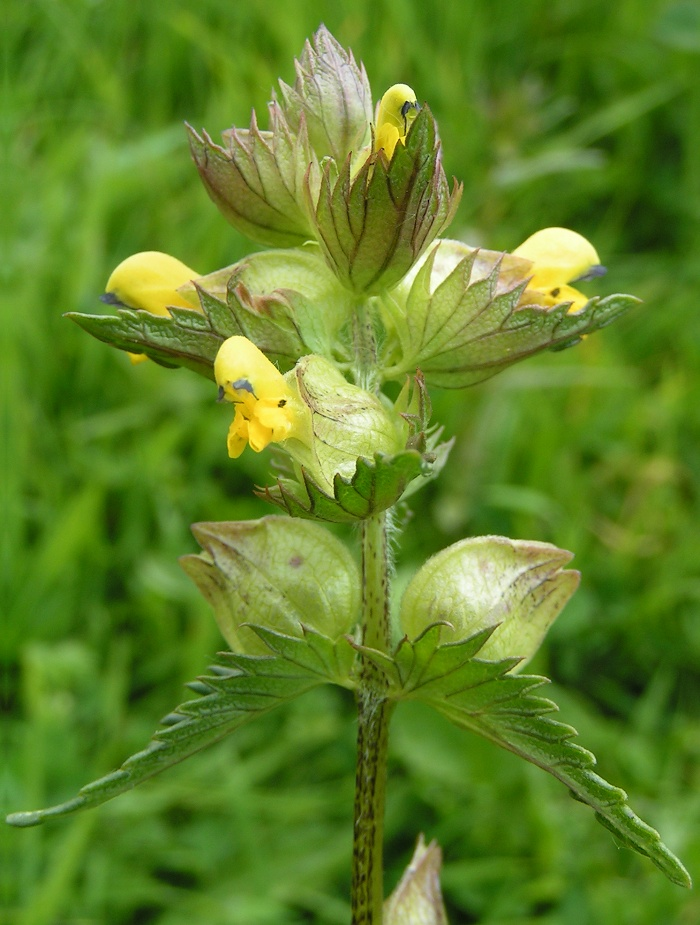
- Rhinanthus minor

Scientific classification
- Kingdom: Plantae
- Clade: Tracheophytes
- Clade: Angiosperms
- Clade: Eudicots
- Clade: Asterids
- Order: Lamiales
- Family: Orobanchaceae
- Tribe: Rhinantheae

Genera
- See text.

Synonyms
- Pedicularidae Duby 1828; Euphrasieae Benth. 1846; Euphrasiaceae Martynov 1820; Melampyraceae Rich. ex Hook. & Lindl. 1821

= Rhinantheae =

Tribe of flowering plants in the broomrape family

Rhinantheae is a tribe with fewer than 20 genera of herbaceous plants in the family Orobanchaceae.

== Phylogeny ==
The phylogeny of the genera of Rhinantheae has been explored using DNA markers. Three assemblages can be distinguished in this tribe:

- Rhinanthus is the sister genus to Lathraea, and then to Rhynchocorys. These taxa are closely related to the core Rhinanteae.
- In the core Rhinantheae, Odontites sensu lato, including Bornmuellerantha and Bartsiella, is the sister genus to Bellardia, including Parentucellia and Bartsia canescens + B. mutica. These taxa are closely related to Hedbergia (including Bartsia decurva + B. longiflora) and Tozzia. In turn, these genera share phylogenetic affinities with Euphrasia, and then with Bartsia sensu stricto (Bartsia alpina).
- Melampyrum occupies an isolated, deep-branching position.

Genus-level cladogram of the Rhinantheae.

- Rhinantheae
  - Melampyrum
  - - - Rhynchocorys
      - - Lathraea
        - Rhinanthus
    - Core Rhinantheae
      - Bartsia sensu stricto (Bartsia alpina)
      - - Euphrasia
        - - Hedbergia
            (including Bartsia decurva + B. longiflora)
          - Tozzia
          - Odontites sensu lato
            (including Bartsiella
            and Bornmuellerantha)
          - - Bellardia
            - - Neobartsia
                (New World Bartsia)
              - Parentucellia

The cladogram has been reconstructed from nuclear and plastid DNA molecular characters (ITS, rps16 intron and trnK region).

The median crown age of Rhinantheae was estimated to be ca. 30 Myr.

== Systematics ==
Rhinantheae is defined as the least inclusive crown clade that includes Pterygiella nigrescens, Rhinanthus cristagalli, Melampyrum pratense, and Tozzia alpina. It comprises 19 genera.

- Bartsia
- Bartsiella
- Bellardia
- Bornmuellerantha
- Euphrasia
- Hedbergia
- Lathraea
- Macrosyringion
- Melampyrum
- Nothobartsia
- Odontitella
- Odontites
- Parentucellia
- Pseuodbartsia
- Pterygiella
- Rhinanthus
- Rhynchocorys
- Tozzia
- Xizangia
