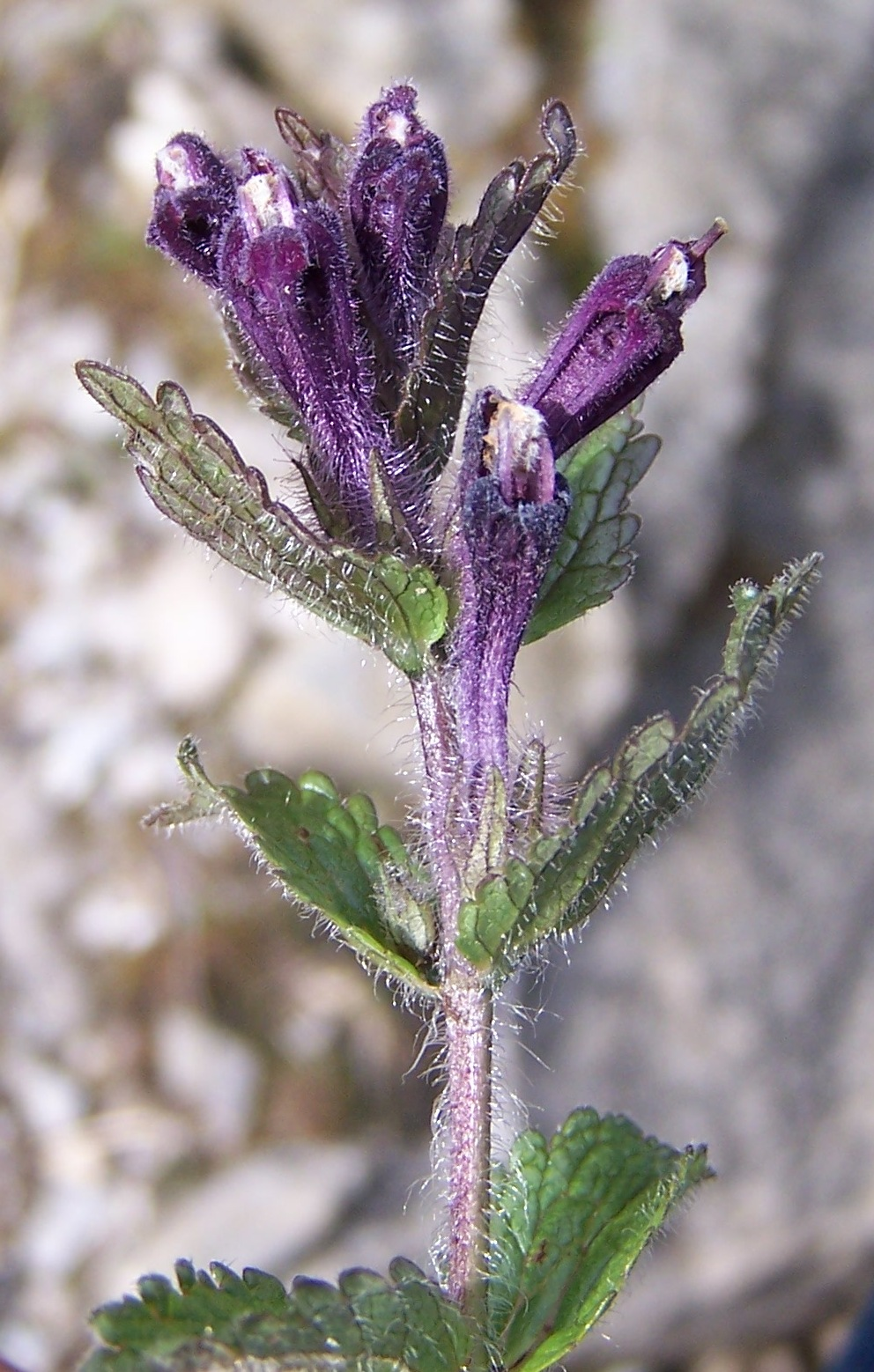
- Bartsia alpina

Scientific classification
- Kingdom: Plantae
- Clade: Embryophytes
- Clade: Tracheophytes
- Clade: Angiosperms
- Clade: Eudicots
- Clade: Asterids
- Order: Lamiales
- Family: Orobanchaceae
- Tribe: Rhinantheae
- Genus: Bartsia; L.

= Bartsia =

Genus of flowering plants in the broomrape family

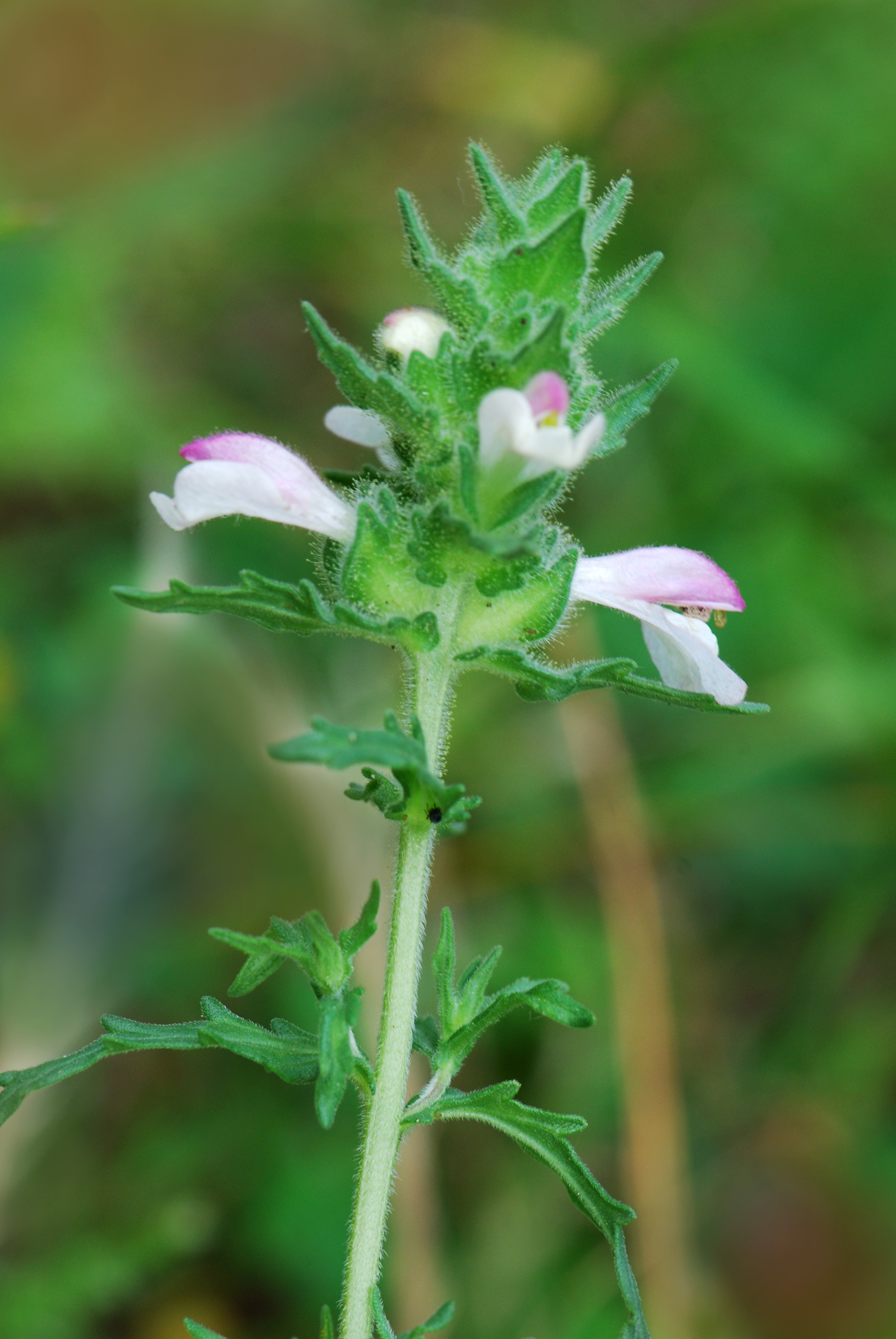
Bartsia trixago (synonym of Bellardia trixago)

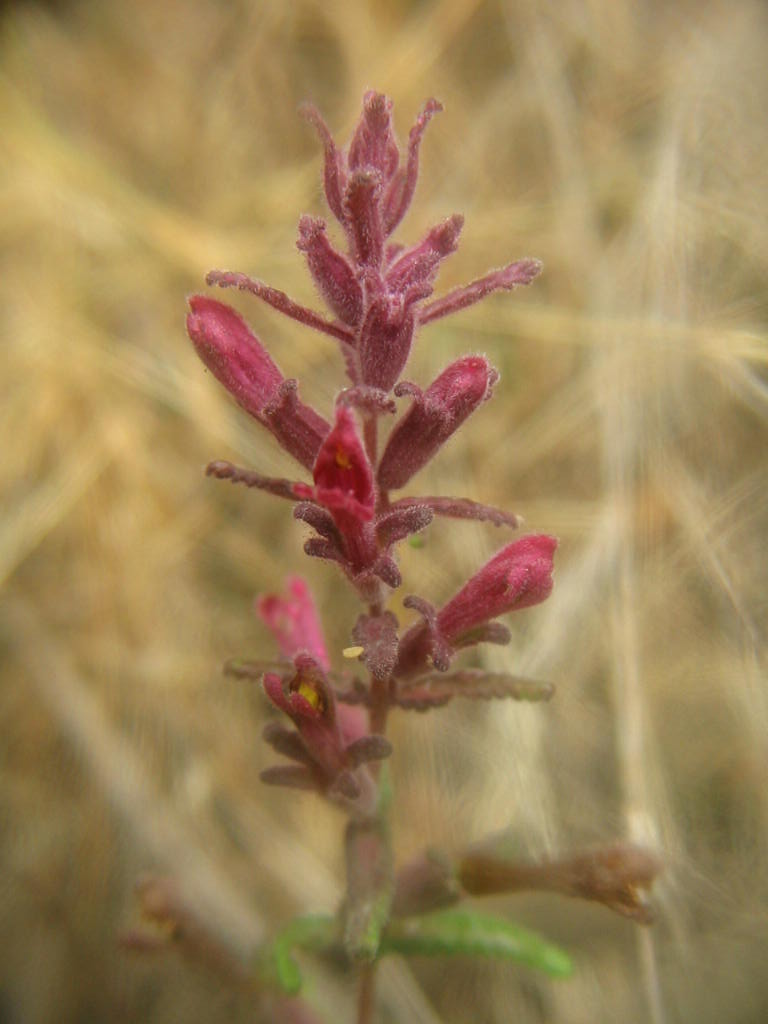
Bartsia chilensis (basionym of Neobartsia chilensis)

Bartsia is a genus of flowering plants in the family Orobanchaceae.

== Etymology ==
Bartsia was named after Johann Bartsch (Latinized as Johannes Bartsius, 1709-1738), a botanist of Königsberg. The plant was named for him by his associate Carl Linnaeus, and the genus has been sometimes spelt as Bartschia.

Starbia, an anagram of Bartsia, is another genus of Orobanchaceae, synonym of Alectra.

== Phylogeny ==
The phylogeny of the genera of Rhinantheae has been explored using molecular characters. Bartsia belongs to the core Rhinantheae. Bartsia sensu stricto (e.g. B. alpina) is the sister genus to Odontites, Bellardia, Tozzia, Hedbergia, and Euphrasia.

Genus-level cladogram of tribe Rhinantheae.

- Rhinantheae
  - Melampyrum
  - - - Rhynchocorys
      - - Lathraea
        - Rhinanthus
    - Core Rhinantheae
      - Bartsia sensu stricto (Bartsia alpina)
      - - Euphrasia
        - - Hedbergia
            (including Bartsia decurva + B. longiflora)
          - Tozzia
          - Odontites sensu lato
            (including Bartsiella
            and Bornmuellerantha)
          - - Bellardia
            - - Neobartsia
                (New World Bartsia)
              - Parentucellia

The cladogram has been reconstructed from nuclear and plastid DNA molecular characters (ITS, rps16 intron and trnK region).

== Classification ==
In 1990, the genus was revised to contain 49 species; 45 of them are endemic to the Andes. The most familiar species might be the well-studied Bartsia alpina, which has a circumboreal distribution, occurring throughout northern regions of the Northern Hemisphere. There are also two afromontane species, restricted to the mountains of northeastern Africa: Bartsia decurva and Bartsia longiflora. These two plants, B. alpina, and the many Andean species are three distinct lineages, making the genus polyphyletic.

As a solution to the problem of Bartsia polyphyly, two taxonomic adjustments have been proposed.

1. All South American species are reclassified into the new genus Neobartsia. This new name keeps traceability with Bartsia while incorporating information about its New World distribution (in ancient Greek, νέος, i.e. néos, means 'new').
2. The two African species Bartsia decurva and Bartsia longiflora are reclassified into the existing genus Hedbergia.

Accepted species names include the following taxa classified according to geographic distribution groups.

=== Europe ===
- Bartsia alpina L. – velvetbells

=== Mediterranean Basin ===
- Bartsia trixago L. (=Bellardia trixago (L.) All.)

=== Northeastern Africa ===
- Hedbergia decurva, synonym of Bartsia decurva Hochst. ex Benth.
- Hedbergia longiflora, synonym of Bartsia longiflora Hochst. ex Benth.

=== Andean South America ===
- Bartsia acuminata Pursh
- Bartsia altissima Rusby
- Bartsia anomala Edwin
- Bartsia asperrima (Link) Samp.
- Bartsia aurea Edwin
- Neobartsia adenophylla (Molau) Uribe-Convers & Tank, comb. nov.
- Neobartsia alba (Molau) Uribe-Convers & Tank, comb. nov.
- Neobartsia aprica (Diels) Uribe-Convers & Tank, comb. nov.
- Neobartsia australis (Molau) Uribe-Convers & Tank, comb. nov.
- Neobartsia bartsioides (Hook.) Uribe-Convers & Tank, comb. nov.
- Neobartsia camporum (Diels) Uribe-Convers & Tank, comb. nov.
- Neobartsia canescens (Wedd.) Uribe-Convers & Tank, comb. nov.
- Neobartsia chilensis (Benth.) Uribe-Convers & Tank, comb. nov.
- Neobartsia crenata (Molau) Uribe-Convers & Tank, comb. nov.
- Neobartsia crenoloba (Wedd.) Uribe-Convers & Tank, comb. nov.
- Neobartsia crisafullii (N.H.Holmgren) Uribe-Convers & Tank, comb. nov.
- Neobartsia diffusa (Benth.) Uribe-Convers & Tank, comb. nov.
- Neobartsia elachophylla (Diels) Uribe-Convers & Tank, comb. nov.
- Neobartsia elongata (Wedd.) Uribe-Convers & Tank, comb. nov.
- Neobartsia fiebrigii (Diels) Uribe-Convers & Tank, comb. nov.
- Neobartsia filiformis (Wedd.) Uribe-Convers & Tank, comb. nov.
- Neobartsia flava (Molau) Uribe-Convers & Tank, comb. nov.
- Neobartsia glandulifera (Molau) Uribe-Convers & Tank, comb. nov.
- Neobartsia inaequalis (Benth.) Uribe-Convers & Tank, comb. nov.
- Neobartsia integrifolia (Wedd.) Uribe-Convers & Tank, comb. nov.
- Neobartsia jujuyensis (Cabrera & Botta) Uribe-Convers & Tank, comb. nov.
- Neobartsia laniflora (Benth.) Uribe-Convers & Tank, comb. nov.
- Neobartsia laticrenata (Benth.) Uribe-Convers & Tank, comb. nov.
- Neobartsia lydiae (Sylvester) Uribe-Convers & Tank, comb. nov.
- Neobartsia melampyroides (Kunth) Uribe-Convers & Tank, comb. nov.
- Neobartsia mutica (Kunth) Uribe-Convers & Tank, comb. nov.
- Neobartsia orthocarpiflora (Benth.) Uribe-Convers & Tank, comb. nov.
- Neobartsia patens (Benth.) Uribe-Convers & Tank, comb. nov.
- Neobartsia pauciflora (Molau) Uribe-Convers & Tank, comb. nov.
- Neobartsia pedicularoides (Benth.) Uribe-Convers & Tank, comb. nov.
- Neobartsia peruviana (Walp.) Uribe-Convers & Tank, comb. nov.
- Neobartsia pumila (Benth.) Uribe-Convers & Tank, comb. nov.
- Neobartsia pyricarpa (Molau) Uribe-Convers & Tank, comb. nov.
- Neobartsia ramosa (Molau) Uribe-Convers & Tank, comb. nov.
- Neobartsia remota (Molau) Uribe-Convers & Tank, comb. nov.
- Neobartsia rigida (Molau) Uribe-Convers & Tank, comb. nov.
- Neobartsia santolinifolia (Kunth) Uribe-Convers & Tank, comb. nov.
- Neobartsia sericea (Molau) Uribe-Convers & Tank, comb. nov.
- Neobartsia serrata (Molau) Uribe-Convers & Tank, comb. nov.
- Neobartsia stricta (Kunth) Uribe-Convers & Tank, comb. nov.
- Neobartsia strigosa (Molau) Uribe-Convers & Tank, comb. nov.
- Neobartsia tenuis (Molau) Uribe-Convers & Tank, comb. nov.
- Neobartsia thiantha (Diels) Uribe-Convers & Tank, comb. nov.
- Neobartsia tomentosa (Molau) Uribe-Convers & Tank, comb. nov.
- Neobartsia trichophylla (Wedd.) Uribe-Convers & Tank, comb. nov.
- Neobartsia tricolor (Molau) Uribe-Convers & Tank, comb. nov.
- Neobartsia weberbaueri (Diels) Uribe-Convers & Tank, comb. nov.
