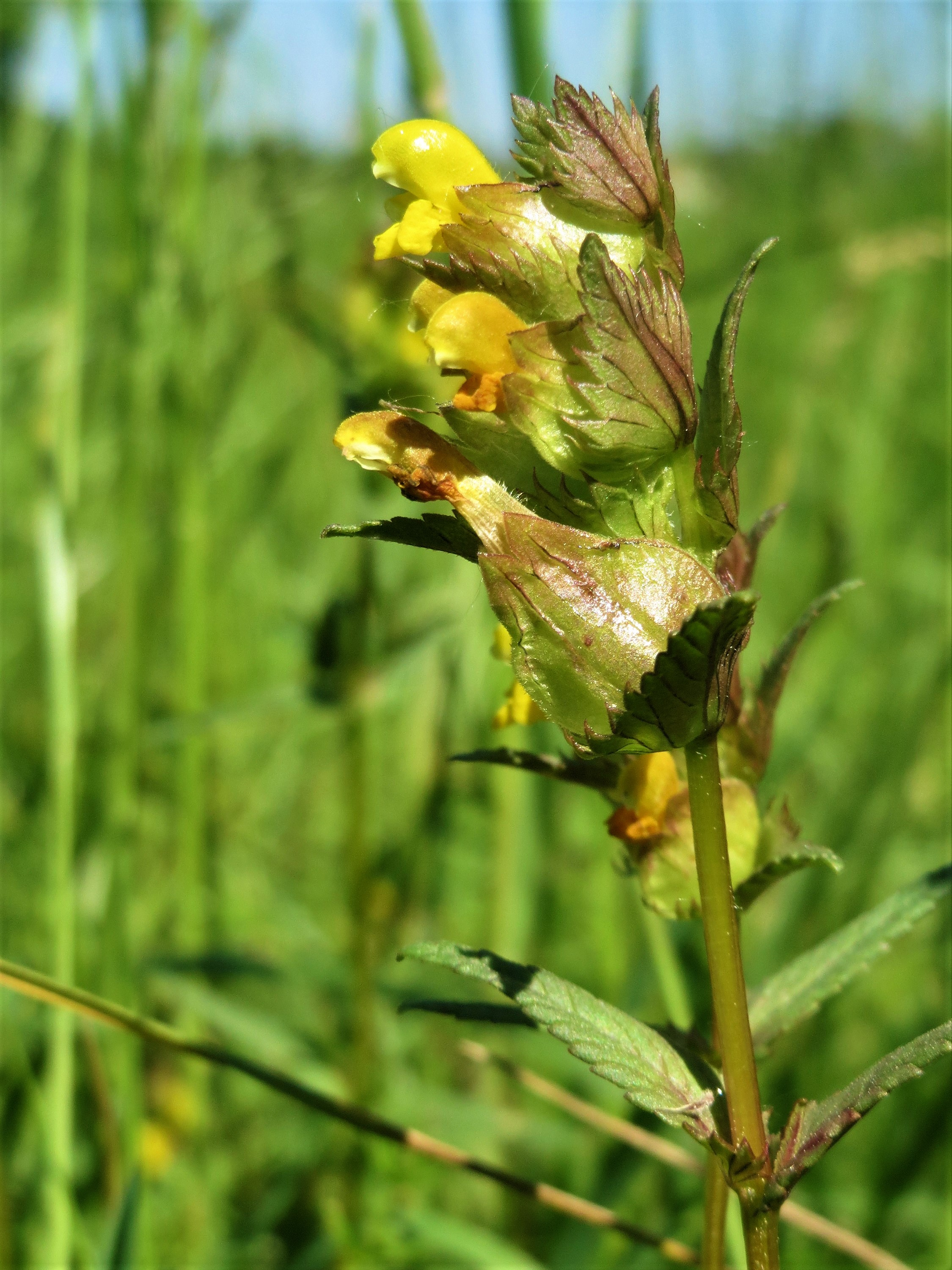

Scientific classification
- Kingdom: Plantae
- Clade: Tracheophytes
- Clade: Angiosperms
- Clade: Eudicots
- Clade: Asterids
- Order: Lamiales
- Family: Orobanchaceae
- Genus: Rhinanthus
- Species: R. minor

Binomial name
- Rhinanthus minor L.

Synonyms
- List: Alectorolophus × fallax var. hispanicus Sennen & Elías; Alectorolophus alpinus Rchb.; Alectorolophus buccalis Heynh.; Alectorolophus crista-galli (L.) M.Bieb.; Alectorolophus crista-galli var. monticola (Lamotte) K.Malý; Alectorolophus crista-galli var. rusticulus (Chabert) Sterneck; Alectorolophus crista-galli subsp. stenophyllus (Schur) K.Malý; Alectorolophus glaber All.; Alectorolophus grandiflorus var. glabratus Wallr.; Alectorolophus kyrollae (Chabert) Sterneck; Alectorolophus longibracteatus Kociejotoski; Alectorolophus major var. glaber Rchb.; Alectorolophus minor (L.) Dumort.; Alectorolophus minor Rchb.; Alectorolophus minor var. monticola (Lamotte) Sterneck; Alectorolophus minor var. rusticulus (Chabert) Hayek; Alectorolophus minor var. stenophyllus (Schur) Wettst.; Alectorolophus minor f. vittulatus (Gremli) Sterneck; Alectorolophus monticola (Lamotte) Sterneck; Alectorolophus parviflorus Wallr.; Alectorolophus parviflorus var. longidens (Chabert) Rouy; Alectorolophus parviflorus var. perrieri (Chabert) Rouy; Alectorolophus parviflorus var. rusticulus (Chabert) Rouy; Alectorolophus parviflorus var. stenophyllus (Schur) Rouy; Alectorolophus parviflorus f. stenophyllus (Schur) Beck; Alectorolophus parviflorus var. vittulatus (Gremli) Rouy; Alectorolophus personatus Behrendsen & Sterneck; Alectorolophus pulchella Schumach. ex Wimm.; Alectorolophus ramosus Schur; Alectorolophus rigidus (Chabert) Sterneck; Alectorolophus rusticulus (Chabert) Sterneck; Alectorolophus stenophyllus Sterneck; Alectorolophus stenophyllus Schur; Alectorolophus villosus Dumort.; Fistularia alpina Wettst.; Fistularia crista-galli (L.) Kuntze; Fistularia crista-galli var. vittulatus (Gremli) Borbás; Fistularia minor (L.) Kuntze; Mimulus crista-galli (L.) Scop.; Rhinanthus borealis subsp. kyrollae (Chabert) Pennell; Rhinanthus calcareus Wilmott; Rhinanthus crista-galli L.; Rhinanthus crista-galli subsp. crista-galli Ehrh.; Rhinanthus crista-galli f. genevensis (Chabert) Soó; Rhinanthus crista-galli f. longidens (Chabert) Soó; Rhinanthus crista-galli f. maculiferus Lindb. ex Soó; Rhinanthus crista-galli f. maritimus Sennen & Leroy; Rhinanthus crista-galli f. minimus Schur; Rhinanthus crista-galli subsp. minor (L.) Bonnier & Layens; Rhinanthus crista-galli var. minor (L.) Hartm.; Rhinanthus crista-galli subsp. monticola (Lamotte) Soó; Rhinanthus crista-galli var. ramosissimus (Schur) Soó; Rhinanthus crista-galli subsp. rusticulus (Chabert) Soó; Rhinanthus crista-galli var. rusticulus (Chabert) Schinz & Thell.; Rhinanthus crista-galli subsp. stenophyllus (Schur) Soó; Rhinanthus crista-galli var. stenophyllus (Schur) Fiori; Rhinanthus crus-galli Clem. & E.G.Clem.; Rhinanthus elatior (Soó) Tzvelev; Rhinanthus gardineri Druce; Rhinanthus glaber Lam.; Rhinanthus glaber subsp. minor (L.) Schübl. & G.Martens; Rhinanthus glaber var. minor (L.) Corb.; Rhinanthus hercynicus O.Schwarz; Rhinanthus kyrollae Chabert; Rhinanthus lintonii Wilmott; Rhinanthus lochabrensis Wilmott; Rhinanthus longibracteatus (Kociejotoski) Domin; Rhinanthus major subsp. glaber F.W.Schultz; Rhinanthus minor var. angustifolius W.D.J.Koch; Rhinanthus minor var. angustifolius Gren.; Rhinanthus minor subsp. balticus U.Schneid.; Rhinanthus minor var. balticus (U.Schneid.) Hartl; Rhinanthus minor subsp. elatior (Soó) P.Fourn.; Rhinanthus minor f. genevensis Chabert; Rhinanthus minor f. gracilis Poeverl.; Rhinanthus minor var. hercynicus (O.Schwarz) Hartl; Rhinanthus minor var. longidens Chabert; Rhinanthus minor f. longiramosus Poeverl.; Rhinanthus minor f. maculifer H.Lindb. ex Hiitonen; Rhinanthus minor var. monticola Lamotte; Rhinanthus minor subsp. perrieri (Chabert) P.Fourn.; Rhinanthus minor subvar. pubescens Merino; Rhinanthus minor var. ramosissimus Schur; Rhinanthus minor f. ramosus Poeverl.; Rhinanthus minor subsp. resimus Neuman; Rhinanthus minor var. rusticulus Chabert; Rhinanthus minor subsp. stenophyllus (Schur) P.Fourn.; Rhinanthus minor var. stenophyllus Schur; Rhinanthus minor var. vittulatus Gremli; Rhinanthus monticola (Lamotte) Druce; Rhinanthus nigricans Meinsh.; Rhinanthus obscurus Stephan; Rhinanthus pallens Wibel; Rhinanthus parviflorus Bluff & Fingerh.; Rhinanthus perrieri Chabert; Rhinanthus personatus Bég.; Rhinanthus pratensis Vill.; Rhinanthus ramosus Schur; Rhinanthus rigidus Chabert; Rhinanthus rumelicus subsp. hercynicus (O.Schwarz) Soó; Rhinanthus rusticulus (Chabert) Druce; Rhinanthus secundus Bréb.; Rhinanthus spadiceus Wilmott; Rhinanthus spadiceus subsp. orcadensis Wilmott; Rhinanthus stenophyllus (Schur) Schinz & Thell.; Rhinanthus stenophyllus (Schur) Druce; Rhinanthus stenophyllus var. monticola (Lamotte) Schinz & Thell.; Rhinanthus vachelliae Wilmott; Rhinanthus vulgaris Hill

= Rhinanthus minor =

Yellow rattle

Species of flowering plant in the broomrape family

Rhinanthus minor, known as yellow rattle, (Note: Other common names for Rhinanthus minor include yellow-rattle, little yellow rattle, cockscomb rhinanthus, hay rattle, rattle basket and cockscomb.) is a herbaceous wildflower in the genus Rhinanthus in the broomrape family. It has circumpolar distribution in Europe, Russia, western Asia, and northern North America. An annual plant, yellow rattle grows up to 10–50 centimetres (3.9–19.7 in) tall, with upright stems and opposite, simple leaves. The fruit is a dry capsule, with loose, rattling seeds.

The preferred habitat of Rhinanthus minor is dry fields or meadows; it tolerates a wide range of soil types. It flowers in the summer between May and September. It is hemiparasitic, notably on Poaceae (grasses) and Fabaceae (legumes), and farmers consider it to be a pest, as it reduces grass growth.

Yellow rattle is used to create or restore wildflower meadows, where it maintains species diversity by suppressing dominant grasses and the recycling of soil nutrients. The seed is sown thinly onto grassland from August to November—to germinate the following spring, the seeds need to remain in the soil throughout the winter months.

== Description ==
Yellow rattle is a herbaceous annual plant that resembles the larger greater yellow rattle (Rhinanthus angustifolius). The plant grows to up to 10–50 centimetres (4–20 in) tall, with opposite, simple leaves measuring 20–30 millimetres (0.8–1.2 in) × 5–8 millimetres (0.2–0.3 in).

The leaves are sessile (they grow directly from the stem), somewhat heart-shaped at the base, otherwise ovate (oval-shaped) to lanceolate (shaped like a lance tip), dentate (toothed) and scabrid (a little rough to the touch). The stem, which stands upright, can be simple or branched, is four-angled and often streaked or spotted black.

The yellow flowers are 13 to 15 millimetres (0.5 to 0.6 in) across and have a straight tube for the petals. The silvery-coloured fruit is a dry capsule, which contains loose, rattling seeds when ripe that give the plant one of its common names.

The herbalist Nicholas Culpeper, in his The English Physician (first published in 1652), wrote of yellow rattle as being "good for cough, or dimness of sight". The plant has a reputation of being toxic to animals. The seeds contain iridoids which cause them to have a bitter taste.

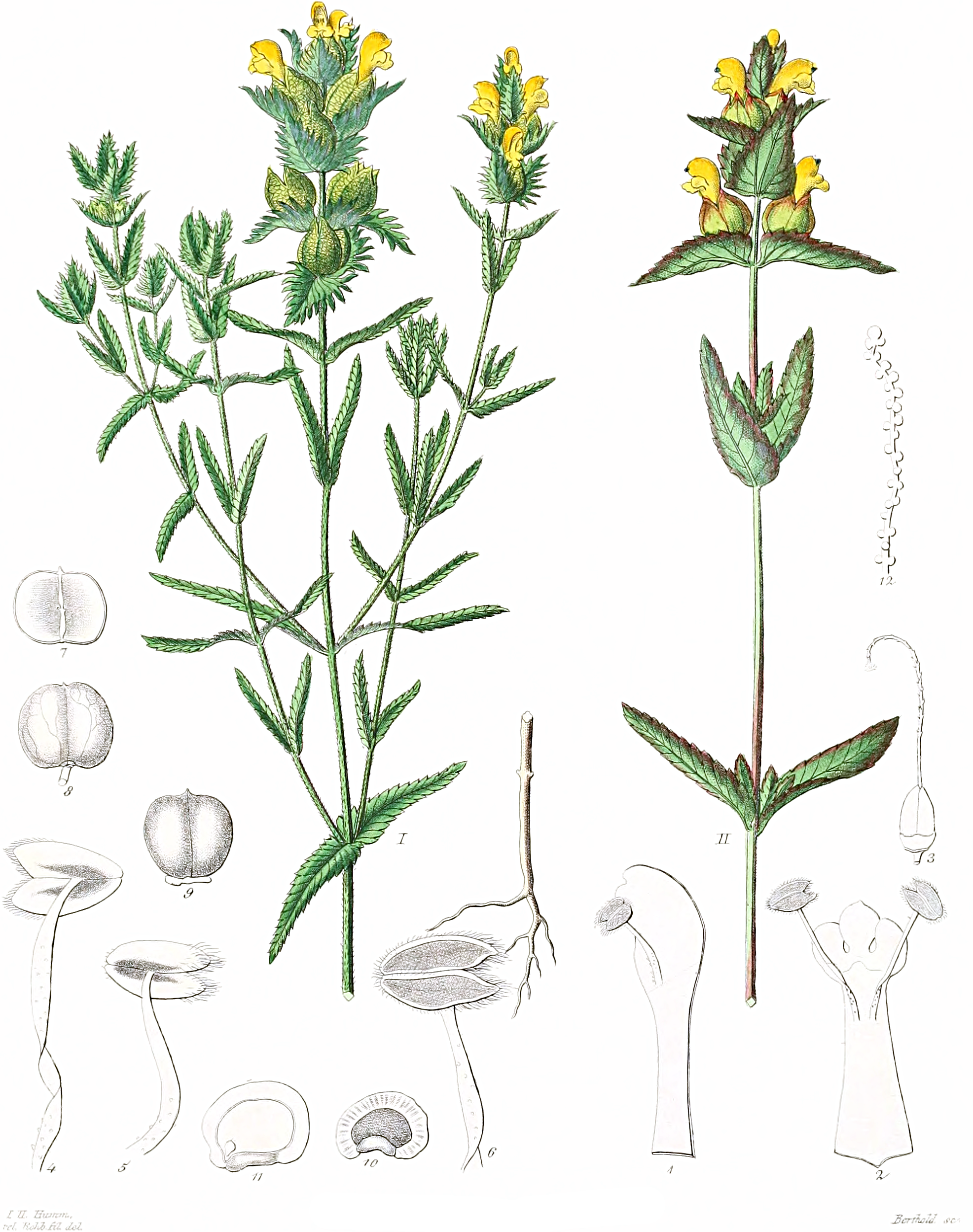
Rhinanthus minor, from Icones Florae Germanicae et Helveticae, 1862

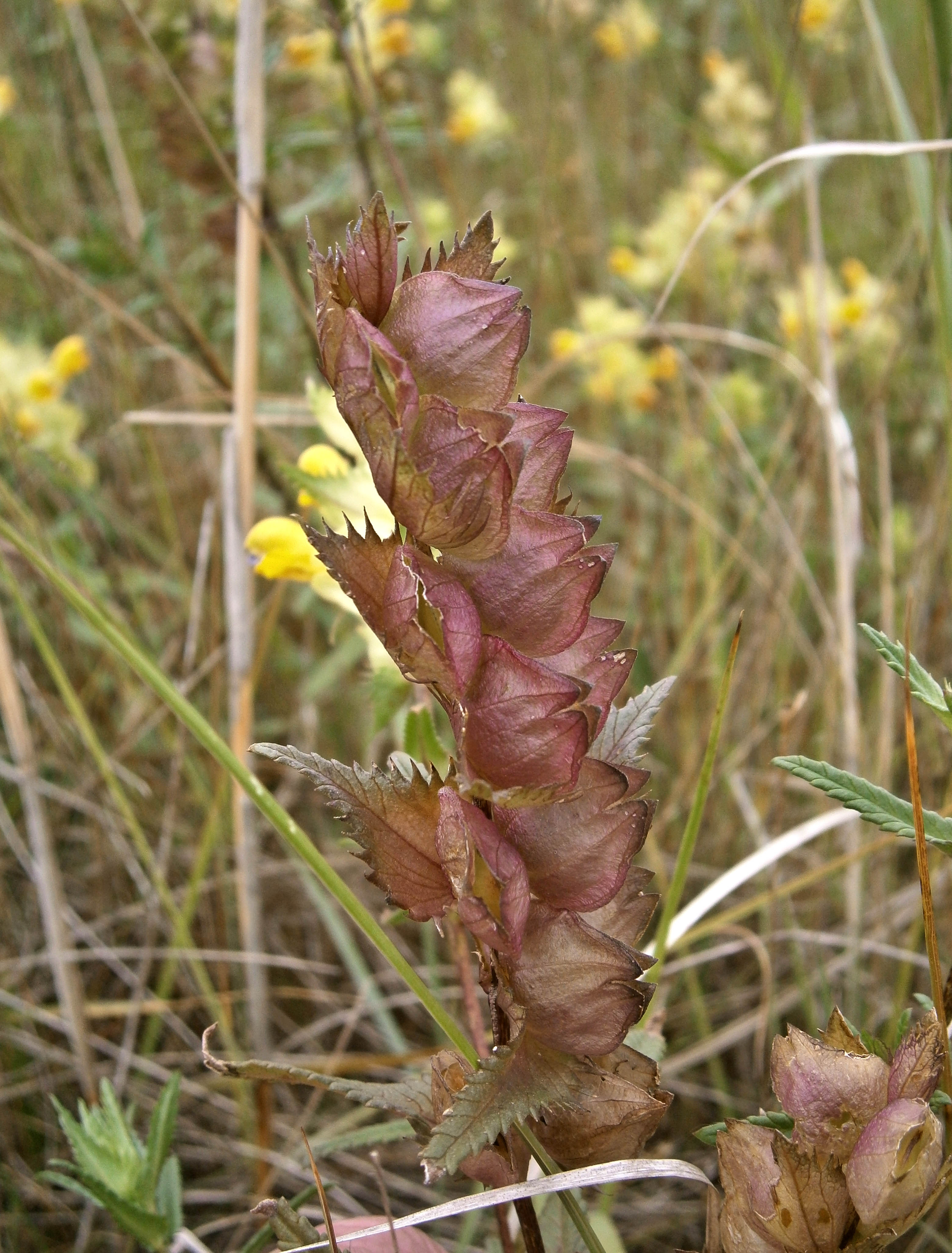
Fruits: when dry, the seeds rattle inside the capsules, giving the plant its name.

== Taxonomy ==
Rhinanthus minor is a flowering plant in the genus Rhinanthus in the family Orobanchaceae. It was described by the Swedish taxonomist Carl Linnaeus in volume 3 of Amoenitates Academici (1756). The species name is derived from Ancient Greek and means 'nose flower', which is in reference to the shape of the upper lip of the corolla. Minor means 'smaller'. It is classified in the genus Rhinanthus within the family Orobanchaceae.

According to Plants of the World Online it has four accepted subspecies:

- Rhinanthus minor subsp. calcareus – Endemic to Great Britain
- Rhinanthus minor subsp. lintonii – Endemic to Great Britain
- Rhinanthus minor subsp. minor – Native to Europe and western Asia, introduced widely
- Rhinanthus minor subsp. monticola – France, Great Britain, and Ireland

The synonyms of Rhinanthus minor and its four subspecies include 50 species names.

== Distribution and ecology ==
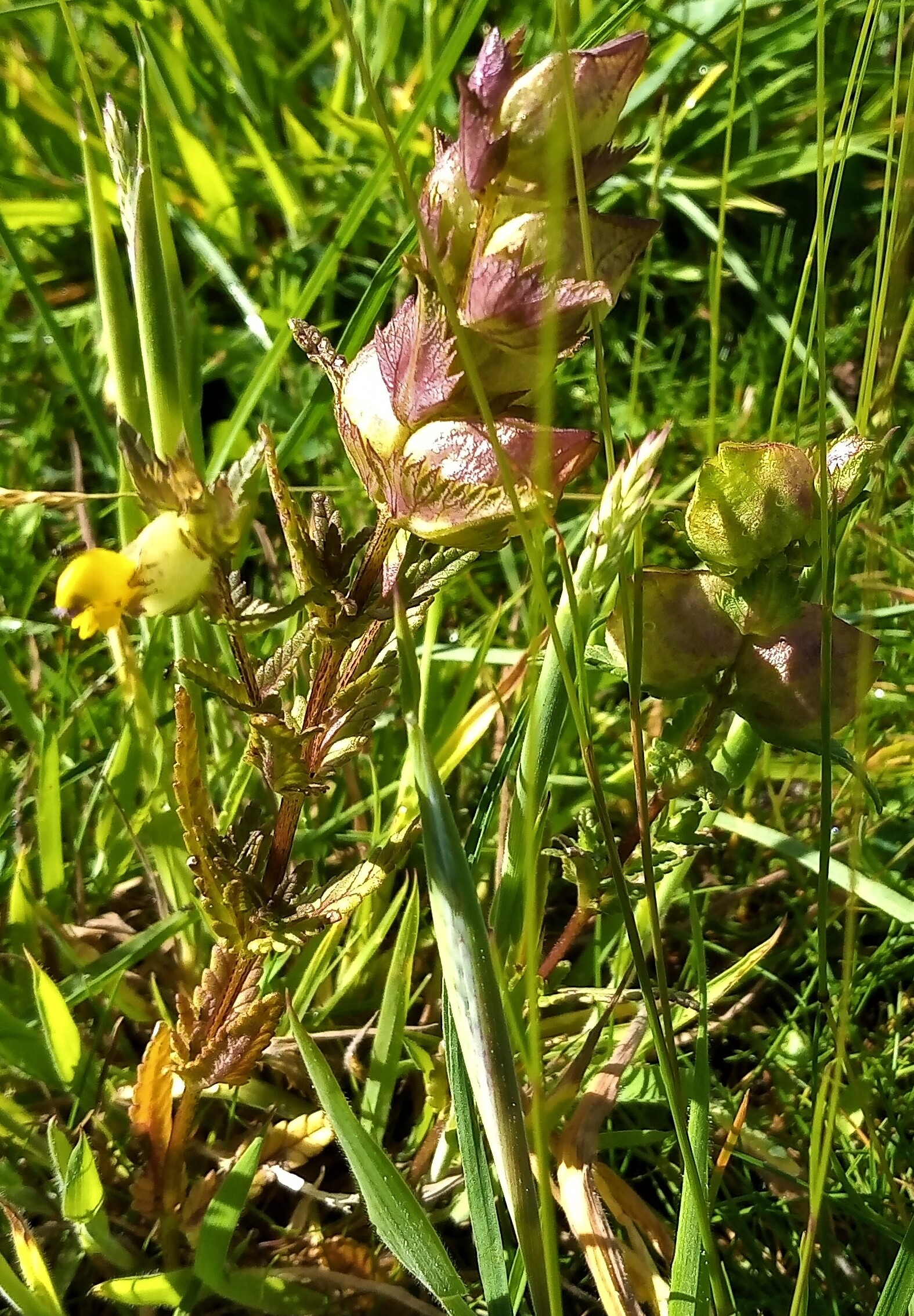
Yellow rattle plants with flowers and seed capsules

Rhinanthus minor is found in Europe, western Russia, western Siberia, northern USA and throughout Canada. The preferred habitat of Rhinanthus minor is dry fields or meadows, where its flowering period is in the summer between May and September, but it can thrive with semi-natural species-rich water-meadows. It can tolerate a wide range of soil types but does not grow where the soil has a pH less than 5.0. Yellow rattle flowers are pollinated by bumblebees during the summer months; the plant is also capable of self-fertilization.

Yellow rattle is an annual wildflower. It is hemiparasitic, in that it can gain its nutrients by penetrating the roots of neighbouring green plants with its own roots, but is a facultative parasite, in that it acts opportunistically when in contact with a root. The hemiparasitic nature of yellow rattle can result in stunted, unbranched individual specimens. The plant can associate with many different host species, notably Poaceae (grasses) and Fabaceae (legumes).

In Ireland and Scotland, yellow rattle is often associated with Machair habitat, which consists of coastal grassland. The seeds are spread effectively by traditional hay-making practices. Farmers seek to remove it since it affects yields by weakening grass; it is an indicator of poor grassland.

=== Effects on plant community structure ===
Yellow rattle can change the structure of plant communities through its parasitism. Vulnerability to attack varies across host taxa, with forbs developing lignified barriers to obstruct the parasite.

Research, including that at the UK's Centre for Ecology and Hydrology, has shown that encouraging it to grow in hay meadows greatly increases biodiversity, by restricting grass growth and thereby allowing other species to thrive. As of 2021 a majority of studies had found positive or neutral effects of the introduction of Rhinanthus spp. on grassland species richness and diversity, with most finding a negative effect on grasses.

=== Conservation status ===
Rhinanthus minor is found in low-lying fields with poor quality soil. It is currently not under threat; as such it is rated as of Least Concern (LC).

Being an annual, it is not found in regularly mown or grazed grassland where the seeds are not provided with an opportunity to spread over the ground. The lack of a seed bank for yellow rattle means that it depends on seed produced from plants during the previous year.

=== Pasture and hay field infestation ===
In the northeastern United States, yellow rattle is considered a pest, as it directly decreases crop yields of grass and hay through its parasitism. Where the plant is found to have infested farmland it has to be suppressed; non-herbicidal strategies for removing it include the application of wood ash and sawdust on affected pastures.

== Uses and cultivation ==
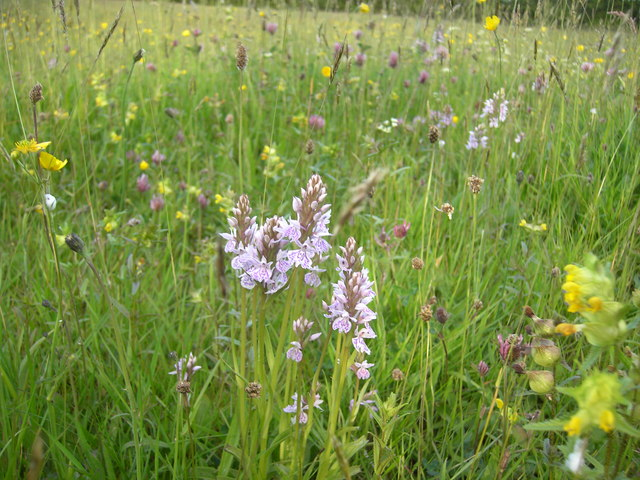
A traditional pasture in England containing yellow rattle

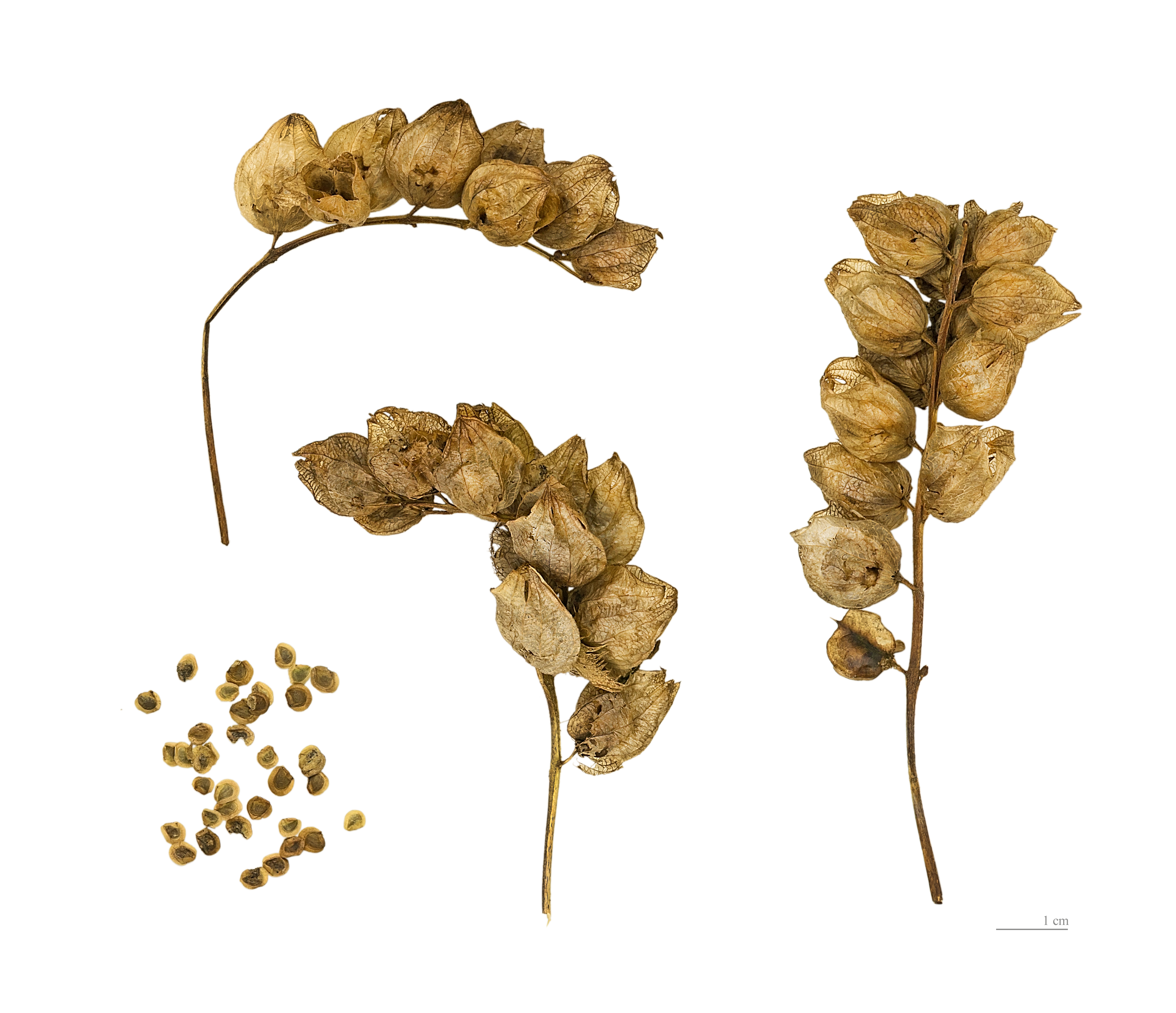
Capsules and seeds

Yellow rattle is used to proactively create or restore wildflower meadows. It is used to reduce the dominance of grasses, when more expensive methods, such as removing the nutrient-rich topsoil, or impractical methods, such as changing the timing and intensity of grazing, cannot be used. This improves the chances of other species of flowers becoming established. According to Natural England, the optimum density of yellow rattle plants needed to enable other species to be introduced is 100 to 200 per m^{2}. Studies have shown that the plant's role in maintaining species diversity is through differential growth suppression effects and enhanced soil nutrient recycling.

The yellow rattle seed is sown thinly onto grassland where gaps have been created, or where all the grass has been cut back and the clippings removed. (Note: Natural England suggests a sowing rate of between 0.5 to 2.5 kilograms (1.1 to 5.5 lb) of seed per hectare.) Seeds can be also be introduced by the spreading of green hay. The grass should be kept short until the beginning of March, after which the seedlings become established.

After the yellow rattle plants have germinated and matured, the fruits shed their seeds. The meadow hay is cut and removed to encourage the growth introduced wild flowers. The seed, which is short-lived, is sown in the autumn, using seed harvested that year. The seeds have to remain on or under the ground throughout the cold months of winter in order to germinate in the spring.

== Sources ==
- Chaudron, Clémence; Mazalová, Monika; Kuras, Tomáš; Malenovský, Igor; Mládek, Jan (2021). "Introducing ecosystem engineers for grassland biodiversity conservation: A review of the effects of hemiparasitic Rhinanthus species on plant and animal communities at multiple trophic levels". Perspectives in Plant Ecology, Evolution and Systematics. 52 125633. Elsevier. Bibcode:2021PPEES..5225633C. doi:10.1016/j.ppees.2021.125633.
- Culpepper, Nicholas (1860) [1652]. Culpeper's Complete Herbal: consisting of a comprehensive description of nearly all herbs with their medicinal properties and directions for compounding the medicines extracted from them. Halifax: Milner and Sowerby – via Internet Archive.
- Gibson, C. C.; Watkinson, A. R. (1989). "The host range and selectivity of a parasitic plant: Rhinanthus minor L". Oecologia. 78 (3): 401–406. Bibcode:1989Oecol..78..401G. doi:10.1007/BF00379116. JSTOR 4218881. PMID 28312588. S2CID 5524301.
- Gledhill, David (2008). The Names of Plants (4th ed.). Cambridge University Press. ISBN 978-0-521-68553-5.
- Hessayon, D. G. (2009). The Green Garden Expert. London: Transworld. ISBN 978-09035-0-563-5.
- Jiang, Fan; Jeschke, W. Dieter; Hartung, Wolfram; Cameron, Duncan D. (2010). "Interactions Between Rhinanthus minor and Its Hosts: A Review of Water, Mineral Nutrient and Hormone Flows and Exchanges in the Hemiparasitic Association". Folia Geobotanica. 45 (4). Springer: 369–385. Bibcode:2010FolGe..45..369J. doi:10.1007/S12224-010-9093-2. S2CID 24274292.
- Liu, Hung-Wen (Ben); Mander, Lew, eds. (2010). Comprehensive Natural Products II: Chemistry and Biology. Elsevier. ISBN 978-0-08-045382-8.
- POWO (2025a). "Rhinanthus minor L." Plants of the World Online. Royal Botanic Gardens, Kew.
- POWO (2025b). "Rhinanthus minor subsp. calcareus (Wilmott) E.F.Warb". Plants of the World Online. Royal Botanic Gardens, Kew.
- POWO (2025c). "Rhinanthus minor subsp. lintonii (Wilmott) P.D.Sell". Plants of the World Online. Royal Botanic Gardens, Kew.
- POWO (2025d). "Rhinanthus minor subsp. minor". Plants of the World Online. Royal Botanic Gardens, Kew.
- POWO (2025e). "Rhinanthus minor subsp. monticola (Lamotte) P.Fourn". Plants of the World Online. Royal Botanic Gardens, Kew.
- Press, J. R. (1993). Bob Press's Field Guide to the Wild Flowers of Britain and Europe. London: New Holland. ISBN 978-18536-8-291-9 – via Internet Archive.
- Smith, Richard G.; Cox, Dorn A. (2014). "Effects of Soil Amendments on the Abundance of a Parasitic Weed, Yellow Rattle (Rhinanthus minor) in Hay Fields". Weed Science. 62 (1). Weed Science Society of America: 118–124. Bibcode:2014WeedS..62..118S. doi:10.1614/WS-D-13-00106.1. S2CID 86310829.
- Westbury, Duncan B. (2004). "Rhinanthus minor L." Journal of Ecology. 92 (5): 906–927. Bibcode:2004JEcol..92..906W. doi:10.1111/j.0022-0477.2004.00929.x. S2CID 85392118.
