= Johann Bartsch =

German physician and botanist (1709–1738)

Johann Bartsch (1709–1738) was a German physician.

Bartsch was born in Königsberg, and graduated in the Netherlands at Leiden University in 1737. His Thesis de Calore Corporis Humani hygraulico is the only work he published. He was much attached to the science of botany, which led him to seek the society of Carl Linnaeus, who was on a year-long visit to Boerhaave at Leiden. No fewer than 47 letters of Bartsch to Linnaeus from 1736 and 1737 survive, and Bartsch assisted Linnaeus with the publication of Flora Lapponica. By the solicitation of Linnaeus, who had to decline the offer himself, Bartsch was sent by Boerhaave to Suriname, where he died six months after his arrival, having responded badly to the climate. Linnaeus has perpetuated his name by denominating a genus of plants (Bartsia) after him.
