= Bartsiella =

Scientific classification
- Kingdom: Plantae
- Clade: Tracheophytes
- Clade: Angiosperms
- Clade: Eudicots
- Clade: Asterids
- Order: Lamiales
- Family: Orobanchaceae
- Tribe: Rhinantheae
- Genus: Bartsiella; Bolliger
- Species: B. rameauana

Binomial name
- Bartsiella rameauana (Emb.) Bolliger

Genus of flowering plants in the broomrape family

Bartsiella is a monotypic genus of flowering plants, initially classified in Scrophulariaceae, and now within the broomrape family Orobanchaceae. It contains a unique species, Bartsiella rameauana.

== Etymology ==
Bartsiella was named after Johann Bartsch (Latinized as Johannes Bartsius, 1709-1738), a botanist of Königsberg. It refers to another genus of Orobanchaceae, Bartsia, named for Johann Bartsch by his associate Carl Linnaeus.
