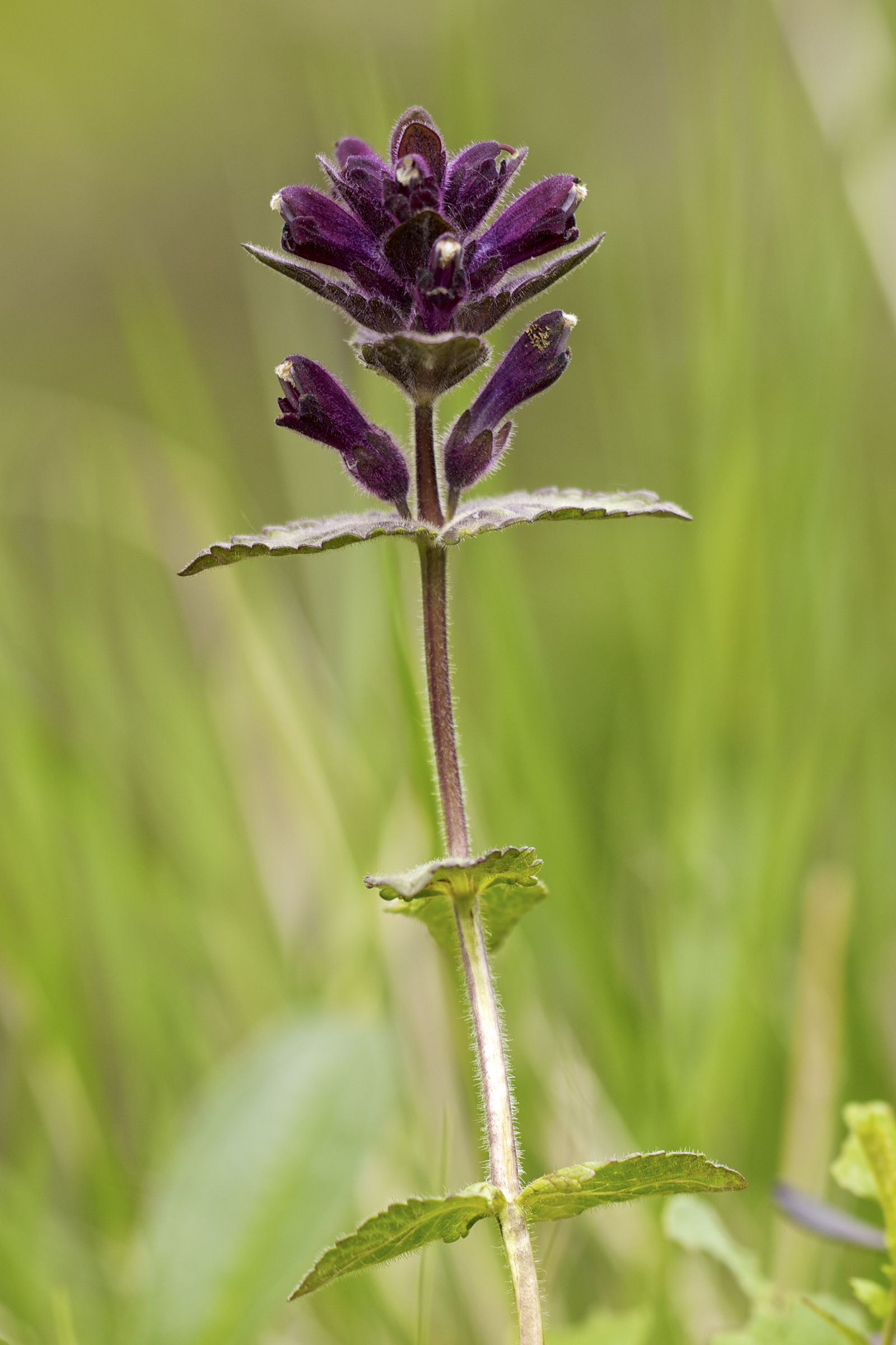
- Flower in Norway

Scientific classification
- Kingdom: Plantae
- Clade: Tracheophytes
- Clade: Angiosperms
- Clade: Eudicots
- Clade: Asterids
- Order: Lamiales
- Family: Orobanchaceae
- Genus: Bartsia
- Species: B. alpina

Binomial name
- Bartsia alpina L.

Synonyms
- Homotypic: Bartsia alpina var. jensenii Lange; Bartsia carnea Griseb.; Bartsia parviflora Thomas; Bartsia parviflora Charpent. ex Benth.; Heterotypic: Alicosta alpina (L.) Dulac; Bellardia carnea (Griseb.) Wettst.; Euphrasia alpina (L.) Bubani; Rhinanthus alpinus (L.) Lam.; Staehelinia alpina (L.) Crantz; Trixago carnea Griseb.

= Bartsia alpina =

Species of flowering plant in the broomrape family

Bartsia alpina is a species of perennial flowering plant, known by the common name alpine bartsia or velvetbells. It is found in the mountainous regions of Europe, and also occurs in Iceland, Greenland and north-eastern Canada.

== Description ==
Bartsia alpina is a hemiparasitic perennial plant with a woody rhizome, growing to a height of between 8 and 30 cm (3 and 12 in). The stem is erect and sometimes branched, hairy and purple in colour. The leaves are in opposite pairs, with oval leaf blades up to 25 mm (1.0 in) long and toothed margins. At the base of the plant, the leaves are green, but higher up they are tinged with purple. The corolla is dark purple and is about 20 mm (0.8 in) long. It is narrow at the base and has two lips, an obtuse upper lip and a smaller lower one, with three blunt, equal-sized lobes. It has four stamens fused to the corolla and two ovaries fused to the style. The fruit is an oval brown capsule.

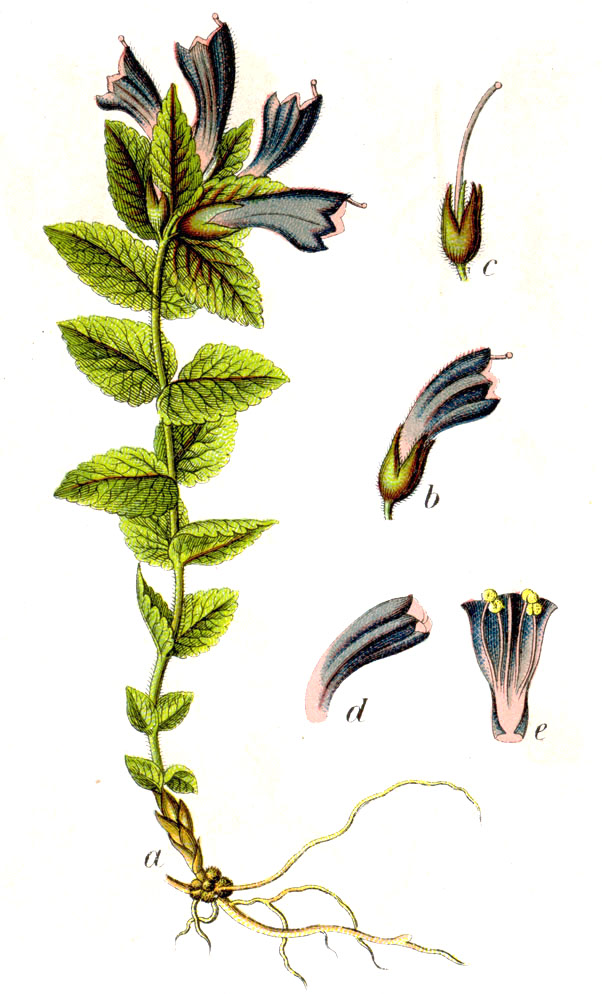
Botanical illustration by Jacob Sturm, 1796

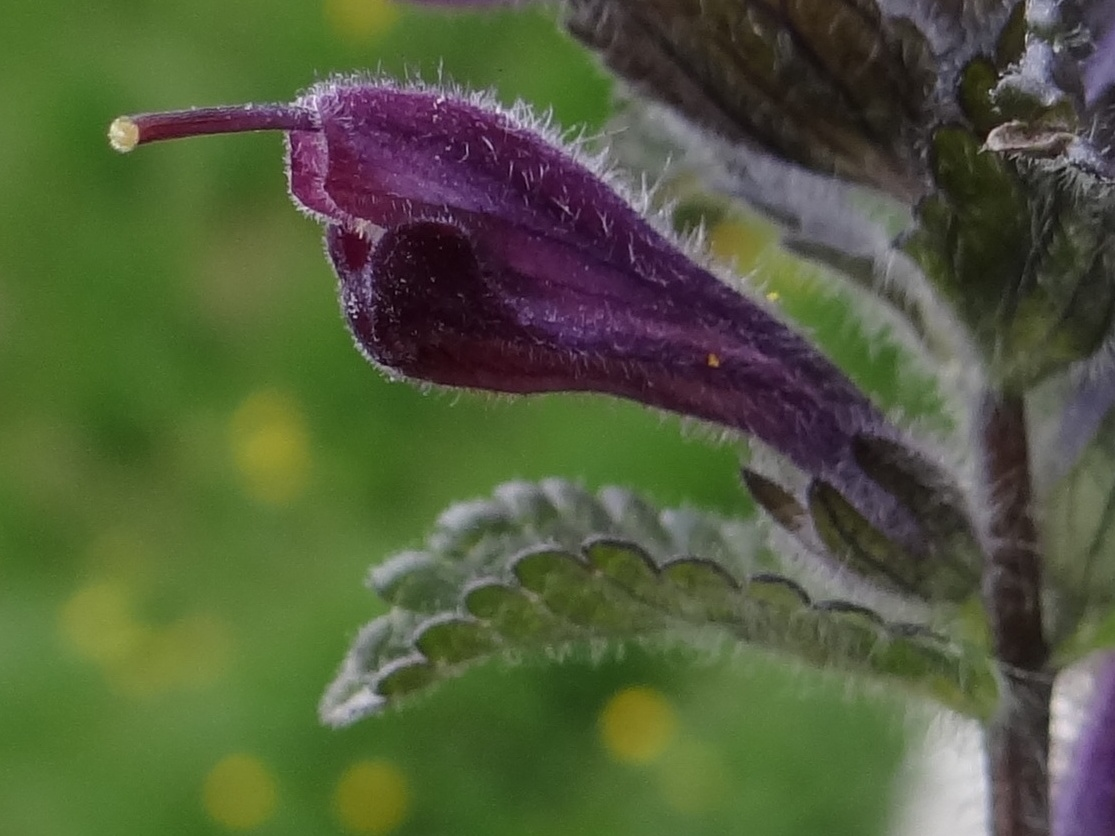
Closeup of flower

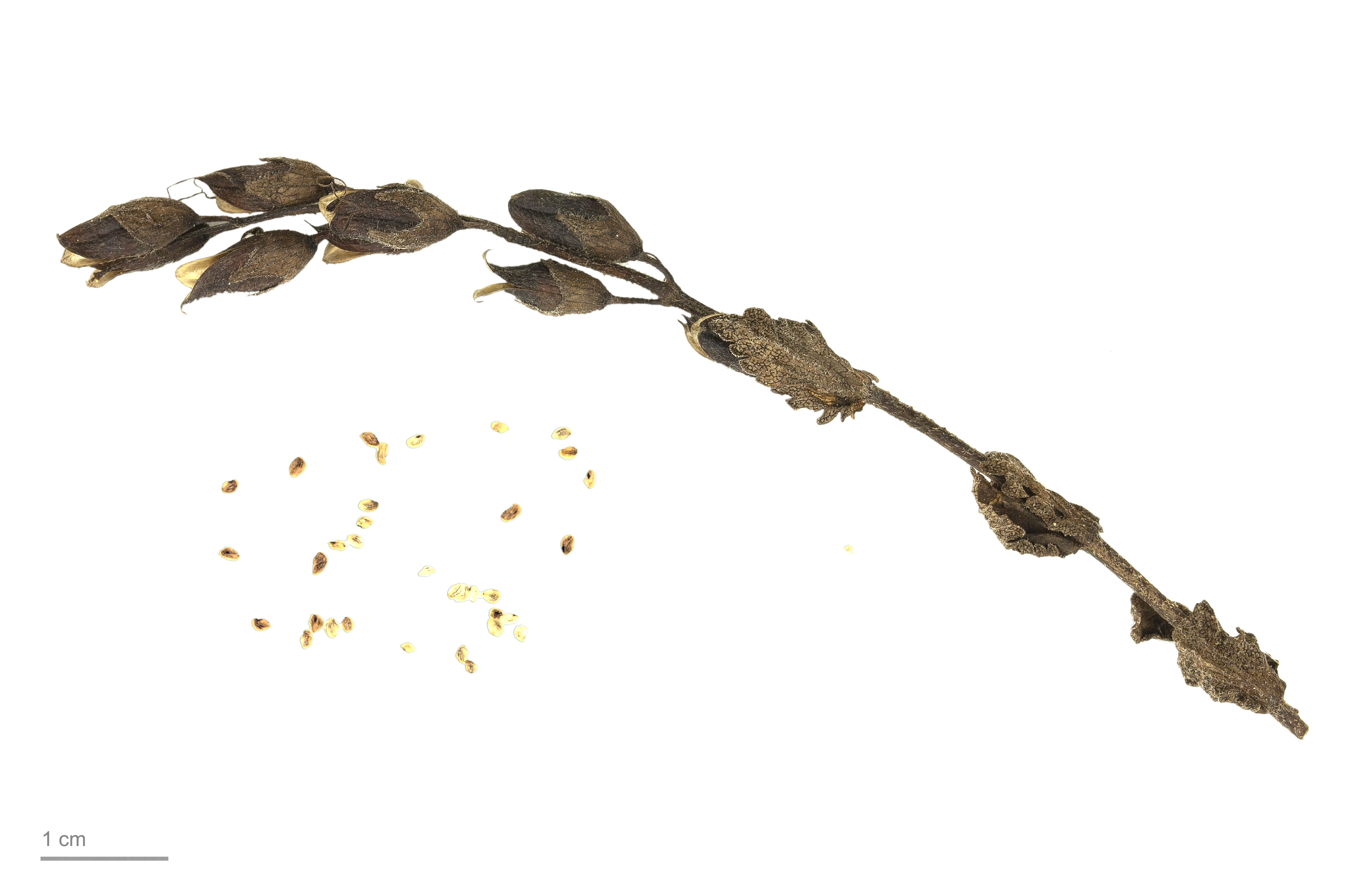
Bartsia alpina - MHNT

== Distribution and habitat ==
Bartsia alpina has a European Arctic-montane distribution, and is also known from North America. It occurs in the mountainous regions of northern Russia, Finland, Norway and Sweden, and in the Alps and other mountains in Central Europe, as far south as the Pyrenees and south-west Bulgaria; it also occurs in Iceland, Greenland and north-eastern Canada.

It has a very restricted distribution in the British Isles, occurring only in a few locations in upland areas in northern England, and in the central Scottish Highlands. It used to occur in damp pasture, in basic flushes and runnels and wet, steep, species-rich banks, but it has largely been eliminated from these habitats by over-grazing and trampling by livestock. It has persisted better away from grazing animals in ledge communities on mica-schist crags.
