= Cancer root =

Cancer root is a common name for several plants in the family Orobanchaceae, particularly genera:

- Aphyllon
- Conopholis
- Orobanche
