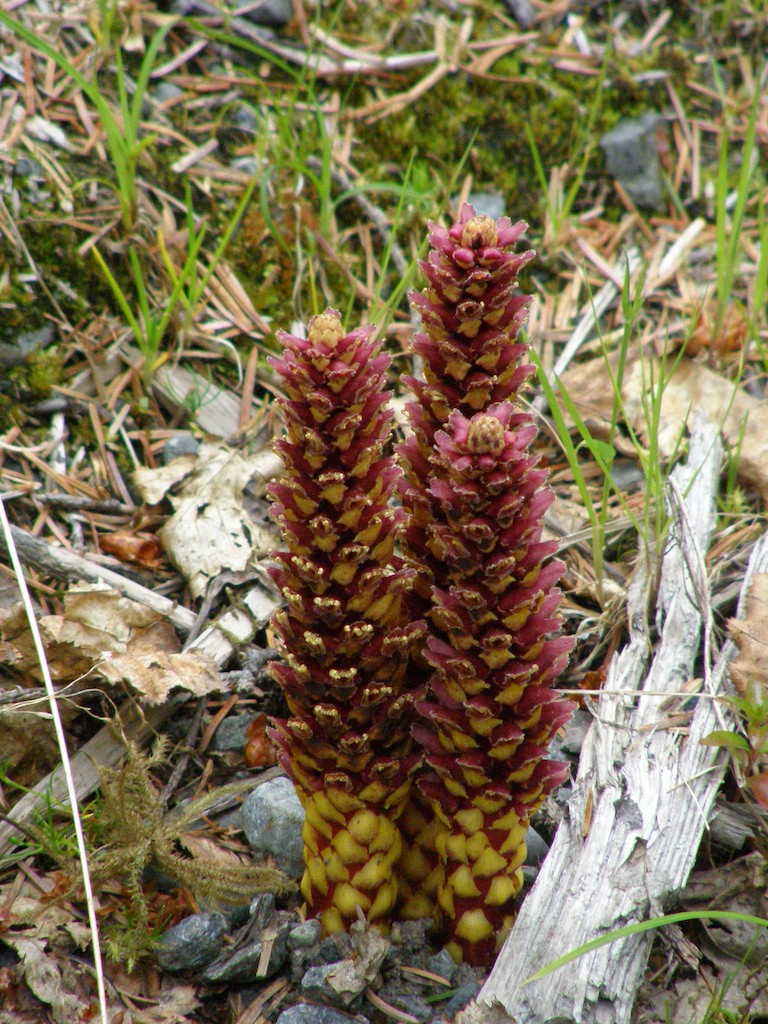

Scientific classification
- Kingdom: Plantae
- Clade: Tracheophytes
- Clade: Angiosperms
- Clade: Eudicots
- Clade: Asterids
- Order: Lamiales
- Family: Orobanchaceae
- Genus: Boschniakia
- Species: B. rossica

Binomial name
- Boschniakia rossica (Cham. & Schltdl.) B.Fedtsch.

Synonyms
- Boschniakia rossica var. flavida Yue Zhang & J.Y.Ma; Lathraea amentacea Schltdl. ex Ledeb.; Lathraea strobilacea Schltdl. ex Ledeb.; Orobanche rossica Cham. & Schltdl.; Stellara lathraeoides Fisch. ex Reut.

= Boschniakia rossica =

Species of plant

Boschniakia rossica, commonly known as the northern groundcone, is a holoparasitic plant that lives in the northern latitudes of the northern hemisphere. In the Pacific Northwest Temperate Rainforest, it does not grow south of Prince of Wales Island, beyond that boundary is the Vancouver groundcone habitat. It does not contain chlorophyll, so it must be parasitic to obtain nutrients. It specializes on Alnus species, but can parasitize off of other trees and shrubs such as on Betula (birch), Salix (willow), Vaccinium (blueberry), Picea (spruce), and Chamaedaphne (leatherleaf shrub). This organism is likely to be found at mid elevations alongside rivers and streams, where moisture is abundant. This species propagates itself through water flow. In some places bears are known to have eaten the starchy roots, or tubers, of this plant.

== Morphology ==
Boschniakia rossica grows between six and twelve inches tall, with two or three stems per individual. It has tall slender stalks. The roots grow horizontally from a main bulbous mass. It can vary from very dark maroon to reddish brown in color. This is a perennial plant, and flowers every summer. It can produce up to 300,000 seeds. B. rossica very much looks like a pine cone growing up out of the ground.

== Common names ==
- Poque
- Cao-cong-rong (China)
- Oniku (Japan)
- Orinamudeobusari (Korea)
- Du’iinahshèe (Gwichya Gwich'in)
- Doo’iinahshìh/Tsʼeedichi (Teetå'it Gwich'in)
- Dotsonʼ ggooneeggeʼ (Koyukon, Lower & Central dialects)
- Dotsonʼ chʼecheneʼ (Koyukon, Upper dialect)
- Tulukkam nauligaafa (Inuit)
- Uktschutsch (Kamtschadalis)

== Taxonomy ==
Genetic analyses have been conducted on B. rossica to determine its phylogeny. There are many ways to phylogenetically classify B. rossica, but scientists from Ohio State University have determined that the family Orobanchaceae is estimated to have originated about 52.2 million years ago. The strongest bootstrap support is for terminal clades. The most parsimonious tree of Boschniakia forms a grade with Conopholis and Epifagus as well as other species of Orobanche. In this tree, Lindenbergia and Schwalbea are sister taxa. These are still hypotheses, and further research is being conducted.

There are two GenBank numbers referring to Boschniakia rossica: AY911214, and rps2;ITS : DQ403779; AY911214.

=== Synonyms ===
The following species are considered synonyms to Boschniakia rossica:

- Boschniakia glabra (C.A. Mey. ex Bong.)
- Orobanchae glabra (C.A. Mey. ex Bong.) Hook.
- Orobanchae rossica Cham. & Schltdl.
