= Magdalenaea =

Scientific classification
- Kingdom: Plantae
- Clade: Tracheophytes
- Clade: Angiosperms
- Clade: Eudicots
- Clade: Asterids
- Order: Lamiales
- Family: Orobanchaceae
- Genus: Magdalenaea; Brade
- Species: M. limae

Binomial name
- Magdalenaea limae Brade

Genus of plants

Magdalenaea is a monotypic genus of perennial flowering plants belonging to the family Orobanchaceae. The only species is Magdalenaea limae.

Its native range is Southeastern Brazil, found in the state of Rio de Janeiro, in the Serra dos Órgãos mountain range.

== Taxonomy ==
The genus and species were first described by German botanist Alexander Curt Brade in 1935.

== Description ==
The habit of the particular species, Magdalenaea limae, takes form of a perennial subshrub or shrub. The stems are erect, rigid and branched.

The pale-green leaves are oppositely-arranged, subsessile, ovate and acute in shape. Leaves are usually thick, 2 to 3.5 centimeters long and 1.2 to 2.2 centimeters wide. Both sides are glabrous. Leaf margin is obscurely few-toothed.

Flowers form terminal axillary racemes. Flower bracts are smaller than leaves, yet similar. Pedicels are singular, erect when open, measuring 2.5 to 3 centimeters long each. Flower bracteoles are oppositely-arranged and lanceolate and 0.5 centimeters long, 1-1.5 millimeters wide. The calyx is green, spherical and are both smooth and glabrous. The calyx is twice as long as the flower's corolla at about 5 centimeters long.

The fruit is a spherical capsule, shortly acute, measured to be 1.5 centimeters wide and 1.7 centimeters long. The fruit bears multiple seeds, which are brown in color and have a brown testa (seed coat).

Similarly to other genera of the Orobanchaceae family, it is considered to be hemiparasitic due to not completely relying on other plants for nutrients and water through root connections, being able to perform photosynthesis on its own.

== See also ==
• Nothochilus

• Physocalyx
