= Silviella =

Silviella may refer to:

- Silviella (beetle), a genus of beetles in the family Cleridae
- Silviella (plant), a genus of plants in the family Orobanchaceae
- Silviella, a settlement in Spain (:eswiki)
