= José Mariano de Conceição Vellozo =

Colonial Brazilian botanist (1742–1811)

- Born: 14 October 1742; Tiradentes
- Died: 14 July 1811 (aged 68); Rio de Janeiro
- Notable work: Florae Fluminensis
- Scientific career
- Fields: botany

José Mariano de Conceição Vellozo (also called José Mariano da Conceição Velloso) (1742 – 1811) was a Colonial Brazilian botanist who catalogued specimens, for example: Cedrela fissilis Vell. in Florae Fluminensis (1825–27; 1831). He was born in Tiradentes, formerly called São José do Rio das Mortes, state of Minas Gerais; and died in Rio de Janeiro, state of Rio de Janeiro. While at the University of Coimbra in Portugal in the 1790s he worked with Martim Francisco Ribeiro de Andrada in translating works on mineralogy and agriculture. The standard author abbreviation Vell. is used to indicate this person as the author when citing a botanical name.

The publishing history of Florae Fluminensis is a most curious one. Encouraged by the Viceroy, Luiz de Vasconcelos, Vellozo spent 25 years studying and collecting the Brazilian flora. In 1790 he voyaged to Lisbon, intent on publication of his work, with descriptions of 1640 species and 1700 illustrations, created by Friar Francisco Solano and Antonio Alvares. In 1792 the Portuguese government approved publishing and sent the illustrations to Venice for engraving. When 554 plates had been completed the French invaded Portugal, and the Portuguese government relocated to Brazil, Vellozo returning to the monastery in Rio de Janeiro, where he died in 1811, having left his manuscripts to the Royal Library.

They were later discovered by Friar Antonio de Arrábida, and Emperor Pedro I ordered that the work be published. The plates were taken to the eminent lithographer Senefelder in Paris. Pedro I commissioned a print run of 3000 copies, a decision considered excessive by F.J. Knecht, the successor to Senefelder, and various Parisian scientists. The Brazilian government, though, was not to be deterred, and when printing was close to completion they cancelled the contract, because of political turmoil which led to the abdication of Emperor Pedro I. Despite these difficulties the printing run was finished by Knecht and shipped to Brazil, taking up an enormous amount of space in the Government offices. The Brazilian government never did settle their account and only a small number of copies were distributed.

In 1888, botanist Henri Ernest Baillon published Vellosiella, which is a genus of hemiparasitic (a parasite under natural conditions, but remains photosynthetic to at least some degree) flowering plants from South America, belonging to the family Orobanchaceae. It was named in José Mariano de Conceição Vellozo's honor. Then in 1917, botanist Eugenio dos Santos Rangel published Mycovellosiella, a genus of fungi belonging to the family Mycosphaerellaceae.

== Works ==
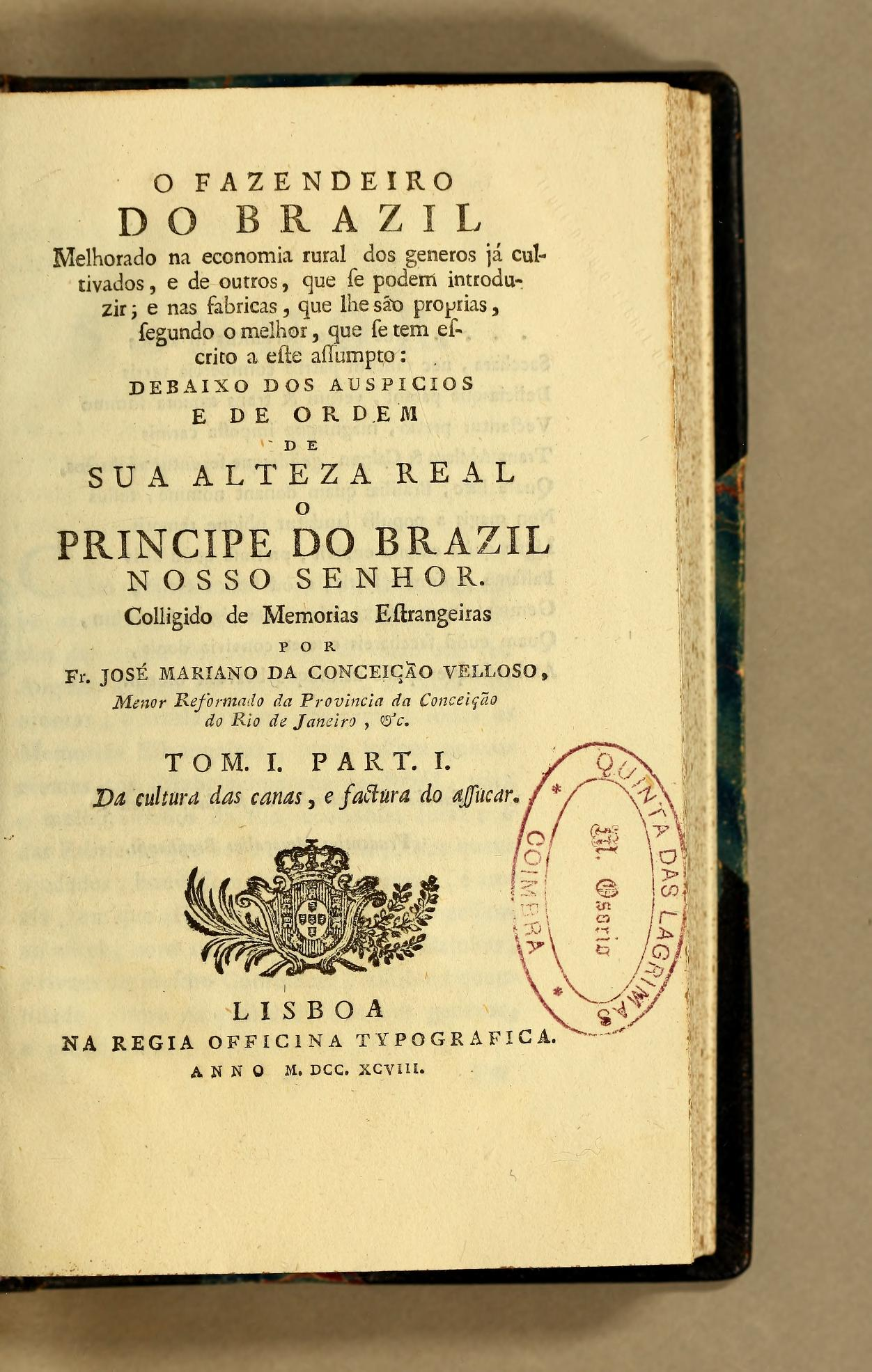
Title page, O fazendeiro do Brazil (Lisbon, 1798)

- Dickson James; Vellozo (ed.) Plantarum Cryptogamicarum Britanniae Lusitanorum Botanicorum (1800)
- Florae Fluminensis (1825–27; 1831) Main work
- O Fazendeiro do Brasil (1798–1806)

== Other sources ==
- Carauta, J. P. P. The Text of Vellozo's Flora Fluminensis and Its Effective Date of Publication Taxon, Vol. 22, No. 2/3 (May, 1973), pp. 281–284.
