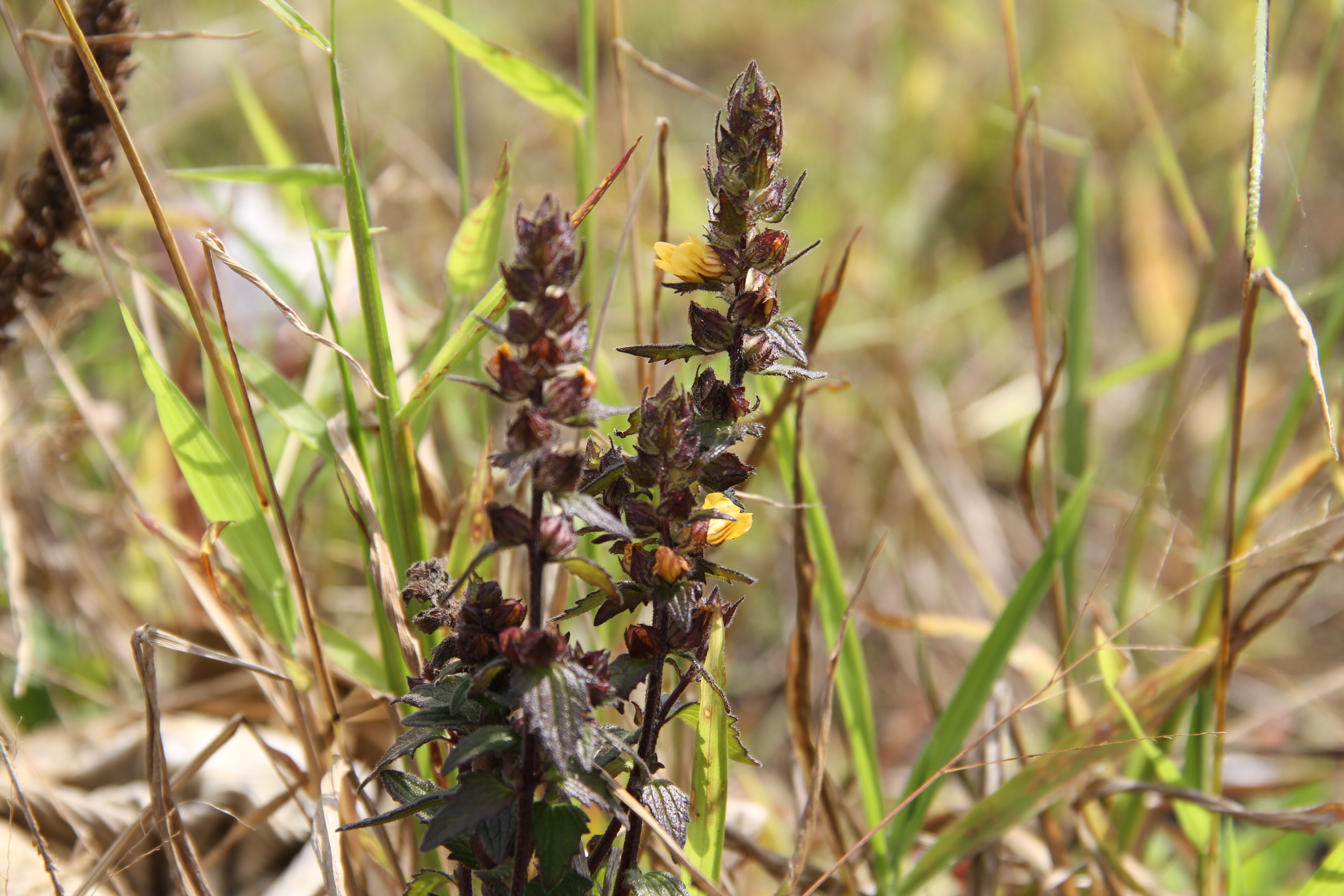
- Alectra sessiliflora

Scientific classification
- Kingdom: Plantae
- Clade: Tracheophytes
- Clade: Angiosperms
- Clade: Eudicots
- Clade: Asterids
- Order: Lamiales
- Family: Orobanchaceae
- Tribe: Buchnereae
- Genus: Alectra; Thunb., 1784

Synonyms
- Contarenia Vand. (Note: Fl. Lusit. Bras. Spec.: 42 (1788)); Starbia Thouars (Note: Gen. Nov. Madagasc.: 7 (1806)); Hymenospermum Benth. (Note: Numer. List: n.º 3963 (1831)); Pseudorobanche Rouy (Note: Rev. Gén. Bot. 21: 204 (1909))

= Alectra (plant) =

Genus of flowering plants in the broomrape family

Alectra is a genus of flowering plants in the family Orobanchaceae. It comprises hemiparasitic species which occur in tropical and southern Africa, including Madagascar, and tropical and subtropical Asia.

== Systematics ==
The genera Alectra comprises the following species.

- Alectra alectroides (S.Moore) Melch.
- Alectra atrosanguinea (Hiern) Hemsl.
- Alectra aurantiaca Hemsl.
- Alectra avensis (Benth.) Merr.
- Alectra bainesii Hemsl.
- Alectra basserei Berhaut
- Alectra basutica (E.Phillips) Melch.
- Alectra capensis Thunb.
- Alectra dolichocalyx Philcox
- Alectra dunensis Hilliard & B.L.Burtt
- Alectra fruticosa Eb.Fisch.
- Alectra glandulosa Philcox
- Alectra gracilis S.Moore
- Alectra hildebrandtii Eb.Fisch.
- Alectra hirsuta Klotzsch
- Alectra humbertii Eb.Fisch.
- Alectra lancifolia Hemsl.
- Alectra linearis Hepper
- Alectra lurida Harv.
- Alectra natalensis (Hiern) Melch.
- Alectra orobanchoides Benth. syn. A. parvifolia (Engl.) Schinz
- Alectra parasitica A.Rich.
- Alectra picta (Hiern) Hemsl.
- Alectra pseudobarleriae (Dinter) Dinter
- Alectra pubescens Philcox
- Alectra pumila Benth.
- Alectra rigida (Hiern) Hemsl.
- Alectra schoenfelderi Dinter & Melch.
- Alectra sessiliflora (Vahl) Kuntze
- Alectra stolzii Engl.
- Alectra thyrsoidea Melch.
- Alectra virgata Hemsl.
- Alectra vogelii Benth.

Alectra pedicularioides Baker from Madagascar was moved to Pseudomelasma pedicularioides (Baker) Eb.Fisch. in 1996.
