= Thunbergianthus =

Scientific classification
- Kingdom: Plantae
- Clade: Tracheophytes
- Clade: Angiosperms
- Clade: Eudicots
- Clade: Asterids
- Order: Lamiales
- Family: Orobanchaceae
- Genus: Thunbergianthus; Engl.

Genus of flowering plants

Thunbergianthus is a genus of flowering plants belonging to the family Orobanchaceae.

Its native range is Africa.

Species:

- Thunbergianthus quintasii Engl.
- Thunbergianthus ruwenzoriensis R.D.Good
