= Omphalotrix =

Scientific classification
- Kingdom: Plantae
- Clade: Tracheophytes
- Clade: Angiosperms
- Clade: Eudicots
- Clade: Asterids
- Order: Lamiales
- Family: Orobanchaceae
- Genus: Omphalotrix; Maxim.
- Species: O. longipes

Binomial name
- Omphalotrix longipes Maxim.

Genus of plants

Omphalotrix is a monotypic genus of flowering plants belonging to the family Orobanchaceae. The only species is Omphalotrix longipes.

Its native range is Southern Siberia to Russian Far East and Northern China.
