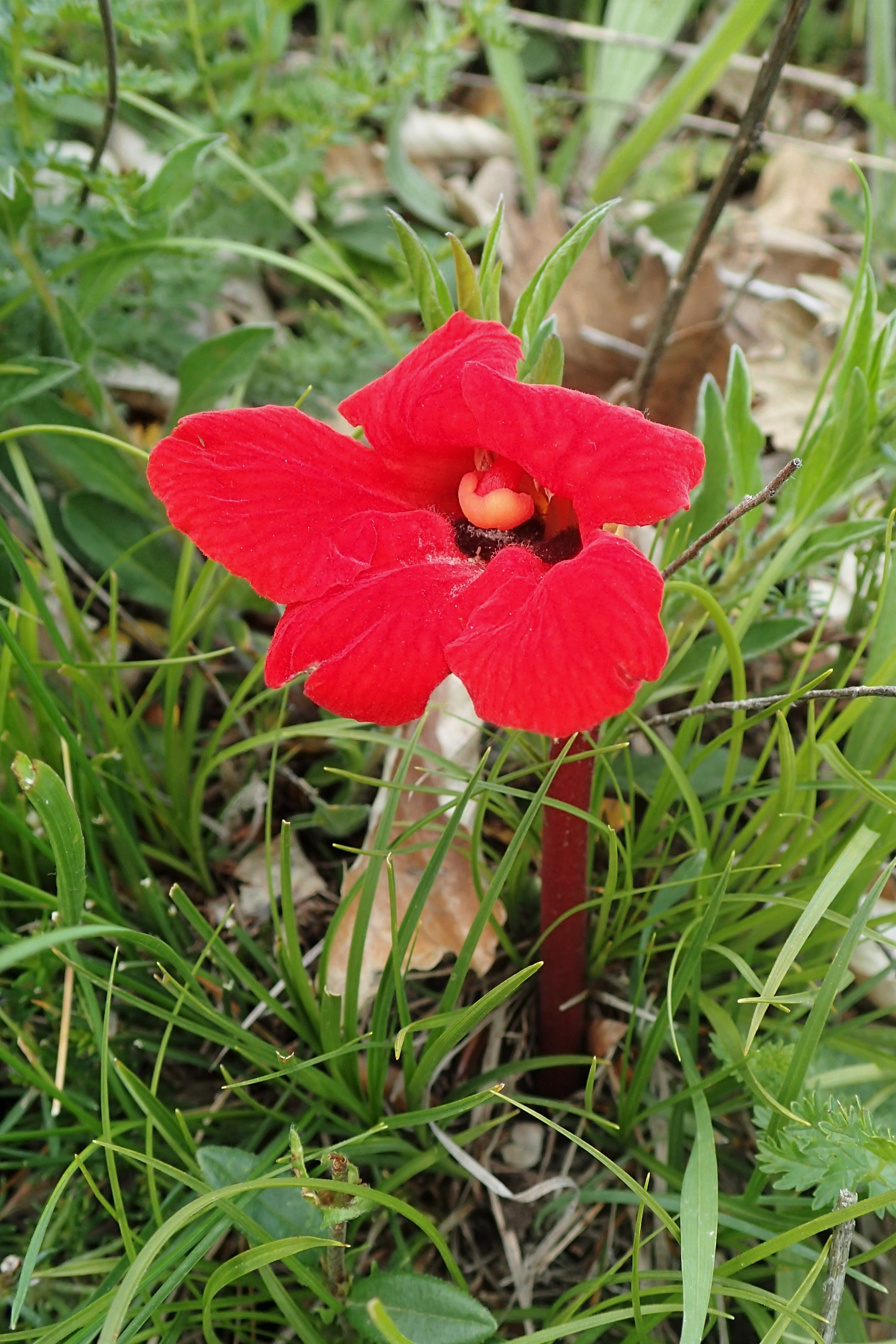
- Phelypaea tournefortii

Scientific classification
- Kingdom: Plantae
- Clade: Tracheophytes
- Clade: Angiosperms
- Clade: Eudicots
- Clade: Asterids
- Order: Lamiales
- Family: Orobanchaceae
- Tribe: Orobancheae
- Genus: Phelypaea; Tourn. ex L.

Species
- See text

Synonyms
- Alatraea Neck.; Anoplanthus Endl.; Anoplon Rchb.; Diphelypaea Nicolson; Phelipea Pers.

= Phelypaea =

Genus of flowering plants

Phelypaea is a genus of flowering plants in the broomrape family Orobanchaceae, native to the Balkans, Greece, Crimea, the Caucasus region, Anatolia, the Levant, Iraq and Iran. They are root parasites which cannot conduct photosynthesis and are only seen above ground when flowering.

== Species ==
Currently accepted species include:

Image	Scientific name	Distribution
	Phelypaea boissieri (Reut.) Stapf	Albania, Greece, Yugoslavia
	Phelypaea coccinea (M.Bieb.) Poir.	Greece, Iran, Krym, Iraq, Lebanon-Syria, Transcaucasus, Turkey
	Phelypaea helenae Popl. ex Sukaczev	Krym
	Phelypaea tournefortii Desf.	Transcaucasus, Turkey
