= Baumia =

Scientific classification
- Kingdom: Plantae
- Clade: Tracheophytes
- Clade: Angiosperms
- Clade: Eudicots
- Clade: Asterids
- Order: Lamiales
- Family: Orobanchaceae
- Genus: Baumia; Engl. & Gilg

Genus of flowering plants

Baumia is a genus of flowering plants belonging to the family Orobanchaceae.

Its native range is Angola.

Species:

- Baumia angolensis Engl. & Gilg
