= Cyclocheilon =

Scientific classification
- Kingdom: Plantae
- Clade: Tracheophytes
- Clade: Angiosperms
- Clade: Eudicots
- Clade: Asterids
- Order: Lamiales
- Family: Orobanchaceae
- Genus: Cyclocheilon; Oliv.

Genus of flowering plants

Cyclocheilon is a genus of flowering plants belonging to the family Orobanchaceae.

Its native range is Northeastern Tropical Africa, Southwestern Arabian Peninsula.

Species:

- Cyclocheilon kelleri Engl.
- Cyclocheilon physocalyx Chiov.
- Cyclocheilon somaliense Oliv.
