= Buttonia =

Scientific classification
- Kingdom: Plantae
- Clade: Tracheophytes
- Clade: Angiosperms
- Clade: Eudicots
- Clade: Asterids
- Order: Lamiales
- Family: Orobanchaceae
- Genus: Buttonia; McKen ex Benth.

Genus of flowering plants

Buttonia is a genus of flowering plants belonging to the family Orobanchaceae.

Its native range is Kenya to Southern Africa.

Species:

- Buttonia natalensis McKen ex Benth.
- Buttonia superba Oberm.
