= Vellosiella =

Scientific classification
- Kingdom: Plantae
- Clade: Tracheophytes
- Clade: Angiosperms
- Clade: Eudicots
- Clade: Asterids
- Order: Lamiales
- Family: Orobanchaceae
- Genus: Vellosiella; Baill.

Genus of flowering plants

Vellosiella is a genus of hemiparasitic (a parasite under natural conditions, but remains photosynthetic to at least some degree) flowering plants belonging to the family Orobanchaceae.

It is native to Guyana and Venezuela in northern South America and southern parts of Brazil.

== Known species ==
As accepted by Kew:

- Vellosiella dracocephaloides (Vell.) Baill.
- Vellosiella spathacea (Oliv.) Melch.
- Vellosiella westermanii Dusén

The genus name of Vellosiella is in honour of José Mariano de Conceição Vellozo (1742–1811), a Colonial Brazilian botanist who catalogued many specimens. It was first described and published in Bull. Mens. Soc. Linn. Paris Vol. 1 n page 715 in 1888.
