= Radamaea =

Scientific classification
- Kingdom: Plantae
- Clade: Tracheophytes
- Clade: Angiosperms
- Clade: Eudicots
- Clade: Asterids
- Order: Lamiales
- Family: Orobanchaceae
- Genus: Radamaea; Benth.

Genus of plants

Radamaea is a genus of flowering plants belonging to the family Orobanchaceae.

Its native range is Madagascar.

Species:

- Radamaea latifolia Bonati
- Radamaea montana Benth.
- Radamaea perrieri (Bonati) Humbert
- Radamaea rupestris Bonati
