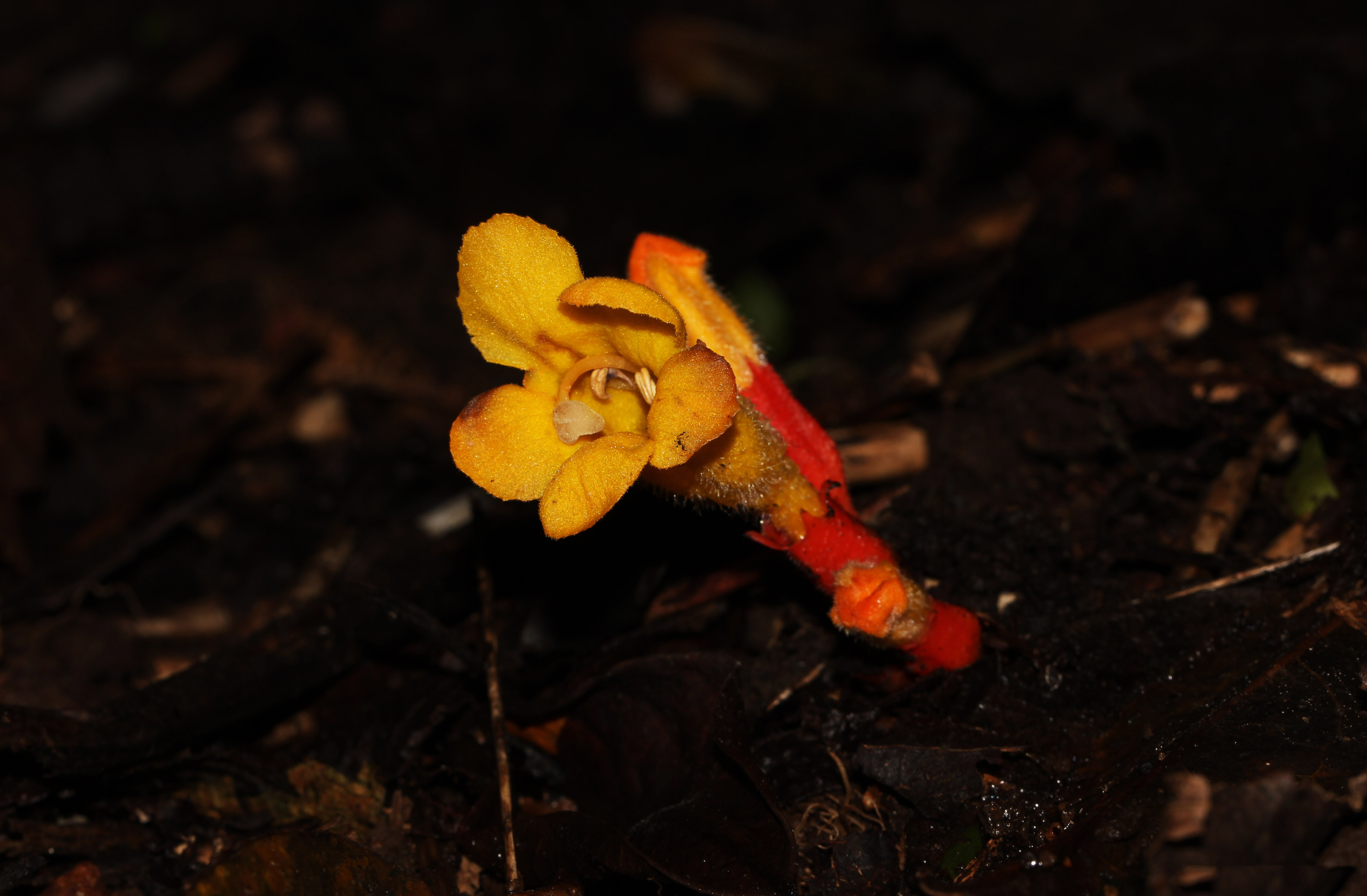

Scientific classification
- Kingdom: Plantae
- Clade: Tracheophytes
- Clade: Angiosperms
- Clade: Eudicots
- Clade: Asterids
- Order: Lamiales
- Family: Orobanchaceae
- Genus: Christisonia; Gardner

= Christisonia =

Genus of flowering plants

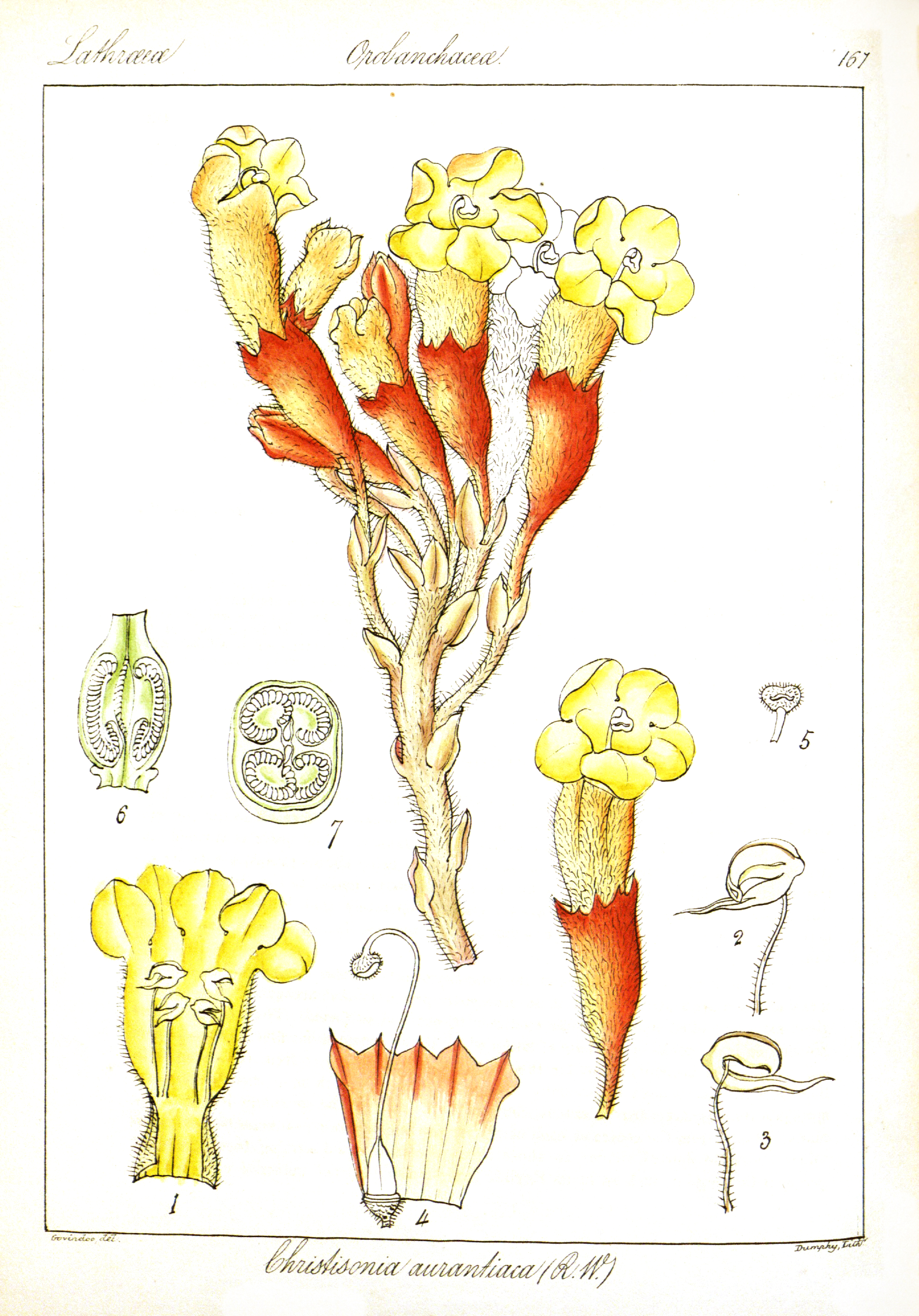
Christisonia bicolor Gardner

Christisonia is a genus of flowering plants belonging to the family Orobanchaceae.

Its native range is Indian subcontinent to Philippines. It is named after the Scottish toxicologist Robert Christison.

Species:

- Christisonia albida Thwaites ex Hook.f.
- Christisonia bicolor Gardner
- Christisonia calcarata Wight
- Christisonia flammea Sedgw.
- Christisonia hookeri C.B.Clarke ex Hook.f.
- Christisonia indica Anil Kumar
- Christisonia keralensis Erady
- Christisonia kwangtungensis (Hu) G.D.Tang, J.F.Liu & W.B.Yu
- Christisonia legocia Beck
- Christisonia mira J.Mathew
- Christisonia rodgeri W.W.Sm. & Banerji
- Christisonia saulierei Dunn
- Christisonia scortechinii Prain
- Christisonia siamensis Craib
- Christisonia sinensis Beck
- Christisonia subacaulis (Benth.) Gardner
- Christisonia thwaitesii Trimen
- Christisonia tomentosa J.Mathew & Kad.V.George
- Christisonia tricolor Gardner
- Christisonia tubulosa (Wight) Benth. ex Hook.f.
- Christisonia unicolor Gardner
- Christisonia wightii Elmer
