= Parasopubia =

Scientific classification
- Kingdom: Plantae
- Clade: Tracheophytes
- Clade: Angiosperms
- Clade: Eudicots
- Clade: Asterids
- Order: Lamiales
- Family: Orobanchaceae
- Genus: Parasopubia; H.-P.Hofm. & Eb.Fisch. (2004)

Species
- Parasopubia bonatii H.-P.Hofm. & Eb.Fisch.; Parasopubia delphiniifolia (L.) H.-P.Hofm. & Eb.Fisch.; Parasopubia hofmannii Pradeep & Pramod; Parasopubia raghavendrae K.V.Divya & Nampy

Synonyms
- Lophanthera Raf. (1837), nom. rej.

Genus of flowering plants

Parasopubia is a genus of flowering plants in the family Orobanchaceae. It includes four species native to the Indian subcontinent (3 species) and Indochina (1 species).

== Species ==
Four species are accepted.

- Parasopubia bonatii H.-P.Hofm. & Eb.Fisch. – Cambodia, Laos, Thailand, and Vietnam
- Parasopubia delphiniifolia (L.) H.-P.Hofm. & Eb.Fisch. – western India and Sri Lanka
- Parasopubia hofmannii Pradeep & Pramod – western and southwestern India
- Parasopubia raghavendrae K.V.Divya & Nampy – India (Kerala)
