= Gerardiina =

Scientific classification
- Kingdom: Plantae
- Clade: Tracheophytes
- Clade: Angiosperms
- Clade: Eudicots
- Clade: Asterids
- Order: Lamiales
- Family: Orobanchaceae
- Genus: Gerardiina; Engl.

Genus of plants

Gerardiina is a genus of flowering plants belonging to the family Orobanchaceae.

Its native range is Southern Africa. It is found in the countries of Angola, Burundi, DRC, Eswatini, Malawi, Mozambique, Northern Provinces (region of South Africa), Tanzania, Zambia and Zimbabwe.

The genus name of Gerardiina is in honour of John Gerard (1545–1612) an English herbalist, and it was first described and published in Bot. Jahrb. Syst. Vol.23 on page 507 in 1897.

Known species:

- Gerardiina angolensis Engl.
- Gerardiina kundelungensis Mielcarek
