= Brachystigma =

Scientific classification
- Kingdom: Plantae
- Clade: Tracheophytes
- Clade: Angiosperms
- Clade: Eudicots
- Clade: Asterids
- Order: Lamiales
- Family: Orobanchaceae
- Genus: Brachystigma; Pennell
- Species: B. wrightii

Binomial name
- Brachystigma wrightii (A.Gray) Pennell

Synonyms
- Agalinis wrightii (A.Gray) Tidestr.; Dasistoma wrightii (A.Gray) Wooton & Standl.; Gerardia wrightii A.Gray

Genus of flowering plants

Brachystigma is a genus of flowering plants belonging to the family Orobanchaceae. It contains one species, Brachystigma wrightii. Its common name is Arizona desert foxglove.

== Description ==
Brachystigma wrightii has yellow tubular bell-shaped flowers, reddish-yellow flower buds and thin needle-like leaves.

== Range ==
It is native to Arizona and New Mexico in the southeastern United States, and to Chihuahua and Sonora in northern Mexico.

== Habitat ==
The species grows on dry mountain slopes and often in oak chaparral.

== Taxonomy ==
The species was described as Gerardia wrightii by Asa Gray in 1859. In 1928 Francis Whittier Pennell placed the species in genus Brachystigma as B. wrightii.
