= Eremitilla =

Scientific classification
- Kingdom: Plantae
- Clade: Tracheophytes
- Clade: Angiosperms
- Clade: Eudicots
- Clade: Asterids
- Order: Lamiales
- Family: Orobanchaceae
- Genus: Eremitilla; Yatsk. & J.L.Contr.
- Species: E. mexicana

Binomial name
- Eremitilla mexicana Yatsk. & J.L.Contr.

Genus of plants

Eremitilla is a monotypic genus of flowering plants belonging to the family Orobanchaceae. The only species is Eremitilla mexicana.

Its native range is Southwestern Mexico.
