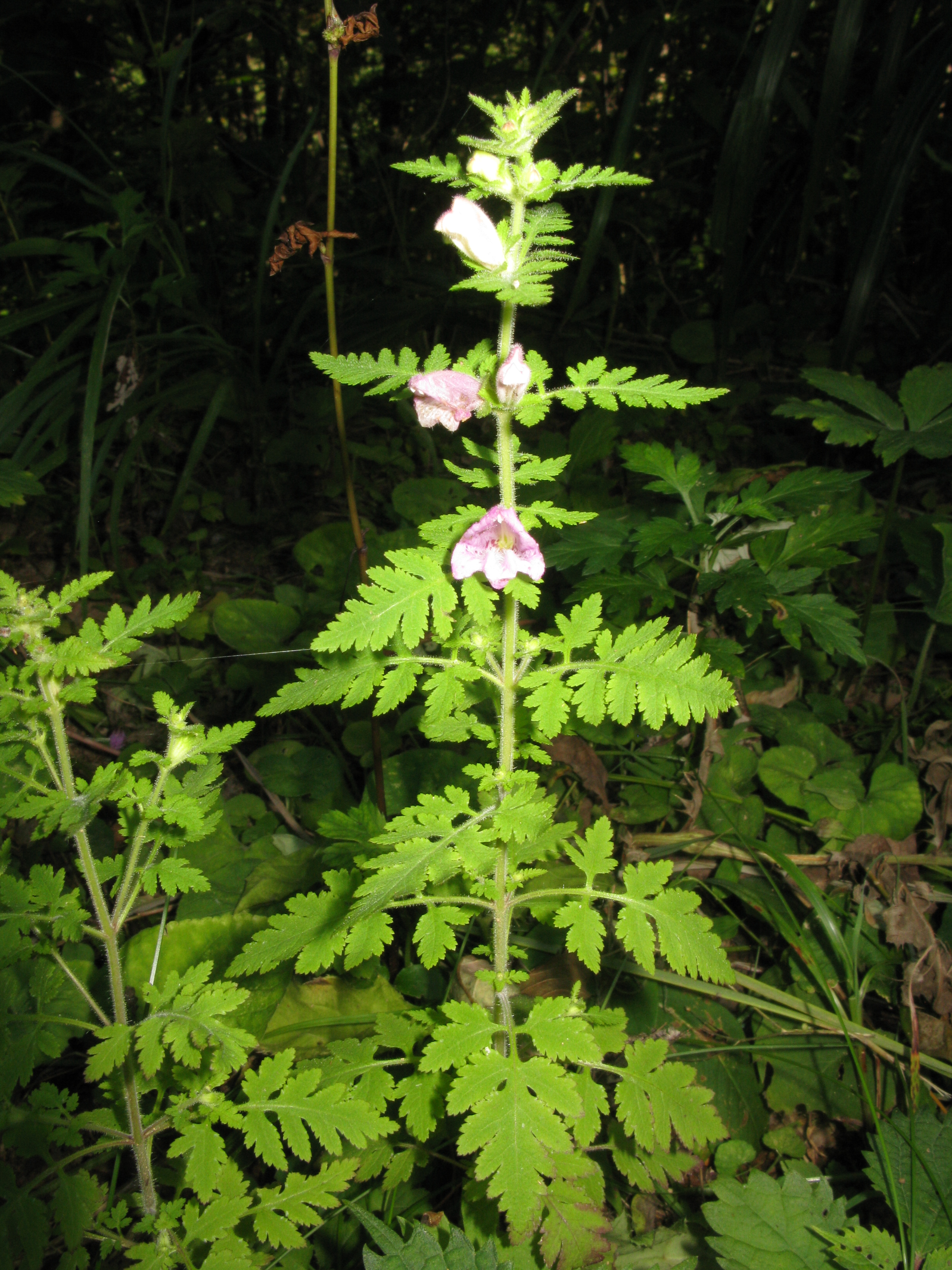

Scientific classification
- Kingdom: Plantae
- Clade: Tracheophytes
- Clade: Angiosperms
- Clade: Eudicots
- Clade: Asterids
- Order: Lamiales
- Family: Orobanchaceae
- Genus: Phtheirospermum; Bunge ex Fisch. & C.A.Mey.
- Species: P. japonicum

Binomial name
- Phtheirospermum japonicum (Thunb.) Kanitz

= Phtheirospermum =

Genus of plants

Phtheirospermum is a monotypic genus of flowering plants belonging to the family Orobanchaceae. The only species is Phtheirospermum japonicum, which is hemiparasitic and often used as a model species to study plant parasitism. P. japonicum has a broad host range and its native range is Russian Far East to Korea.
