= Odontitella =

Scientific classification
- Kingdom: Plantae
- Clade: Tracheophytes
- Clade: Angiosperms
- Clade: Eudicots
- Clade: Asterids
- Order: Lamiales
- Family: Orobanchaceae
- Genus: Odontitella; Rothm.
- Species: O. virgata

Binomial name
- Odontitella virgata (Link) Rothm.

Genus of plants

Odontitella is a monotypic genus of flowering plants belonging to the family Orobanchaceae. The only species is Odontitella virgata.

Its native range is Iberian Peninsula.
