= Nothobartsia =

Scientific classification
- Kingdom: Plantae
- Clade: Tracheophytes
- Clade: Angiosperms
- Clade: Eudicots
- Clade: Asterids
- Order: Lamiales
- Family: Orobanchaceae
- Genus: Nothobartsia; Bolliger & Molau

Genus of plants

Nothobartsia is a genus of flowering plants belonging to the family Orobanchaceae.

Its native range is the Western Mediterranean.

== Species ==
Species:

- Nothobartsia asperrima (Link) Benedí & Herrero
- Nothobartsia spicata (Ramond) Bolliger & Molau
