= Micrargeriella =

Scientific classification
- Kingdom: Plantae
- Clade: Tracheophytes
- Clade: Angiosperms
- Clade: Eudicots
- Clade: Asterids
- Order: Lamiales
- Family: Orobanchaceae
- Genus: Micrargeriella; R.E.Fr.
- Species: M. aphylla

Binomial name
- Micrargeriella aphylla R.E.Fr.

Genus of plants

Micrargeriella is a monotypic genus of flowering plants belonging to the family Orobanchaceae. The only species is Micrargeriella aphylla.

Its native range is Southern Tropical Africa.
