= Pseudostriga =

Scientific classification
- Kingdom: Plantae
- Clade: Tracheophytes
- Clade: Angiosperms
- Clade: Eudicots
- Clade: Asterids
- Order: Lamiales
- Family: Orobanchaceae
- Genus: Pseudostriga; Bonati
- Species: P. cambodiana

Binomial name
- Pseudostriga cambodiana Bonati

Genus of plants

Pseudostriga is a monotypic genus of flowering plants belonging to the family Orobanchaceae. The only species is Pseudostriga cambodiana.

Its native range is Indo-China.
