= Monochasma =

Scientific classification
- Kingdom: Plantae
- Clade: Tracheophytes
- Clade: Angiosperms
- Clade: Eudicots
- Clade: Asterids
- Order: Lamiales
- Family: Orobanchaceae
- Genus: Monochasma; Maxim. ex Franch. & Sav.

Genus of plants

Monochasma is a genus of flowering plants belonging to the family Orobanchaceae.

Its native range is Southern China and Japan.

== Species ==
Species:

- Monochasma savatieri Franch. ex Maxim.
- Monochasma sheareri (S.Moore) Maxim. ex Franch. & Sav.
