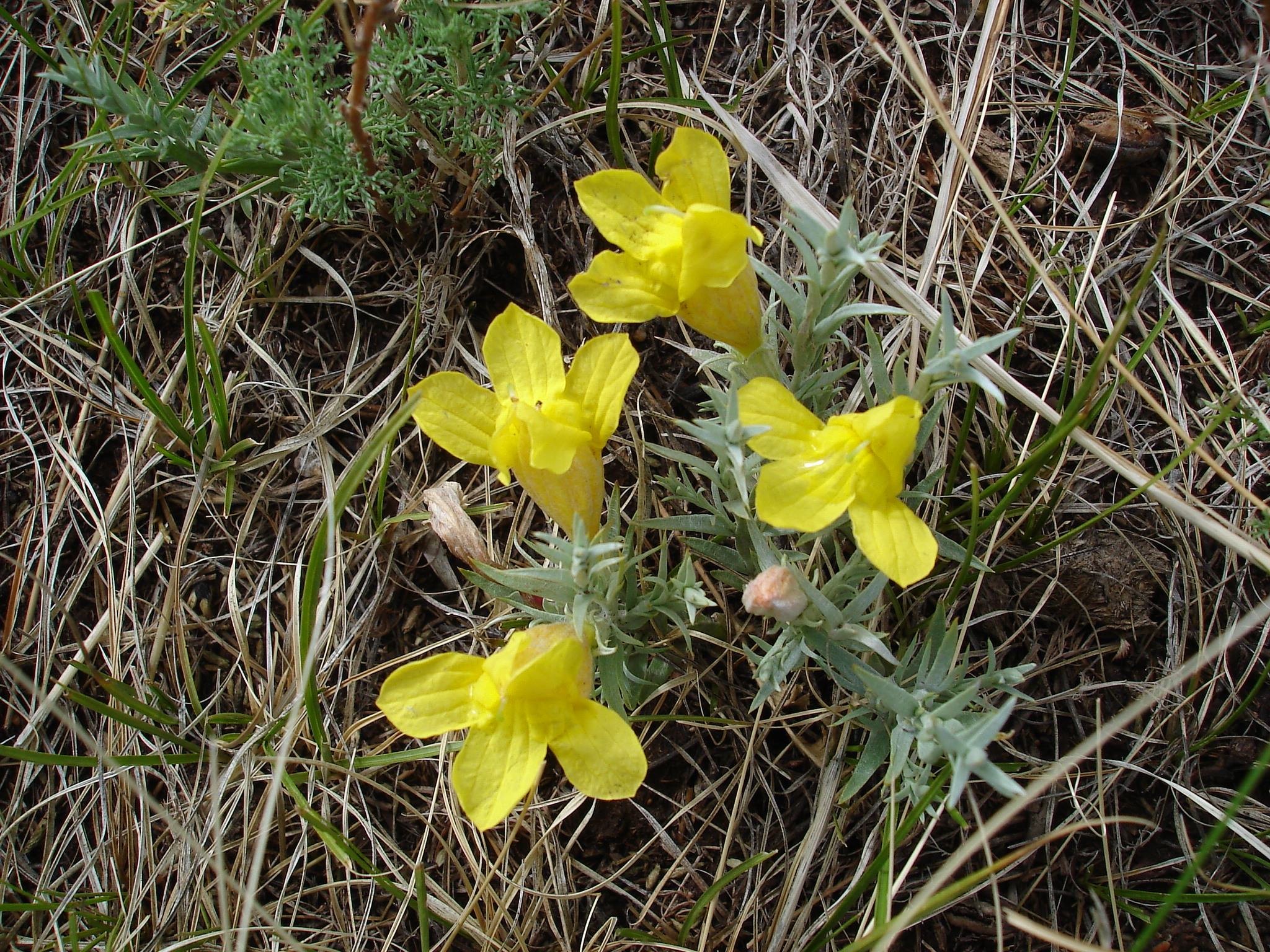
- Cymbaria daurica

Scientific classification
- Kingdom: Plantae
- Clade: Embryophytes
- Clade: Tracheophytes
- Clade: Spermatophytes
- Clade: Angiosperms
- Clade: Eudicots
- Clade: Asterids
- Order: Lamiales
- Family: Orobanchaceae
- Tribe: Cymbarieae
- Genus: Cymbaria; L.

Species
- See text

Synonyms
- Cimbaria Hill; Cymbochasma Endl.

= Cymbaria =

Genus of flowering plants

Cymbaria is a genus of flowering plants in the broomrape family Orobanchaceae, native to Ukraine, Russia, Kazakhstan, Siberia, the Altai, Mongolia, northern China and Manchuria. They are hemiparasites of other plants, obtaining nutrients through haustoria which attach to the roots of the hosts, and doing some photosynthesis on their own.

== Species ==
The following species are recognised in the genus Cymbaria:

- Cymbaria borysthenica Pall. ex Schltdl.
- Cymbaria chaneti Gand.
- Cymbaria daurica L.
- Cymbaria mongolica Maxim.
