= Pterygiella =

Scientific classification
- Kingdom: Plantae
- Clade: Tracheophytes
- Clade: Angiosperms
- Clade: Eudicots
- Clade: Asterids
- Order: Lamiales
- Family: Orobanchaceae
- Genus: Pterygiella; Oliv.

Genus of plants

Pterygiella is a genus of flowering plants belonging to the family Orobanchaceae.

Its native range is Tibet to Southern Central China.

Species:

- Pterygiella bartschioides Hand.-Mazz.
- Pterygiella cylindrica P.C.Tsoong
- Pterygiella duclouxii Franch.
- Pterygiella luzhijiangensis Huan C.Wang
- Pterygiella muliensis (C.Y.Wu & D.D.Tao) Pinto-Carr., E.Rico & M.M.Mart.Ort.
- Pterygiella nigrescens Oliv.
- Pterygiella parishii (Hook.f.) Pinto-Carr., E.Rico & M.M.Mart.Ort.
- Pterygiella suffruticosa D.Y.Hong
- Pterygiella tenuisecta (Bureau & Franch.) Pinto-Carr., E.Rico & M.M.Mart.Ort.
- Pterygiella trichosepala Huan C.Wang & M.Y.Yin
