= Anisantherina =

Scientific classification
- Kingdom: Plantae
- Clade: Tracheophytes
- Clade: Angiosperms
- Clade: Eudicots
- Clade: Asterids
- Order: Lamiales
- Family: Orobanchaceae
- Genus: Anisantherina; Pennell

Genus of flowering plants

Anisantherina is a genus of flowering plants belonging to the family Orobanchaceae.

Its native range is Southeastern Mexico to Tropical America.

Species:

- Anisantherina hispidula (Mart.) Pennell
