= Sopubia =

Scientific classification
- Kingdom: Plantae
- Clade: Tracheophytes
- Clade: Angiosperms
- Clade: Eudicots
- Clade: Asterids
- Order: Lamiales
- Family: Orobanchaceae
- Genus: Sopubia; Buch.-Ham. ex D.Don

Genus of plants

Sopubia is a genus of flowering plants belonging to the family Orobanchaceae.

Its native range is Tropical and Southern Africa, Madagascar, Southern China to Tropical Asia.

== Species ==
Species:

- Sopubia aemula S.Moore
- Sopubia argentea Hiern
- Sopubia cana Harv.
- Sopubia comosa (Bonati) T.Yamaz.
- Sopubia conferta S.Moore
- Sopubia decumbens Hiern
- Sopubia duvigneaudiana H.-P.Hofm. & Eb.Fisch.
- Sopubia elatior Pilg.
- Sopubia eminii Engl.
- Sopubia gracilis H.-P.Hofm. & Eb.Fisch.
- Sopubia graminicola Exell
- Sopubia kacondensis S.Moore
- Sopubia karaguensis Oliv.
- Sopubia lanata Engl.
- Sopubia lasiocarpa P.C.Tsoong
- Sopubia latifolia Engl.
- Sopubia lemuriana H.-P.Hofm. & Eb.Fisch.
- Sopubia madagascariensis (Benth.) Baker
- Sopubia mannii Skan
- Sopubia matsumurae (T.Yamaz.) C.Y.Wu
- Sopubia menglianensis Y.Y.Qian
- Sopubia myomboensis P.A.Duvign. & Van Bockstal
- Sopubia parviflora Engl.
- Sopubia patris Cuccuini
- Sopubia ramosa (Hochst.) Hochst.
- Sopubia simplex (Hochst.) Hochst.
- Sopubia stricta (Benth.) G.Don
- Sopubia trifida Buch.-Ham. ex D.Don
- Sopubia triphylla Baker
- Sopubia ugandensis S.Moore
