= Brandisia =

Scientific classification
- Kingdom: Plantae
- Clade: Tracheophytes
- Clade: Angiosperms
- Clade: Eudicots
- Clade: Asterids
- Order: Lamiales
- Family: Orobanchaceae
- Genus: Brandisia; Hook.f. & Thomson

Genus of flowering plants in the broomrape family

Brandisia is a genus of flowering plants in the family Orobanchaceae.

== Species ==
- Brandisia annamitica Bonati
- Brandisia cauliflora P.C.Tsoong & L.T.Lu
- Brandisia chevalieri Bonati
- Brandisia discolor Hook.f. & Thomson
- Brandisia glabrescens Rehder
- Brandisia hancei Hook.f.
- Brandisia kwangsiensis H.L.Li
- Brandisia racemosa Hemsl.
- Brandisia rosea W.W.Sm.
- Brandisia scandens Bonati
- Brandisia swinglei Merr.

Species brought into synonymy

- Brandisia pubiflora Benth.: synonym of Alternanthera pubiflora (Benth.) Kuntze
