= Rhaphispermum =

Scientific classification
- Kingdom: Plantae
- Clade: Tracheophytes
- Clade: Angiosperms
- Clade: Eudicots
- Clade: Asterids
- Order: Lamiales
- Family: Orobanchaceae
- Genus: Rhaphispermum; Benth.
- Species: R. gerardioides

Binomial name
- Rhaphispermum gerardioides Benth.

Genus of plants

Rhaphispermum is a monotypic genus of flowering plants belonging to the family Orobanchaceae. The only species is Rhaphispermum gerardioides.

Its native range is Madagascar.
