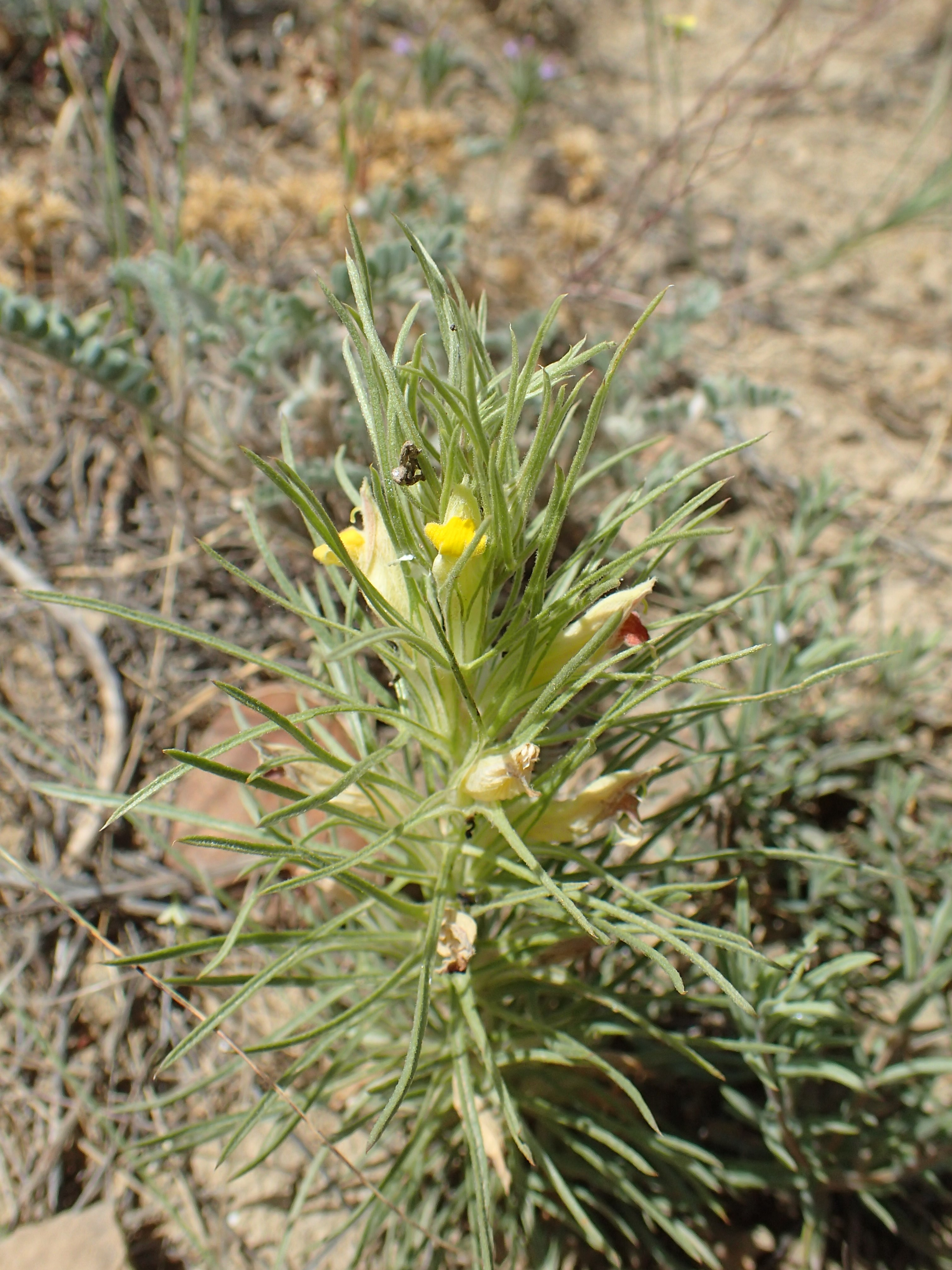

Scientific classification
- Kingdom: Plantae
- Clade: Tracheophytes
- Clade: Angiosperms
- Clade: Eudicots
- Clade: Asterids
- Order: Lamiales
- Family: Orobanchaceae
- Tribe: Cymbarieae
- Genus: Bungea; C.A.Mey.

= Bungea =

Genus of flowering plants

Bungea is a genus of plants, belonging to the family Orobanchaceae.

The genus is named after Alexander von Bunge.
