= Seymeriopsis =

Scientific classification
- Kingdom: Plantae
- Clade: Tracheophytes
- Clade: Angiosperms
- Clade: Eudicots
- Clade: Asterids
- Order: Lamiales
- Family: Orobanchaceae
- Genus: Seymeriopsis; Tzvelev (1987)
- Species: S. bissei

Binomial name
- Seymeriopsis bissei Tzvelev (1987)

Genus of flowering plants

Seymeriopsis bissei is a species of flowering plant in the family Orobanchaceae. It is the sole species in genus Seymeriopsis. It is endemic to Cuba.
