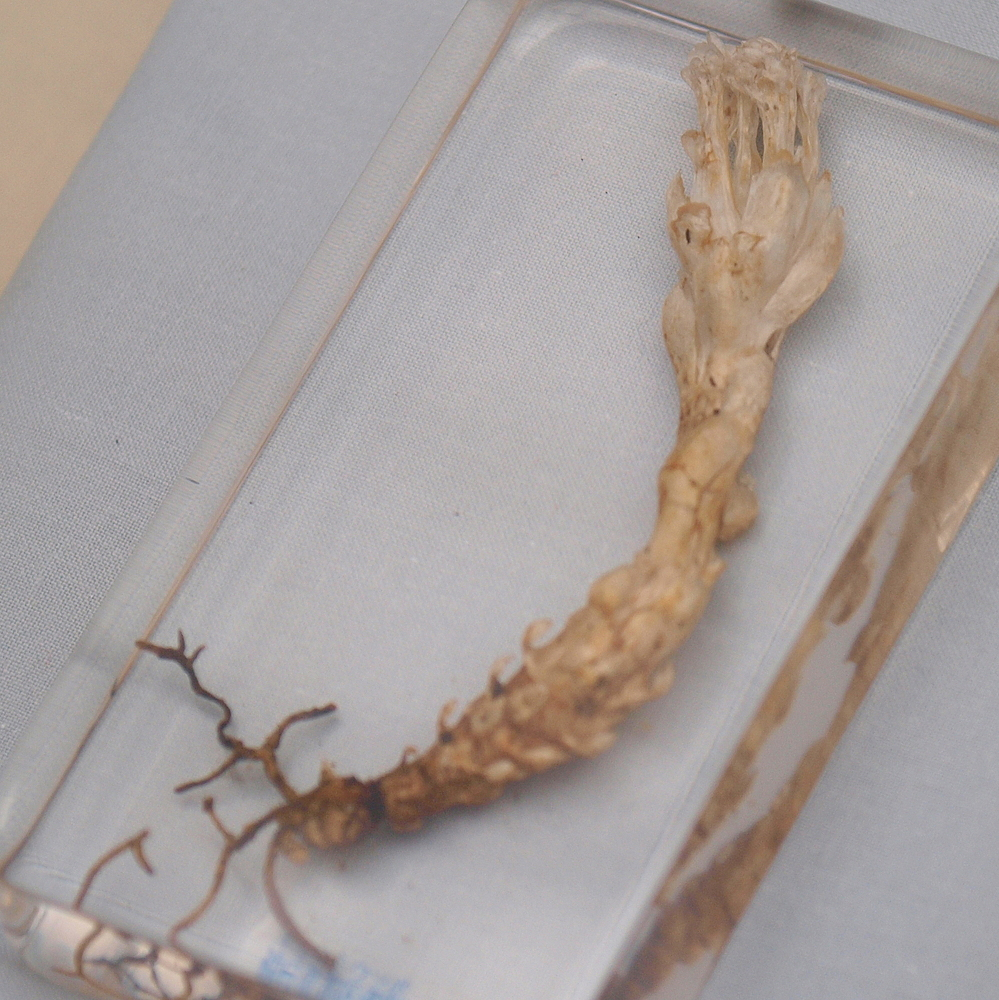
- Phacellanthus tubiflorus

Scientific classification
- Kingdom: Plantae
- Clade: Tracheophytes
- Clade: Angiosperms
- Clade: Eudicots
- Clade: Asterids
- Order: Lamiales
- Family: Orobanchaceae
- Genus: Phacellanthus; Siebold & Zucc.
- Species: P. tubiflorus

Binomial name
- Phacellanthus tubiflorus Siebold & Zucc.

= Phacellanthus =

Genus of plants

Phacellanthus is a monotypic genus of flowering plants belonging to the family Orobanchaceae. The only species is Phacellanthus tubiflorus.

Its native range is China to Russian Far East and Japan.
