= Cycniopsis =

Scientific classification
- Kingdom: Plantae
- Clade: Tracheophytes
- Clade: Angiosperms
- Clade: Eudicots
- Clade: Asterids
- Order: Lamiales
- Family: Orobanchaceae
- Genus: Cycniopsis; Engl.

Genus of flowering plants

Cycniopsis is a genus of flowering plants belonging to the family Orobanchaceae.

Its native range is Northeastern and Eastern Tropical Africa, Arabian Peninsula.

Species:

- Cycniopsis humifusa (Forssk.) Engl.
- Cycniopsis humilis (Hochst. ex Benth.) Backlund, Hunde & E.Langstrom
