= Mannagettaea =

Scientific classification
- Kingdom: Plantae
- Clade: Tracheophytes
- Clade: Angiosperms
- Clade: Eudicots
- Clade: Asterids
- Order: Lamiales
- Family: Orobanchaceae
- Genus: Mannagettaea; Harry Sm.

Genus of flowering plant

Mannagettaea is a genus of flowering plants belonging to the family Orobanchaceae. It is a holoparasitic plant.

It is native to southern Siberia (within Irkutsk Oblast and Tuva) and also northern China (in Qinghai).

The genus name of Mannagettaea is in honour of Günther Beck von Mannagetta und Lerchenau (1856–1931), a prominent Austrian botanist. It was first described and published in Acta Horti Gothob. Vol.8 on page 135 in 1933.

Known species, according to Kew;

- Mannagettaea hummelii Harry Sm.
- Mannagettaea labiata Harry Sm.
