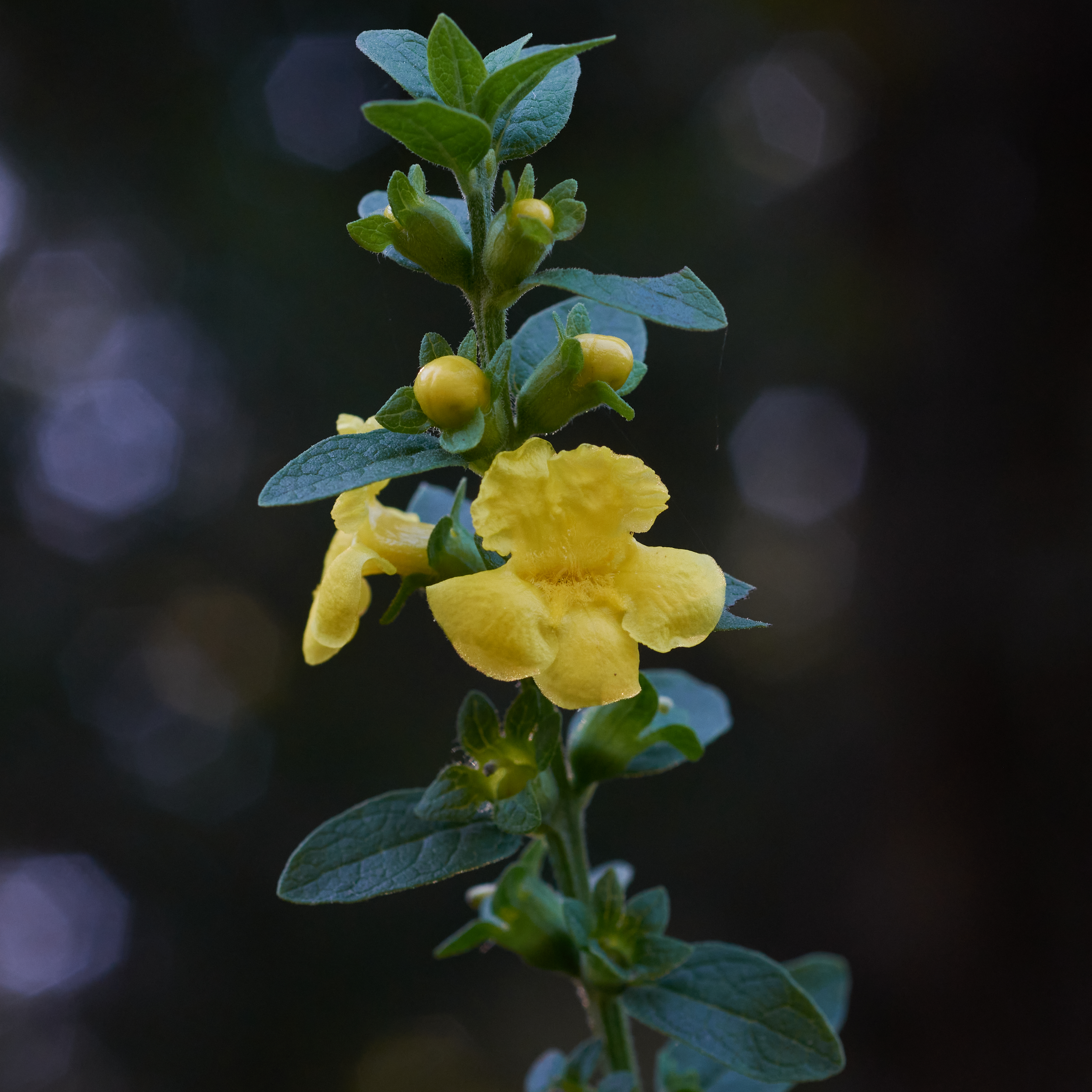

Scientific classification
- Kingdom: Plantae
- Clade: Tracheophytes
- Clade: Angiosperms
- Clade: Eudicots
- Clade: Asterids
- Order: Lamiales
- Family: Orobanchaceae
- Tribe: Pedicularideae
- Genus: Dasistoma; Raf.
- Species: D. macrophylla

Binomial name
- Dasistoma macrophylla (Nutt.) Raf.

= Dasistoma =

Genus of flowering plants

Dasistoma macrophylla, commonly known as mullein foxglove, is a species of flowering plant in the broomrape family. It is monotypic, with no other species in the genus Dasistoma.

Dasistoma is native to the eastern United States, where its range is almost exclusively west of the Appalachian Mountains. Its natural habitat is in dry or dry-mesic woodlands and bluffs, typically on calcareous substrates. It is a moderately conservative species, not being found in highly ecologically disturbed habitats.

Dasistoma is a tall hemiparasitic forb growing to around six feet high. It is short lived, typically an annual or biennial although occasionally perennial. It produces tubular yellow flowers in the summer.

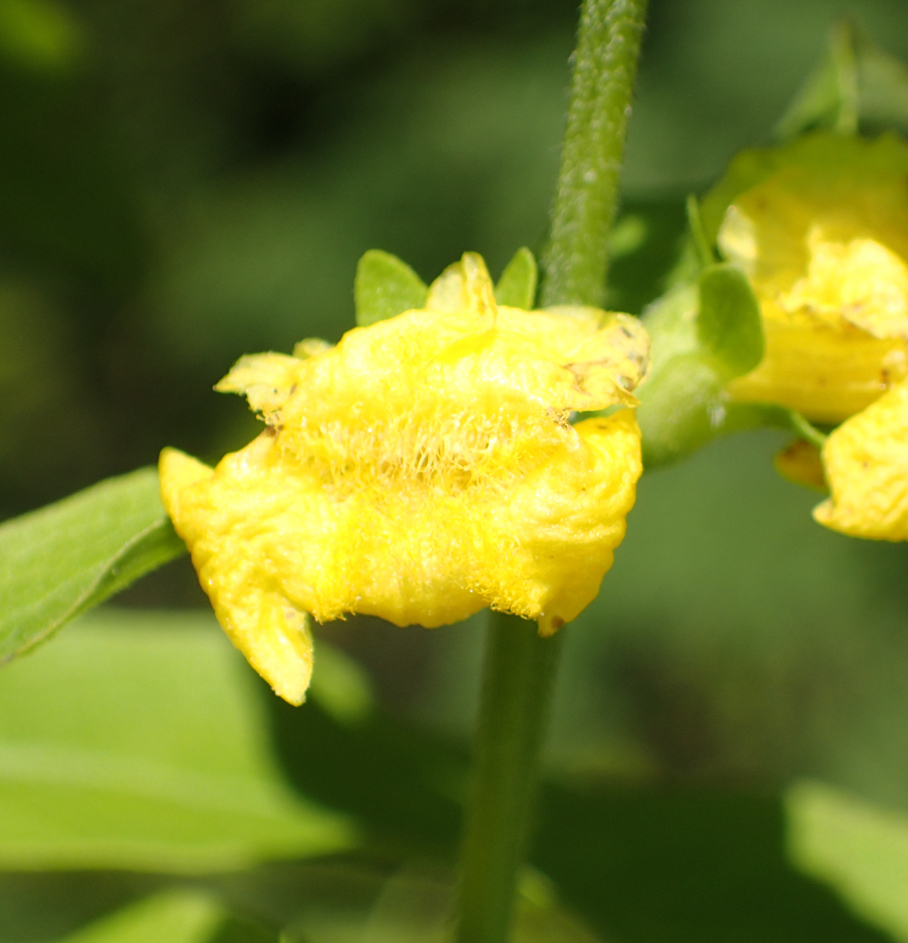
The genus name Dasistoma derives from Greek for "woolly mouthed", referring to the hairy flower opening

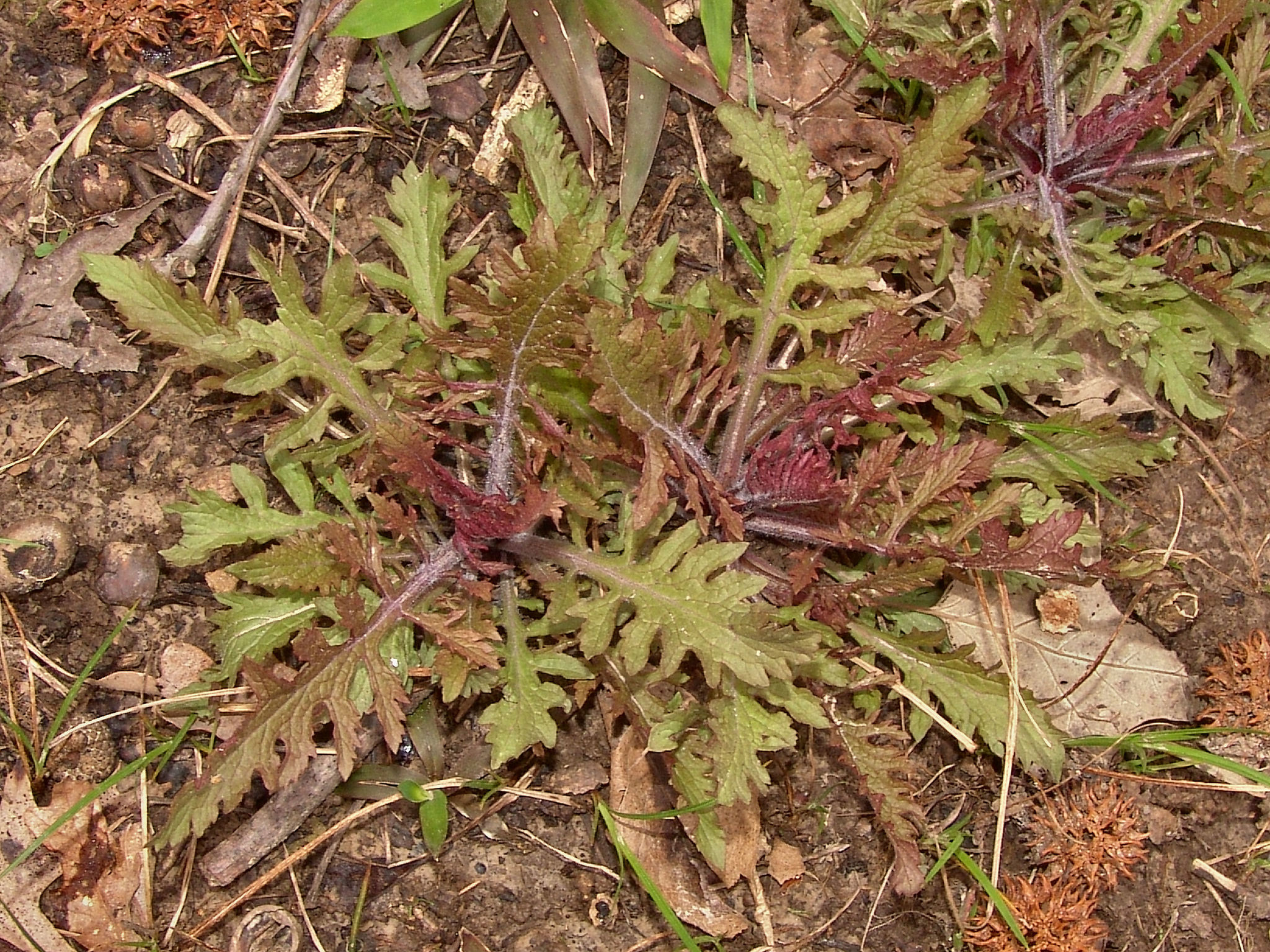
Basal leaves in early spring
