= Melasma (plant) =

Scientific classification
- Kingdom: Plantae
- Clade: Tracheophytes
- Clade: Angiosperms
- Clade: Eudicots
- Clade: Asterids
- Order: Lamiales
- Family: Orobanchaceae
- Genus: Melasma; P.J.Bergius (1767)

Species
- 7; see text

Synonyms
- Gastromeria D.Don (1830); Lyncea Schltdl. & Cham. (1830); Nigrina L. (1767); Velvitsia Hiern (1896); Eutheta Standl. (1931); Glossostylis Cham. & Schltdl. (1828)

Genus of flowering plants

Melasma scabrum

Melasma is a genus of flowering plants in the family Orobanchaceae. It includes seven species of herbaceous perennial plants native to the tropical Americas and sub-Saharan Africa, ranging from northeastern Mexico to northeastern Argentina and from the Democratic Republic of the Congo and Tanzania to South Africa.

== Species ==
Seven species are accepted.

- Melasma brevipedicellatum Lisowski & Mielcarek
- Melasma calycinum (Hiern) Hemsl.
- Melasma melampyroides (Rich.) Pennell ex Britton & P.Wilson
- Melasma physalodes (D.Don) Melch.
- Melasma rhinanthoides (Cham.) Benth.
- Melasma scabrum P.J.Bergius
- Melasma strictum (Benth.) Hassl.
