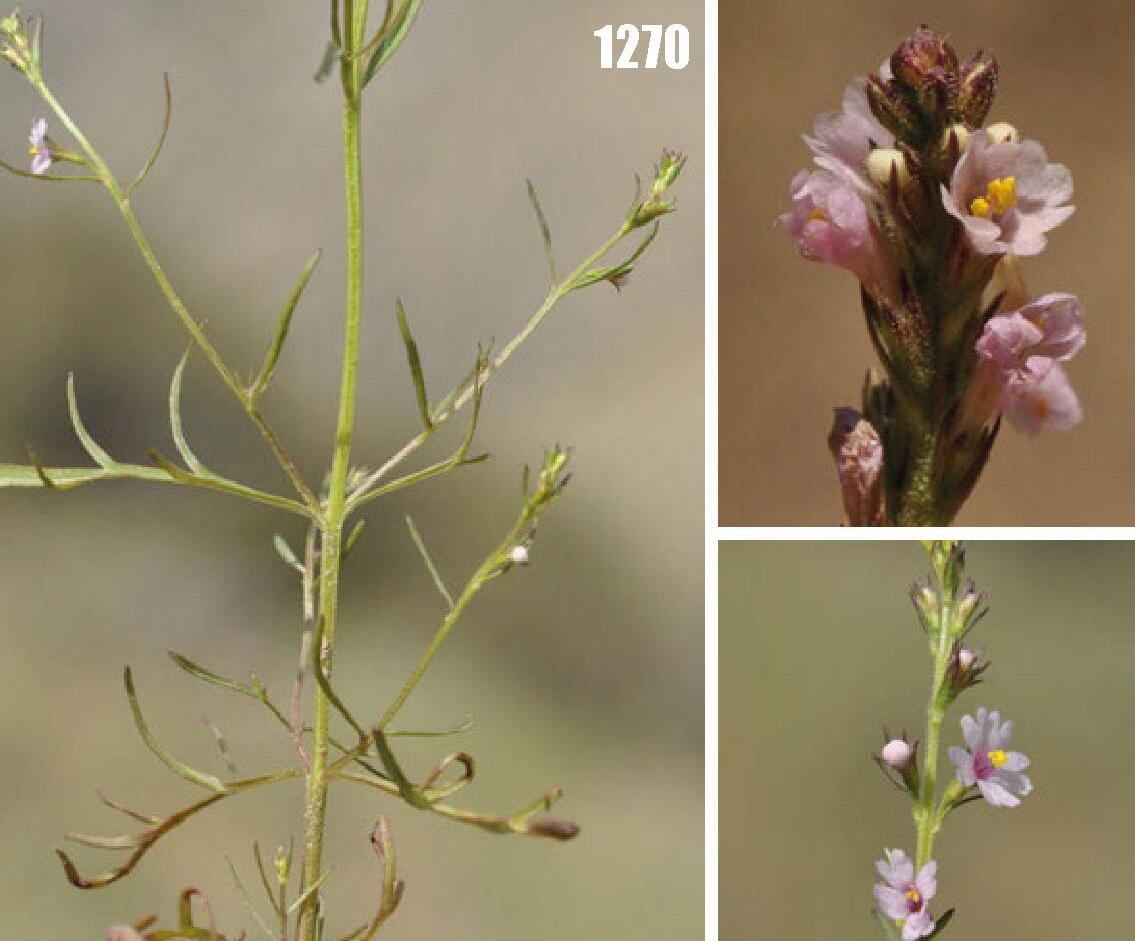

Scientific classification
- Kingdom: Plantae
- Clade: Tracheophytes
- Clade: Angiosperms
- Clade: Eudicots
- Clade: Asterids
- Order: Lamiales
- Family: Orobanchaceae
- Tribe: Pedicularideae
- Genus: Leptorhabdos; Schrenk
- Species: L. parviflora

Binomial name
- Leptorhabdos parviflora (Benth.) Benth.

Synonyms
- Genus Dargeria Decne.

= Leptorhabdos =

Genus of flowering plants in the broomrape family

Leptorhabdos is a monotypic genus of flowering plants, initially classified in Scrophulariaceae, and now within the broomrape family Orobanchaceae. It contains a single species, Leptorhabdos parviflora.

It thrives in steppes, rivers, and lake banks, from Caucasus and Iran to Central Asia and Himalayas.

== Etymology ==
The etymology of the genus name Leptorhabdos derives from the two Ancient Greek words λεπτός (leptós), meaning "fine-grained, tiny", and ῥάβδος (rhábdos), meaning "rod, wand, stick".

The synonym name Dargeria is a taxonomic anagram derived from the name of the confamilial genus Gerardia. The latter name is a taxonomic patronym honoring the English botanist John Gerard.
