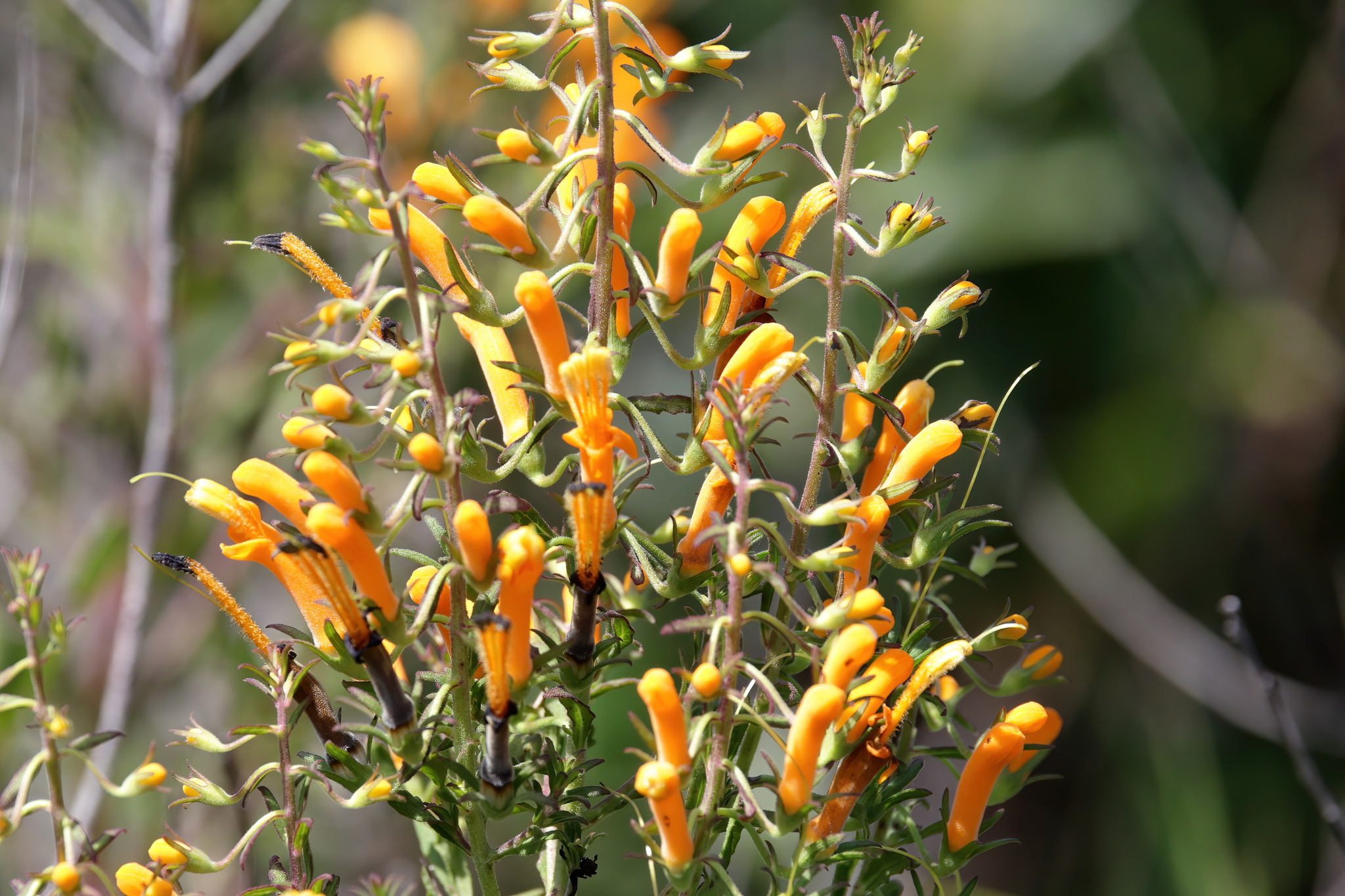
- Macranthera flammea photographed in Jackson County, Mississippi

Conservation status
- Vulnerable (NatureServe)

Scientific classification
- Kingdom: Plantae
- Clade: Tracheophytes
- Clade: Angiosperms
- Clade: Eudicots
- Clade: Asterids
- Order: Lamiales
- Family: Orobanchaceae
- Genus: Macranthera; Nutt. ex Benth.
- Species: M. flammea

Binomial name
- Macranthera flammea (W.Bartram) Pennell

Synonyms
- Gerardia flammea W.Bartram; Conradia fuchsioides Nutt.; Macranthera fuchsioides (Nutt.) Leconte & Benth.; Macranthera lecontei Torr.; Tomilix bracteata Raf.; Toxopus calycinus Raf.; Toxopus gymnanthes Raf.; Dasistoma tubulosa Bertol.; Macranthera fuchsioides var. lecontei (Torr.) Chapm.

= Macranthera =

Genus of plants

Macranthera is a monotypic plant genus in the family Orobanchaceae containing only the species Macranthera flammea, commonly known as the flameflower or hummingbird-flower. It is endemic to the Coastal Plain of the south-eastern United States.

== Distribution and habitat ==
Largely restricted to the Gulf Coastal Plain of the south-eastern United States, Macranthera flammea is native to the states of Alabama, Florida, Georgia, Louisiana, and Mississippi, ranging as far east as Bulloch County in eastern Georgia. It occurs in and around bogs, bayheads, creeks, ecotones, and seepage slopes from sea level up to 100 m (330 ft) above sea level.

== Ecology ==
Macranthera flammea flowers from July to October, and has adapted to flower prolifically following fires. The flowering period coincides with the arrival of ruby-throated hummingbirds (Archilochus colubris) in its range as part of their migration across the Gulf of Mexico.
