= Ghikaea =

Scientific classification
- Kingdom: Plantae
- Clade: Tracheophytes
- Clade: Angiosperms
- Clade: Eudicots
- Clade: Asterids
- Order: Lamiales
- Family: Orobanchaceae
- Genus: Ghikaea; Volkens & Schweinf.
- Species: G. speciosa

Binomial name
- Ghikaea speciosa (Rendle) Diels

Synonyms
- Ghikaea spectabilis Volkens & Schweinf.; Graderia speciosa Rendle

Genus of plants

Ghikaea is a monotypic genus of flowering plants belonging to the family Orobanchaceae. The only species is Ghikaea speciosa.

Its native range is Ethiopia, Somalia and northern Kenya.

The genus name of Ghikaea is in honour of Dimitrie Ghica-Comănești (1839–1923) a Romanian nobleman, explorer, famous hunter, adventurer and politician and also, Nicholae Dimitri Ghika (1875–1921), plant collector and was also Dimitrie's son. It was first described and published in (H.G.A.Engler & K.A.E.Prantl edited), Nat. Pflanzenfam., Nachtr. Vol.3 on page 314 in 1908.
