= Pseudosopubia =

Scientific classification
- Kingdom: Plantae
- Clade: Tracheophytes
- Clade: Angiosperms
- Clade: Eudicots
- Clade: Asterids
- Order: Lamiales
- Family: Orobanchaceae
- Genus: Pseudosopubia; Engl.

Genus of plants

Pseudosopubia is a genus of flowering plants belonging to the family Orobanchaceae.

Its native range is Northeastern and Eastern Tropical Africa.

Species:

- Pseudosopubia delamerei S.Moore
- Pseudosopubia hildebrandtii (Vatke) Engl.
- Pseudosopubia procumbens Hemsl.
