= Asepalum =

Scientific classification
- Kingdom: Plantae
- Clade: Tracheophytes
- Clade: Angiosperms
- Clade: Eudicots
- Clade: Asterids
- Order: Lamiales
- Family: Orobanchaceae
- Genus: Asepalum; Marais

Genus of flowering plants

Asepalum is a genus of flowering plants belonging to the family Orobanchaceae.

Its native range is Northeastern and Eastern Tropical Africa to Iraq.

Species:

- Asepalum eriantherum (Vatke) Marais
