= Micrargeria =

Scientific classification
- Kingdom: Plantae
- Clade: Tracheophytes
- Clade: Angiosperms
- Clade: Eudicots
- Clade: Asterids
- Order: Lamiales
- Family: Orobanchaceae
- Genus: Micrargeria; Benth.

Genus of plants

Micrargeria is a genus of flowering plants belonging to the family Orobanchaceae.

Its native range is Tropical Africa, Madagascar, and Myanmar.

== Species ==
Species:

- Micrargeria barteri Skan
- Micrargeria filiformis (Schumach. & Thonn.) Hutch. & Dalziel
- Micrargeria wightii Benth.
