= Pseudobartsia =

Scientific classification
- Kingdom: Plantae
- Clade: Tracheophytes
- Clade: Angiosperms
- Clade: Eudicots
- Clade: Asterids
- Order: Lamiales
- Family: Orobanchaceae
- Genus: Pseudobartsia; D.Y.Hong
- Species: P. glandulosa

Binomial name
- Pseudobartsia glandulosa (Benth.) W.B.Yu & D.Z.Li

Genus of plants

Pseudobartsia is a monotypic genus of flowering plants belonging to the family Orobanchaceae. The only species is Pseudobartsia glandulosa.

Its native range is Eastern Himalaya to Southern Central China.
