= Tetraspidium =

Scientific classification
- Kingdom: Plantae
- Clade: Tracheophytes
- Clade: Angiosperms
- Clade: Eudicots
- Clade: Asterids
- Order: Lamiales
- Family: Orobanchaceae
- Genus: Tetraspidium; Baker

Genus of flowering plants

Tetraspidium is a genus of flowering plants belonging to the family Orobanchaceae.

Its native range is Madagascar.

Species:

- Tetraspidium laxiflorum Baker
