= Sieversandreas =

Scientific classification
- Kingdom: Plantae
- Clade: Tracheophytes
- Clade: Angiosperms
- Clade: Eudicots
- Clade: Asterids
- Order: Lamiales
- Family: Orobanchaceae
- Genus: Sieversandreas; Eb.Fisch.
- Species: S. madagascarianus

Binomial name
- Sieversandreas madagascarianus Eb.Fisch.

Species of flowering plant

Sieversandreas is a monotypic genus of flowering plants belonging to the family Orobanchaceae. The only species is Sieversandreas madagascarianus.

It is native to Madagascar.

The genus name of Sieversandreas is in honour of Andreas Sievers (1931–2009), German botanist, director of the university botanical garden in Bonn, professor of cell biology. The Latin specific epithet of madagascarianus means coming from Madagascar, where the plant was found. Both the genus and the species were first described and published in Bull. Mus. Natl. Hist. Nat., B, Adansonia Vol.18 on pages 213-214 in 1996.
