= Triaenophora =

Scientific classification
- Kingdom: Plantae
- Clade: Embryophytes
- Clade: Tracheophytes
- Clade: Spermatophytes
- Clade: Angiosperms
- Clade: Eudicots
- Clade: Asterids
- Order: Lamiales
- Family: Orobanchaceae
- Tribe: Rehmannieae
- Genus: Triaenophora; Soler.

Genus of flowering plants

Triaenophora is a genus of flowering plants native to Temperate Asia. Molecular phylogenetic studies place it in the tribe Rehmannieae of the family Orobanchaceae, although as of February 2025, Plants of the World Online continued to place it in Plantaginaceae.

== Taxonomy ==
The genus Triaenophora was first erected by Hans Solereder in 1909, based on a section of the genus Rehmannia which Joseph Dalton Hooker had called "Trianophora" in 1891. It was initially placed in the family Scrophulariaceae. When that family was shown by molecular phylogenetic studies not to be monophyletic, and so was split up, Triaenophora was placed in Plantaginaceae, a placement still used by Plants of the World Online as of February 2025. Subsequent studies have shown that Triaenophora forms a clade with Rehmannia, basal to parasitic genera in the family Orobanchaceae.

- Orobanchaceae
  - Rehmannieae
    - Triaenophora
    - Rehmannia
  - - Lindenbergia (Lindenbergieae)
    - remaining Orobanchaceae

The placement in the tribe Rehmannieae of the family Orobanchaceae was accepted by the Angiosperm Phylogeny Website, as of February 2025.

=== Species ===
As of March 2022, Plants of the World Online accepted four species:

- Triaenophora bucharica B.Fedtsch.
- Triaenophora integra (H.L.Li) Ivanina
- Triaenophora rupestris (Hemsl.) Soler.
- Triaenophora shennongjiaensis Xi.D.Li, Y.Y.Zan & J.Q.Li
