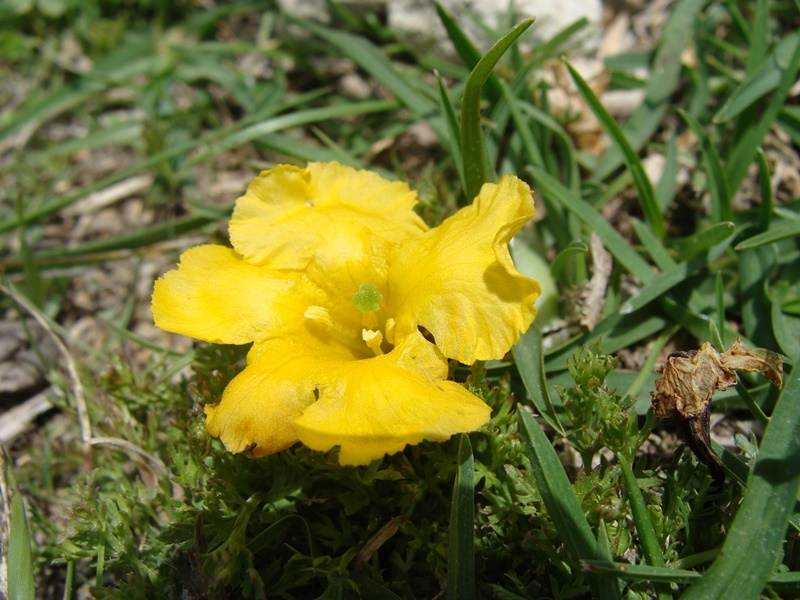
- Silviella prostrata

Scientific classification
- Kingdom: Plantae
- Clade: Tracheophytes
- Clade: Angiosperms
- Clade: Eudicots
- Clade: Asterids
- Order: Lamiales
- Family: Orobanchaceae
- Genus: Silviella; Pennell

Synonyms
- Silvia Benth.

= Silviella (plant) =

Genus of flowering plant

Silviella is a genus of flowering plants belonging to the family Orobanchaceae. Species of the genus are native to Mexico.

The genus name of Silviella is in honour of Baltasar da Silva Lisboa (1761–1840), a Brazilian lawyer and natural historian. It was first described in 1928.

== Known species ==
The following species are recognised in the genus Silviella:

- Silviella prostrata (Kunth) Pennell
- Silviella serpyllifolia (Kunth) Pennell
