= Nothochilus =

Scientific classification
- Kingdom: Plantae
- Clade: Tracheophytes
- Clade: Angiosperms
- Clade: Eudicots
- Clade: Asterids
- Order: Lamiales
- Family: Orobanchaceae
- Genus: Nothochilus; Radlk.
- Species: N. coccineus

Binomial name
- Nothochilus coccineus Radlk.

Genus of plants

Nothochilus is a monotypic genus of flowering plants belonging to the family Orobanchaceae. The only species is Nothochilus coccineus.

Its native range is Southeastern Brazil.
