= Aphyllon =

Scientific classification
- Kingdom: Plantae
- Clade: Embryophytes
- Clade: Tracheophytes
- Clade: Spermatophytes
- Clade: Angiosperms
- Clade: Eudicots
- Clade: Asterids
- Order: Lamiales
- Family: Orobanchaceae
- Tribe: Orobancheae
- Genus: Aphyllon; Mitch.

Sections
- Aphyllon; Nothaphyllon

Synonyms
- Orobanche sect. Gymnocaulis; Orobanche sect. Myzorrhiza

Genus of plants

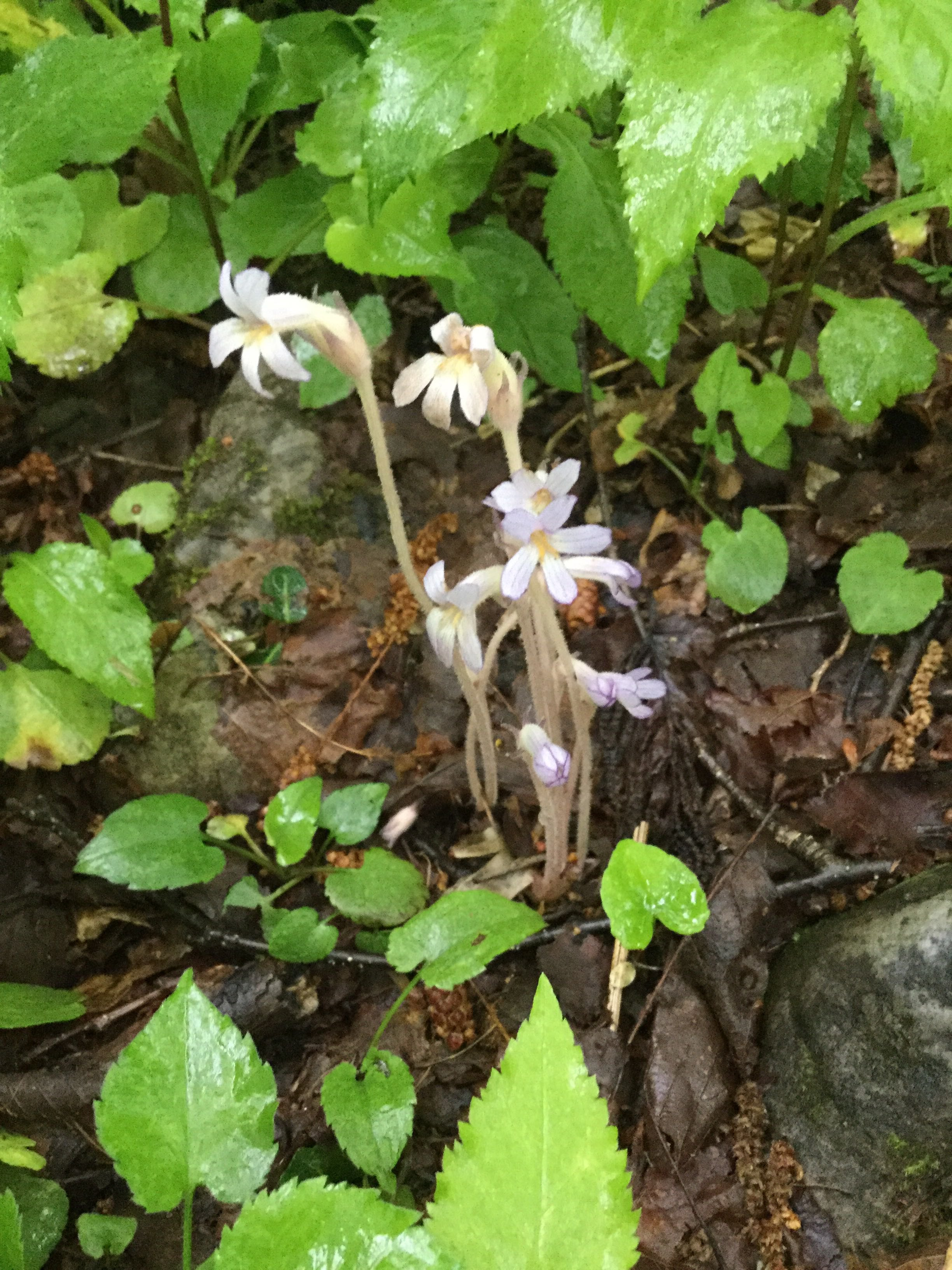
Aphyllon uniflorum, previously under Orobanche uniflora.

Aphyllon is a genus of flowering plants in the family Orobanchaceae. All Aphyllon species are obligate root parasites, taking nutrients from others rather than performing photosynthesis. They can be found in North and South America, with many species occurring in California, USA.

== Taxonomy ==
The species in Aphyllon were once considered a part of the genus Orobanche, but phylogenetic analyses have confirmed that Orobanche sensu lato is not a monophyletic group. The genus Aphyllon has since been resurrected, as originally described by John Mitchell in 1748 in "Dissertatio brevis de principiis botanicorum et zoologorum deque novo stabiliendo naturae rerum congruo cum appendice" (1748) or "A short dissertation on the principles of botanism and zoology, and on a new establishment of the nature of things, with an appropriate appendix".

=== Sections ===
The genus Aphyllon is composed of two sections; sect. Aphyllon and sect. Nothaphyllon. Species in sect. Aphyllon have pedicels much longer than the flower length, and the bracteoles subtending the calyx are absent. Species in sect. Nothaphyllon have pedicels that are shorter than or equal to the length of the flower and have 2 bracteoles subtending the calyx.

==== Aphyllon section Aphyllon (syn. Orobanche sect. Gymnocaulis) ====
- Aphyllon epigalium subsp. epigalium
- Aphyllon epigalium subsp. notocalifornicum
- Aphyllon fasciculatum
- Aphyllon franciscanum
- Aphyllon purpureum
- Aphyllon uniflorum

==== Aphyllon section Nothaphyllon (syns. Orobanche sect. Myzorrhiza, Orobanche sect. Nothaphyllon) ====
- Aphyllon arizonicum
- Aphyllon californicum subsp. californicum
- Aphyllon californicum subsp. condensum
- Aphyllon californicum subsp. feudgei
- Aphyllon californicum subsp. grande
- Aphyllon californicum subsp. grayanum
- Aphyllon californicum subsp. jepsonii
- Aphyllon castilloi
- Aphyllon chiapense
- Aphyllon chilense
- Aphyllon cooperi subsp. cooperi
- Aphyllon cooperi subsp. latilobum
- Aphyllon cooperi subsp. palmeri
- Aphyllon corymbosum
- Aphyllon corymbosum subsp. mutabile
- Aphyllon dugesii
- Aphyllon gypsophilum
- Aphyllon ludovicianum
- Aphyllon multiflorum
- Aphyllon parishii subsp. parishii
- Aphyllon parishii subsp. brachylobum
- Aphyllon pinorum
- Aphyllon riparium
- Aphyllon robbinsii
- Aphyllon spectabile
- Aphyllon tacnaense
- Aphyllon tarapacanum
- Aphyllon tuberosum
- Aphyllon validum subsp. validum
- Aphyllon validum subsp. howellii
- Aphyllon vallicolum
- Aphyllon weberbaueri
