= Pseudomelasma =

Scientific classification
- Kingdom: Plantae
- Clade: Tracheophytes
- Clade: Angiosperms
- Clade: Eudicots
- Clade: Asterids
- Order: Lamiales
- Family: Orobanchaceae
- Genus: Pseudomelasma; Eb.Fisch.
- Species: P. pedicularioides

Binomial name
- Pseudomelasma pedicularioides (Baker) Eb.Fisch.

Genus of plants

Pseudomelasma is a monotypic genus of flowering plants belonging to the family Orobanchaceae. The only species is Pseudomelasma pedicularioides.

Its native range is Madagascar.
