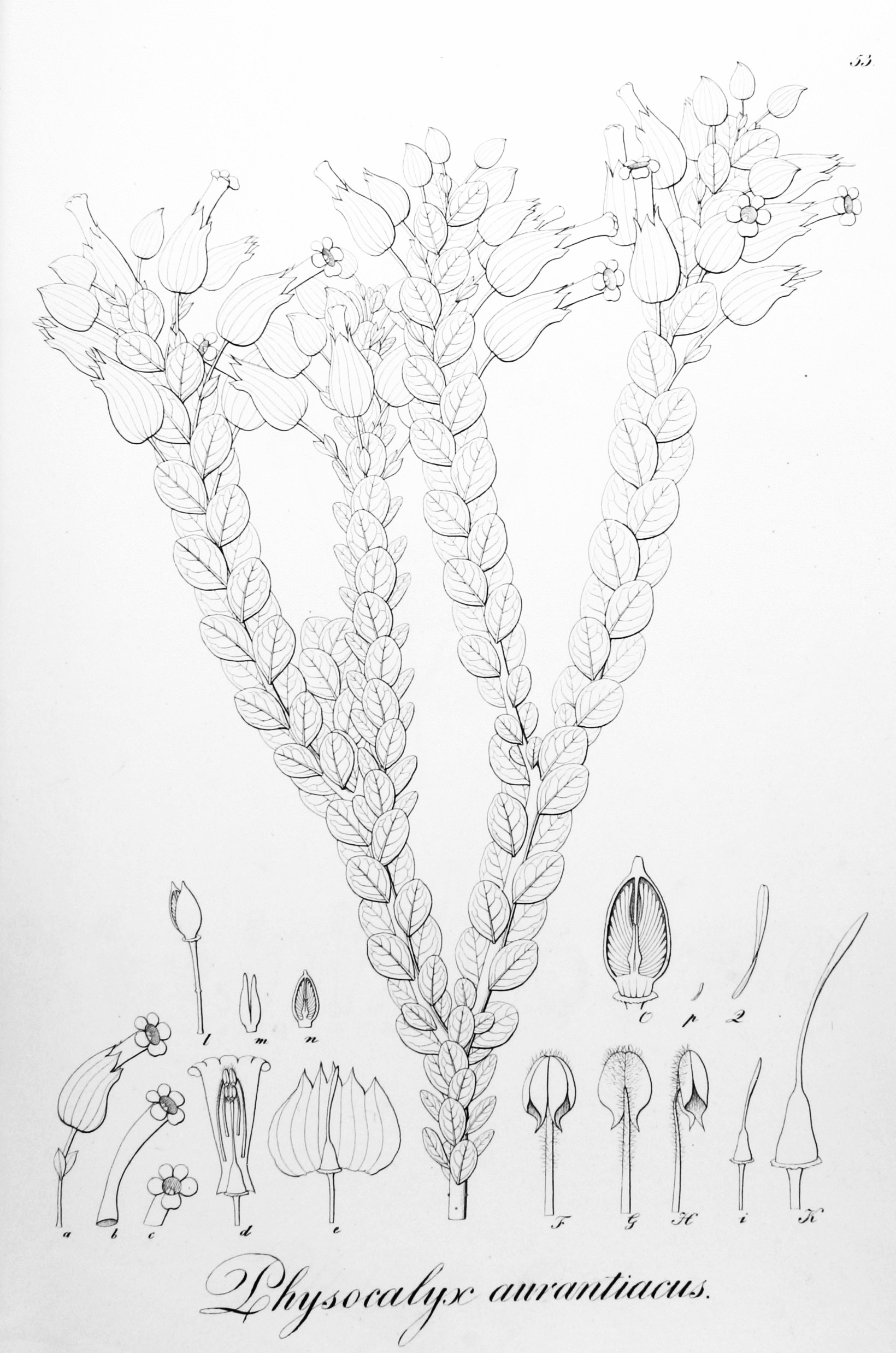
- Physocalyx aurantiacus

Scientific classification
- Kingdom: Plantae
- Clade: Tracheophytes
- Clade: Angiosperms
- Clade: Eudicots
- Clade: Asterids
- Order: Lamiales
- Family: Orobanchaceae
- Genus: Physocalyx; Pohl

= Physocalyx =

Genus of plants

Physocalyx is a genus of flowering plants belonging to the family Orobanchaceae.

Its native range is Eastern Brazil.

== Species ==
Species:

- Physocalyx aurantiacus Pohl
- Physocalyx major Mart.
- Physocalyx scaberrimus Philcox
