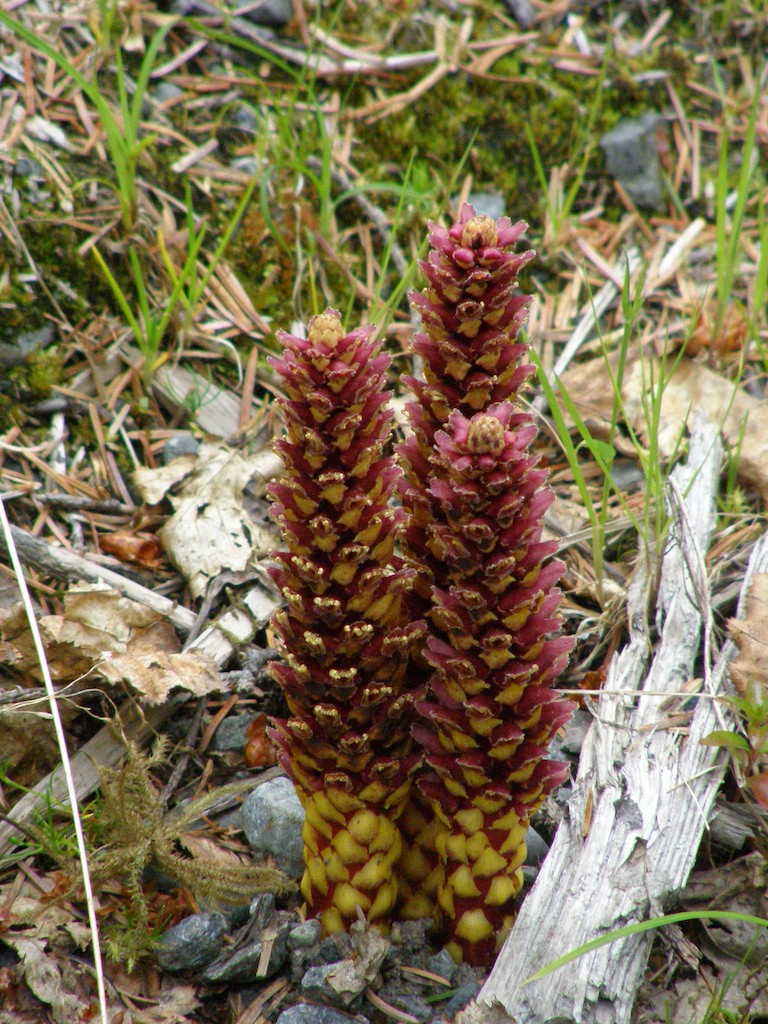
- Boschniakia rossica

Scientific classification
- Kingdom: Plantae
- Clade: Tracheophytes
- Clade: Angiosperms
- Clade: Eudicots
- Clade: Asterids
- Order: Lamiales
- Family: Orobanchaceae
- Tribe: Orobancheae
- Genus: Boschniakia; C. A. Mey. ex Bong.
- Species: B. rossica

Binomial name
- Boschniakia rossica (Cham. & Schltdl.) B.Fedtsch.

= Boschniakia =

Genus of flowering plants in the broomrape family

Boschniakia is a genus of parasitic plants in the family Orobanchaceae. They are known commonly as groundcones and they are native to western North America and extreme northeastern Asia. Some taxonomists consider Boschniakia to be three separate genera: Boschniakia, Kopsiopsis, and Xylanche. When the genus is split, only a single species remains: Boschniakia rossica, the northern groundcone.

Groundcones are holoparasitic, meaning they depend entirely on a host plant for nutrients and contain little or no chlorophyll. These plants often parasitize alders but they are found on many other plants. Groundcones often look at first glance like pine cones lying on the ground, especially when they are brown in color. They may also be shades of yellow, red, and purple. Each plant may be a few inches tall, and pine-cone-shaped or cylindrical. The plant above ground is almost entirely made up of its inflorescence, a tightly packed column of thick cup-shaped flowers. The groundcone produces haustoria which penetrate the roots of its host and provide it with water and nutrients.

The type species for Boschniakia is Boschniakia glabra, a species which is no longer considered valid. Instead, it is now included in Boschniakia rossica.
