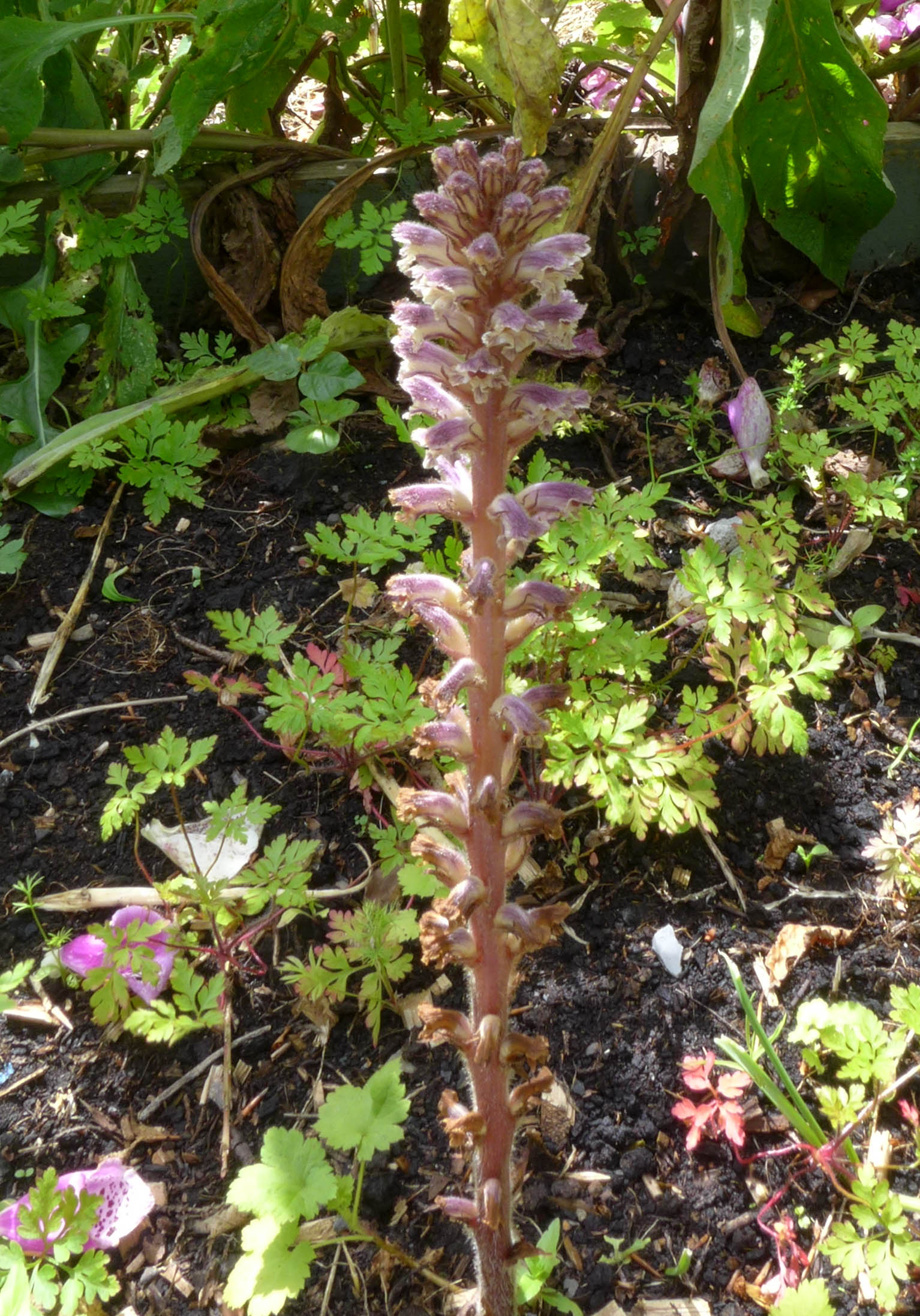
- Lesser broomrape (Orobanche minor)

Scientific classification
- Kingdom: Plantae
- Clade: Embryophytes
- Clade: Tracheophytes
- Clade: Angiosperms
- Clade: Eudicots
- Clade: Asterids
- Order: Lamiales
- Family: Orobanchaceae; Vent.

Tribes
- Rehmannieae; Lindenbergieae; Cymbarieae; Orobancheae; Brandisia; Pedicularideae; Rhinantheae; Buchnereae

Synonyms
- Cyclocheilaceae Marais (1981); Nesogenaceae Marais (1981)

= Orobanchaceae =

Family of flowering plants known as broomrapes

Orobanchaceae, the broomrapes, is a family of mostly parasitic plants of the order Lamiales, with about 90 genera and more than 2000 species. Many of these genera (e.g., Pedicularis, Rhinanthus, Striga) were formerly included in the family Scrophulariaceae sensu lato. With its new circumscription, Orobanchaceae forms a distinct, monophyletic family. From a phylogenetic perspective, it is defined as the largest crown clade containing Orobanche major and relatives, but neither Paulownia tomentosa nor Phryma leptostachya nor Mazus japonicus.

The Orobanchaceae are annual herbs or perennial herbs or shrubs, and most (all except Lindenbergia, Rehmannia and Triaenophora) are parasitic on the roots of other plants—either holoparasitic or hemiparasitic (fully or partly parasitic). The holoparasitic species lack chlorophyll and therefore cannot perform photosynthesis.

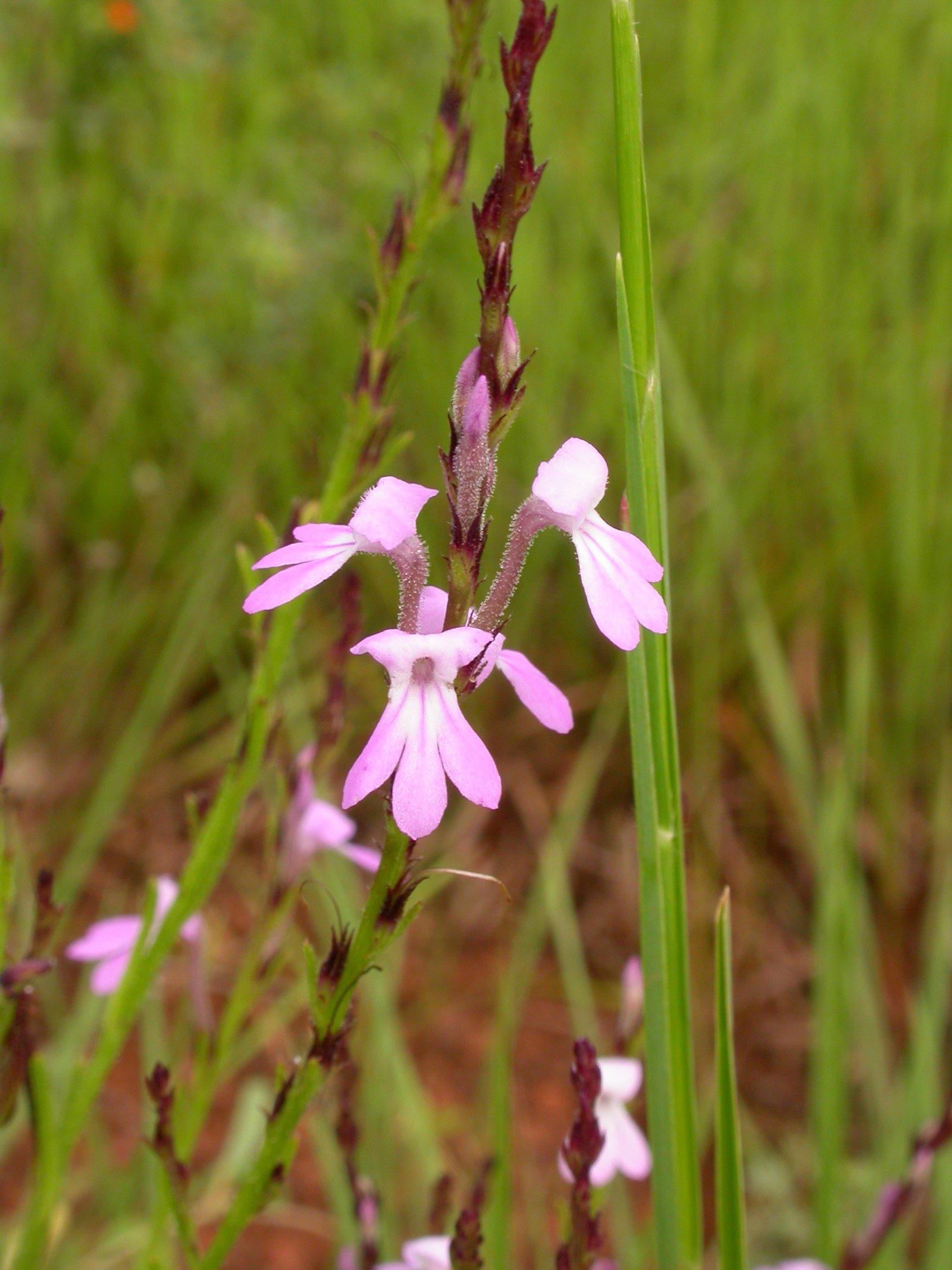
Striga bilabiata

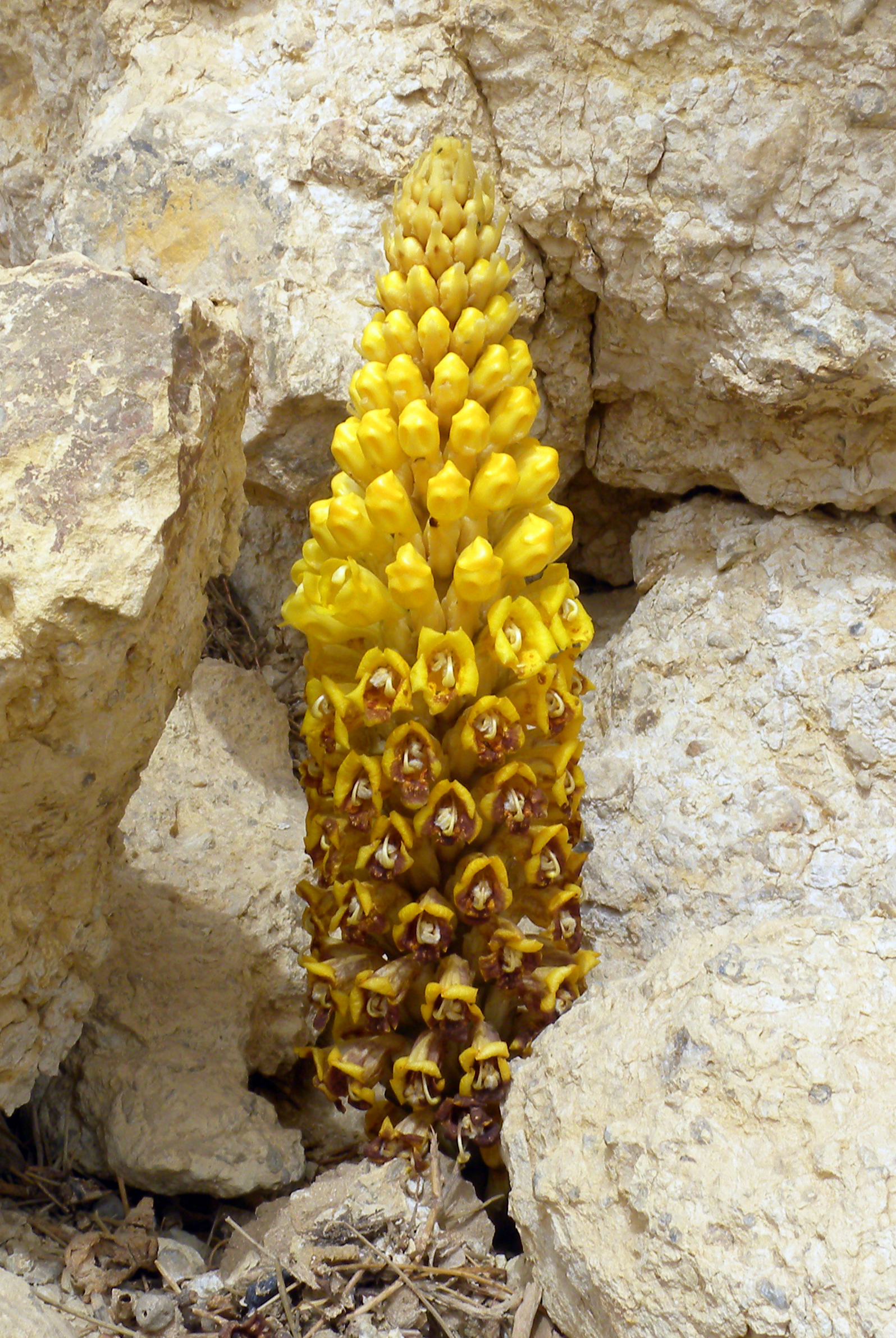
Cistanche tubulosa

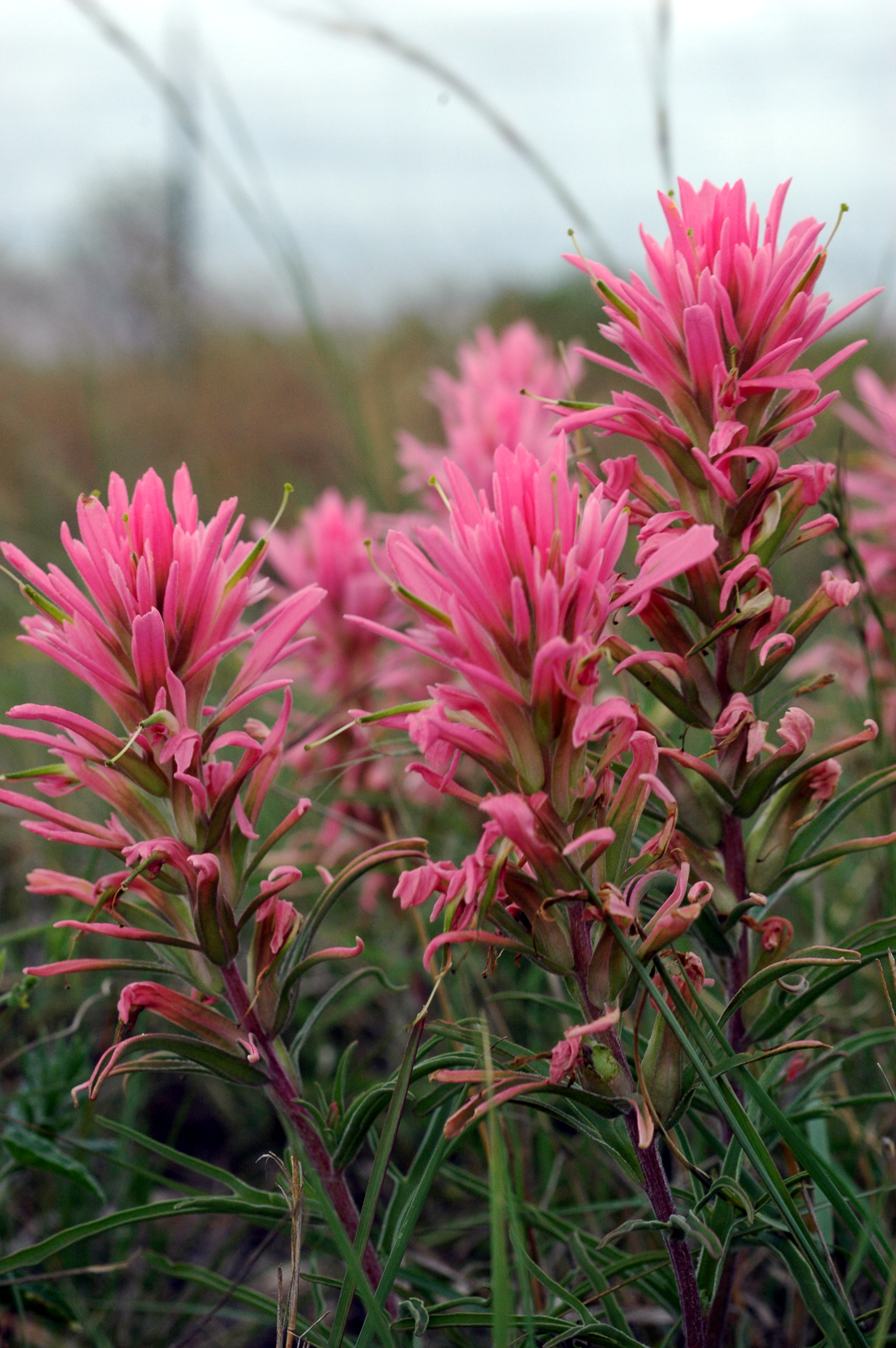
Castilleja purpurea

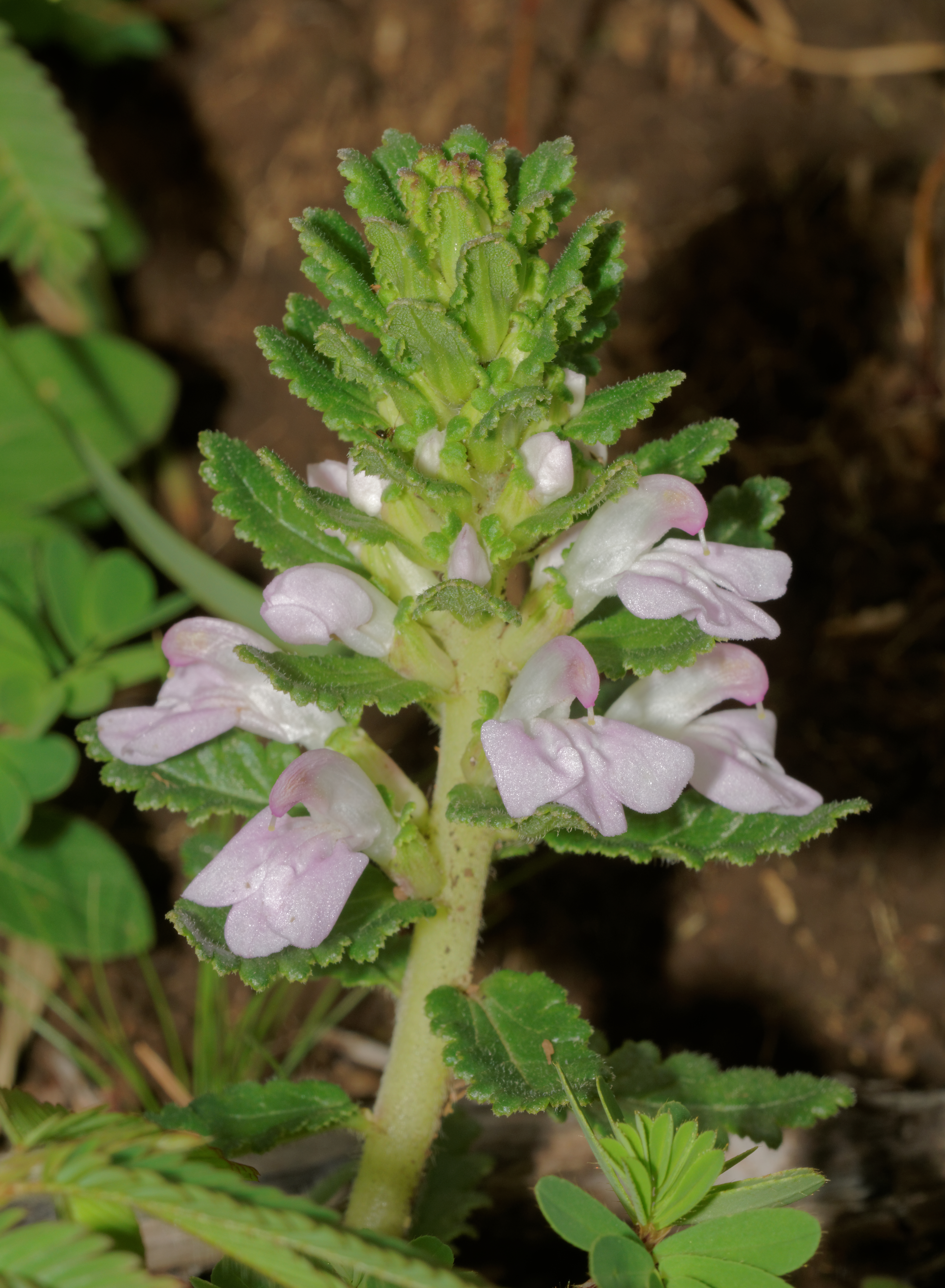
Pedicularis zeylanica

== Description ==
Orobanchaceae is the largest of the 20–28 dicot families that express parasitism. Apart from a few non-parasitic taxa, the family displays all types of plant parasitism: facultative parasite, obligate parasite, hemiparasites, and holoparasites.

=== Roots and stems ===
Parasitic plants are attached to their host by means of haustoria, which transfer nutrients from the host to the parasite. Only the hemiparasitic species possess an additional extensive root system referred to as the lateral or side haustoria. In most holoparasitic species there is a swollen mass of short, bulky roots or one big swollen haustorial organ, which may be simple or composite, commonly called the terminal or primary haustorium.

Plants are reduced to short vegetative stems, their alternate leaves are reduced to fleshy, tooth-like scales, and have multicellular hairs interspersed with glandular hairs.

The hemiparasitic species (transferred from Scrophulariaceae) with green leaves are capable of photosynthesis, and may be either facultative or obligate parasites.

=== Flowers ===
The hermaphroditic flowers are bilaterally symmetrical and grow either in racemes or spikes or singly at the apex of the slender stem. The tubular calyx is formed by 2–5 united sepals. There are five united, bilabiate petals forming the corolla and they may be yellowish, brownish, purplish, or white. The upper lip is two-lobed, the lower lip is three-lobed. There are two long and two short stamens on slender filaments, inserted below the middle, or at the base of the corolla tube, alternating with the lobes of the tube. A fifth stamen is either sterile or lacking completely. The anthers dehisce via longitudinal slits. The pistil is one-celled. The ovary is superior. The flowers are pollinated by insects or birds (e.g., hummingbirds, as in Castilleja).

=== Fruits ===
The fruit is a dehiscent, non-fleshy, 1-locular capsule with many very minute endospermic seeds. Fruits of Orobanchaceae are small and abundant and can produce between 10,000–1,000,000 seeds per plant. These are dispersed by the wind over long distances, which increases their chances of finding a new host.

== Taxonomy ==
The taxon was first described in 1799 by Étienne Pierre Ventenat as Orobanchoideae. The family name Orobanchaceae is a conserved name. Despite the similar morphological traits found in both Scrophulariaceae and Orobanchaceae, the latter is now considered a separate monophyletic taxon, on both molecular and mophological grounds. The 2016 APG IV system expanded Orobanchaceae to include genera previously placed in Scrophulariaceae, so that the family absorbed the former Lindenbergiaceae and Rehmanniaceae. These two former families may be treated as tribes. Molecular phylogenetic studies show that they are sisters to the other Orobanchaceae genera:

- Orobanchaceae
  - Rehmannieae
    - Triaenophora
    - Rehmannia
  - - Lindenbergia (Lindenbergieae)
    - remaining Orobanchaceae

=== Evolution ===
Development of the haustoria was a significant evolutionary event that allowed for the advancement of parasitic plants. The holoparasitic clade, Orobanche, delineates the first transition from hemiparasitism to holoparasitism within Orobanchaceae.

Plastid genes group all parasitic members of the Orobanchaceae, both hemiparasitic and holoparasitic, into a single monophyletic clade. This phylogenetic relationship supports both the merging of the hemiparasitic members of the Scrophulariaceae with the Orobanchaceae, and also the hypothesis of one origin of hemiparasitism within the family, making it a key trait for delimiting clades and reconstructing evolutionary history. More recent phylogenetic analyses looking at nuclear orthologous genes across the major lineages of the Orobanchaceae have led to a highly resolved phylogeny that confirms these previous findings, adding that the common ancestor for parasitic species within the Orobanchaceae appeared approximately 38.6 million years ago.

Once this parasitic habit evolved, holoparasitism is thought to have arisen several times independently, although the exact number is the subject of some debate. The plastid gene study, Young et al. (1999), states that holoparasitism evolved five times in different lineages: Once from Harveya, Lathraea and the traditional Orobanchaceae as well as the genus Alectra and the genus Striga. Importantly, more recent studies have found three origins of holoparasitism, with the origin at the genus Alectra belonging to the same lineage as that of Harveya, and Striga sometimes considered a hemiparasite as some species conduct photosynthesis for parts of their life cycles. These independent origins of holoparasitism illustrate homoplastic traits within a monophyletic group and highlight that while parasitism does act as a unifying trait for parts of the Orobanchaceae, it is a much more complex feature than originally thought. The repeated evolution of complete reliance on parasitism has significant impacts for understanding the mechanisms behind Orobanchaceous diversification.

This pattern of the evolution of holoparasitism does not support previous systematic conclusions based on the idea of an evolutionary series throughout the hemiparasitic to holoparasitic genera of the Scrophulariaceae and the Orobanchaceae. Rather, these new conclusions emphasize the role that parasitism plays on diversification within the Orobanchaceae, highlighting the fact that different parasitic lineages arose in different evolutionary contexts, and that the internal systematics of the Orobanchaceae can be better understood as multiple branching points of differentiation rather than a linear gradient leading to one form of parasitism.

=== Genomics ===
The parasitism and its different modes have been suggested to have an impact on genome evolution, with increased DNA substitution rates in parasitic organisms compared to non-parasitic taxa. For example, holoparasite taxa of Orobanchaceae exhibit faster molecular evolutionary rates than confamilial hemiparasites in three plastid genes.

In a study comparing the rates of molecular evolution of parasitic versus non parasitic taxa for 12 pairs of angiosperm families — including Apodanthaceae, Cytinaceae, Rafflesiaceae, Cynomoriaceae, Krameriaceae, Mitrastemonaceae, Boraginaceae, Orobanchaceae, Convolvulaceae, Lauraceae, Hydnoraceae, and Santalaceae/Olacaceae —, parasitic taxa evolve on average faster than their close relatives for mitochondrial, plastid, and nuclear genome sequences. Whereas Orobanchaceae fit to this trend for plastid DNA, they appear to evolve slower than their non parasitic counterpart in comparisons involving nuclear and mitochondrial DNA.

=== Genera ===
As of February 2025, Plants of the World Online accepted 99 genera. Three further genera are accepted by other sources, and are included in the following list.

- Aeginetia L.
- Agalinis Raf.
- Alectra Thunb.
- Anisantherina Pennell
- Aphyllon Mitch.
- Asepalum Marais
- Aureolaria Raf.
- Bardotia Eb.Fisch., Schäferh. & Kai Müll.
- Bartsia L.
- Baumia Engl. & Gilg
- Bellardia All.
- Boschniakia C.A.Mey. ex Bongard
- Brachystigma Pennell
- Brandisia Hook.f. & Thomson
- Buchnera L.
- Bungea C.A.Mey.
- Buttonia McKen ex Benth.
- Campbellia Wight
- Castilleja Mutis ex L.f.
- Centranthera R.Br.
- Chloropyron Behr
- Christisonia Gardner
- Cistanche Hoffmanns. & Link
- Conopholis Wallr.
- Cordylanthus Nutt. ex Benth.
- Cyclocheilon Oliv.
- Cycniopsis Engl.
- Cycnium E.Mey. ex Benth.
- Cymbaria L.
- Dasistoma Raf.
- Dicranostegia (A.Gray) Pennell
- Epifagus Nutt.
- Eremitilla Yatsk. & J.L.Contr.
- Escobedia Ruiz & Pav.
- Esterhazya J.C.Mikan
- Euphrasia L.
- Gerardiina Engl.
- Ghikaea Volkens & Schweinf.
- Gleadovia Gamble & Prain
- Graderia Benth.
- Harveya Hook.
- Hedbergia Molau
- Hiernia S.Moore
- Hyobanche L.
- Kopsiopsis (Beck) Beck
- Lamourouxia Kunth
- Lathraea L.
- Leptorhabdos Schrenk ex Fisch. & C.A.Mey.
- Leucosalpa Scott Elliot
- Lindenbergia Lehm.
- Macranthera Nutt. ex Benth.
- Magdalenaea Brade
- Mannagettaea Harry Sm.
- Melampyrum L.
- Melasma P.J.Bergius
- Micrargeria Benth.
- Micrargeriella R.E.Fr.
- Monochasma Maxim. ex Franch. & Sav.
- Neobartsia Uribe-Convers & Tank
- Nesogenes A.DC.
- Nothobartsia Bolliger & Molau
- Nothochilus Radlk.
- Odontitella Rothm.
- Odontites Ludw.
- Omphalotrix Maxim.
- Orobanche L.
- Orthocarpus Nutt.
- Parasopubia H.-P.Hofm. & Eb.Fisch.
- Parentucellia Viv.
- Pedicularis L.
- Phacellanthus Siebold & Zucc.
- Phelipanche Pomel
- Phelypaea Tourn. ex L.
- Phtheirospermum Bunge ex Fisch. & C.A.Mey.
- Physocalyx Pohl
- Pseudobartsia D.Y.Hong
- Pseudomelasma Eb.Fisch.
- Pseudosopubia Engl.
- Pseudostriga Bonati
- Pterygiella Oliv.
- Radamaea Benth.
- Rehmannia Libosch. ex Fisch. & C.A.Mey.
- Rhamphicarpa Benth.
- Rhaphispermum Benth.
- Rhinanthus L.
- Rhynchocorys Griseb.
- Schwalbea L.
- Seymeria Pursh
- Seymeriopsis Tzvelev
- Sieversandreas Eb.Fisch.
- Silviella Pennell
- Siphonostegia Benth. (syn. Lesquereuxia Boiss. & Reut.)
- Sopubia Buch.-Ham. ex D.Don
- Striga Lour.
- Tetraspidium Baker
- Thunbergianthus Engl.
- Tozzia L.
- Triaenophora Soler.
- Triphysaria Fisch. & C.A.Mey.
- Vellosiella Baill.
- Xylanche Beck
- Xylocalyx Balf.f.

=== Genera by life history trait ===
Orobanchaceae genera listed according to their life history trait.

- Bartsiella
- Bornmuellerantha
- Brachystigma
- Brandisia
- Cyclocheilon
- Kopsiopsis
- Macrosyringion
- Odontiella

==== Non-parasitic ====
- Lindenbergia
- Rehmannia (Note: Sometimes placed outside of Orobanchaceae as a sister-taxon.)
- Triaenophora

==== Hemiparasitic ====
- Agalinis
- Alectra
- Asepalum
- Aureolaria
- Bartsia
- Bellardia
- Buchnera
- Bungea
- Buttonia
- Castilleja : Indian paintbrush
- Centranthera
- Chloropyron
- Cordylanthus : Bird's-beak
- Cycnium
- Cymbaria
- Dasistoma
- Dicranostegia
- Escobedia
- Esterhazya
- Euphrasia
- Gerardiina
- Ghikaea
- Graderia
- Hedbergia
- Lamourouxia
- Leptorhabdos
- Leucosalpa
- Macranthera
- Magdalenaea
- Melampyrum
- Melasma
- Micrargeria
- Micrargeriella
- Monochasma
- Nesogenes
- Nothobartsia
- Nothochilus
- Odontites
- Omphalotrix
- Orthocarpus
- Parastriga
- Parentucellia
- Pedicularis
- Petitmenginia
- Phtheirospermum
- Physocalyx
- Pseudobartsia
- Pseudomelasma
- Pseudosopubia
- Pseudostriga
- Pterygiella
- Radamaea
- Rhamphicarpa
- Rhaphispermum
- Rhinanthus
- Rhynchocorys
- Schwalbea
- Seymeria
- Seymeriopsis
- Sieversandreas
- Silviella
- Siphonostegia
- Sopubia
- Spirostegia
- Striga
- Tetraspidium
- Thunbergianthus
- Tozzia
- Triphysaria
- Vellosiella
- Xizangia
- Xylocalyx

==== Holoparasitic ====
- Aeginetia
- Aphyllon
- Boschniakia : Groundcone
- Christisonia
- Cistanche: Desert broomrape
- Conopholis : Cancer-root
- Epifagus : Beechdrops
- Eremitilla
- Gleadovia
- Harveya
- Hyobanche
- Lathraea
- Mannagettaea
- Orobanche : Broomrape
- Phacellanthus
- Phelypaea
- Platypholis
- Tienmuia

== Distribution ==
The family Orobanchaceae has a cosmopolitan distribution, found mainly in temperate Eurasia, North America, South America, parts of Australia, New Zealand, and tropical Africa. The only exception to its distribution is Antarctica, though some genera may be found in subarctic regions.

== Ecology ==
This family has tremendous economic importance because of the damage to crops caused by some species in the genera Orobanche and Striga. They often parasitize cereal crops like sugarcane, maize, millet, sorghum, and other major agricultural crops like cowpea, sunflower, hemp, tomatoes, and legumes. Because of the ubiquitous nature of these particular parasites in developing countries, it is estimated to affect the livelihood of over 100 million people, killing 20 to 100 percent of crops depending on infestation.

Some genera, especially Cistanche and Conopholis, are threatened by human activity, including habitat destruction and over-harvesting of both the plants and their hosts.

Research for this plant family can often be difficult due to its permit requirements for collection, travel, and research.
