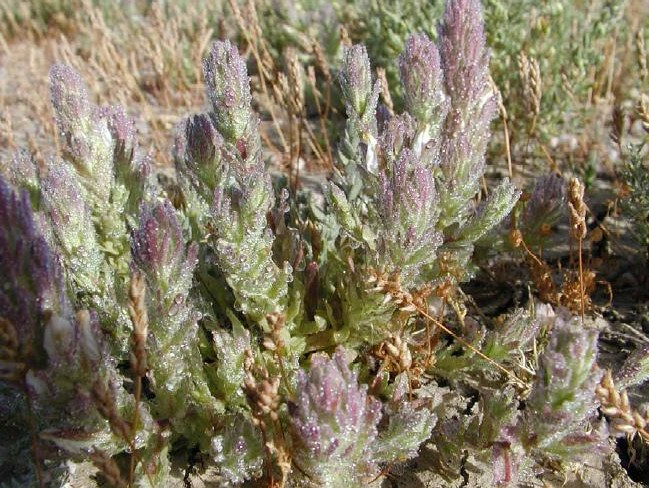

Conservation status
- Endangered (ESA)

Scientific classification
- Kingdom: Plantae
- Clade: Tracheophytes
- Clade: Angiosperms
- Clade: Eudicots
- Clade: Asterids
- Order: Lamiales
- Family: Orobanchaceae
- Genus: Chloropyron
- Species: C. palmatum

Binomial name
- Chloropyron palmatum (Ferris) Tank & J.M.Egger

Synonyms
- Adenostegia palmata Ferris; Cordylanthus palmatus (Ferris) J.F.Macbr.

= Chloropyron palmatum =

Species of flowering plant

Chloropyron palmatum (formerly Cordylanthus palmatus) is an endangered species of salt-tolerant, flowering plant in the family Orobanchaceae. It is a low, highly branched herbaceous annual with each flower enclosed by a single, characteristically palmate bract. It is known by the common names of palmate salty bird's-beak and palmate-bract bird's-beak.

== Names ==
A 2016 list recorded the following vernacular names for this species:

palmate salty bird's-beak; palmate bird's-beak; palmate-bracted bird's-beak; palmate-bract bird's-beak; palm-bract bird's-beak; and Ferris's bird's-beak.

Note: Variations in apostrophe & hyphen use are omitted here. Also, some names may have been taken from Wikipedia.

== Taxonomy ==
The Californian botanist Roxana Stinchfield Ferris first described this species as Adenostegia palmata in 1918. Ferris had already mentioned that her usage of the respected English taxonomist George Bentham's junior synonym Adenostegia may have been incorrect. Bentham had first used the name Adenostegia in 1836 (for Cordylanthus rigidus), but he then renamed his species using Thomas Nuttall's unpublished manuscript name Cordylanthus, because he liked the etymology of that name more. In three different 1891 publications three different botanical taxonomists, the American Edward Lee Greene, the Austrian Richard Wettstein and the German Otto Kuntze, had all pointed out that Bentham's name had priority, and as such Ferris classified the new taxon in Adenostegia, but nonetheless James Francis Macbride moved the species to the genus Cordylanthus the following year.

In 1947 the Scrophulariaceae expert (these plants were classified in that botanical family at the time) Francis W. Pennell described a neighbouring population as the new species C. carnosulus. In 1958 the Californian taxonomist Philip A. Munz subsumed this taxon as a subspecies of C. palmatus. Curiously, this taxon seems to have been forgotten by the relevant authorities, as it has never been formally synonymised, nor does is appear to still be recognised.

In 2001 Olmstead et al. moved all Cordylanthus taxa from the family figwort family (Scrophulariaceae) to the broomrape family (Orobanchaceae).

In 2009 Tank et al. split the genus Cordylanthus into three genera, moving Cordylanthus palmatus to the new genus Chloropyron.

== Description ==
Chloropyron palmatum is an annual herb growing 10 to 30 centimeters tall. Its leaves are gray-green in color, up to 18 millimeters long, and usually irregularly toothed, although the lower leaves can be entire.

The plant is glandular, and covered in short hairs. It is often encrusted with the salt crystals it has excreted.

The sparse leaves are oblong. The bracts subtending the flowers are lobed along the margin.

The inflorescence is a dense columnar spike of flowers up to 15 centimeters long. Each flower is up to 2 centimeters long and has a fuzzy white pouch, sometimes tinted purple, enclosed in darker sepals. It is subtended by a single palmate bract.

Bracts are 12–18 millimeters long, pale lavender, and deeply divided with 2–3 pairs of lobes, the middle lobe longer than the others (hence "palmate").

== Distribution ==
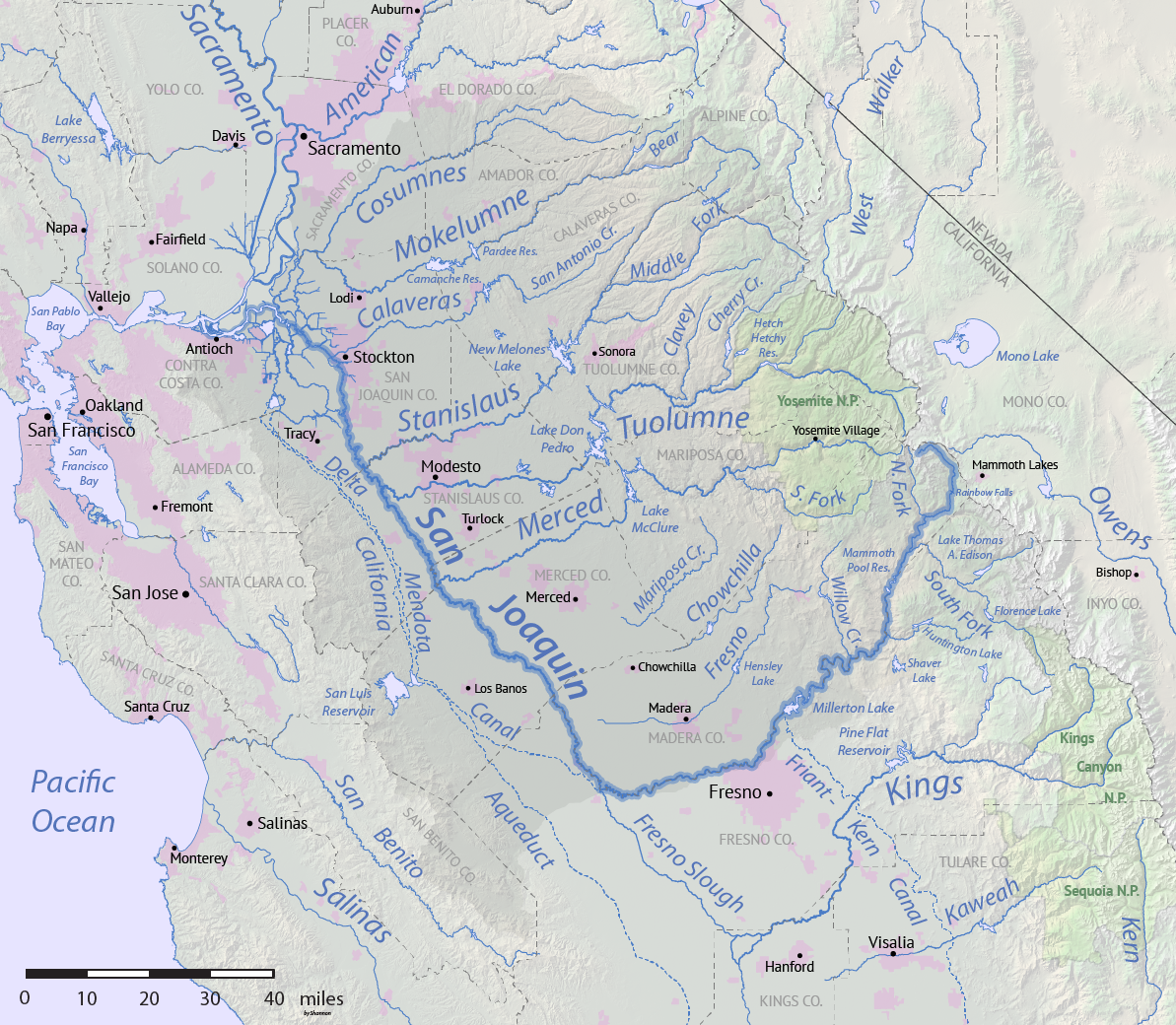
San Joaquin River watershed in the Central Valley

The plant is endemic to the Central Valley of California, where it has been recorded in the counties of Colusa, Yolo, Alameda, San Joaquin, Madera and Fresno. The species has been introduced to Glenn County. It has been extirpated from San Joaquin County.

According to one source the plant is currently known from 21 locations in seven metapopulations. The California Native Plant Society, on the other hand, records 14 locations: Kerman*, Tranquillity, Firebaugh*, Poso Farm, Altamont, Livermore, Stockton West*, Grays Bend, Grimes*, Colusa, Arbuckle, Logandale, Maxwell and Moulton Weir. In these areas there are said to be 25 subpopulations, of which 17 are extant, 5 possibly extirpated, and 3 are presumably extirpated -possibly or presumably extirpated populations have an asterisk added to them. Note that the species may still be present in some areas, possibly returning from a seedbank when conditions are favorable.

== Ecology ==
Chloropyron palmatum has likely always been naturally rare because it occurs in a rare type of habitat: an alkali sink. The plant is limited to seasonally-flooded flats with saline and alkaline soils, where it grows with other halophytes such as iodine bush (Allenrolfea occidentalis) and alkali heath (Frankenia salina). It is a hemiparasite. It occurs from 5 to 155 meters in altitude. It flowers from May to October.

== Conservation ==
It has been federally listed as an endangered species since 1986, as well as by the state of California since 1984. The main threat to its existence is the destruction of its already naturally limited habitat, for agriculture and development uses, with other adverse effects from alteration in hydrology, off-road vehicles, and grazing of livestock.
