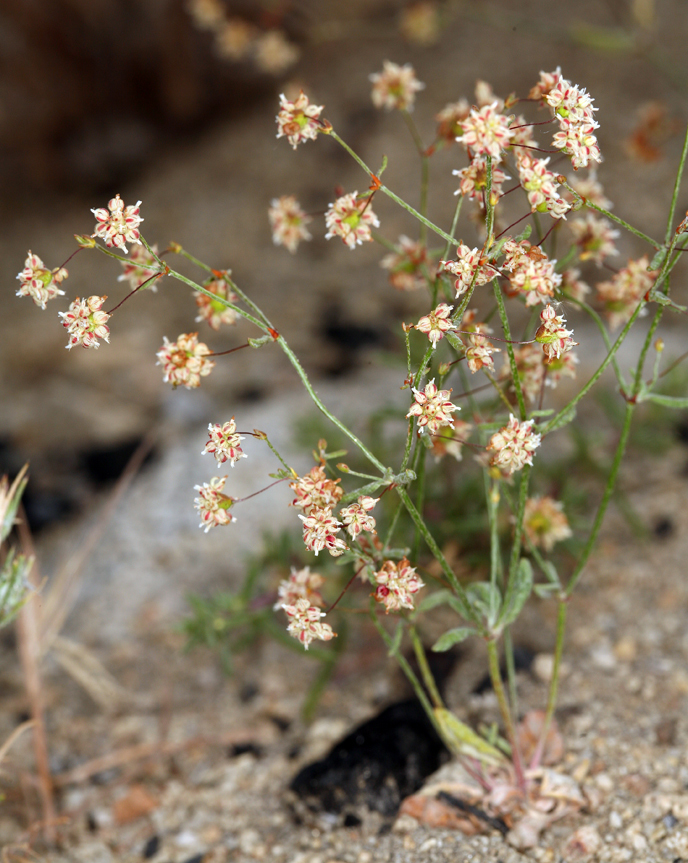

Conservation status
- Secure (NatureServe)

Scientific classification
- Kingdom: Plantae
- Clade: Tracheophytes
- Clade: Angiosperms
- Clade: Eudicots
- Order: Caryophyllales
- Family: Polygonaceae
- Genus: Eriogonum
- Species: E. maculatum

Binomial name
- Eriogonum maculatum A.Heller

= Eriogonum maculatum =

Species of wild buckwheat

Eriogonum maculatum is a species of wild buckwheat known by the common name spotted buckwheat. It is native to western North America from Washington to Baja California to Utah, where it can be found in a number of habitats, often in abundance.

== Description ==
This is an erect annual herb reaching heights of anywhere from 5 to 40 centimeters. Most of the woolly leaves are located at the base of the plant, but there may be a few along the stem.

The branching inflorescence holds many clusters of bright red and white striped flowers. Each flower is a few millimeters wide with distinctly cup-shaped tepals which are covered in minute spiky glands. The bright striping on the small tepals make the flower cluster look spotted from afar, hence its common name. It grows in sand, gravel or clay slopes and flats, grassland, and shrub-steppe.

== Taxonomy ==
Eriogonum maculatum was scientifically described and named by Amos Arthur Heller in 1906. It was twice described as part of Eriogonum angulosum, as a variety by Willis Linn Jepson in 1913 and as a subspecies by Susan Gabriella Stokes in 1936. It is classified as part of the Eriogonum genus within the Polygonaceae family. In total it has three botanical synonyms.

Table of Synonyms
Name	Year	Rank	Notes
Eriogonum angulosum subsp. maculatum (A.Heller) S.Stokes	1936	subspecies	≡ hom.
Eriogonum angulosum var. maculatum (A.Heller) Jeps.	1913	variety	≡ hom.
Eriogonum angulosum var. rectipes Gand.	1906	variety	= het.
Notes: ≡ homotypic synonym; = heterotypic synonym

== Range ==
Spotted buckwheat is native to the western United States and northwestern Mexico. In the northwestern US it grows in just Yakima County, Washington, but four counties in eastern Oregon and five counties in southwestern Idaho. In the southwestern US it grows in western Utah and Arizona, but is found throughout Nevada. In California it is mainly in southern California with only Lassen County recorded in the north. According to Plants of the World Online it is also native to New Mexico. In Mexico it is only found in the state of Baja California.
