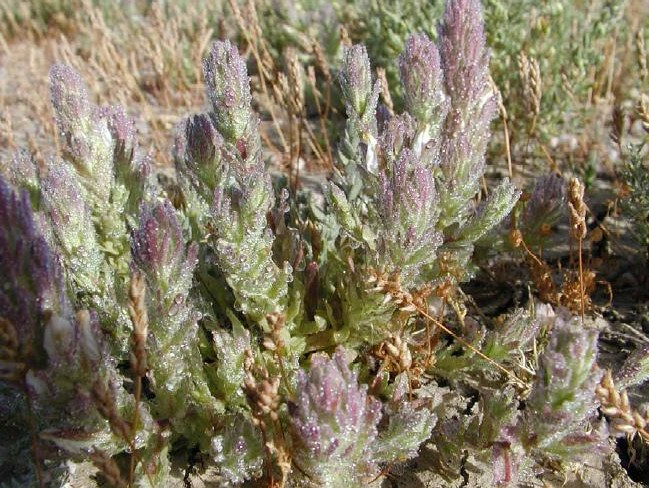
- Chloropyron palmatum at Delevan National Wildlife Refuge, California, USA

Scientific classification
- Kingdom: Plantae
- Clade: Tracheophytes
- Clade: Angiosperms
- Clade: Eudicots
- Clade: Asterids
- Order: Lamiales
- Family: Orobanchaceae
- Tribe: Pedicularideae
- Subtribe: Castillejinae
- Genus: Chloropyron; Behr

Synonyms
- Adenostegia Benth., pro parte

= Chloropyron =

Genus of plants

Chloropyron is a genus of plants in the botanical family Orobanchaceae. The plants of this group were formerly classified in the subgenus Hemistegia of the genus Cordylanthus, but were elevated to genus level by David C. Tank, John Mark Egger and Richard G. Olmstead in 2009 after molecular phylogenetic work.

== Taxonomy ==
The genus Chloropyron was first described by the German-American polymath Hans Hermann Behr, an immigrant to San Francisco, in 1855. Behr was largely ignored, and the known species were classified in the genus Cordylanthus, but the species now placed in the modern genus Chloropyron were classified in an unranked infrageneric group by Asa Gray in 1867, which he called Hemistegia.

The first species to be described was Chloropyron maritimum. Thomas Nuttall first described it in the genus Cordylanthus, but this was only in an unpublished manuscript, and was thus not a valid taxonomic name. George Bentham, however, revived the name in his 1846 entry on these plants in Augustin Pyramus de Candolle's Prodromus Systematis Naturalis Regni Vegetabilis.

In three different 1891 publications three different botanical taxonomists, the American Edward Lee Greene, the Austrian Richard Wettstein and the German Otto Kuntze, had all pointed out that Bentham's 1836 name, Adenostegia, had priority, and all of the Cordylanthus species were transferred to that name.

Wettstein, following Gray's Flora of North America, continued to recognise Gray's Hemistegia group, ranking the group at the level of section. He recognised 3 species of Adenostegia, and split these three into two unranked subgroups, with A. kingii and A. maritima in group A, having four developed stamens in their flowers, and A. mollis as the single species in group B, having only two developed stamens.

During the first meeting of the new International Botanical Congress in Vienna in 1905, the International Code of Botanical Nomenclature (ICBN) was promulgated, in which it was decided that certain names, despite being incorrect according to the principle of priority, should be conserved in order to preserve taxonomic stability. It was thus decided that although Cordylanthus was a junior synonym of Adenostegia, this name should be conserved.

In 1911 the Californian botanist Willis Linn Jepson raised the section Hemistegia up to the level of subgenus.

Although the ICBN was accepted throughout the world, an exception was in the United States where a number of botanists rejected the new rules, and as such, when a new species in the group was added by the Californian botanist Roxana Stinchfield Ferris in her 1918 monograph on the genus, she ignored the modern rules of nomenclature and named her new species Adenostegia palmata. This was promptly rectified by the Harvard University botanist James Francis Macbride the following year. In any case, Ferris also ignored Jepson's classification of Hemistegia as a subgenus, maintaining Wettstein's system of sections, moved Adenostegia kingii out of the group, and, oddly considering her upholding of Bentham's priority, renames the subgenus Hemistegia to Chloropyron. She recognised four species in this section, the earlier-mentioned Adenostegia palmata, the two long-standing species A. maritima and A. mollis, and also moved Gray's Cordylanthus canescens to the section.

In 1951 Francis W. Pennell recognised six species in the group. The botanist Herbert Louis Mason reduced this to three species in his 1957 book A Flora of the Marshes of California. In 1950 Chloropyron tecopense was described (as Cordylanthus tecopensis) by Philip Alexander Munz and John Christian Roos. In 1973 the botanists Tsan-iang Chuang and Lawrence R. Heckard, excluding this new species, also recognised three species from Pennell's six, but used a completely different circumscription, so that Mason's taxa are not clearly synonymous with their species.

== Description ==
These are small annual herbaceous plants coloured green or greenish-grey, often tinged in red or purple due to anthocyanins. The tallest reach 60 cm in height.

== Distribution ==
This genus occurs in the western United States (California, Nevada, Oregon, Utah), as well as Baja California in Mexico.

== Ecology ==
The species are native to salt flats, salt marshes and alkaline soils. They are all small herbaceous plants which are hemiparasites using haustoria attached to their roots to steal nutrients from the roots of their host plants.

== Species ==
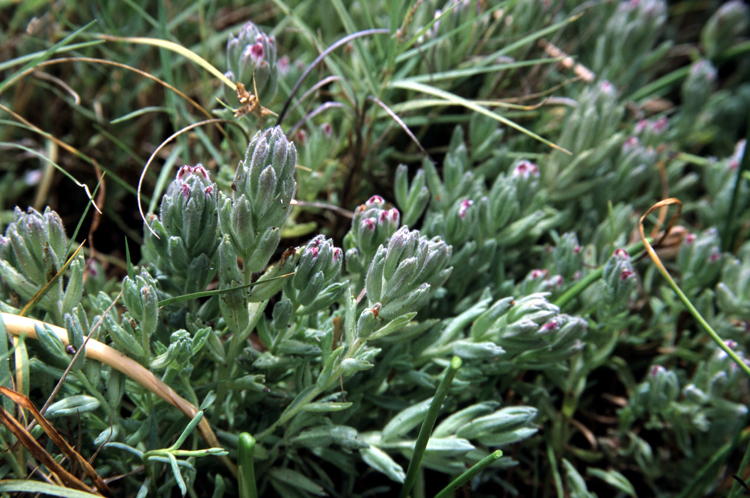
Cordylanthus maritimus ssp. palustris at Humboldt Bay National Wildlife Refuge, California, USA

- Chloropyron maritimum (Nutt. ex Benth.) A.Heller
- Chloropyron molle (A.Gray) A.Heller
- Chloropyron palmatum (Ferris) Tank & J.M.Egger
- Chloropyron tecopense (Munz & J.C.Roos) Tank & J.M.Egger
