= California coastal salt marsh =

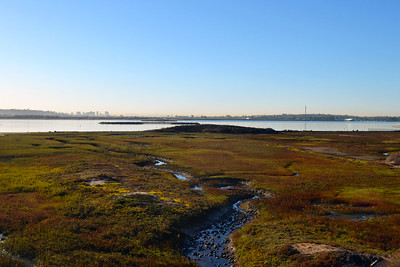
Mission Bay Wetlands in San Diego, California, taken by Joanna Gilkeson and the USFWS. Public Domain Mark 1.0 (PDM 1.0).

California's coastal salt marsh is a wetland plant community that occurs sporadically along the Pacific Coast from Humboldt Bay to San Diego. This salt marsh type is found in bays, harbors, inlets, and other protected areas subject to tidal flooding.

== Plant habitat ==
Plant species in this community are halophytes adapted to the saline conditions and low oxygen content typically found in the water-saturated soils. As a result of the demanding conditions, species diversity is relatively low.

Typical plant species in this community include:

- Salt grass (Distichlis spicata)
- Franconia (Frankenia salina)
- Pickleweed and glasswort (Salicornia spp.)
- Cordgrass (Spartina foliosa)
- Seep weed (Suaeda californica)

Plants occur in bands that are determined by the amount of submergence a species can tolerate. Most tolerant of submergence is cordgrass which has a hollow stem that allows oxygen to reach its roots . Further inland, pickleweeds and glassworts are predominant where their roots are flooded only during the highest tides. The salt-marsh bird's-beak (Cordylanthus maritimus) is an endangered plant species that occurs in this habitat.

Even though the coastal marshes lack species diversity as a whole, there are differing plants between the marshes themselves. Vegetation structure and function can differ due to intertidal zone location, tidal movements of the marsh, and soil salinity.

== Animal habitat ==
Few terrestrial animals inhabit the coastal salt marsh. One endangered mammal is the salt marsh harvest mouse (Reithrodontomys raviventris) which occurs in the San Francisco Bay region. Likewise, only five species of birds are resident in this habitat and four are considered rare or endangered.

== Preservation ==
The California coastal salt marshes are vital ecosystems. To best preserve and restore them, research on microbial communities and sediment has been conducted.

In a research study done by the Pacific Estuarine Ecosystem Indicators Research Consortium in 2006, they investigated the effects of environmental factors and pollutants on the microbial communities of the California coastal salt marshes. Taking samples of marshes of varying sizes, the study observed and analyzed metals, pesticides, and pollutants in the sediment over a two-year period. Results concluded that both the natural environment and pollutants of the marsh impacted sediment microbial communities, though each factor's effect can be difficult to distinguish without careful testing. Microbial communities were most affected by marsh size, elevation, and tides, followed by metals, then organic pollutants. Their analyses also discovered relationships between the concentration of pollutants, like metals, and specific fatty acids, suggesting that the microbial community can be analyzed to gauge marsh ecosystem health.

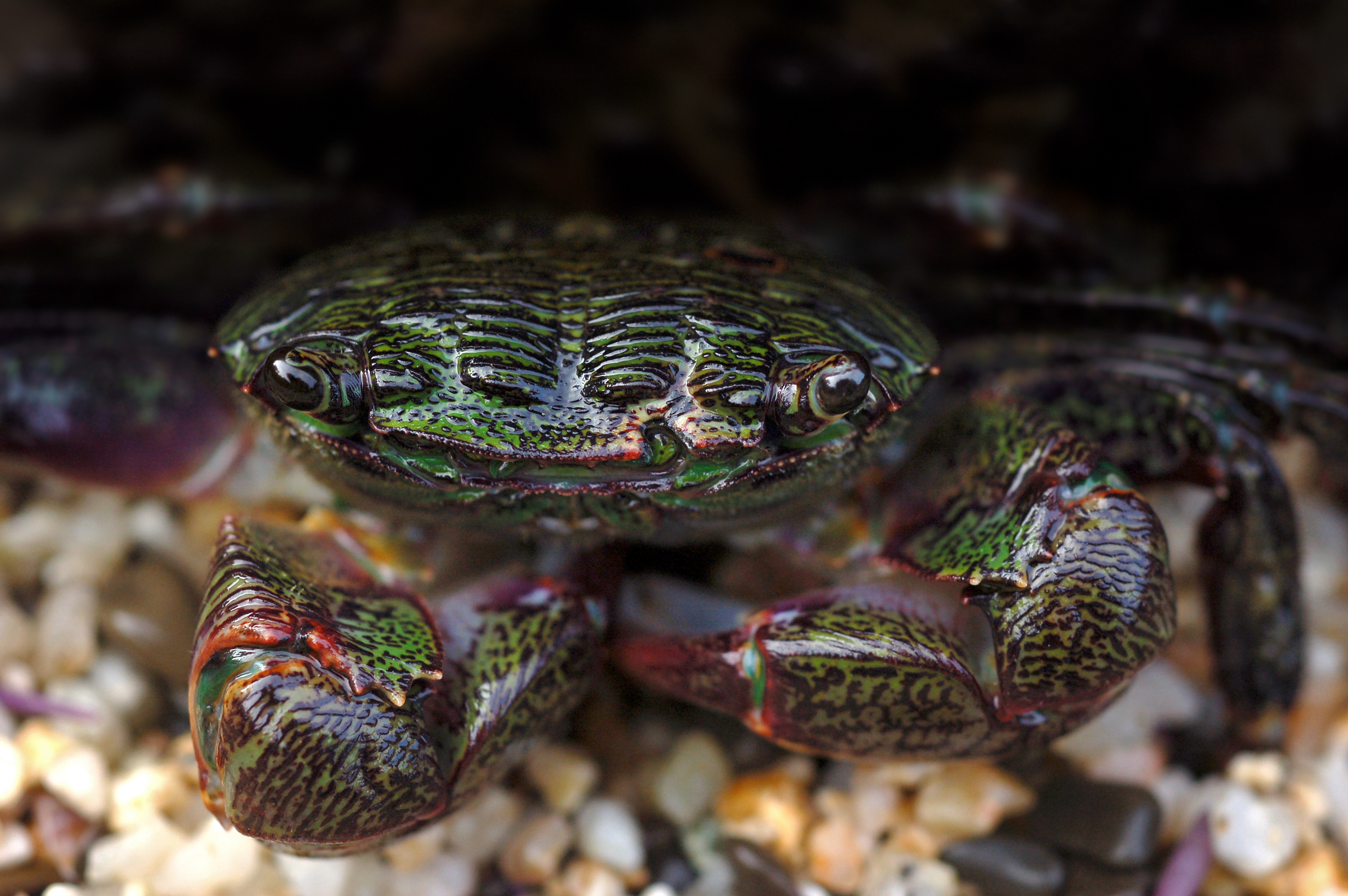
Lined shore crab (Pachygrapsus crassipes)

Another study in 2013 aimed to assess sediment quality with the sediment quality triad and any changes to biological attributes in marsh species. After observing several marshes of varying levels of contamination, as well as two control marshes, the study found significant biological differences in two species, the longjaw mudsucker (Gillichthys mirabilis) and the lined shore crab (Pachygrapsus crassipes), between contaminated and non-contaminated marshes. Notable differences were found at both a microscopic level, in crab embryo abnormalities, and a macroscopic level, in benthic invertebrate diversity. The study ultimately concluded that incorporating the observation of biological responses in marsh species under field conditions, particularly those of lined shore crabs and longjaw mudsuckers, could enhance the sediment quality triad, and provide a more comprehensive assessment of California salt marsh's sediment quality overall.

== See also ==
- Plant communities of California
- Ecology
- Natural environment
