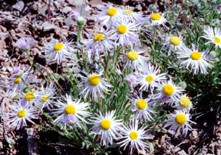

Conservation status
- Apparently Secure (NatureServe)

Scientific classification
- Kingdom: Plantae
- Clade: Tracheophytes
- Clade: Angiosperms
- Clade: Eudicots
- Clade: Asterids
- Order: Asterales
- Family: Asteraceae
- Genus: Erigeron
- Species: E. pulcherrimus

Binomial name
- Erigeron pulcherrimus A.Heller

Synonyms
- Synonymy: Wyomingia pulcherrima (A. Heller) A. Nelson; Erigeron andinus var. pulcher (Phil.) Reiche; Erigeron bistiensis G.L.Nesom & Hevron; Erigeron grayi A.Heller; Erigeron wyomingia Rydb.

= Erigeron pulcherrimus =

Species of flowering plant

Erigeron pulcherrimus is a North American species of flowering plant in the family Asteraceae known by the common name basin fleabane. The species grows in the western United States in the eastern part of the Intermountain Region west of the Rocky Mountains. It has been found in Wyoming, Colorado, Utah, New Mexico, and Arizona.

Erigeron pulcherrimus is a perennial herb up to 35 centimeters (14 inches) tall, producing a large taproot. The plant generally produces only 1 flower head per stem. Each head has 25–60 blue, pink or white ray florets surrounding numerous yellow disc florets. The species grows in dry places with silty or gravelly soil, sometimes high in salt, selenium, or gypsum.
