= Hieracium nudicaule =

Scientific classification
- Kingdom: Plantae
- Clade: Tracheophytes
- Clade: Angiosperms
- Clade: Eudicots
- Clade: Asterids
- Order: Asterales
- Family: Asteraceae
- Genus: Hieracium
- Species: H. nudicaule

Binomial name
- Hieracium nudicaule (A.Gray) A.Heller 1906

Synonyms
- Hieracium cynoglossoides var. nudicaule A.Gray 1883; Hieracium scouleri var. nudicaule (A.Gray) Cronquist

Species of flowering plant

Hieracium nudicaule is a North American plant species in the tribe Cichorieae within the family Asteraceae. It grows only in the western United States, primarily in California and Oregon, though with a few populations in Washington and northern Idaho.

Hieracium nudicaule is an herb up to 50 cm (20 in) tall, with leaves on the stem and also in a rosette at the bottom. Leaves are up to 120 mm (4.7 in) long, sometimes with teeth on the edges. One stalk can produce 2-12 flower heads in a flat-topped array. Each head has 20-40 yellow ray flowers but no disc flowers.
