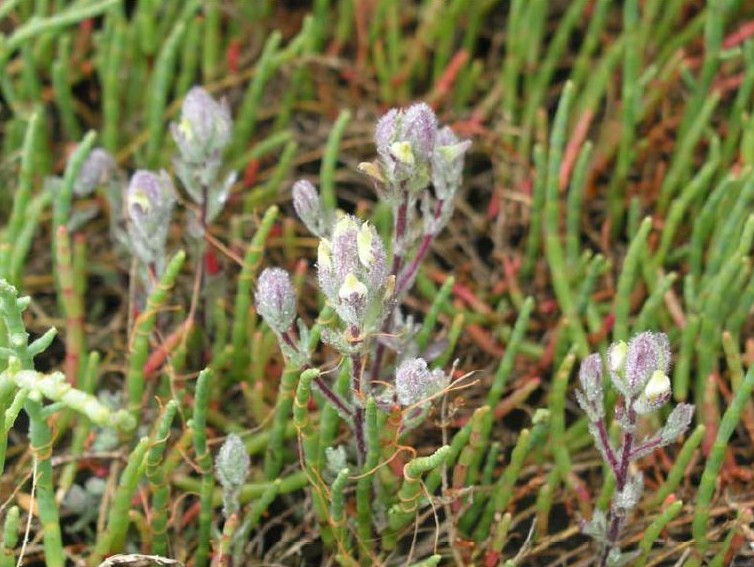
- Chloropyron molle subsp. molle

Conservation status
- Imperiled (NatureServe)

Scientific classification
- Kingdom: Plantae
- Clade: Tracheophytes
- Clade: Angiosperms
- Clade: Eudicots
- Clade: Asterids
- Order: Lamiales
- Family: Orobanchaceae
- Genus: Chloropyron
- Species: C. molle

Binomial name
- Chloropyron molle (A.Gray) A.Heller

= Chloropyron molle =

Species of aquatic plant

Chloropyron molle is a species of flowering plant in the family Orobanchaceae.

It is endemic to California, where it is known in coastal and inland salt marshes in the Central Valley, particularly the Sacramento-San Joaquin River Delta.

== Subspecies ==
Both subspecies are rare, one treated as a federally listed endangered species. In general this is a grayish or purplish green annual coated in long whitish hairs, sometimes bristly and glandular. The woolly inflorescence is a spike of club-shaped white flowers enclosed in densely hairy sepals.

Subspecies Chloropyron molle subsp. hispidus, the hispid bird's beak, grows in alkaline and saline soils of marshes and 'playas' (a local name for inland salt flats) in scattered locations throughout the Central Valley. Most of its habitat in the southern valley has been turned over for agriculture, leading to the extirpation of most of its populations there. The even less common Ch. molle subsp. molle, known by the common name soft bird's beak, is only known from the coastal salt marshes and swamps of the inner San Francisco Bay Area and delta. It is federally listed as an endangered species.

Threats to the survival of this subspecies include the invasive marsh plant Spartina patens, and destruction of its native habitat by erosion and drainage of the marshland.
