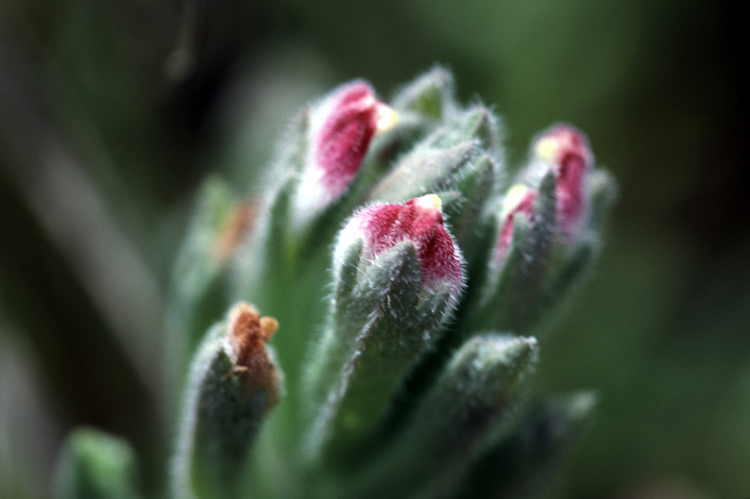
- Chloropyron maritimum subsp. palustre

Conservation status
- Apparently Secure (NatureServe)

Scientific classification
- Kingdom: Plantae
- Clade: Tracheophytes
- Clade: Angiosperms
- Clade: Eudicots
- Clade: Asterids
- Order: Lamiales
- Family: Orobanchaceae
- Genus: Chloropyron
- Species: C. maritimum

Binomial name
- Chloropyron maritimum (Nutt. ex Benth.) A.Heller

Synonyms
- Cordylanthus maritimus

= Chloropyron maritimum =

Species of flowering plant

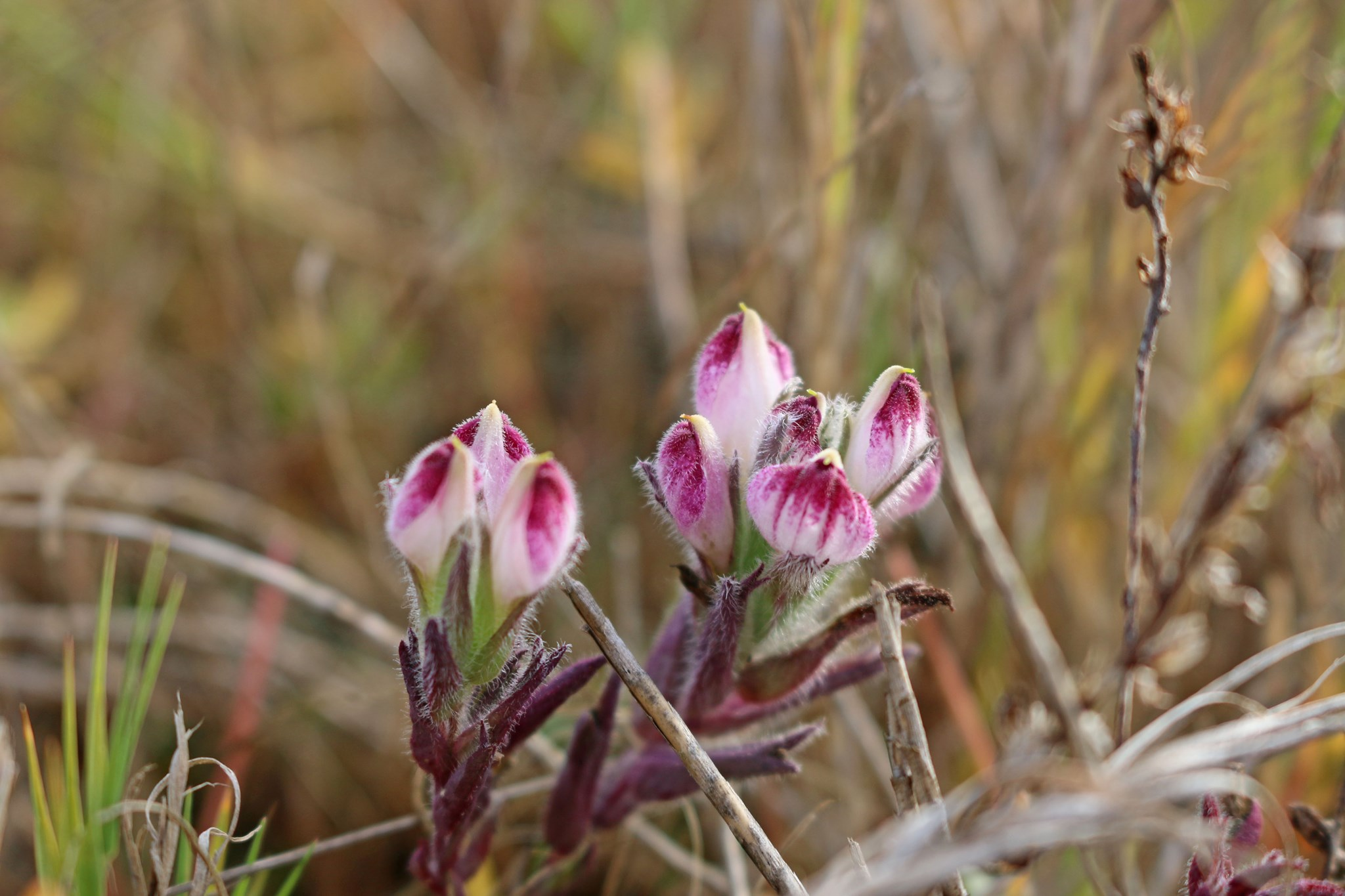
Chloropyron maritimum ssp. maritimum

Chloropyron maritimum is a rare species of flowering plant in the family Orobanchaceae native to western North America. It is known by the common names saltmarsh bird's beak and Point Reyes bird's beak, depending on the specific subspecies.

== Taxonomy ==
It was formerly classified as Cordylanthus maritimus, but is now considered to be in the genus Chloropyron. There are three subspecies described: Chloropyron maritimum ssp. maritimum, C. maritimum ssp. canescens, and C. maritimum ssp. palustre.

== Distribution and habitat ==
It is native to the Western and Southwestern United States and northern Mexico, from southern Oregon to Baja California. This is a halophyte which grows in areas of high salt concentrations, including coastal salt marshes and the inland salt flats of the Great Basin. It is hemiparasitic, such that it is greenish and has chlorophyll but also parasitizes other plants by inserting haustoria into their roots to tap nutrients.

== Description ==
This plant grows in low clumps and has small, thick, gray-green hairy leaves often tinted with purple. It concentrates and excretes salts, giving its foliage a grainy crust. It erects an inflorescence several centimeters high which has many fuzz-covered white or cream club-shaped flowers with yellow or purplish tips. The fruit is a capsule containing many brown net-textured (reticulate) seeds.

== Conservation ==
Two subspecies of this plant are considered endangered. The nominate subspecies, Chloropyron maritimum ssp. maritimum, is listed as endangered by the State of California and the United States Government, and is considered a Critically Imperiled subspecies by NatureServe. Chloropyron maritimum ssp. palustre (Point Reyes bird's beak) is included in the California Native Plant Society Inventory of Rare and Endangered Plants of California, and is considered an Imperiled subspecies by NatureServe.
