= Cordylanthus eremicus =

Scientific classification
- Kingdom: Plantae
- Clade: Tracheophytes
- Clade: Angiosperms
- Clade: Eudicots
- Clade: Asterids
- Order: Lamiales
- Family: Orobanchaceae
- Genus: Cordylanthus
- Species: C. eremicus

Binomial name
- Cordylanthus eremicus (Coville & C.V.Morton) Munz

Species of flowering plant

Cordylanthus eremicus is a species of flowering plant in the family Orobanchaceae known by the common name desert bird's beak.

It is endemic to California, where it is known from dry mountainous habitat in the San Bernardino Mountains, the mountains of the Mojave Desert region, and the Kern Plateau in the southern Sierra Nevada. It grows in dry, rocky slopes and openings in pine or juniper forests.

It is a reddish or yellowish green woolly annual with linear, sometimes threadlike, leaves. The inflorescence is a spike of flowers, each with a multicolored corolla and a white hairy pouch.
