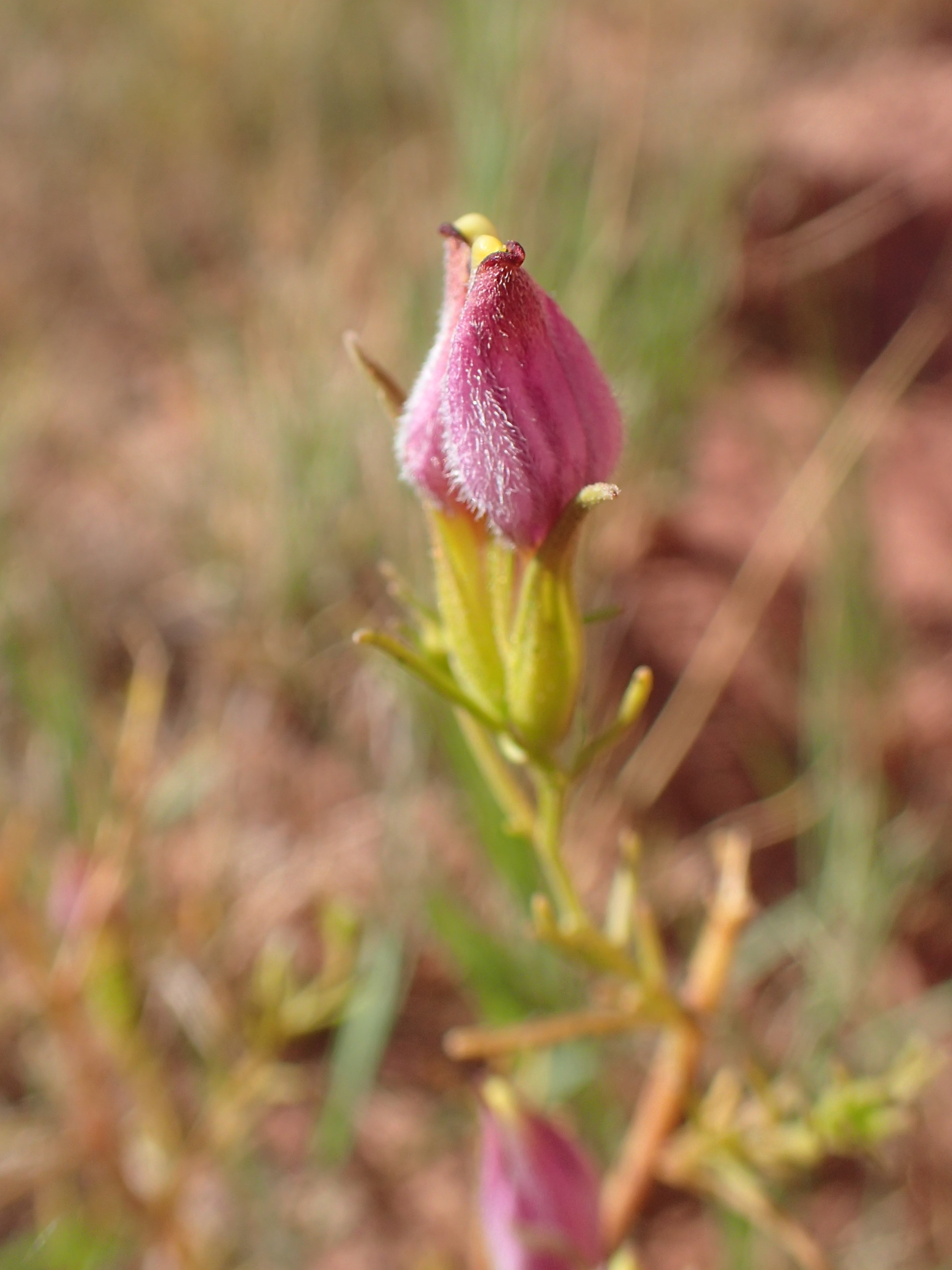
- Flower

Conservation status
- Apparently Secure (NatureServe)

Scientific classification
- Kingdom: Plantae
- Clade: Tracheophytes
- Clade: Angiosperms
- Clade: Eudicots
- Clade: Asterids
- Order: Lamiales
- Family: Orobanchaceae
- Genus: Cordylanthus
- Species: C. wrightii

Binomial name
- Cordylanthus wrightii A.Gray

= Cordylanthus wrightii =

Plant species in the broomrape family

Cordylanthus wrightii, or Wright's birdbeak, is an annual plant in the family Orobanchaceae found in the Colorado Plateau and Canyonlands region of the southwestern United States.

== Taxonomy ==
Cordylanthus wrightii was scientifically described and named by Asa Gray in 1859. It is classified in the genus Cordylanthus as part of the family Orobanchaceae.

According to Plants of the World Online it has three subspecies:

- Cordylanthus wrightii subsp. kaibabensis – Native to northern Arizona
- Cordylanthus wrightii subsp. tenuifolius – Southeast Arizona and southwest New Mexico
- Cordylanthus wrightii subsp. wrightii – Widespread, southwest US and northern Mexico

Cordylanthus wrightii has three synonyms of the species or of two of its three subspeices.

Table of Synonyms
Name	Year	Rank	Synonym of:	Notes
Adenostegia wrightii (A.Gray) Greene	1891	species	C. wrightii	≡ hom.
Cordylanthus tenuifolius Pennell	1940	species	subsp. tenuifolius	≡ hom.
Cordylanthus wrightii var. pauciflorus Kearney & Peebles	1939	variety	subsp. wrightii	= het.
Notes: ≡ homotypic synonym ; = heterotypic synonym
