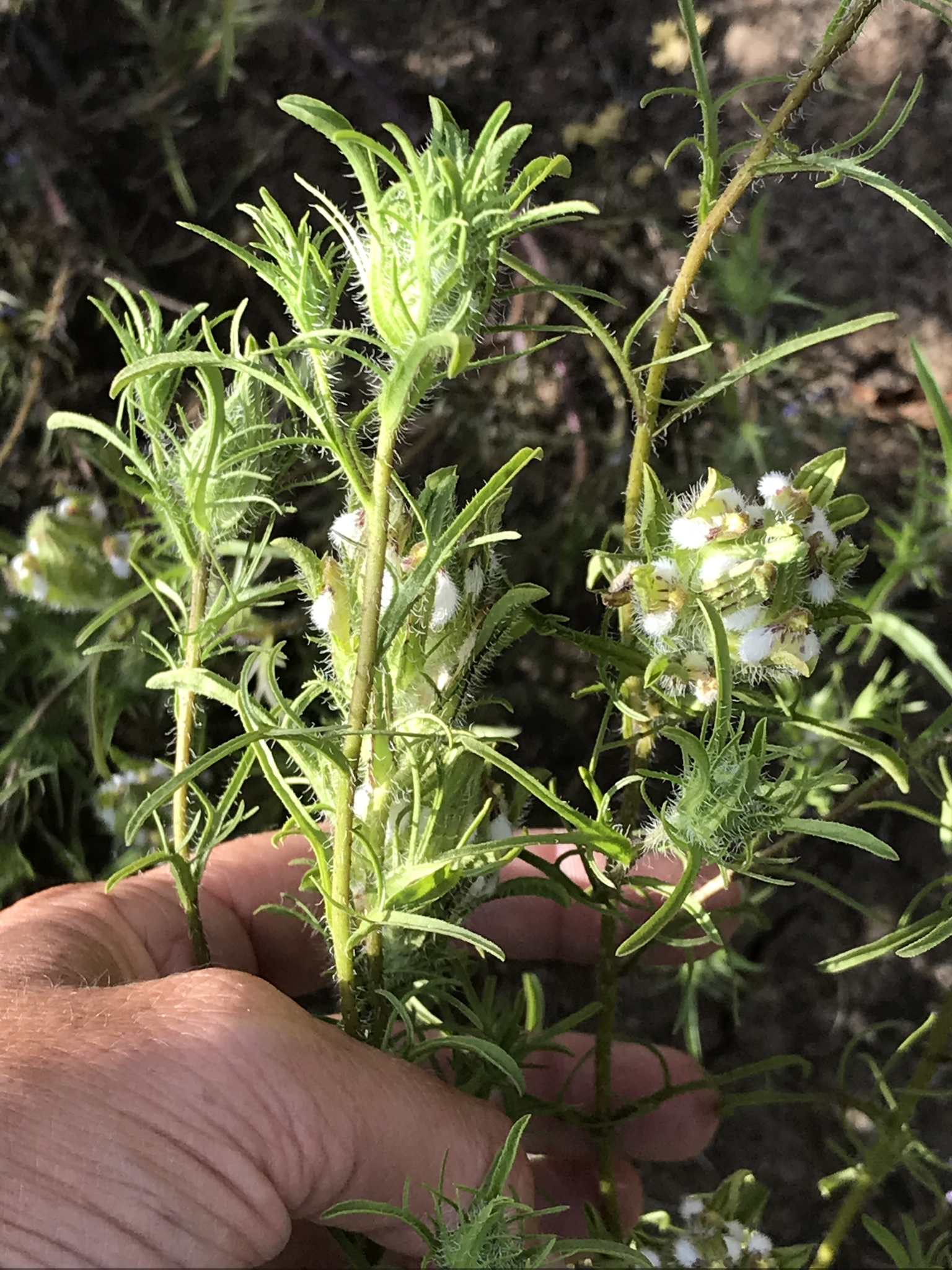

Conservation status
- Vulnerable (NatureServe)

Scientific classification
- Kingdom: Plantae
- Clade: Tracheophytes
- Clade: Angiosperms
- Clade: Eudicots
- Clade: Asterids
- Order: Lamiales
- Family: Orobanchaceae
- Tribe: Pedicularideae
- Subtribe: Castillejinae
- Genus: Dicranostegia (A.Gray) Pennell
- Species: D. orcuttiana

Binomial name
- Dicranostegia orcuttiana (A.Gray) Pennell, 1947

Synonyms
- Adenostegia orcuttiana (A.Gray) Greene, 1891; Cordylanthus orcuttianus A.Gray, 1883

= Dicranostegia =

Genus of plants

Dicranostegia is a monotypic genus of hemiparasitic flowering plants belonging to the family Orobanchaceae, containing the species Dicranostegia orcuttiana, commonly known as Orcutt's bird's beak or Baja bird's beak. It is near-endemic to Baja California, found from Miller's Landing north to Tijuana, but has a few occurrences in southern San Diego County, California. It is differentiated among other similar species (like Cordylanthus spp.) in California by its leaves with 8 to 11 lateral lobes that are paired. It was formerly placed in the genus Cordylanthus until phylogenetic analysis led to it being split off. This species is threatened by the destruction of its habitat from urbanization.

== Description ==
This annual hemiparasitic herb grows to 10–50 centimetres (3.9–19.7 in) in height and is green with dark-red markings, and often coated in stiff hairs. The roots are mostly yellowish in color, and form haustoria on their finer branches. The leaves are pinnately divided, arranged alternately, and are sessile. The pinnate leaves are lobed 8–11 times, and are 3–6 centimetres (1.2–2.4 in) long.

The inflorescence is a very dense cluster of flowers (an elongated spike) surrounded by leaf-like outer bracts. The inflorescence is 2–10 centimetres (0.79–3.94 in) tall. The inner bracts are 15–25 millimetres (0.59–0.98 in) long and lobe 3–7 times, shaped lance-oblong. The corolla of each flower is up to 25 mm (0.98 in) long and is made up of a club-shaped, yellow-tipped white fibrous pouch, enclosed by a sheath-like calyx of around half the length of the corolla.

== Distribution and habitat ==
This species is present in both the United States and Mexico. In Mexico, it is found in the state of Baja California, from Miller's Landing in the central part of the state north to Tijuana. In the United States, this species is found in San Diego County, California, where it occurs in the southern part of the county, in the Otay River valley, the Tijuana Hills, and the Tijuana River valley. It was once present further north in San Diego County, notably in Rice Canyon and Greg Rogers Park in Chula Vista, but these occurrences have been extirpated to make way for residential development. In California, this species has a state rank of S1 (Critically Imperiled), and a CNPS Rare Plant Inventory rank of 2B.1 (Seriously threatened in California but common elsewhere).

This species is most often found growing in a riparian habitat. In the Tijuana River valley, it can be found in a cobbly ecotone with coastal sage scrub above with Baccharis thickets and southern willow scrub (Salix lasiolepis and associates) near the water. The former occurrence in Chula Vista at Greg Rogers Park has a substrate of Reiff fine sandy loam. In the Otay River area, this species is found on Holocene alluviums and river-wash.

== Gallery ==
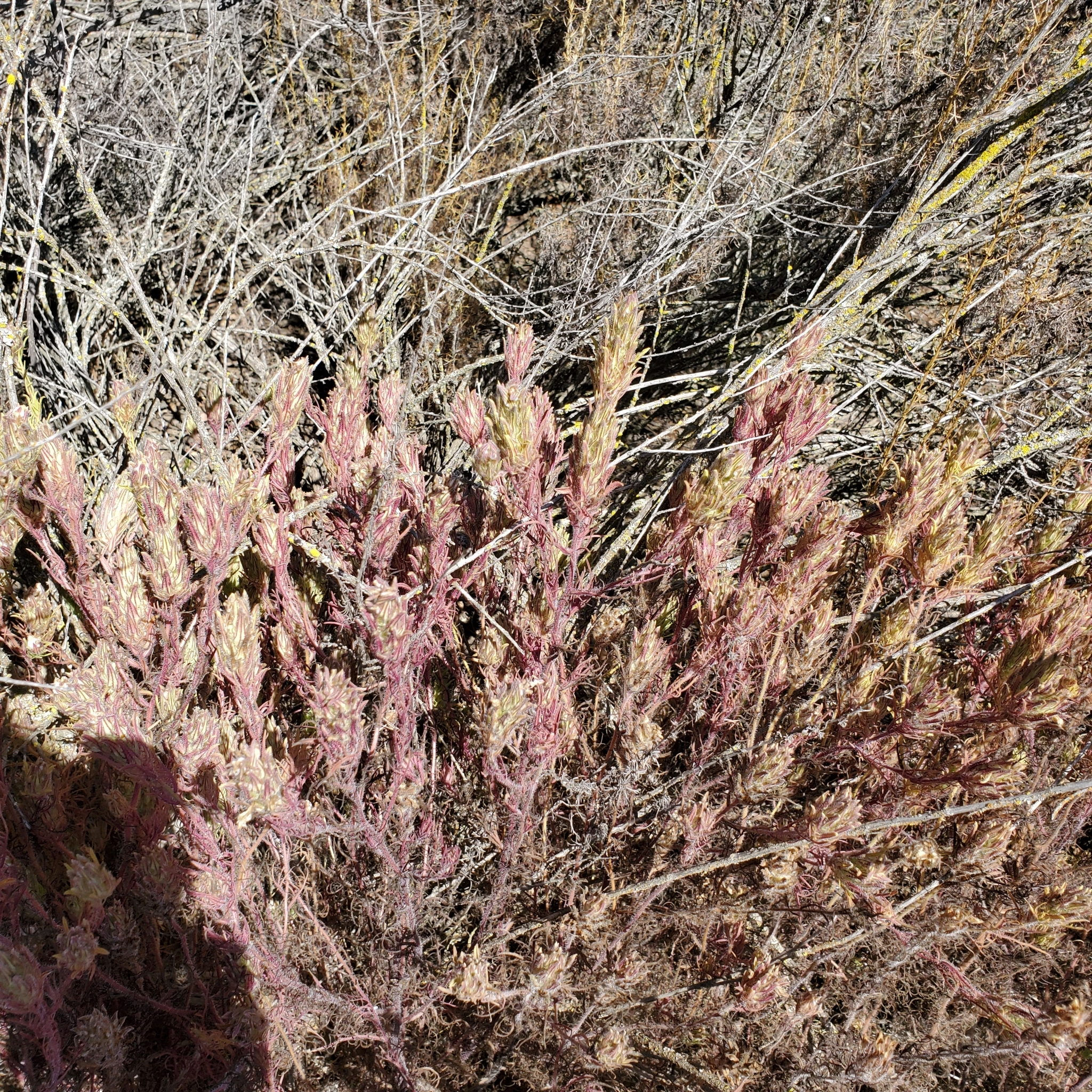
The plant in August

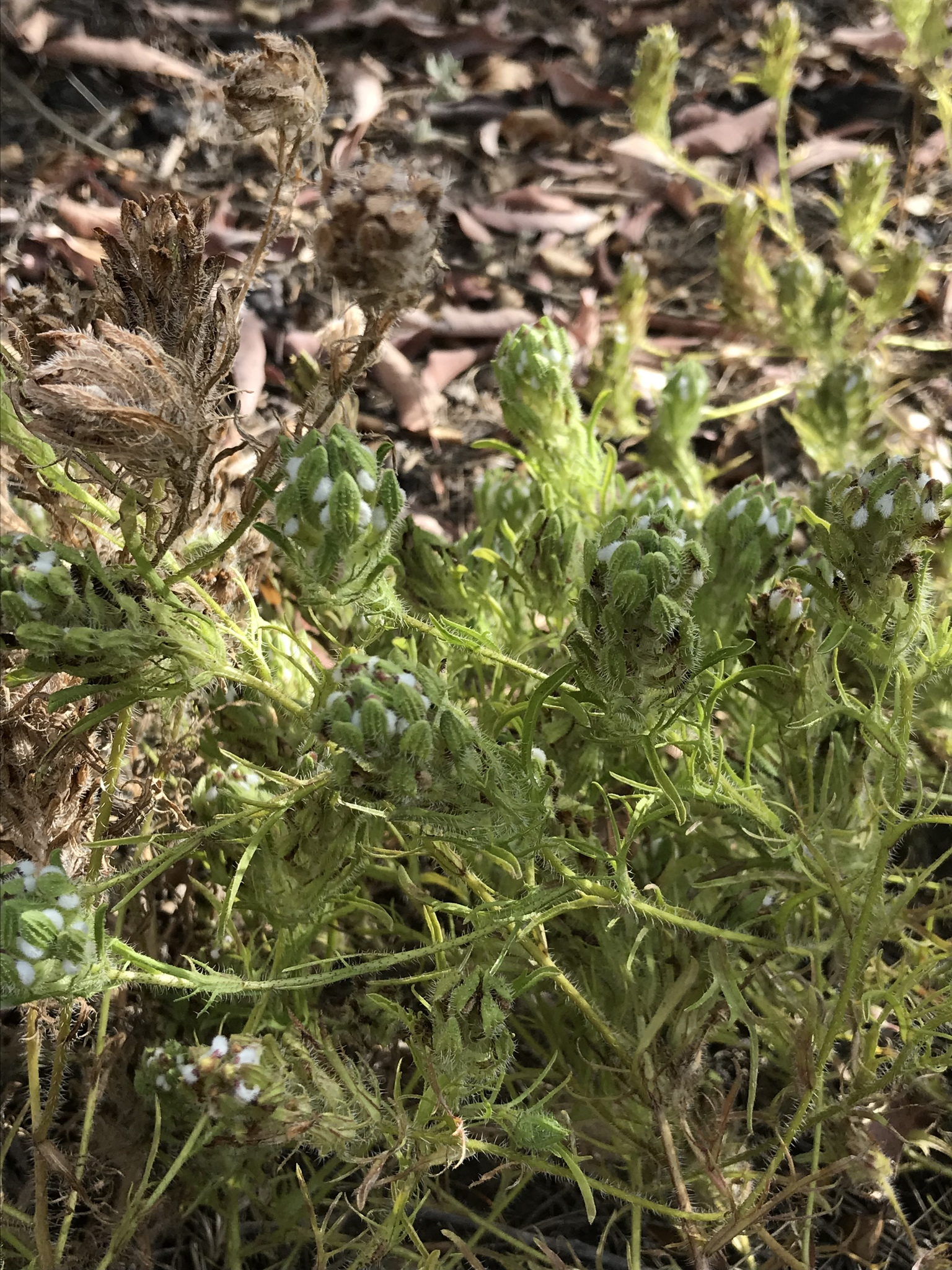
The plant with inflorescences

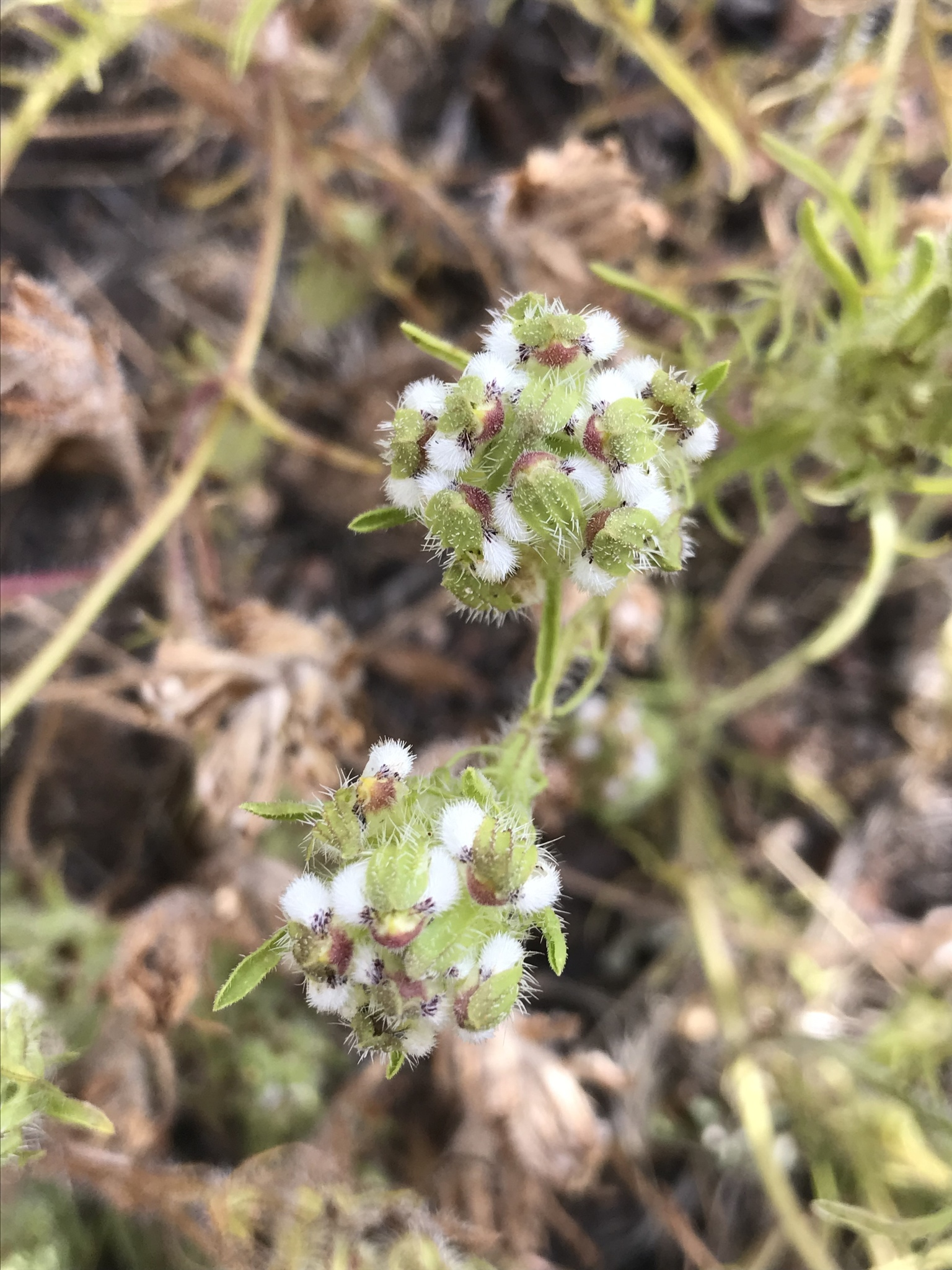
The inflorescence

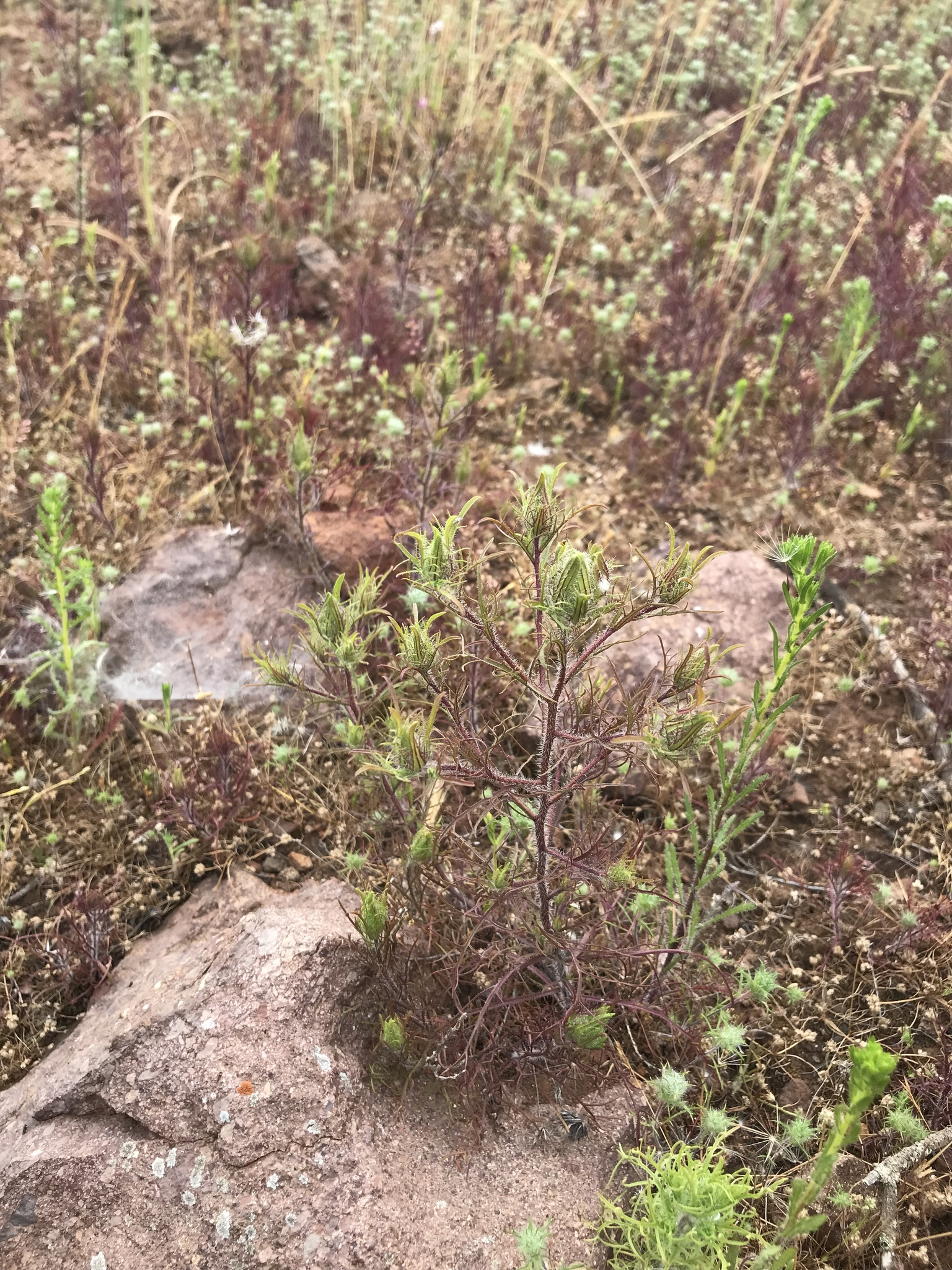
In habitat

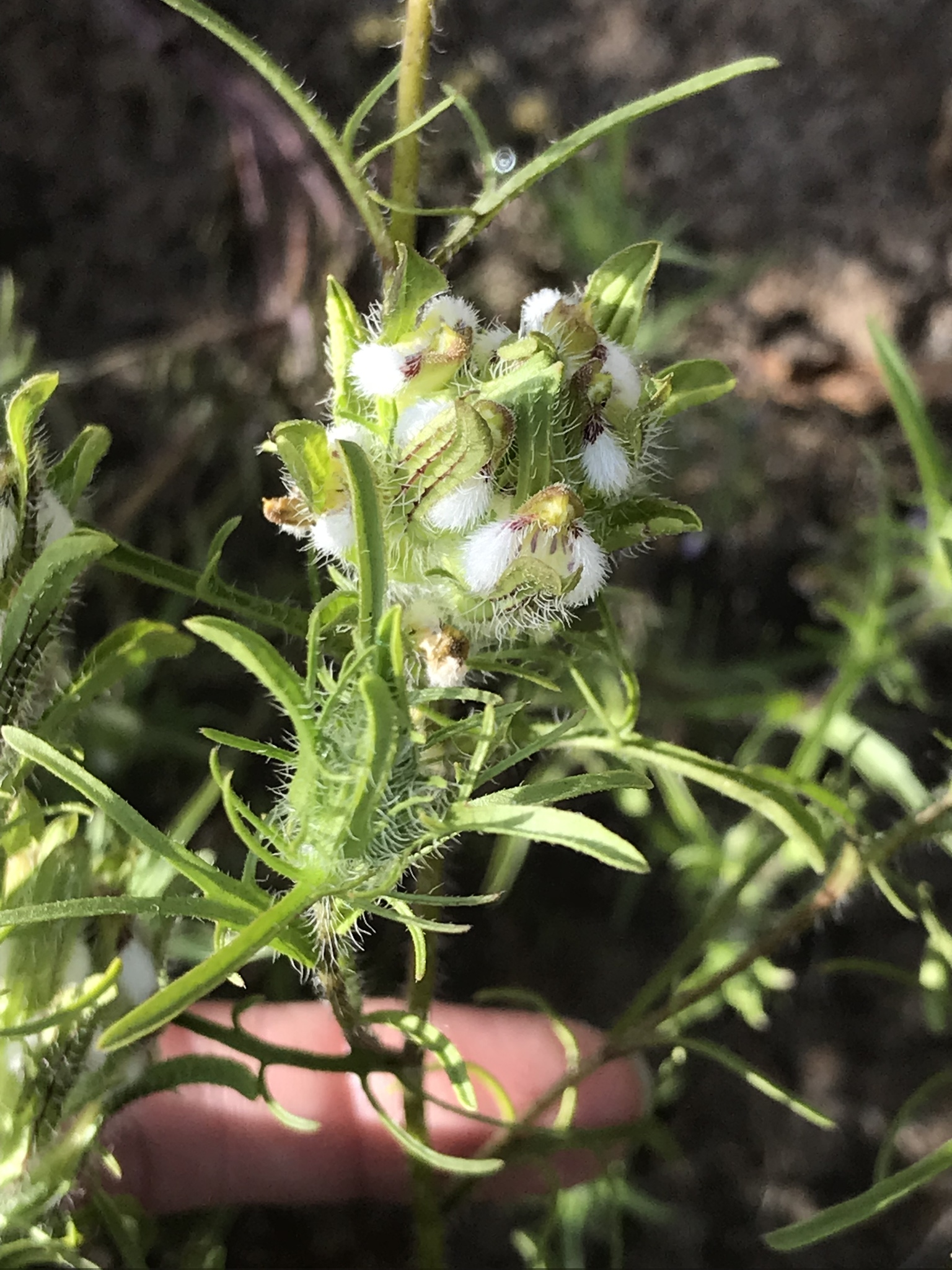
The inflorescence in a hand
