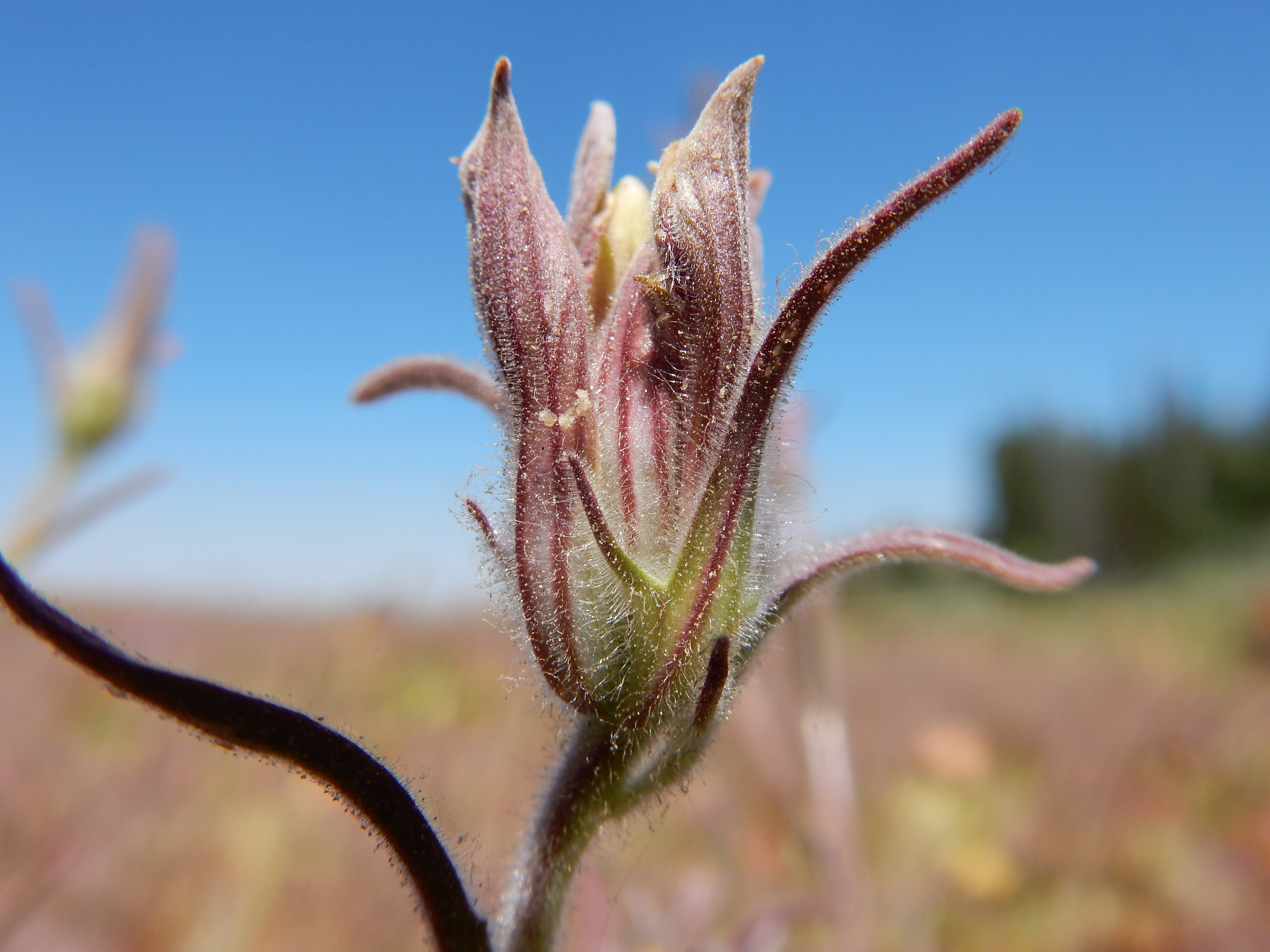

Conservation status
- Apparently Secure (NatureServe)

Scientific classification
- Kingdom: Plantae
- Clade: Tracheophytes
- Clade: Angiosperms
- Clade: Eudicots
- Clade: Asterids
- Order: Lamiales
- Family: Orobanchaceae
- Genus: Cordylanthus
- Species: C. capitatus

Binomial name
- Cordylanthus capitatus Nutt. ex Benth.

= Cordylanthus capitatus =

Species of flowering plant

Cordylanthus capitatus, the Yakima bird's-beak or clustered bird's-beak, is an uncommon plant of the Western U.S.

== Description ==
Annual with spreading branches, 10–50 cm, glaucous-green or grey-purple, densely glandular- and nonglandular-hairy. Stems paniculately branched; herbage green, pubescent (spreading-viscid and short-glandular-pilose) with long soft white hairs. Leaves of main stem alternate, deeply divided into 3 linear to thread-like segments, 20–40 mm; of the branches entire, few and remote. Inflorescences "leafy" 2—4 flowered small capitate spikes, 15–20 mm, head-like; bracts gland-tipped, of 2 kinds: those subtending the spike 4–7, linear-lanceolate, palmately divided (lobes 3 in lower ½), 10–20 mm; those subtending each flower entire or pinnately divided, 12–18 mm, elliptical, acute, entire, arched outward, purplish. Flower calyx purplish, 10–15 mm (shorter than the inner floral bract), tube 2–4 mm, tip bifid 2–3 mm deep, ca 1/3 of the calyx length; corolla 10–20 mm, erect, straight or nearly so, maroon, puberulent with reflexed hairs; lips subequal in length: galea pale, whitish, with a yellow-tip, finely pubescent and dark purple dorsally: lower lip shorter than upper: throat moderately inflated, 4–6 mm wide; stamens 2: filaments glabrous or nearly so, dilated above base and forming a U-shaped curve near the anther: anther sac 1 (with vestiges of a second), ciliate. Fruit is a capsule, slender, pointed, 8–10 mm long. Seeds 4–6, 2–2.5 mm, rather reniform, shallowly reticulate, rather smooth between nets.

== Distribution, habitat, and ecology ==
This plant is endemic to its range, an area stretching from central Washington, to the western edge of Montana, to the Warner Mountains of north-eastern California. It lives in open upland slopes and flats, within lower montane yellow pine forests and Great Basin juniper scrub, in dry, gravelly basaltic soil. It is usually associated with sagebrush, being a hemiparasite of that plant. Its elevational range is from 4,575 to 7,625 ft (2,324 m) above sea level.

== Conservation status and threats ==
California Native Plant Society List 2.2.

NatureServe Global Rank: G4

The threats facing Yaquima bird's-beak are not known at present.

== Field identification ==
Yakima bird's-beak flowers from July to early September. The flowers are purple. It is likely to be found in dry, gravelly soil derived from volcanic rocks, within a few feet of sagebrush.
