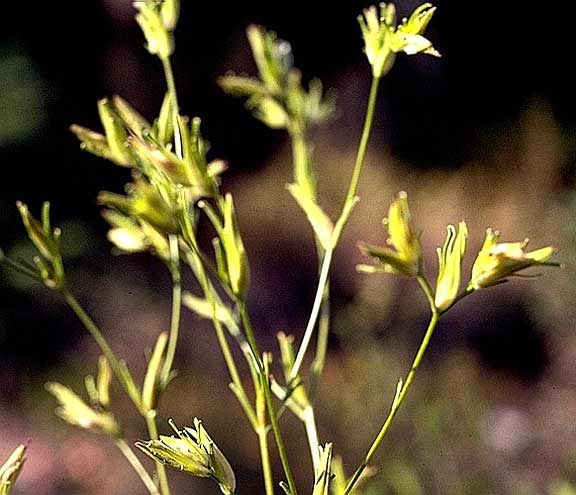
- subsp. pallescens

Scientific classification
- Kingdom: Plantae
- Clade: Tracheophytes
- Clade: Angiosperms
- Clade: Eudicots
- Clade: Asterids
- Order: Lamiales
- Family: Orobanchaceae
- Genus: Cordylanthus
- Species: C. tenuis

Binomial name
- Cordylanthus tenuis Gray

Synonyms
- Cordylanthus bolanderi Cordylanthus brunneus Cordylanthus capillaris Cordylanthus pallescens Cordylanthus viscidus

= Cordylanthus tenuis =

Species of flowering plant

Cordylanthus tenuis is a species of flowering plant in the family Orobanchaceae known by the common name slender bird's beak. It is native to the US states of California, Oregon, and Nevada, where it grows in woodland and forest. It erects a spindly stem which may exceed a meter in height with sparse narrow leaves a few centimeters long, and is sometimes sticky with glandular secretions. The plant is greenish and tinted with yellow or purple coloration. The stem branches at intervals and at the end of each branch is a cluster of one to several flowers. Each pocket-shaped flower is one to two centimeters long and about one wide, made up of fuzzy maroon lobes with white or yellow lips.

There are several subspecies, including:

- Cordylanthus tenuis subsp. barbatus - Fresno County slender bird's beak
- Cordylanthus tenuis subsp. brunneus - serpentine bird's beak
- Cordylanthus tenuis subsp. capillaris - Pennell's bird's beak
- Cordylanthus tenuis subsp. pallescens - pallid bird's beak
- Cordylanthus tenuis subsp. tenuis
- Cordylanthus tenuis subsp. viscidus
