= Cordylanthus nevinii =

Conservation status
- Vulnerable (NatureServe)

Scientific classification
- Kingdom: Plantae
- Clade: Tracheophytes
- Clade: Angiosperms
- Clade: Eudicots
- Clade: Asterids
- Order: Lamiales
- Family: Orobanchaceae
- Genus: Cordylanthus
- Species: C. nevinii

Binomial name
- Cordylanthus nevinii A.Gray

Species of flowering plant

Cordylanthus nevinii is a species of flowering plant in the family Orobanchaceae known by the common name Nevin's bird's beak. It is native to pine and oak forests and woodlands in southern California, western Arizona, and northern Baja California.

It is a red-tinted gray-green annual herb reaching 80 centimeters in maximum height. It is densely coated in glandular hairs. The sparse leaves are linear in shape and no more than 3 centimeters long. Flowers are solitary or appear in pairs or threes. At their bases are one or more bracts which may be divided into three narrow lobes with knobby tips. The flower is between 1 and 2 centimeters long. It is a fibrous white pouch sometimes veined with purple, enclosed in a beaklike calyx of sepals.
