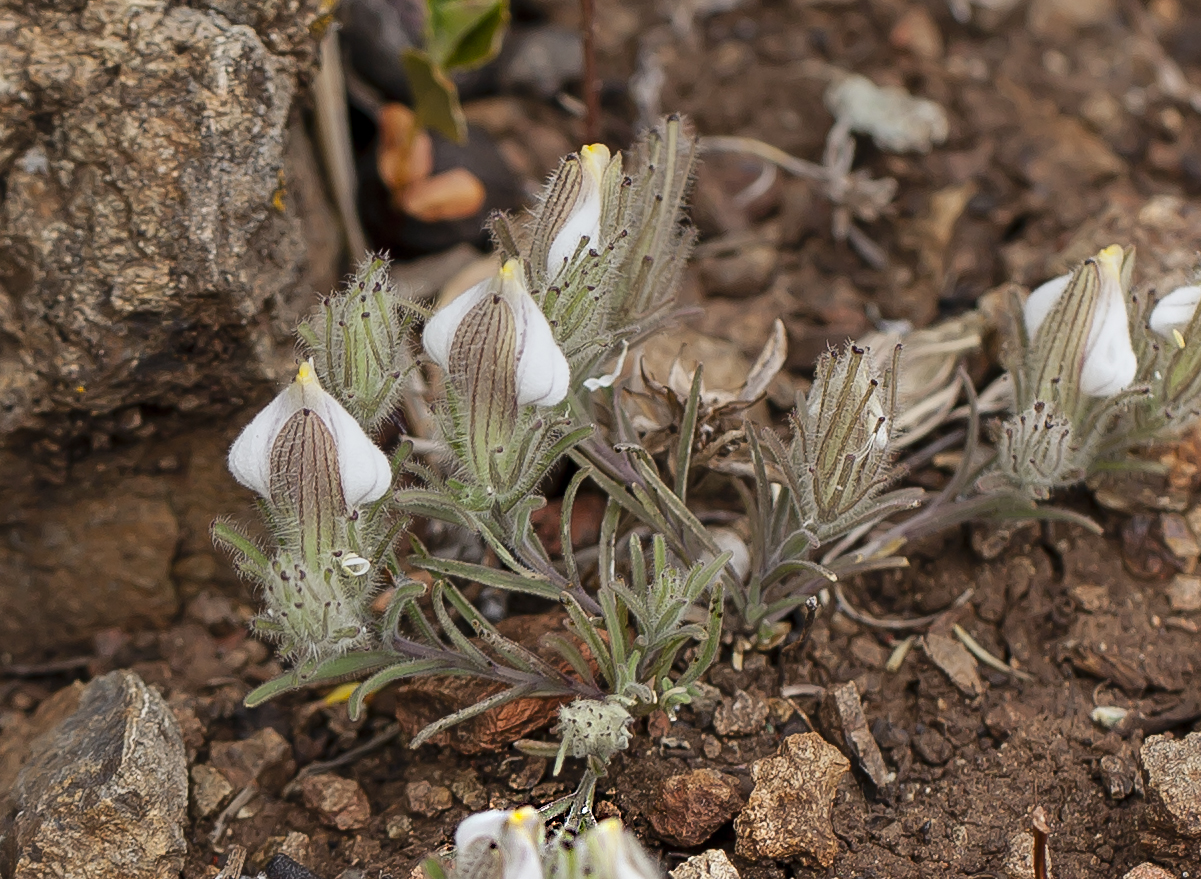

Conservation status
- Critically Imperiled (NatureServe)

Scientific classification
- Kingdom: Plantae
- Clade: Tracheophytes
- Clade: Angiosperms
- Clade: Eudicots
- Clade: Asterids
- Order: Lamiales
- Family: Orobanchaceae
- Genus: Cordylanthus
- Species: C. nidularius

Binomial name
- Cordylanthus nidularius J.T.Howell

= Cordylanthus nidularius =

Species of flowering plant

Cordylanthus nidularius is a rare species of flowering plant in the family Orobanchaceae known by the common name Mt. Diablo bird's beak.

== Distribution ==
The plant is endemic to Mount Diablo, in the northern Diablo Range within Contra Costa County, in the East Bay region of northern California.

It grows in chaparral habitats and only on serpentine soils, at elevations of 600–800 metres (2,000–2,600 ft).

== Description ==
Cordylanthus nidularius is a small annual herb. It foliage is red-tinted gray-green in color, and coated with glandular hairs and woolly fibers.

The flowers are each surrounded by 2 or 3 bracts divided into three narrow lobes up to 1.5 centimeters long. The corolla is a purple-streaked white pouch enclosed in a calyx of sepals. The bloom period is during July and August.

== Conservation ==
This is a state and California Native Plant Society listed Critically endangered species. It is currently known from only one occurrence on Mt. Diablo, which is threatened by trail construction and recreation, and possibly by fire suppression.
