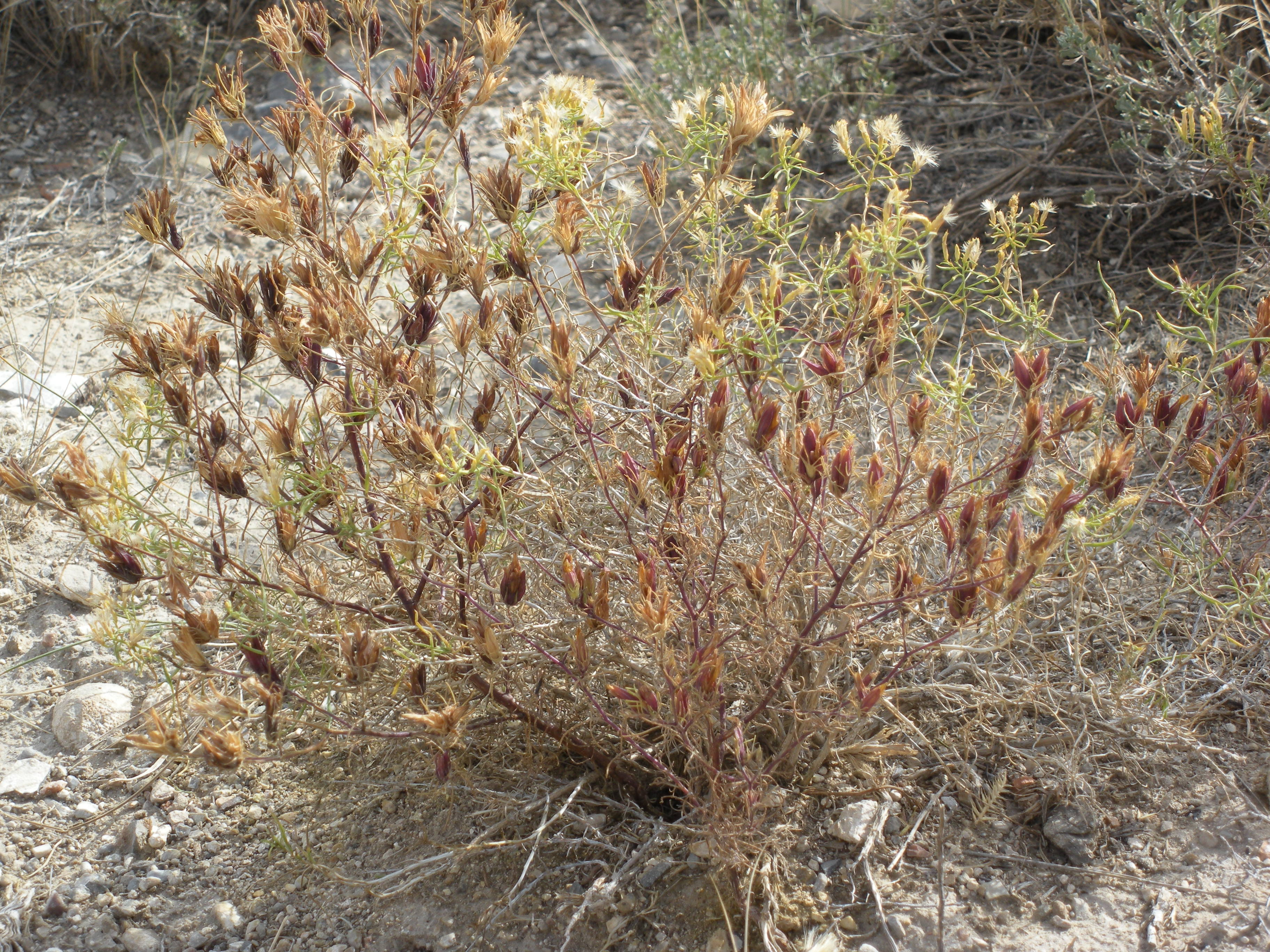
- Habit
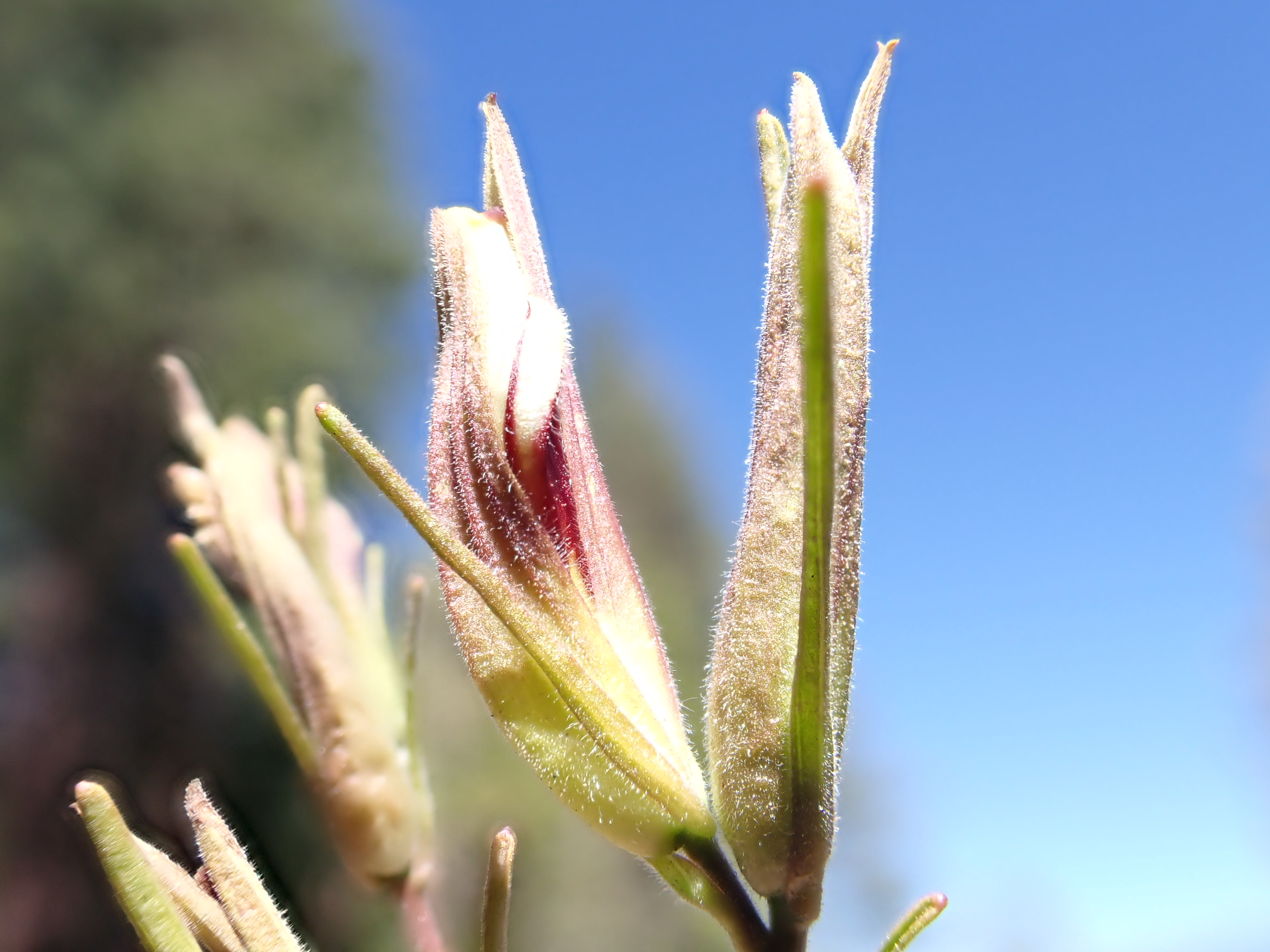
- Flowers

Conservation status
- Secure (NatureServe)

Scientific classification
- Kingdom: Plantae
- Clade: Tracheophytes
- Clade: Angiosperms
- Clade: Eudicots
- Clade: Asterids
- Order: Lamiales
- Family: Orobanchaceae
- Genus: Cordylanthus
- Species: C. ramosus

Binomial name
- Cordylanthus ramosus Nutt. ex Benth.

Synonyms
- Adenostegia ramosa

= Cordylanthus ramosus =

Bushy bird's beak

Plant species in the broomrape family

Cordylanthus ramosus is a species of flowering plant in the family Orobanchaceae known by the common name bushy bird's beak. It is native to the western United States where it grows in mountains and plateau, including the sagebrush of the Great Basin. It is an annual herb producing an erect, branching gray-green form, often tinted with red, becoming bushy at its most robust and appearing not unlike a sagebrush. The small leaves are narrow and linear or divided into several narrow, thready lobes. The inflorescence is a small spike of a few flowers surrounded by bracts which are linear or divided into narrow, thready lobes like the leaves. The bracts are faintly woolly and occasionally bristly in texture. The flower is one to two centimeters long with a hairy yellow pouch enclosed in darker, tougher reddish sepals. This plant had a number of historical medicinal uses for the Navajo people, who used it as an emetic.

== Description ==
Bushy bird's beak has stems that are covered in puberulent hairs, ones that are fine, short, and erect, though sometimes pilose, somewhat long and soft. They usually grow to between 10 and 30 centimeters (4 and 12 in), occasionally reaching as much as 90 cm (35 in). Its lower leaves are also covered in puberulent hairs and 1–4 cm long. They have three to five lobes, each 1–2 millimeters wide. Upper leaves are 1–1.5 cm long and just 0.5–1 mm wide and lack lobes.

== Taxonomy ==
Cordylanthus ramosus was scientifically described by George Bentham in 1846, based on an earlier incomplete description by Thomas Nuttall. It is part of the genus Cordylanthus within the family Orobanchaceae. It has four synonyms.

Table of Synonyms
Name	Year	Rank	Notes
Adenostegia ramosa (Nutt. ex Benth.) Greene	1891	species	≡ hom.
Adenostegia ramosa var. macrocephalus Kuntze	1891	variety	= het.
Cordylanthus ramosus var. puberulus J.F.Macbr.	1919	variety	= het.
Cordylanthus ramosus subsp. setosus Pennell	1947	subspecies	= het.
Notes: ≡ homotypic synonym ; = heterotypic synonym
