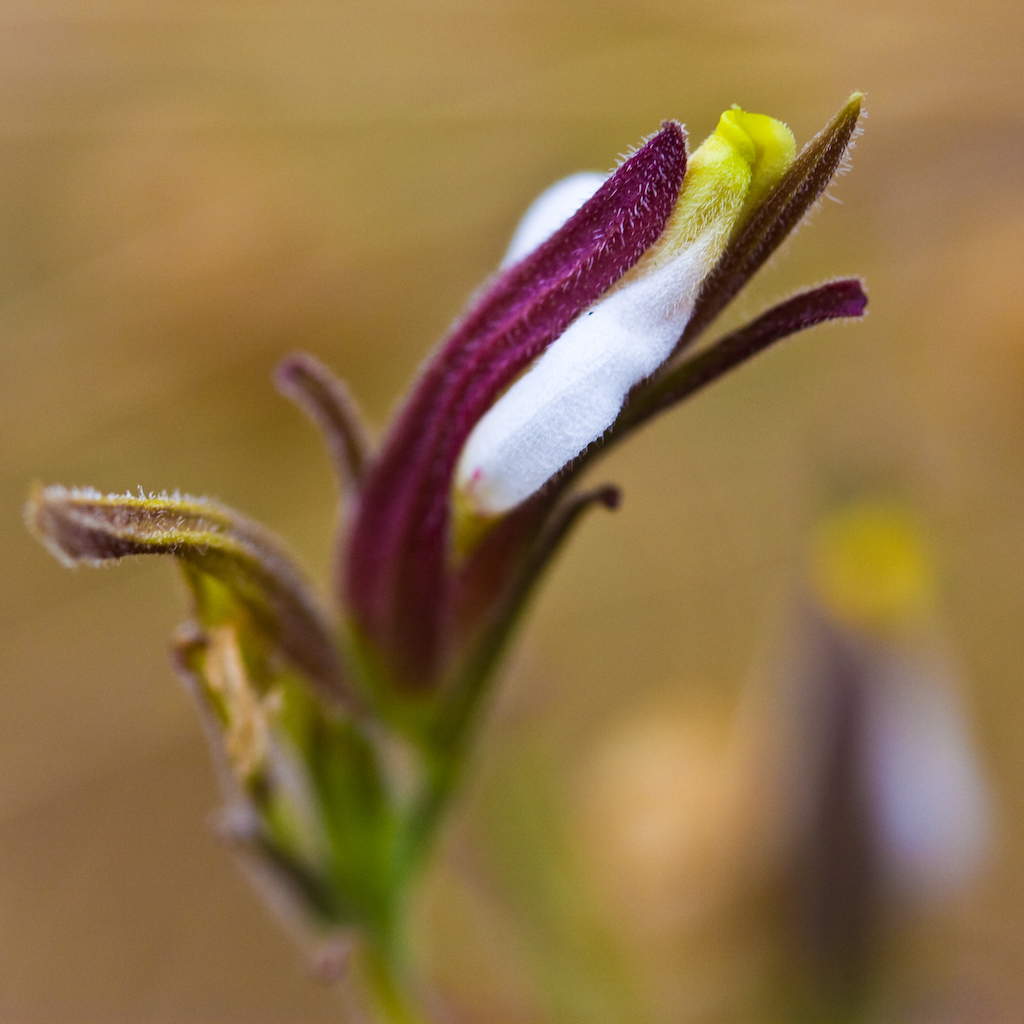

Scientific classification
- Kingdom: Plantae
- Clade: Tracheophytes
- Clade: Angiosperms
- Clade: Eudicots
- Clade: Asterids
- Order: Lamiales
- Family: Orobanchaceae
- Genus: Cordylanthus
- Species: C. pilosus

Binomial name
- Cordylanthus pilosus A.Gray

= Cordylanthus pilosus =

Species of flowering plant

Cordylanthus pilosus is a species of flowering plant in the family Orobanchaceae known by the common name hairy bird's beak. It is endemic to the mountain ranges and foothills of northern California, where it grows in woodland and chaparral habitat, often on serpentine soils. There are three subspecies, each mainly limited to a different section of mountains. In general this annual herb is erect and branching, reaching a maximum height anywhere between 20 centimeters and 1.2 meters. It is purple-tinted gray-green in color and usually quite hairy in texture, the hairs sometimes associated with sticky glands. The branches have sparse tufts of small linear leaves. The flowers of the inflorescence have bracts which may be linear in shape or lobed, each lobe knobby or notched. The flower is up to 2 centimeters long and has a whitish pouch marked with yellow and purple enclosed in hairy sepals.

Cordylanthus pilosus has three subspecies: subsp. trifidus in the Sierra Nevada, subsp. pilosus in the Coast Ranges, and subsp. hansenii in the Cascade Ranges and the Sierra Nevada.
