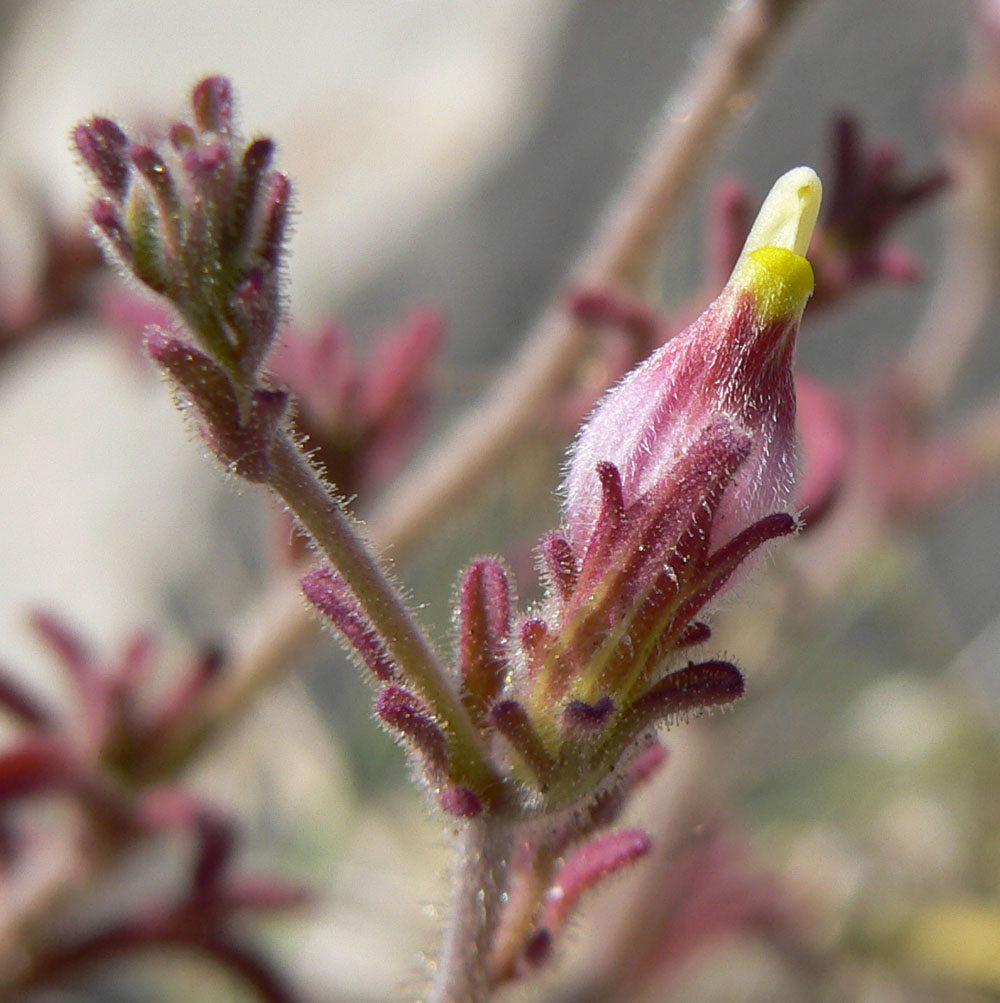
- Cordylanthus parviflorus growing on Turtlehead Peak, southern Nevada

Conservation status
- Apparently Secure (NatureServe)

Scientific classification
- Kingdom: Plantae
- Clade: Tracheophytes
- Clade: Angiosperms
- Clade: Eudicots
- Clade: Asterids
- Order: Lamiales
- Family: Orobanchaceae
- Genus: Cordylanthus
- Species: C. parviflorus

Binomial name
- Cordylanthus parviflorus (Ferris) Wiggins

= Cordylanthus parviflorus =

Species of flowering plant

Cordylanthus parviflorus is a species of flowering plant in the family Orobanchaceae known by the common name purple bird's beak. It is native to the western United States where it grows in several types of habitat, including the sagebrush steppe of the Great Basin. It is an annual herb, red-tinted gray-green in color, and hairy, glandular, and sticky in texture. It grows 20 to 60 centimeters tall. The inflorescence bears flowers accompanied by hairy, lobed red-green bracts. The flower is up to 2 centimeters long, made up of a dark-veined pink pouch enveloped in darker sepals.
