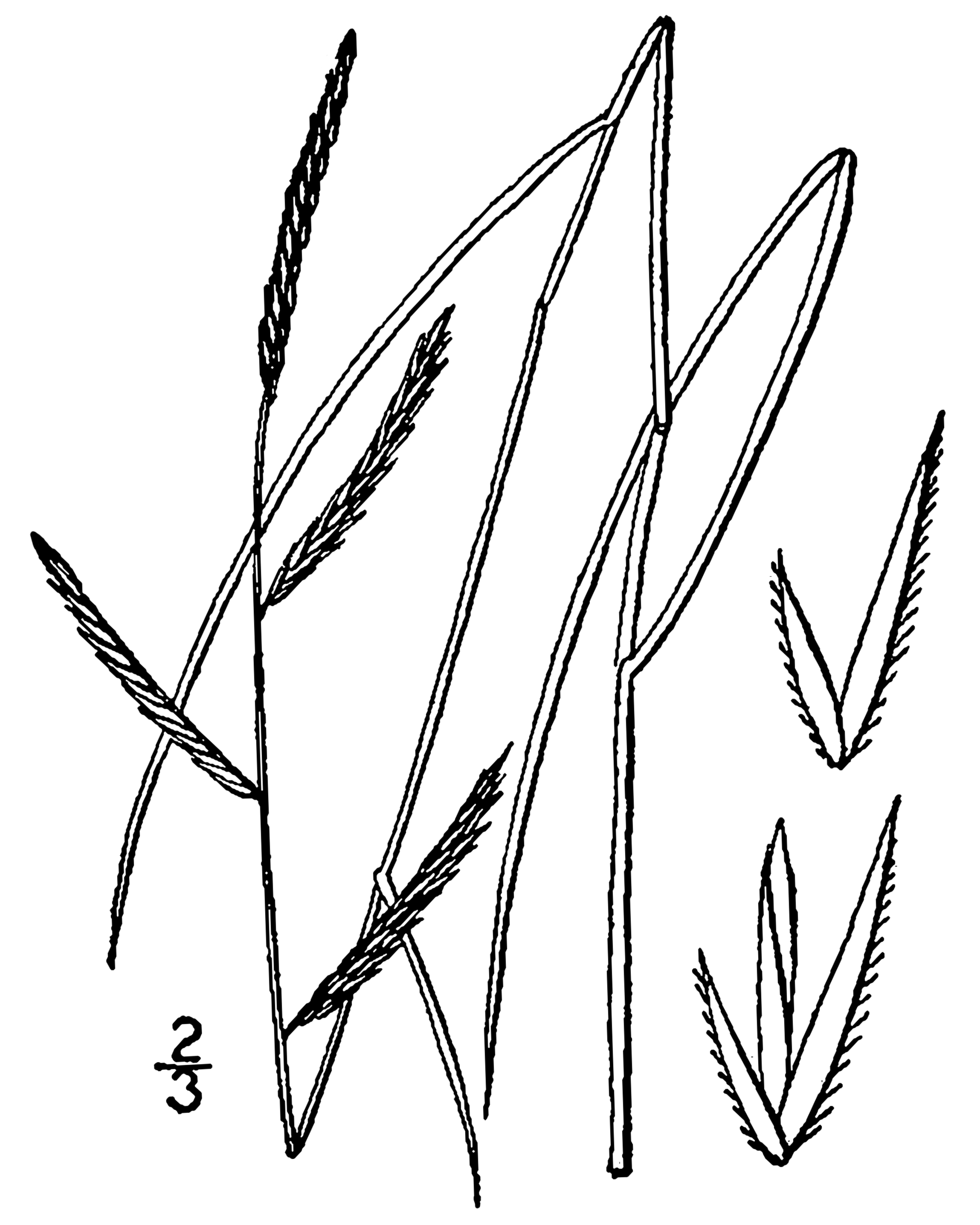
- 1913 illustration

Scientific classification
- Kingdom: Plantae
- Clade: Tracheophytes
- Clade: Angiosperms
- Clade: Monocots
- Clade: Commelinids
- Order: Poales
- Family: Poaceae
- Subfamily: Chloridoideae
- Genus: Sporobolus
- Section: Spartina
- Species: S. pumilus

Binomial name
- Sporobolus pumilus (Roth) P.M.Peterson & Saarela

Synonyms
- List: Spartina pumila Roth; Dactylis patens Aiton; Limnetis juncea (Michx.) Rich.; Limnetis juncea var. monogyna Curtis; Spartina americana Roth ex Trin.; Spartina juncea (Michx.) Willd.; Spartina juncea subvar. americana St.-Yves; Spartina juncea var. patens (Aiton) St.-Yves; Spartina patens (Aiton) Muhl; Spartina patens var. juncea (Michx.) Hitchc.; Spartina patens var. monogyna (Curtis) Fernald; Spartina platensis Mez ex St.-Yves; Trachynotia juncea Michx.; Trachynotia patens (Aiton) Poir.

= Sporobolus pumilus =

Saltmeadow cordgrass

Species of plant

Sporobolus pumilus, the saltmeadow cordgrass, also known as salt hay, is a species of cordgrass native to the Atlantic coast of the Americas, from Newfoundland south along the eastern United States to the Caribbean and north-eastern Mexico. It was reclassified after a taxonomic revision in 2014, but the older name, Spartina patens, may still be found in use. It can be found in marshlands in other areas of the world as an introduced species and often a harmful noxious weed or invasive species.

It is a perennial grass found in the upper areas of brackish coastal salt marshes. It is a slender and wiry plant that grows in thick mats 12 to 24 inches (30 to 60 cm) high, green in spring and summer, and turns light brown in late fall and winter. The stems are wispy and hollow, and the leaves roll inward and appear round. Because its stems are weak, the wind and water action can bend the grass, creating the appearance of a field of tufts and cowlicks. Like its relative smooth cordgrass, saltmeadow cordgrass produces flowers and seeds on only one side of the stalk. Flowers are a deep purple from June to October and turn brown in the winter months.

Saltmeadow cordgrass is found in high marsh zones where it is covered at times by high tides. Specialized cells are able to exclude salt from entering the roots, preventing the loss of fresh water. This grass is, however, less tolerant of saltwater than some other marsh grasses. It can also grow on beaches and can quickly recolonize an overwash zone.

A healthy salt marsh depends on the presence of plants such as salt hay grass and smooth cordgrass. These grasses provide rich habitat for crustaceans, mollusks, and birds, and serve as a major source of organic nutrients for the entire estuary. Mats of salt hay grass are inhabited by many small animals and are an important food source for ducks and seaside sparrows.

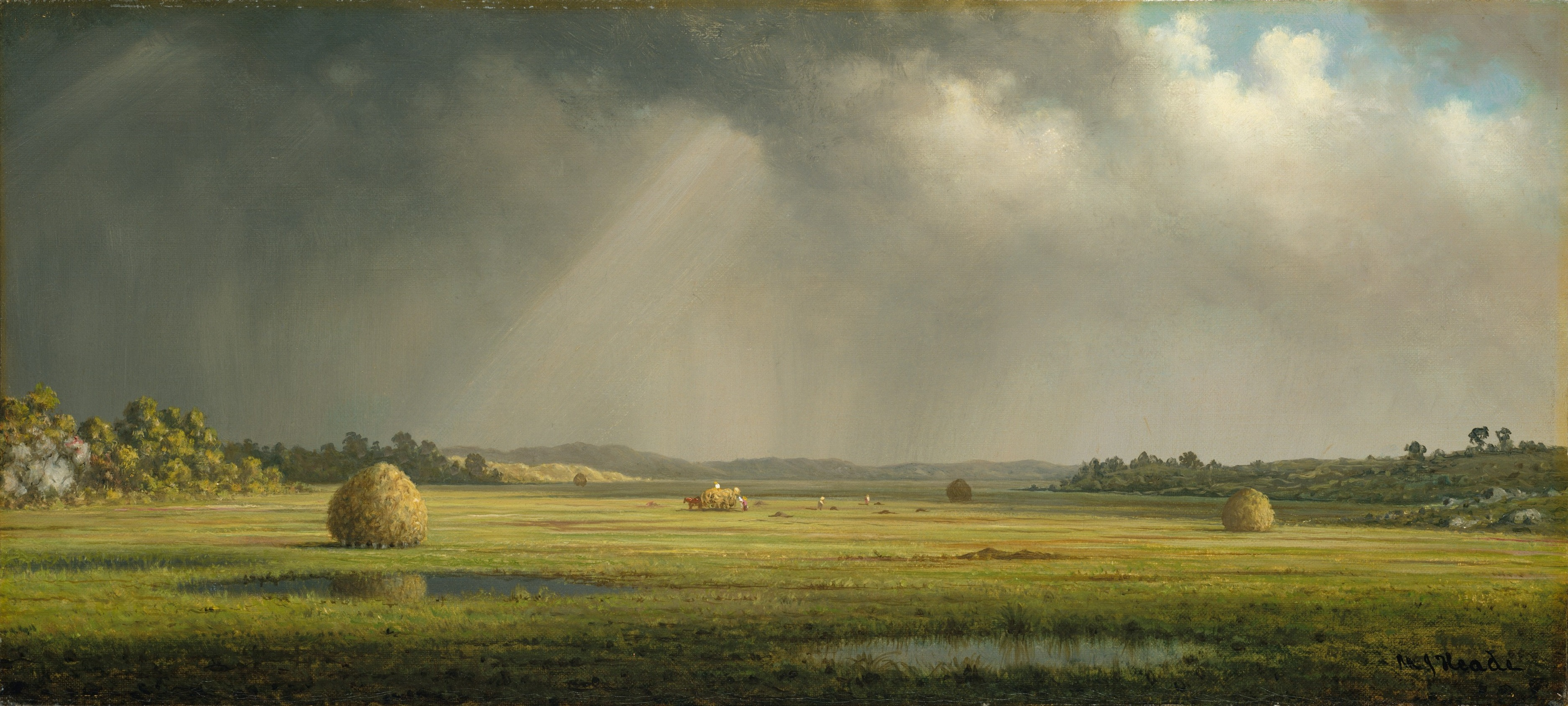
Newburyport Meadows, c. 1872–1878, by Martin Johnson Heade

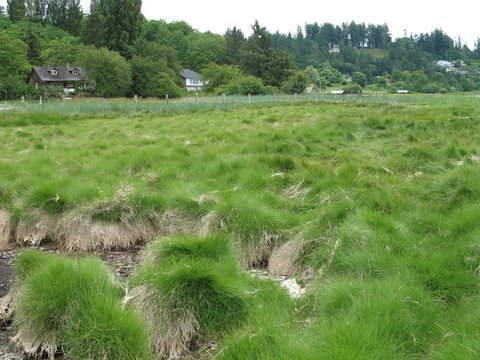
Sporobolus pumilus in a high marsh area

Saltmeadow cordgrass marshes serve as pollution filters and as buffers against flooding and shoreline erosion. During the colonial era, towns scattered from Narragansett Bay to the Gulf of Maine were often settled based on their proximity to salt marshes due to the importance of saltmeadow cordgrass for fodder. It was harvested for bedding and fodder for farm animals and for garden mulch. Before hay was baled and stored under cover, it was used to top the hay stacks in the fields.

Many of the salt marshes in Rhode Island have been severely affected by filling, development, and road construction. These alterations restrict tidal flow, often having a severe ecological impact on the marsh. Because saltmeadow cordgrass requires a salty, wet habitat, restricted tidal flow often dries out the marsh and encourages the growth of invasive freshwater plants. Saltmeadow and smooth cordgrasses are often out-competed for space by common reed in areas where human activity has disturbed or altered the marsh. Common reed is not as productive or beneficial to a salt marsh as cordgrass.

While this species is a key member of the salt marsh flora in its native habitat, it is known as a harmful invasive species in other parts of the world. It is a notorious pest in the San Francisco Bay Area, where it out-competes native plants such as soft bird's beak and alters the habitat of rare animals such as Ridgway's rail. This cordgrass was introduced to the estuaries of Oregon with shipments of oysters and has been dominating and crowding out native vegetation there. It has appeared in marshes on the Iberian Peninsula, where it threatens native plant biodiversity.
