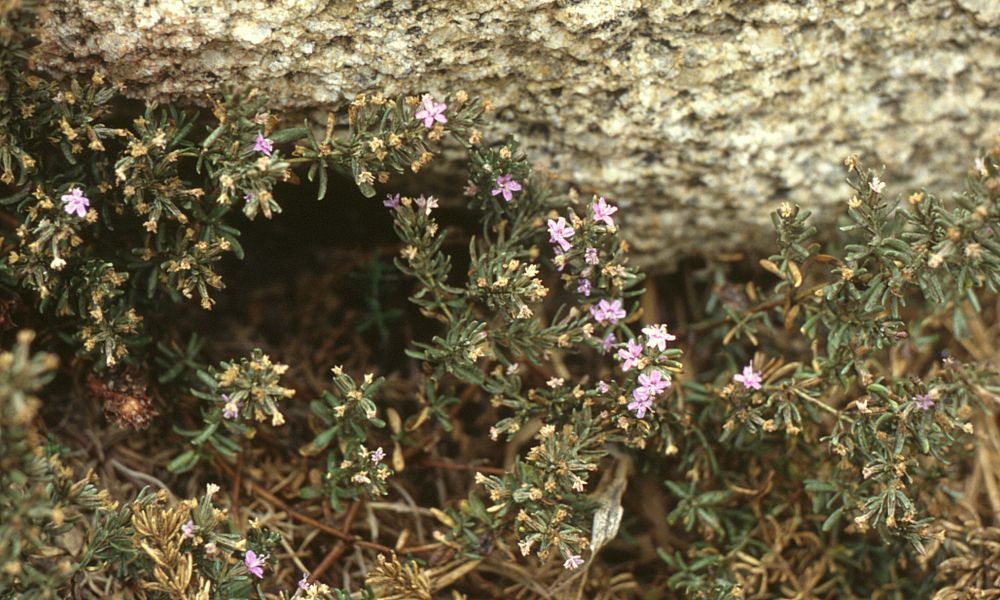

Conservation status
- Vulnerable (NatureServe)

Scientific classification
- Kingdom: Plantae
- Clade: Tracheophytes
- Clade: Angiosperms
- Clade: Eudicots
- Order: Caryophyllales
- Family: Frankeniaceae
- Genus: Frankenia
- Species: F. salina

Binomial name
- Frankenia salina (Molina) I.M. Johnst.

Synonyms
- List: Franca grandifolia (Cham. & Schltdl.) Greene; Frankenia berteroana Gay; Frankenia campestris (A.Gray) Tidestr.; Frankenia grandifolia Cham. & Schltdl.; Frankenia grandifolia subsp. campestris (A.Gray) A.E.Murray; Frankenia grandifolia var. campestris A.Gray; Frankenia micrantha Gay; Velezia latifolia Eschsch.

= Frankenia salina =

Species of aquatic plant

Frankenia salina, often called alkali heath or alkali seaheath, is a perennial herb native to California, Nevada, Mexico and Chile. It is uncommon even in the region where it is most likely to be found, just north of the San Francisco Bay Area.

It is a squat flowering bush that forms a twiggy thicket near beaches and coastal salt marshes. Its common name refers to its preference for alkaline soils as a halophyte. It has the ability to excrete salt as an adaptation for living in saline habitats. The flowers are pink or fuchsia in color.
