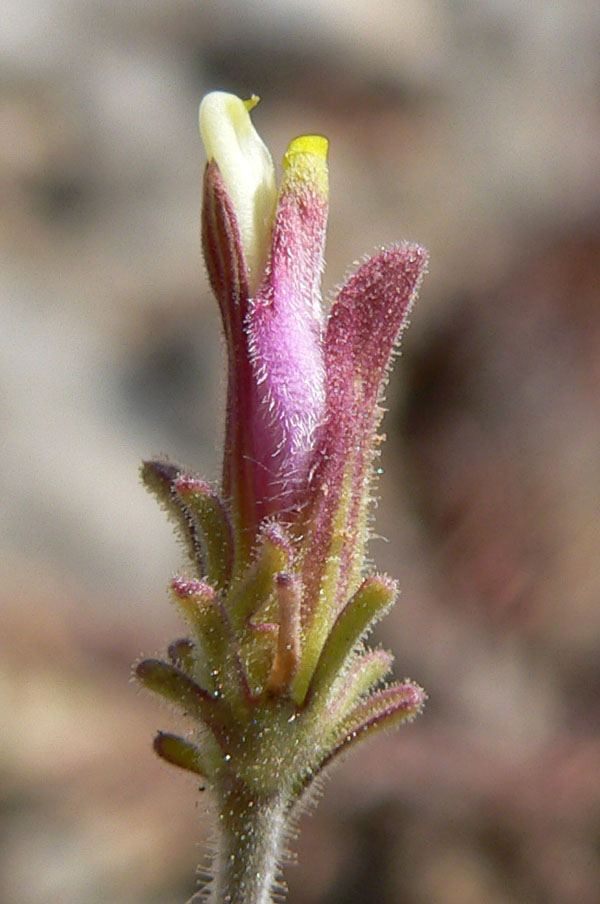
- Cordylanthus parviflorus

Scientific classification
- Kingdom: Plantae
- Clade: Tracheophytes
- Clade: Angiosperms
- Clade: Eudicots
- Clade: Asterids
- Order: Lamiales
- Family: Orobanchaceae
- Subtribe: Castillejinae
- Genus: Cordylanthus; Nutt. ex Benth.

Species
- 13 - see text

Synonyms
- Adenostegia Benth., pro parte

= Cordylanthus =

Genus of flowering plants in the broomrape family

Cordylanthus (lit. 'club-flower'), commonly known as bird's beaks, is a genus of parasitic plants in the broomrape family, Orobanchaceae. These western North American natives are sparse, weedy-looking annuals with long branching erect stems and little foliage, and many bear bird's-beak–shaped flowers. They are remarkable among the broomrapes for growing at searing temperatures in arid climates.

== Taxonomy ==
The first species known was Cordylanthus rigidus, which was described as Adenostegia rigida in 1836 by the well-known English plant taxonomist George Bentham. Thomas Nuttall was another English botanist, an explorer of the former British colony, renamed the United States of America, and its recently acquired French territories to the west, as well as the Mexican and British lands of the far west, returning to England in 1841. In one of Nuttall unpublished manuscripts Bentham found another four species, which Nuttall had described using the name Cordylanthus, despite this being a junior synonym, Bentham fancied this new name more, as he found the etymology to more accurately describe the morphology of the plants, thus in 1846 Bentham published these names in Augustin Pyramus de Candolle's Prodromus Systematis Naturalis Regni Vegetabilis. Bentham also used Nuttall's specific epithet, Cordylanthus filifolius instead of C. rigidus, it took until 1911 before Willis Linn Jepson noticed this was a nomen illegitimum and corrected the name.

In three different 1891 publications three different botanical taxonomists, the American Edward Lee Greene, the Austrian Richard Wettstein and the German Otto Kuntze, had all pointed out that Bentham's name had priority. Wettstein recognised 12 species of Adenostegia, following Gray's Flora of North America. Greene listed 15 species of Adenostegia in his work recognising taxonomic names with priority.

The Californian botanist Roxana Stinchfield Ferris followed these three authors in classifying the taxa in the genus Adenostegia in her 1918 monograph on the genus. She described a number of new species, bring the number of species up to 21. However, Ferris and many of the botanists in California were in that time in rebellion with the botanists in the rest of the world, and instead of following the International Code of Botanical Nomenclature, of which the first congress had met in Vienna in 1905, were following a provincial alternative method of nomenclature, known as the "American code". What Ferris neglected to mention in her monograph was that at the 1905 Vienna congress, the matter of the junior synonym Cordylanthus had been discussed, and it had been decided to conserve Nuttall's name.

In Harvard University James Francis Macbride was rather critical of Ferris's work, moved the species back to Cordylanthus the following year, furthermore sinking a number of her newly described taxa into synonymy.

In his revisions of the genus in 1947 and 1951 the Scrophulariaceae expert (these plants were classified in that botanical family at the time) Francis W. Pennell expanded the genus with many new species, so that there were approximately 35 species after he was done.

In 1976 Tsan-iang Chuang and Lawrence R. Heckard began to revise the genus, being the first to do so since Pennell. They severely cut the number of species, down to 18, mostly by synonymising Pennell's many new species.

The next authors to revise the genus were David C. Tank, John Mark Egger and Richard G. Olmstead in 2009, using molecular phylogenetic work to tease out the relationships. These authors removed one species to a new monotypic genus Dicranostegia, and moved another four species to the new genus Chloropyron.

=== Systematics ===
Asa Gray was the first botanist to subdivide the genus Cordylanthus in 1868 and 1886. Although his infrageneric taxa were unranked, he recognised four groups. Wettstein, recognising it under the name Adenostegia, in 1891 divided the genus into four sections in Adolf Engler's classic Die natürlichen Pflanzenfamilien:

Anisocheila, Euadenostegia (Gray's tautonymic Adenostegia, renamed), Dicranostegia and Hemistegia (split into two unnamed subsections)

By 1918 Ferris recognised the sections

Anisocheila, Euadenostegia, Chloropyron, Dicranostegia, Kingia and Pringlea.

=== Etymology ===
The name Cordylanthus was derived from the combination of the Greek words kordúlē (κορδύλη), meaning 'club, cudgel', and ánthos (ἄνθος), meaning 'flower'. The name is descriptive, and refers to the shape of the inflorescences.

The genus's initial name, Adenostegia, was only descriptive of its first species, deriving from Greek adḗn (ἀδήν 'gland') and stégē (στέγη 'covering'), hence the genus being renamed within ten years of its initial publication.

== Description ==
Bird's beaks are generally sparse, weedy-looking annuals with long branching erect stems and little foliage, and many bear bird's-beak–shaped flowers. All are hemiparasites, meaning they rely on a host plant for some of their nutrients, inserting haustoria into their host's roots to get nutrients. They target various trees, shrubs, and herbaceous perennials.

They're remarkable among the broomrape family for growing at searing temperatures in arid climates. Also unique to the genus is the morphological diversity of its inflorescence structures, which have evolved into some four forms in Cordylanthus, contrasted to almost all other broomrape genera having only one form.

== Distribution ==
The state of California holds the greatest biodiversity of bird's beak and the greatest number of endemic species. The genus is restricted to western North America.

== Species ==
As of 2009, when the newest revision of the genus was published, thirteen species were recognised in this genus:

- Cordylanthus capitatus – Yakima bird's beak
- Cordylanthus eremicus – desert bird's beak
- Cordylanthus kingii
- Cordylanthus laxiflorus
- Cordylanthus nevinii – Nevin's bird's beak
- Cordylanthus nidularius – Mt. Diablo bird's beak
- Cordylanthus parviflorus – purple bird's beak
- Cordylanthus pilosus – hairy bird's beak
- Cordylanthus pringlei
- Cordylanthus ramosus – bushy bird's beak
- Cordylanthus rigidus – stiffbranch bird's beak
- Cordylanthus tenuis – slender bird's beak
- Cordylanthus wrightii – Wright's bird's beak
