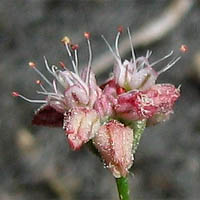

Conservation status
- Apparently Secure (NatureServe)

Scientific classification
- Kingdom: Plantae
- Clade: Embryophytes
- Clade: Tracheophytes
- Clade: Angiosperms
- Clade: Eudicots
- Order: Caryophyllales
- Family: Polygonaceae
- Genus: Eriogonum
- Species: E. angulosum

Binomial name
- Eriogonum angulosum Benth.

= Eriogonum angulosum =

Species of wild buckwheat

Eriogonum angulosum is a species of wild buckwheat known by the common name anglestem buckwheat.

The plant is native to central California, Southern California, and Baja California where it is common to abundant in many types of habitat, from chaparral and oak woodlands to sagebrush and the Mojave Desert sands.

== Description ==
Eriogonum angulosum is an annual herb producing a spreading to erect stem up to 90 centimetres (35 in) tall. The leaves are located about the base of the plant and on the lower stem. They are lance-shaped and usually quite woolly in texture.

Most of the stem is made up of the inflorescence, an angled, grooved cyme with bell-shaped clusters of flowers at the tips of the branches. The individual flowers are only about a millimeter long and are white to pink-tinged in color with protruding stamens.

== Taxonomy ==
In 1836 botanist George Bentham scientifically described a new species in the Eriogonum genus, which he named Eriogonum angulosum. Along with the rest of the genus it is classified in the Polygonaceae family. Although the species has no accepted varieties, it has three that are botanical synonyms.

Table of Synonyms
Name	Year	Rank	Notes
Eriogonum angulosum var. flabellatum Gand.	1906	variety	= het.
Eriogonum angulosum var. patens Gand.	1906	variety	= het.
Eriogonum angulosum var. pauciflorum Gand.	1906	variety	= het.
Eriogonum angulosum subsp. typicum S.Stokes	1936	subspecies	≡ hom., not validly publ.
Notes: ≡ homotypic synonym; = heterotypic synonym
