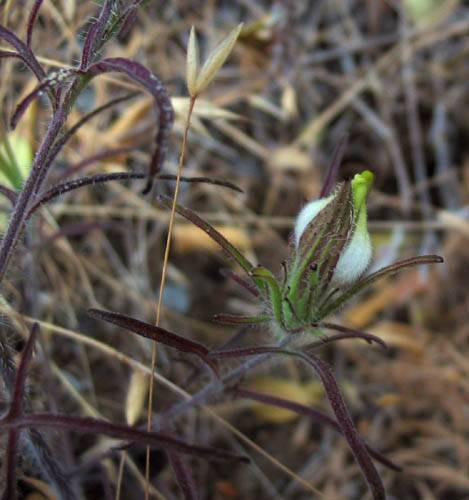

Conservation status
- Secure (NatureServe)

Scientific classification
- Kingdom: Plantae
- Clade: Tracheophytes
- Clade: Angiosperms
- Clade: Eudicots
- Clade: Asterids
- Order: Lamiales
- Family: Orobanchaceae
- Genus: Cordylanthus
- Species: C. rigidus

Binomial name
- Cordylanthus rigidus (Benth.) Jeps.

= Cordylanthus rigidus =

Species of flowering plant

Cordylanthus rigidus is a species of flowering plant in the family Orobanchaceae known by the common name stiffbranch bird's beak.

It is native to California and northern Baja California, where it grows in many types of habitat from coastal flats to high inland mountains. This is a hairy annual herb growing to maximum heights anywhere from 30 centimeters to 1.5 meters. There are at least four subspecies and possibly natural varieties not distinct enough to be considered subspecies. There is great variety in the appearance of the plant. The stem and foliage vary in color from greenish to yellows and reds; like other members of its family this species is a parasite on other plants so it does not rely entirely on green chlorophyll to produce its own nutrients. Its leaves are linear in shape and 1 to 4 centimeters long. The edges may roll in. The loose inflorescence produces solitary flowers on long stalks. Each hair-covered flower is shaped like a conical bird's beak with leaflike, pointed outer and inner bracts. Tucked inside is the pouched white flower. The whole unit is up to 2 centimeters long. The fruit is a capsule containing dark brown seeds one or two millimeters long. A subspecies, seaside bird's beak—Cordylanthus rigidus littoralis—is listed by the State of California as endangered.
