= Amos Arthur Heller =

American botanist (1867–1944)

- Born: March 21, 1867; Danville, Pennsylvania U.S.
- Died: May 19, 1944 (aged 77); Vacaville, California U.S.
- Education: Franklin & Marshall College
- Spouse: Emily Gertrude Heller
- Scientific career
- Fields: Botany
- Author abbrev. (botany): A.Heller

Amos Arthur Heller (March 21, 1867 – May 19, 1944) was an American botanist.

== Early life ==
Heller was born in Danville, Pennsylvania.

In 1892, Heller received a Bachelor of Arts degree from Franklin & Marshall College. In 1897, he received a Master's degree in Botany from Franklin & Marshall College.

Starting with 1892, he issued more than 15 specimen series with printed labels which resemble exsiccatae, among others Plants of Porto Rico and Plants of the Hawaiian Islands. Emily Gertrude Halbach (Emily Gertrude Heller) curated and co-edited at least eight of these series, e.g., Flora of Central Pennsylvania.

== Career ==
From 1896 to 1898, Heller was a professor of Botany at the University of Minnesota.

From 1898 to 1899, Heller worked on the Vanderbilt Expedition to Puerto Rico under the auspices of the New York Botanical Garden.

Starting in 1905, Heller was a professor of Botany at the California Academy of Sciences in San Francisco, California.

After moving to California, Heller and his wife, Emily Gertrude Heller, founded the botanical journal Muhlenbergia and Heller continued to edit that journal until 1915. He also obtained an impressive collection from Puerto Rico.

== Personal life ==
In 1896, Heller married Emily Gertrude Heller (née Halbach). She frequently collaborated with him both in the collection of specimens as well as illustrating his numerous publications.
