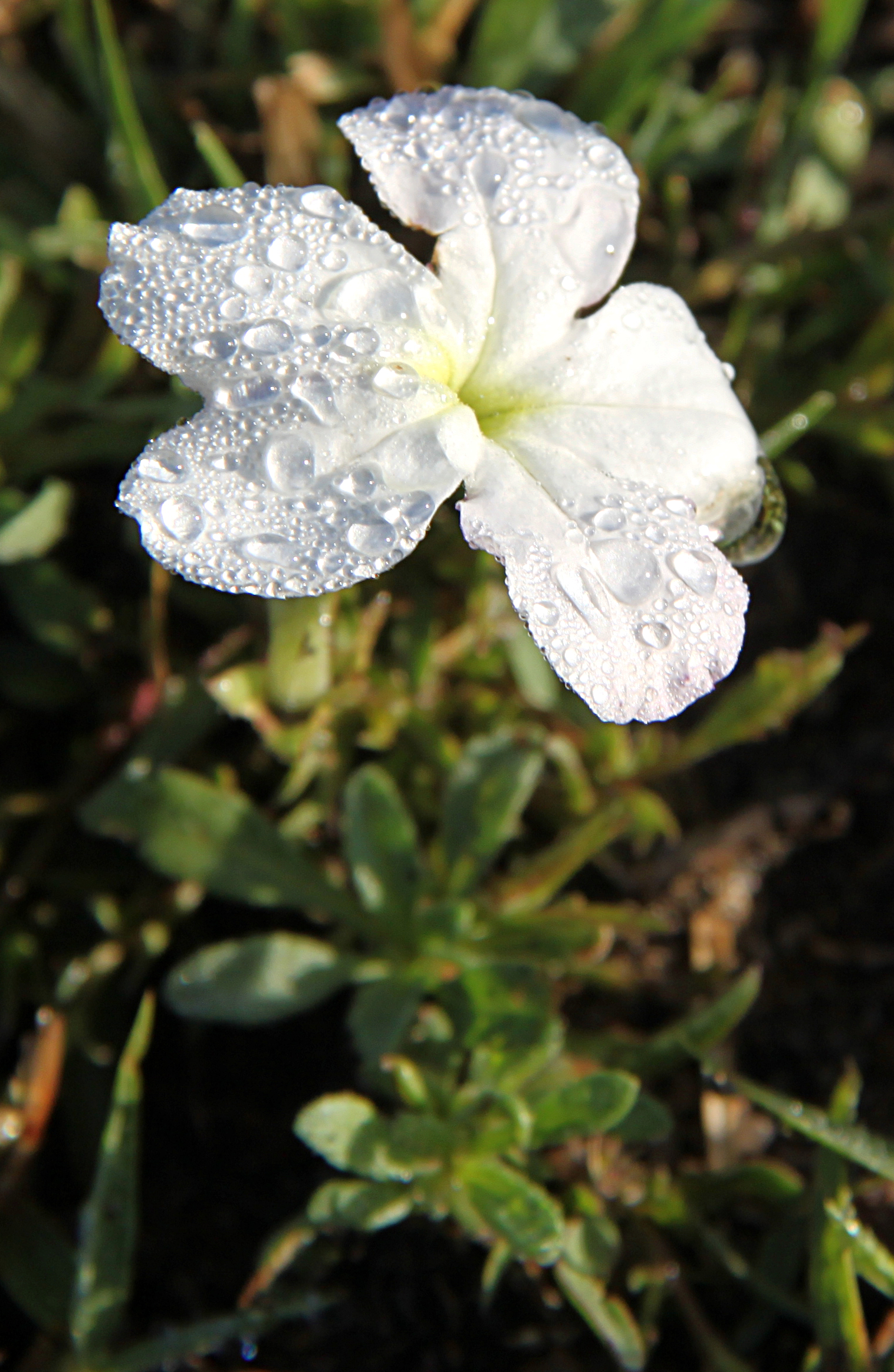

Scientific classification
- Kingdom: Plantae
- Clade: Tracheophytes
- Clade: Angiosperms
- Clade: Eudicots
- Clade: Asterids
- Order: Lamiales
- Family: Orobanchaceae
- Tribe: Buchnereae
- Genus: Cycnium
- Species: C. tubulosum

Binomial name
- Cycnium tubulosum (L.f.) Engl.

Synonyms
- Gerardia tubulosa, Rhamphicarpa tubulosa; C. aquaticum, R. aquatica; R. curviflora, R. tubulosa var. curviflora; C. hamatum, R. hamata; C. heuglinii, R. heuglinii; R. montana; C. questieauxianum; C. serratum, R. serrata

= Cycnium tubulosum =

Vlei ink-flower

Genus of flowering plants in the broomrape family

Cycnium tubulosum, also known as the vlei ink-flower and the tissue paper flower, is a slender hemiparasitic perennial plant of the broomrape family. Its range includes much of southern and eastern Africa, from South Africa to Ethiopia, including Madagascar. It has creeping, straggling or upright stems, with few narrow, entire leaves and erect, white or pinkish, slightly zygomorph flowers on a long tube, with five lobes, reminiscent of a Phlox flower. It may not always be fully dependent on the supply of minerals by other plants, but usually makes connections with the roots of grasses. It can be found in moist, short grasslands, reaching altitudes of about 1,550 m (5,090 ft). Its conservation status in South Africa is "least concern".

== Description ==
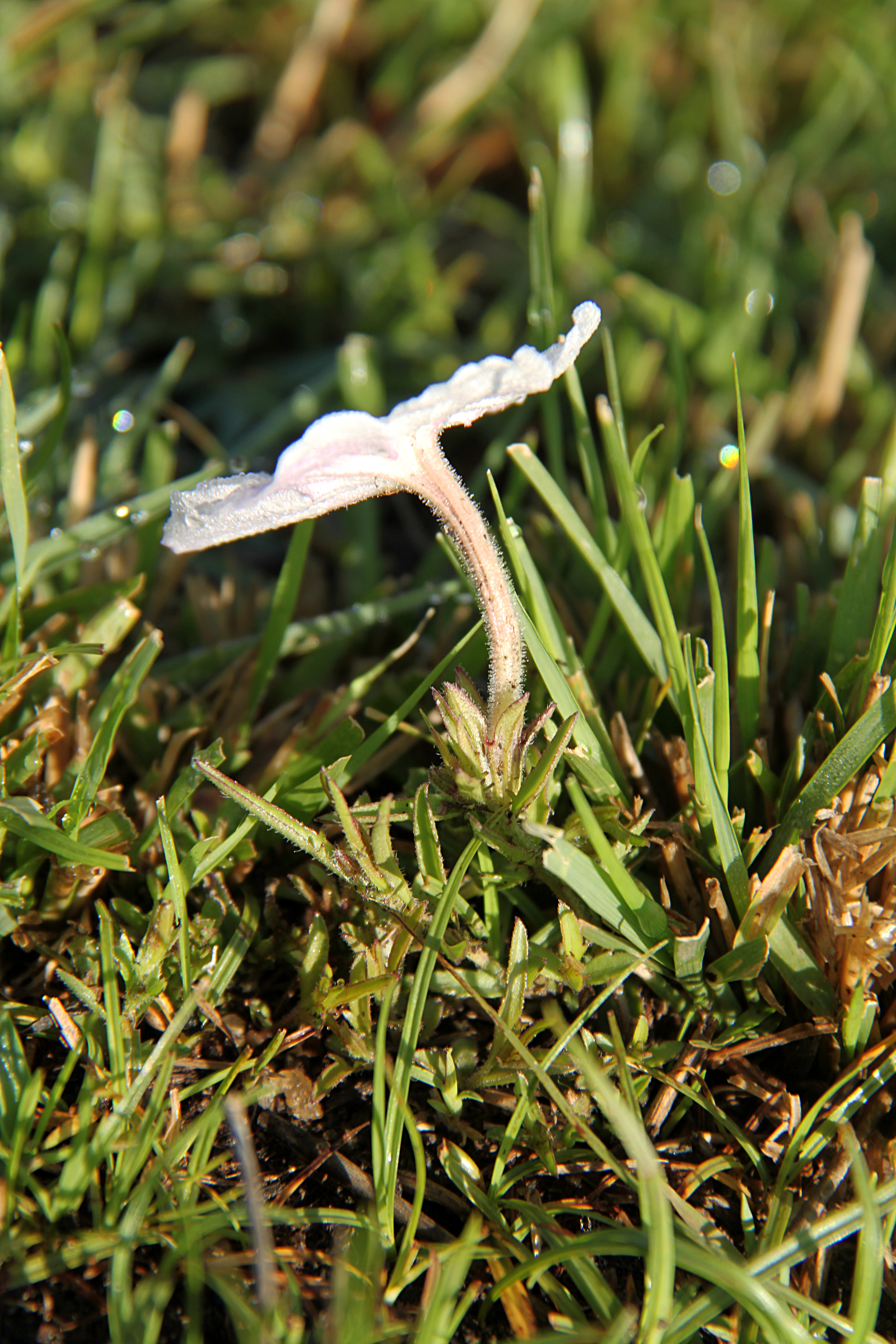

The vlei ink-flower is a hairless or nearly hairless, hemiparasitic, 12–60 cm (4.7–23.6 in) high perennial herbaceous plant, with angular stems having four flat sides, which are creeping, straggling or upright, that may have side branches or not, and sometimes there are a few glandular hairs. These stems carry few distanced leaves arranged oppositely or nearly so, which are approximately linear, widest at midlength, with a pointed cartilaginous tip, with a very short leaf stalk or seated, glossy, the margin entire or with a few teeth, rather thick, the veins sunken, 2–8 cm (0.79–3.15 in) long and 1–10 mm (0.039–0.394 in) wide. Its flowers are 1.75–3.25 cm (0.69–1.28 in) long, reminiscent of a Phlox. These are set individually in the axil of a bract on a slender but rigid pedicel of 0.75–2.5 cm (0.30–0.98 in) long, which does not carry any bracts subtending the flower. The five sepals are fused into a 0.8–1.3 cm (0.31–0.51 in) high bell- to cone-shaped calyx tube, with ten veins, and ending in five almost lanceolate keeled lobes, that become narrower towards their tips and are 4–8 mm (0.16–0.31 in) long. The corolla is white, pinkish or purple and consists of five petals, which are fused into a curved, cylindrical 1.6–2.8 cm (0.63–1.10 in) long corolla tube. Above the "limb", the corolla becomes an approximately flat disk 0.75–4.25 cm (0.30–1.67 in) in diameter, that splits into five ovate lobes with a rounded margin, with the two lobes at the outside of the curve merged over a greater length than the others. Inside the corolla tube are five stamens with softly hairy filaments topped by 2 mm (0.079 in) long hairless, oblong anthers. The style does not reach the stamens, and is topped by a thickened, pointy stigma. The fruit is a hairless, short, oblique, slightly compressed, oval capsule of 0.5–1.25 cm (0.20–0.49 in) long and wide, topped by a short and obliquely beak, and has coriaceous valves. The plant discolors to black when drying.

== Taxonomy ==
The plant was first described by Carl Linnaeus the Younger in 1782 as Gerardia tubulosa. Other species that initially were in this genus have later been assigned to Stenandrium (Acanthaceae), Agalinis (Scrophulariaceae), and Micrargeria (Orobanchaceae). In 1835, George Bentham though the species should be in the genus Rhamphicarpa, and made the new combination R. tubulosa. In his book Die Pflanzenwelt Ost-Afrikas und der Nachbargebiete of 1895, Adolf Engler assigned the species to Bentham's genus Cycnium.

=== Phylogeny ===
Recent DNA analysis has revealed the evolutionary relationships between many of the species in the broomrape family. Cycnium tubulosum is most related to C. adonense, and more distantly to C. racemosum. The genus Cycnium is monophyletic and the sister group of a clade consisting of the genera Buchnera and Striga. Most related to the clade consisting of Cycnium, Bruchnera and Striga is a clade consisting of Xylocalyx and Graderia. The current insights in these relationships are expressed in the following tree.

- tribe Buchnereae
  - - - - - genus Cycnium
            - - C. tubulosum
              - C. adonense
            - C. racemosum
          - - Buchnera
            - Striga
        - - Graderia
          - Xylocalyx
      - - Radamaea
        - Nesogenes
    - clade consisting of:
      Aeginetia, Christisonia, Harveya, Hyobanche,
      Centranthema, Alectra, Melasma and Escobedia
  - Sopubia

== Distribution and habitat ==
The vlei ink-flower is known from Angola, Botswana, Eswatini, Ethiopia, Kenya, Madagascar, Malawi, Mozambique, Namibia, Nigeria, Rwanda, Somalia, South Africa, South Sudan, Tanzania, Uganda, Zaire, Zambia, and Zimbabwe. It can be found in moist, short grasslands, reaching altitudes of about 1,550 m (5,090 ft).

== Ecology ==
The vlei ink-flower has white or rosy-tinged (sometimes purple) flowers that open in the evening, and have long narrow corolla tubes. These traits all occur in flowers that are pollinated by hawkmoths, although a clear scent was not observed. Hippotion celerio and Nephele comma have been seen to visit C. tubulosum.
