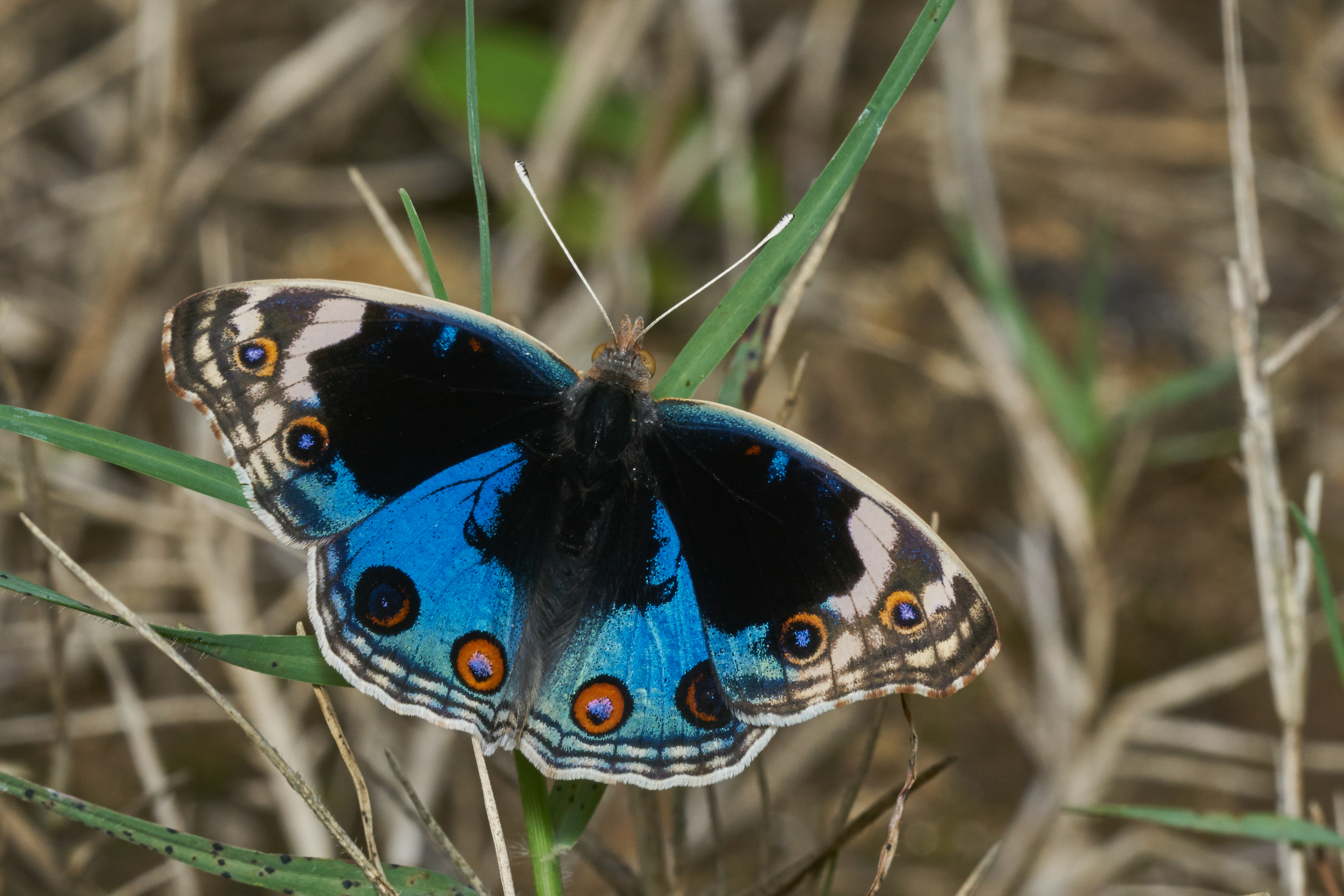
- Male
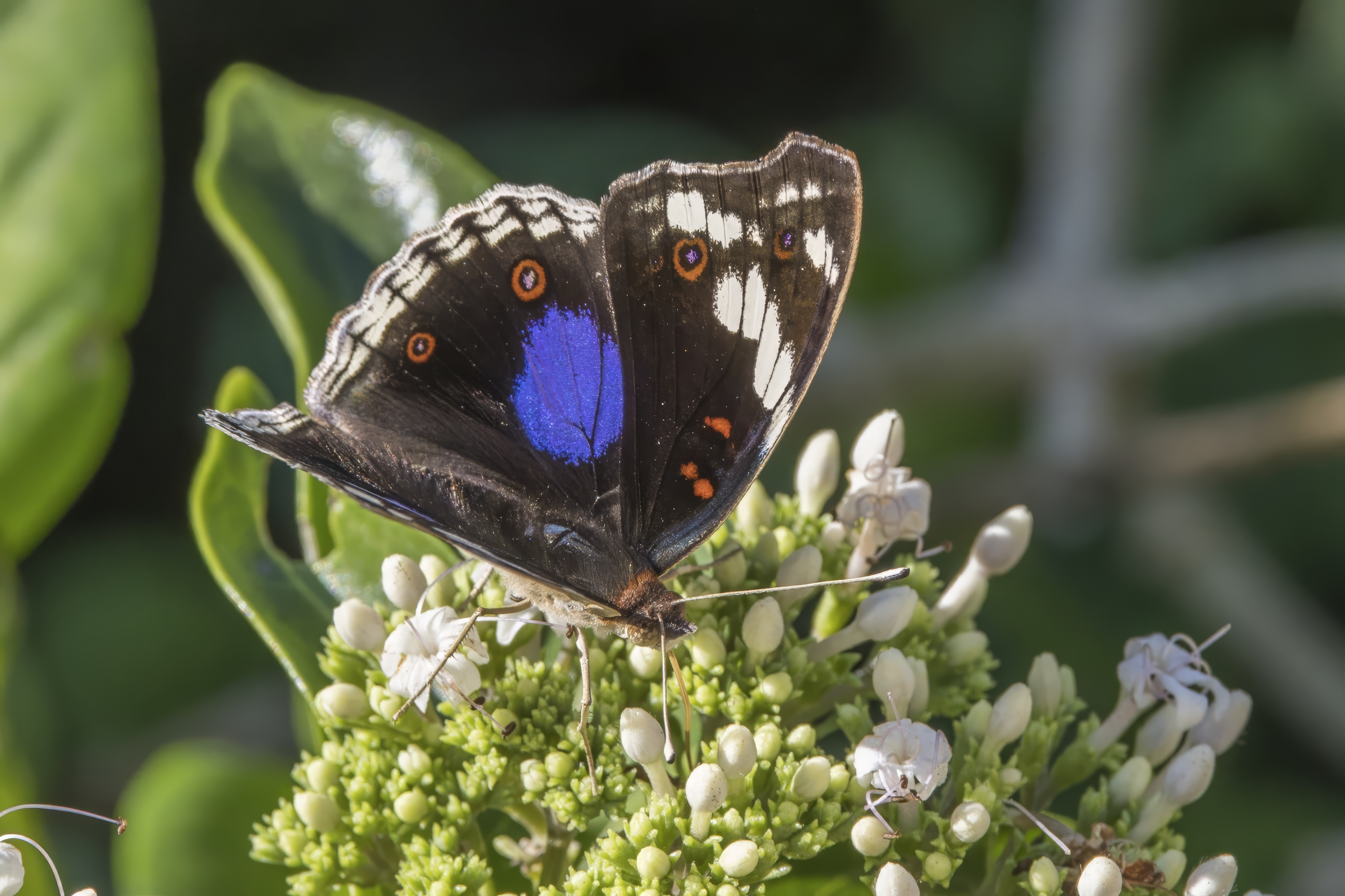
- Female

Conservation status
- Least Concern (IUCN 3.1)

Scientific classification
- Kingdom: Animalia
- Phylum: Arthropoda
- Clade: Pancrustacea
- Class: Insecta
- Order: Lepidoptera
- Family: Nymphalidae
- Genus: Junonia
- Species: J. orithya

Binomial name
- Junonia orithya (Linnaeus, 1758)

Synonyms
- Papilio orithya Linnaeus, 1758; Precis orithya; Junonia orithya f. isocratia Hübner, [1819]; Junonia orthyia var. leechi Alphéraky, 1897; Precis phycites Fruhstorfer, 1912; Precis orithya ab. jacouleti Watari, 1941; Precis patenas Fruhstorfer, 1912; Junonia ocyale Hübner, [1819]; Junonia alleni Kirby, [1900]; Precis orithya hainanensis Fruhstorfer, 1912; Junonia wallacei Distant, 1883; Junonia swinhoei Butler, 1885; Precis orithya leucasia Fruhstorfer, 1912; Vanessa orthosia Godart, [1824]; Junonia orbitola Swinhoe, 1893; Precis orithya eutychia Fruhstorfer, 1912; Precis orithya palea Fruhstorfer, 1912; Junonia orithya var. neopommerana Ribbe, 1898; Junonia albicincta Butler, 1875; Precis orithya cheesmani Riley, 1925; Junonia orythia var. madagascariensis Guenée, 1865; Junonia booepis Trimen, 1879; Precis orithya madagascariensis ab. punctella Strand, 1915; Junonia adamana Schultze, 1920 (hybrid oenone var. sudanica × orithya var. madagascariensis); Precis orithya ab. flava Wichgraf, 1918; Precis orithya saleyra Fruhstorfer, 1912; Precis orithya marcella Hulstaert, 1923

= Junonia orithya =

Species of butterfly

Junonia orithya is a nymphalid butterfly with many subspecies occurring from Africa, through South Asia, Southeast Asia, and Australia. In India, its common English name is the blue pansy, but in southern Africa it is known as the eyed pansy as the name blue pansy refers to Junonia oenone. In Australia, this butterfly is known as the blue argus, but this name also is used for the Aricia anteros in Europe.

The Blue Pansy has been declared as the state butterfly of the union territory of Jammu and Kashmir in India.

== Description ==
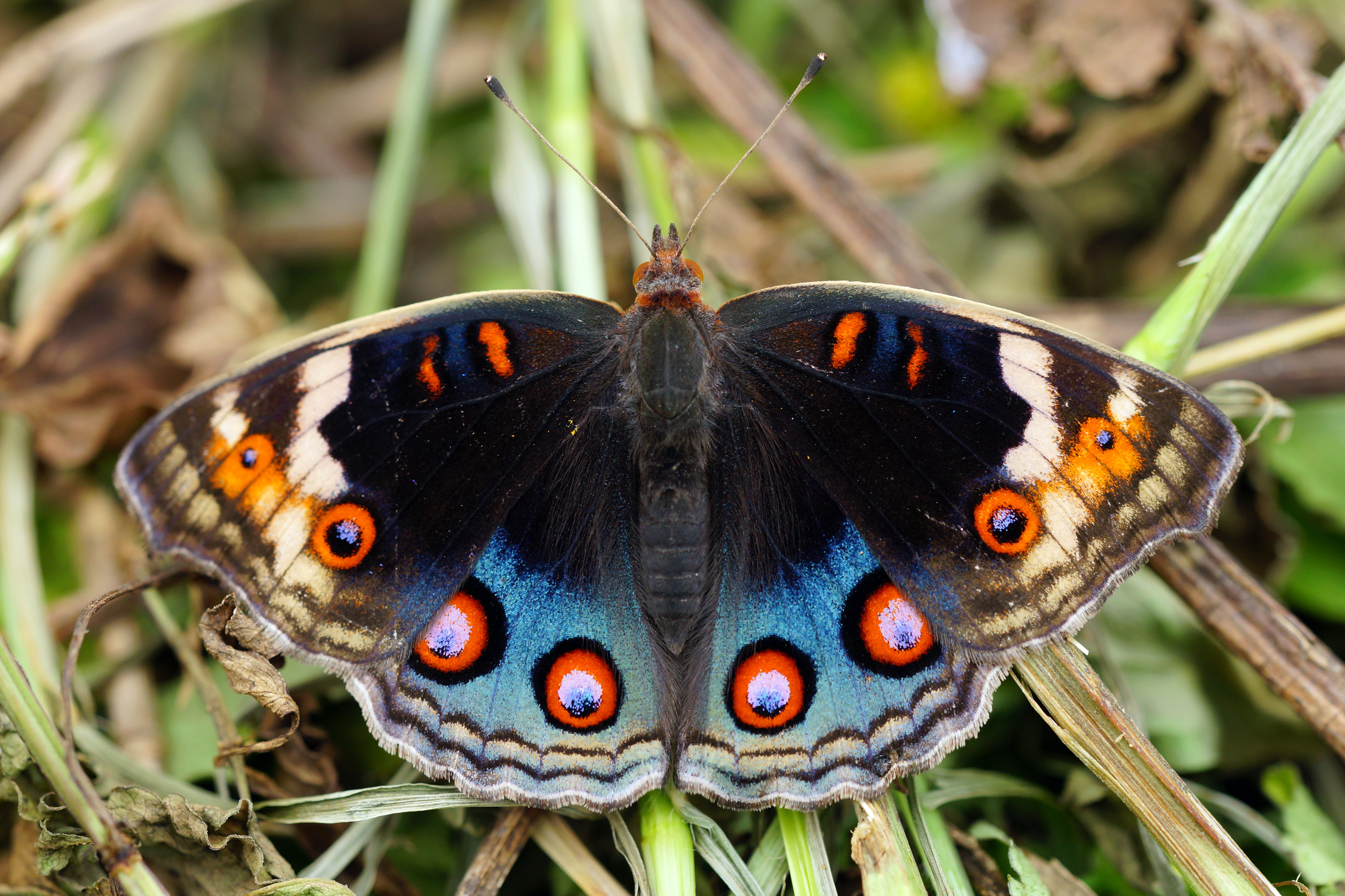
Female

Male upperside: somewhat more than half the forewing from base velvety black, apical half dull fuliginous; cell-area with or without two short transverse orange bars; a blue patch above, the tornus; the outer margin of the basal black area obliquely zigzag in a line from the middle of costa to apex of vein 2, including a large discal, generally obscure ocellus, which, however, in some specimens is prominently ringed with orange yellow. Beyond this a broad white irregularly oblique discal band followed by a short oblique preapical bar from costa; a small black orange-ringed ocellus beneath the bar, a subterminal continuous line of white spots in the interspaces and a terminal jet-black slender line; cilia alternately dusky black and white. Hindwing blue shaded with velvety black towards base; a postdiscal black white-centred orange and black-ringed ocellus in interspace 2, a round minutely white-centred velvety-black spot (sometimes entirely absent) in interspace 5; the termen narrowly white, traversed by an inner and an outer subterminal and a terminal black line; cilia white.

Underside forewing: basal half with three black-edged, sinuous, broad, ochraceous-orange transverse bands, followed by the pale discal baud; ocelli, preapical short bar, subterminal and terminal markings much as on the upperside; the discal band margined inwardly by a broad black angulated line which follows the outline of the black area of the upperside. Hindwing irrorated (sprinkled) with dusky scales and transversely crossed by subbasal and discal slender zigzag brown lines and a postdiscal dark shade, on which are placed the two ocelli as on the upperside; subterminal and terminal faint brown lines, and a brownish short streak tipped black at the tornal angle below the lower ocellus.

Female. Similar, with similar but larger and more clearly defined ocelli and markings; the basal half of the forewings and hindwings on the upperside fuliginous (sooty) brown, scarcely any trace of blue on the hindwing. Antennae brown, head reddish brown, thorax and abdomen above brownish black: palpi, thorax and abdomen beneath dull white.

Colouration of blue pansy adults can vary due to temperature shocks to the pupa, with orange colours increasing above 42 °C in females and an overall reduction in the blue colouration. Caterpillars exposed to cold thermal shocks developed into adults with reduced number of eyespots. Variations in colour and features such as eyespots can therefore occur due to the temperatures that caterpillars and pupae are exposed to.

== Life history ==
=== Larvae ===
"Head and body of a very dark shining black shading into brown. ... head on a short neck, latter of an orange colour for a short distance; caudal extremity also tipped with orange. Body covered with perpendicular spines armed with strong radial hairs. ... Head bifurcated, reddish spot in centre of face, a small spinous process in the angle of each eye." (Forsayeth in de Nicéville)

=== Pupae ===
The pupa is "suspended by tail, naked; wing-covers of a muddy yellow; rest of body of a purplish colour variegated by lines of a dull creamy white. Slight projections of an angular nature along abdomen." (Idem.)

=== Adults ===
The adults occur in open areas, often sitting on bare ground. This species has a stiff flap and glide style of flight and maintains a territory, driving away other butterflies that enter it.

== Food plants ==
Larval host plants are recorded from the families Acanthaceae, Annonaceae, Convolvulaceae, Labiatae, Plantaginaceae, Scrophulariaceae, Verbenaceae, Violaceae and specific plants are Angelonia salicariifolia, Annona senegalensis, Antirrhinum majus, Asystasia gangetica, Asystasia scandens, Buchnera linearis, Englerastrum scandens, Hygrophila salicifolia, Hygrophila senegalensis, Ipomoea batatas, Justicia micrantha, Justicia procumbens, Lepidagathis formosensis, Lepidagathis prostrata, Lindenbergia indica, Misopates orontium, Phyla nodiflora, Plantago amplexicaulis, Plectranthus scandens, Pseuderanthemum variabile, Striga asiatica, Striga hermonthica, Thunbergia alata, Viola odorata

In southern Africa the food plants are; Graderia subintegra, Cycnium adonense, Hygrophila species and Plectranthus species.

== Gallery ==
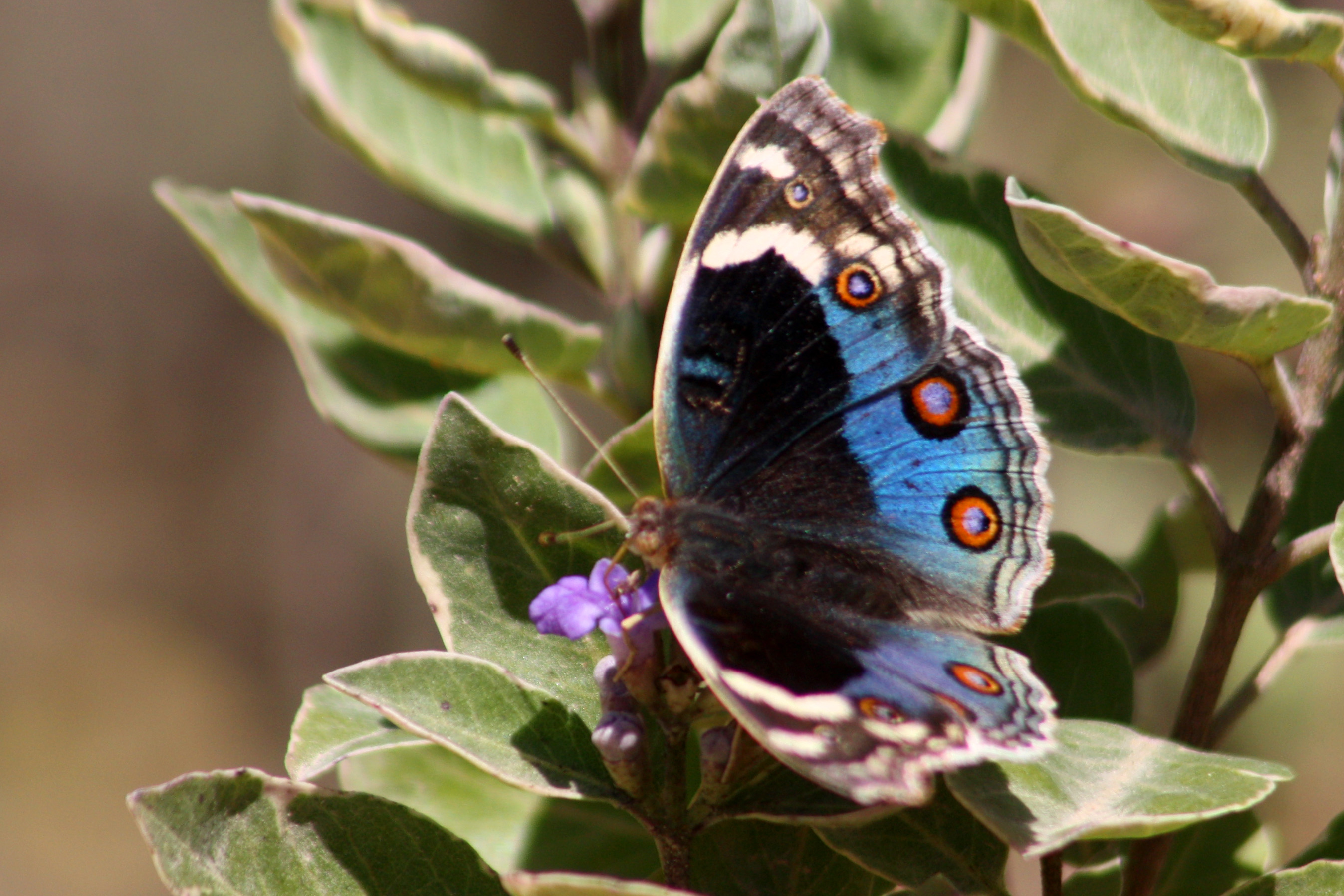
In the United Arab Emirates

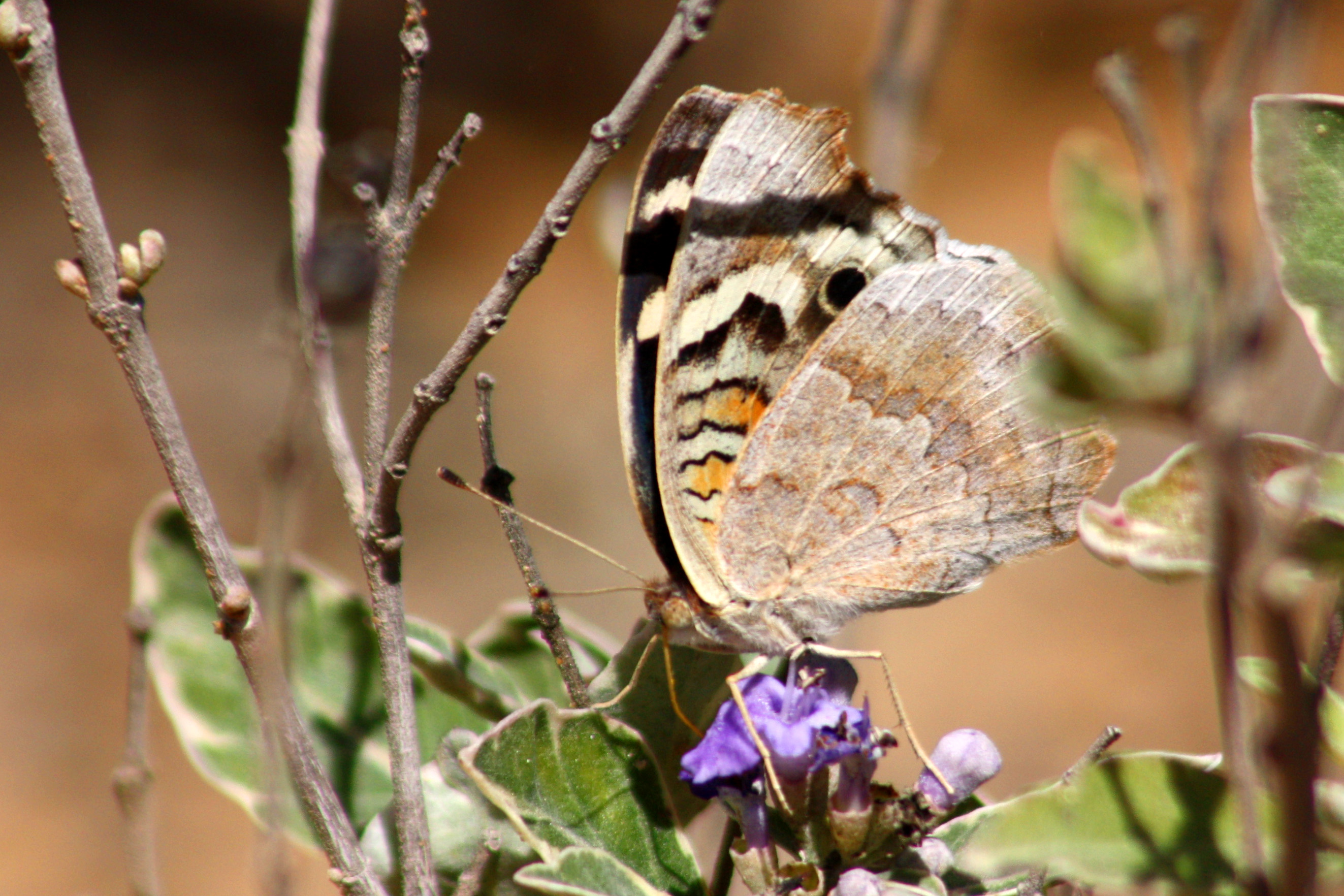
In the United Arab Emirates

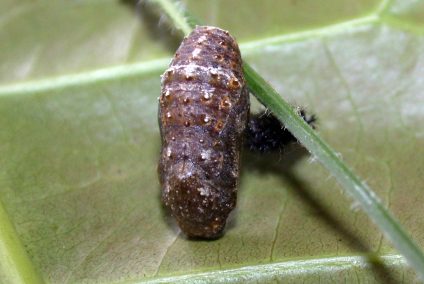
Chrysalis

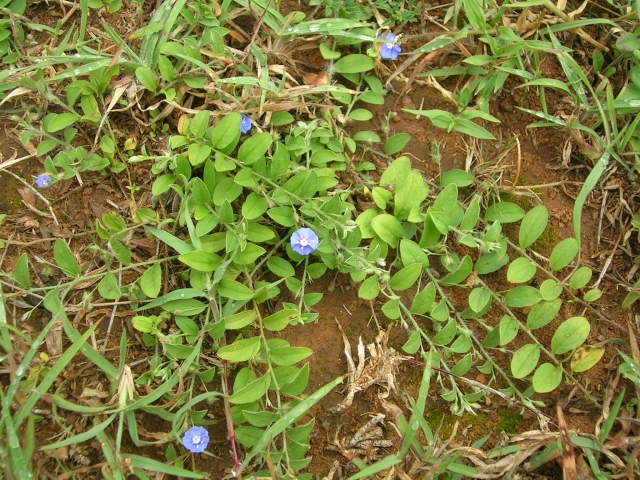
Evolvulus species, a host plant

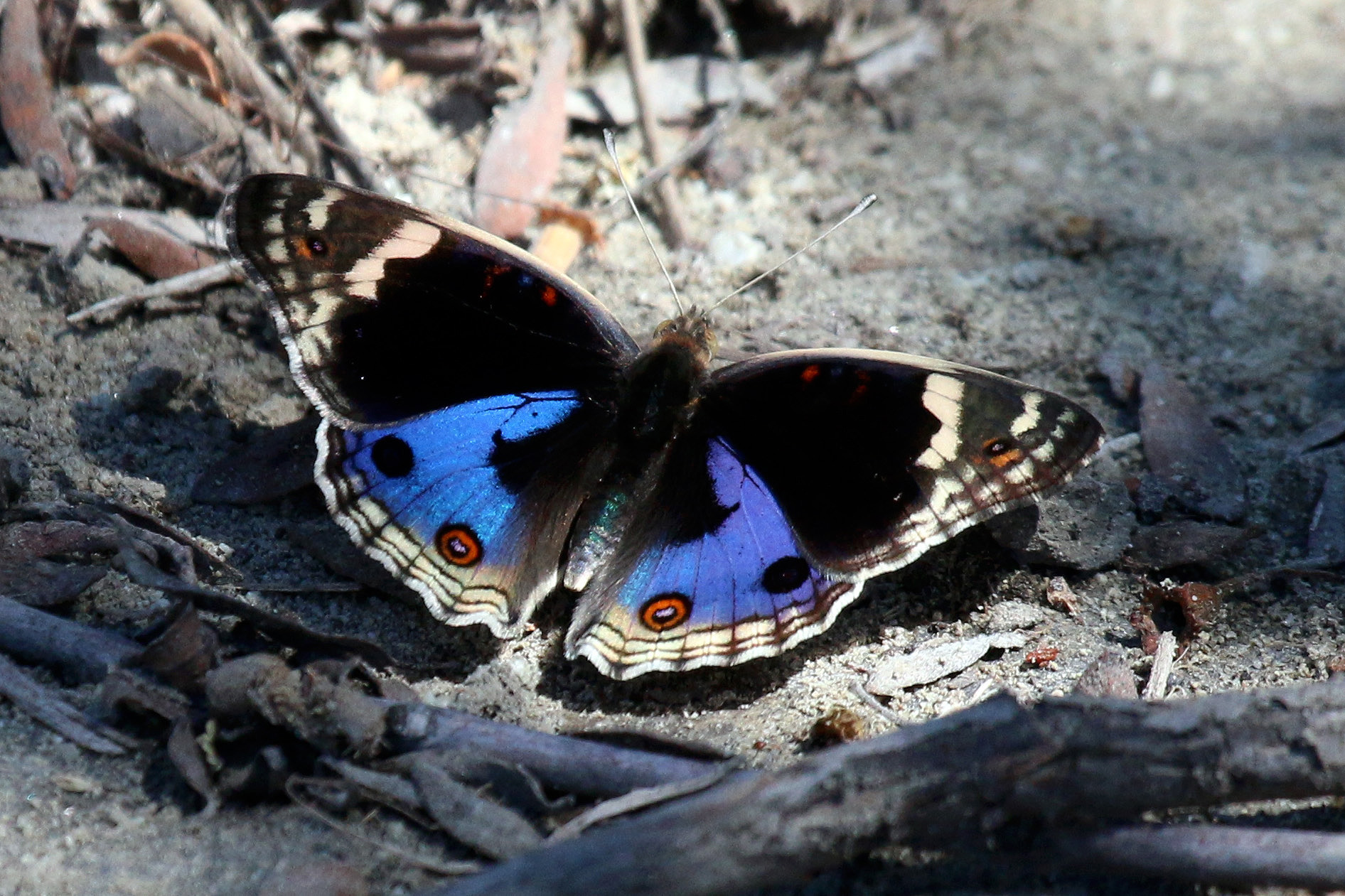
J. o. minagara male, Komodo National Park, Indonesia

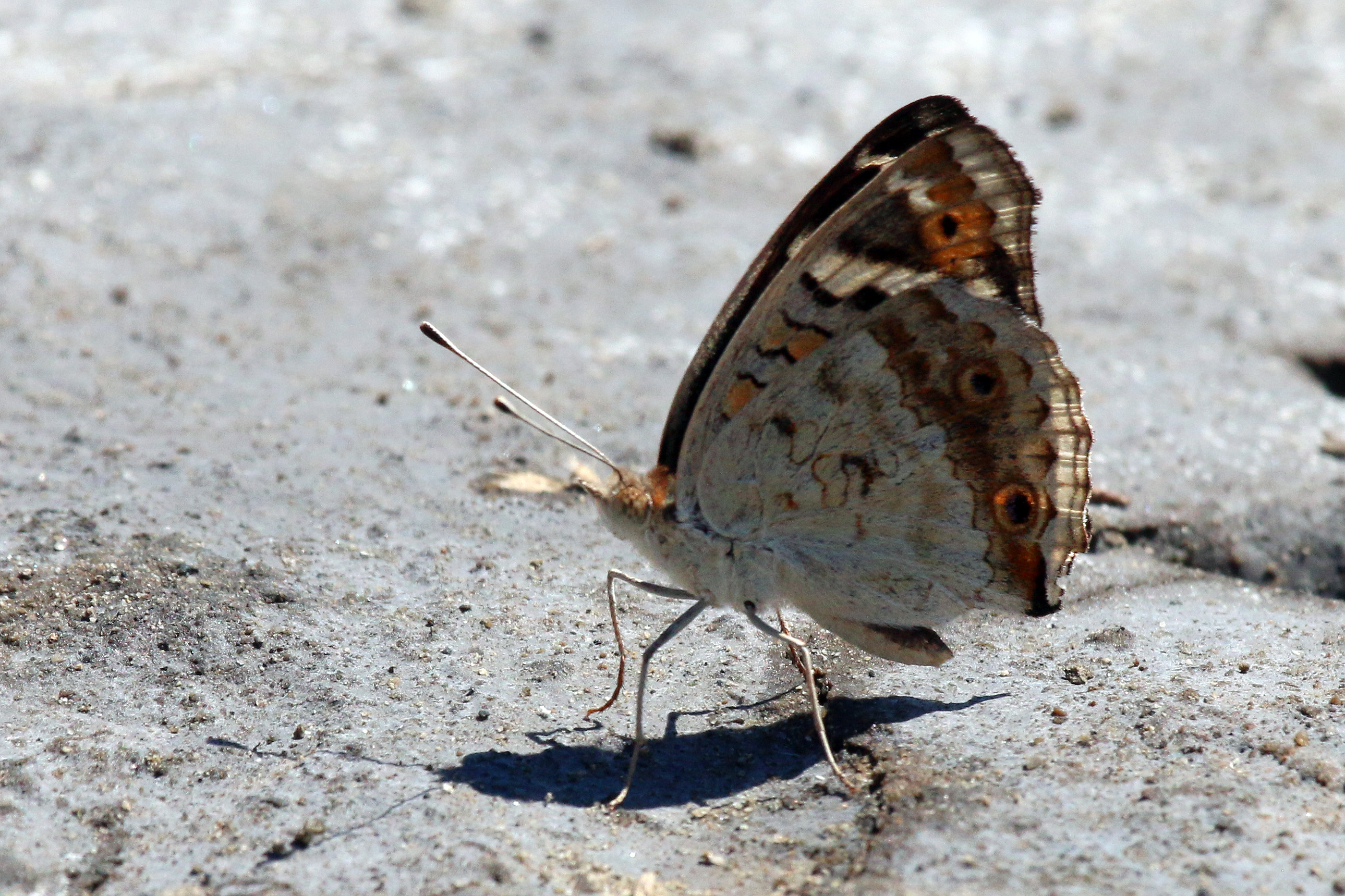
J. o. minagara male, Komodo National Park, Indonesia

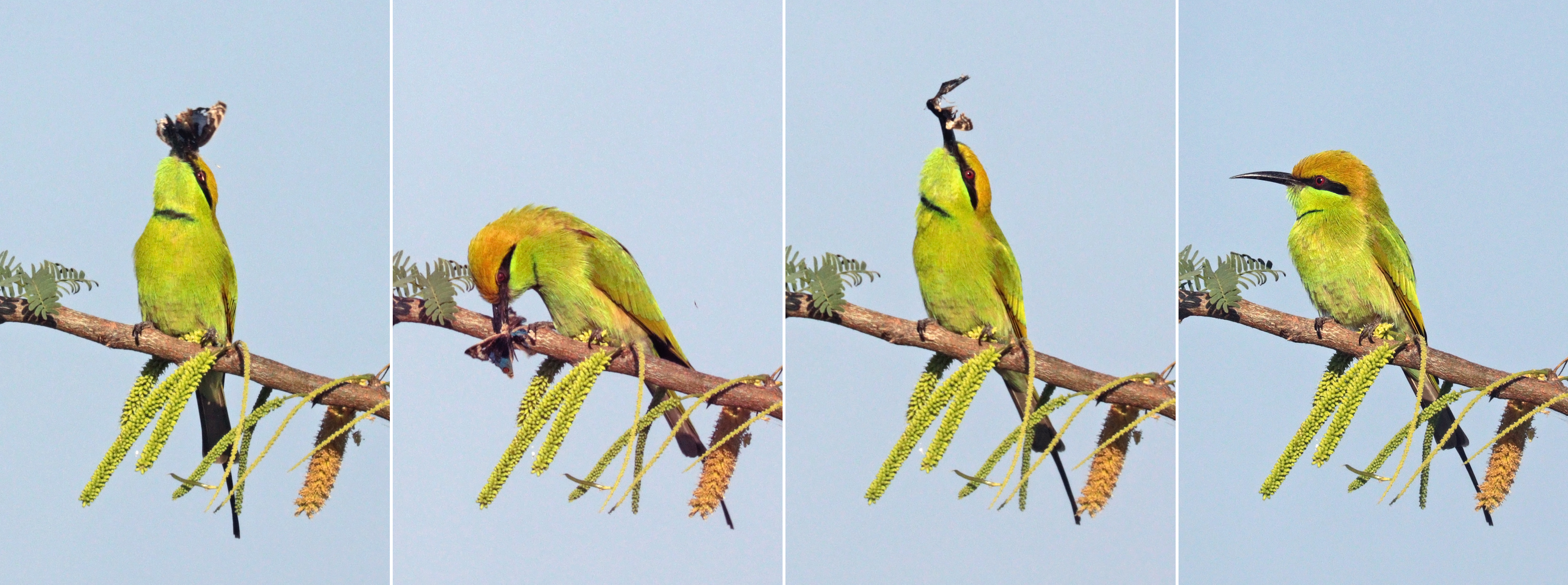
J. o. ocyale eaten by green bee-eater, India

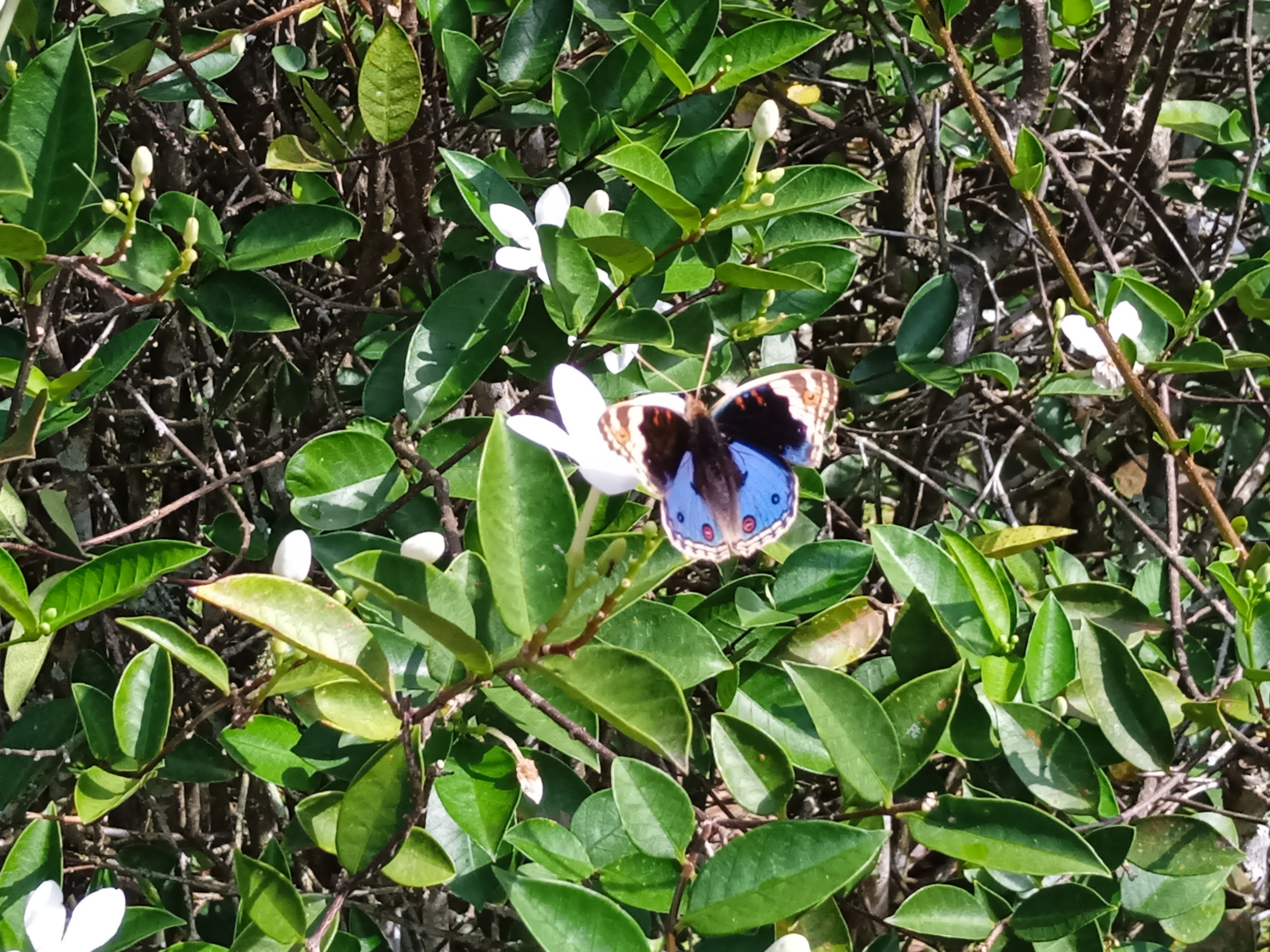
In Malaysia

== Subspecies ==
- Junonia orithya albicincta Butler, 1875 (northern Australia, Cape York to Brisbane)
- Junonia orithya baweana Fruhstorfer, 1906 (Bawean)
- Junonia orithya celebensis Staudinger, [1888] (Sulawesi, Muna)
- Junonia orithya eutychia (Fruhstorfer, 1912) (Timor, Wetar, Babar, Kissar)
- Junonia orithya hainanensis (Fruhstorfer, 1912) (Hainan)
- Junonia orithya here Lang, 1884 (Saudi Arabia, Yemen)
- Junonia orithya kontinentalis Martin, 1920 (Sulawesi)
- Junonia orithya kuehni Fruhstorfer, 1904 (Lesser Sunda Islands, Kalao, Tukangbesi)
- Junonia orithya leucasia (Fruhstorfer, 1912) (Philippines)
- Junonia orithya madagascariensis Guenée, 1865 (Sub-Saharan Africa)
- Junonia orithya marcella (Hulstaert, 1923) (New Guinea)
- Junonia orithya metion Fruhstorfer, 1905 (Borneo)
- Junonia orithya mevaria Fruhstorfer, 1904 (Lombok)
- Junonia orithya minagara Fruhstorfer, 1904 (Java, Bali, Komodo Islands)
- Junonia orithya minusculus Fruhstorfer, 1906 (Sumba)
- Junonia orithya neopommerana Ribbe, 1898 (New Britain)
- Junonia orithya novaeguineae Hagen, 1897 (New Guinea to Papua)
- Junonia orithya ocyale Hübner, [1819] (India to southern Burma and southern Yunnan)
- Junonia orithya orithya (Oriental region)
- Junonia orithya orthosia (Godart, [1824]) (Ambon, Serang, Saparua, Sula Islands, Maluku)
- Junonia orithya palea (Fruhstorfer, 1912) (Tanimbar)
- Junonia orithya patenas (Fruhstorfer, 1912) (Sri Lanka)
- Junonia orithya saleyra (Fruhstorfer, 1912) (Salayar)
- Junonia orithya sumatrana Fruhstorfer, 1906 (Sumatra)
- Junonia orithya swinhoei Butler, 1885 (Burma)
- Junonia orithya wallacei Distant, 1883 (Thailand, Peninsular Malaysia, Singapore)
