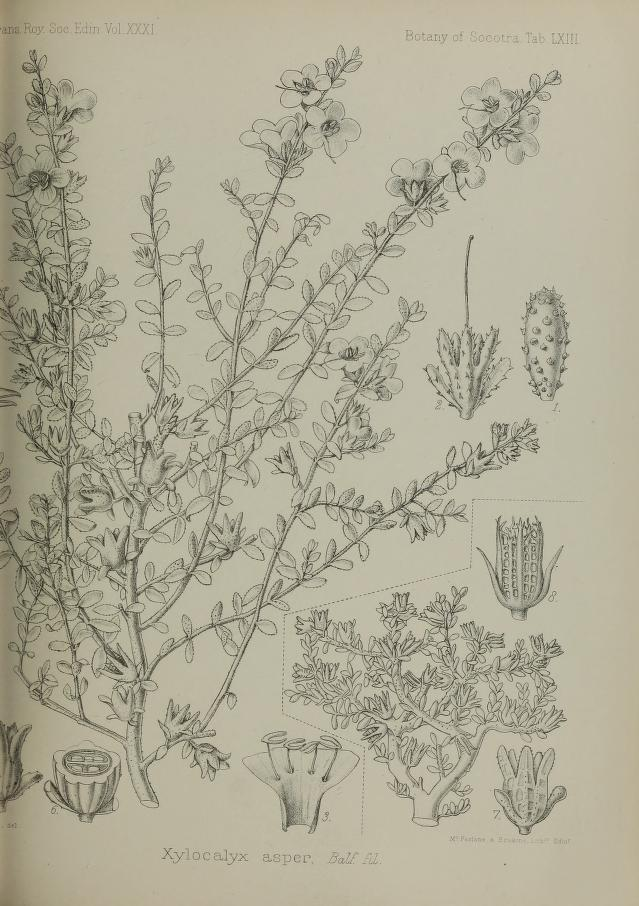

Conservation status
- Least Concern (IUCN 3.1)

Scientific classification
- Kingdom: Plantae
- Clade: Tracheophytes
- Clade: Angiosperms
- Clade: Eudicots
- Clade: Asterids
- Order: Lamiales
- Family: Orobanchaceae
- Genus: Xylocalyx
- Species: X. asper

Binomial name
- Xylocalyx asper Balf.f.

= Xylocalyx asper =

Species of plant

Xylocalyx asper is a species of plant in the family Orobanchaceae. It is a subshrub endemic to the islands of Socotra and Samhah in Yemen's Socotra Archipelago. It grows on coastal plains and dry foothills, and less commonly on limestone plateaus (Ras Geridihon), from sea level to 600 metres elevation. It grows at lower elevations than X. aculeolatus.
