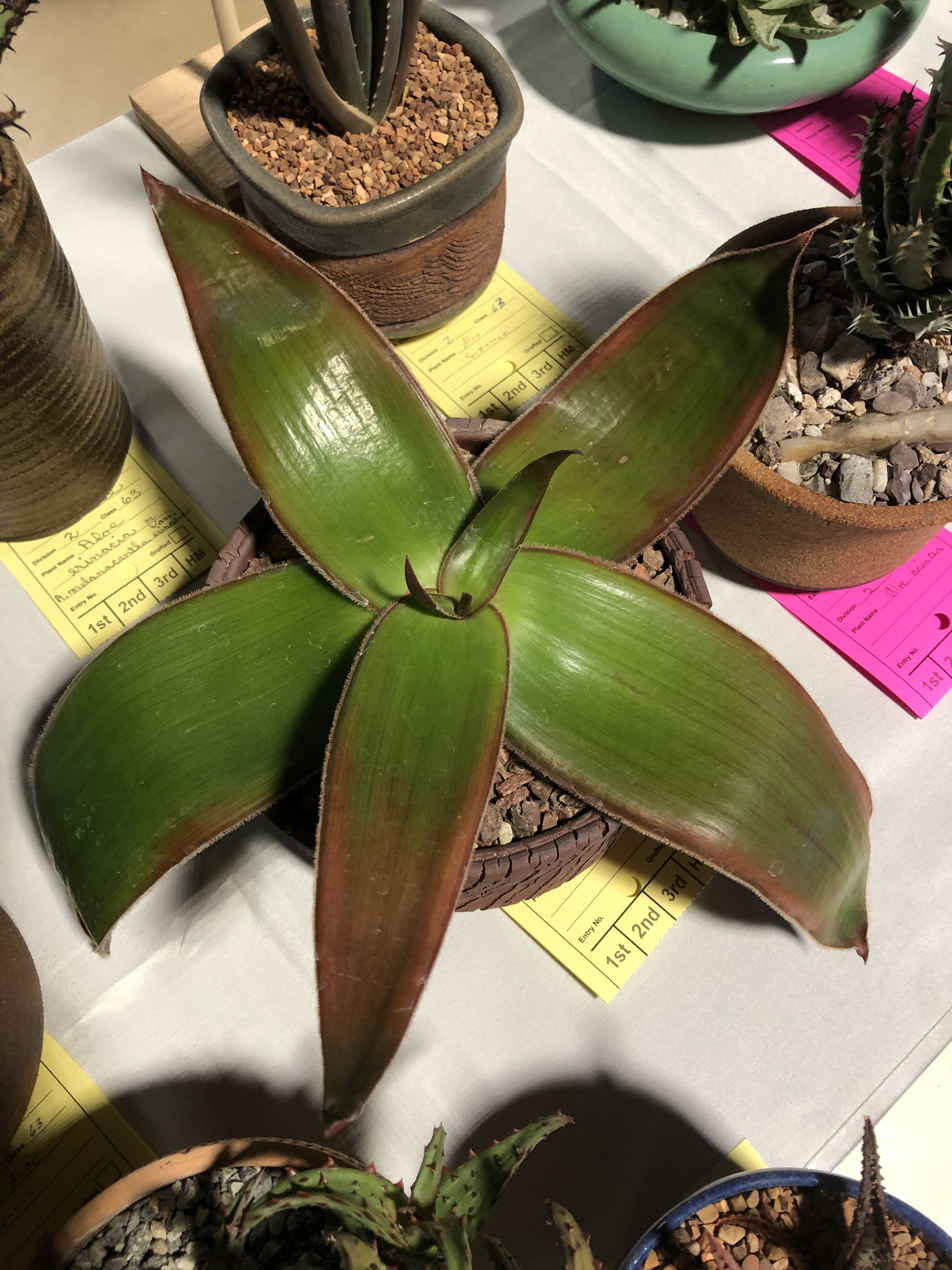

Conservation status
- Critically Endangered (IUCN 3.1)
- CITES Appendix II

Scientific classification
- Kingdom: Plantae
- Clade: Tracheophytes
- Clade: Angiosperms
- Clade: Monocots
- Order: Asparagales
- Family: Asphodelaceae
- Subfamily: Asphodeloideae
- Genus: Aloe
- Species: A. fimbrialis

Binomial name
- Aloe fimbrialis S.Carter

= Aloe fimbrialis =

Species of succulent plant

Aloe fimbrialis is a succulent plant species from Zambia and possibly Tanzania. A very unusual Aloe as it forms a caudex which can grow to five centimeters in diameter, the leaves grow up to ten centimeters long. The inflorescence can reach 90 centimeters in length and has coral-pink flowers. It usually grows on termite mounds. Aloe fimbrialis is a very rare aloe, first discovered in 1964 and formally described by Susan Carter Holmes in 1996 from a herbarium specimens. Graham Williamson rediscovered the species in 2002 on the border of Zambia and Angola, close to the source of the Zambezi River.
