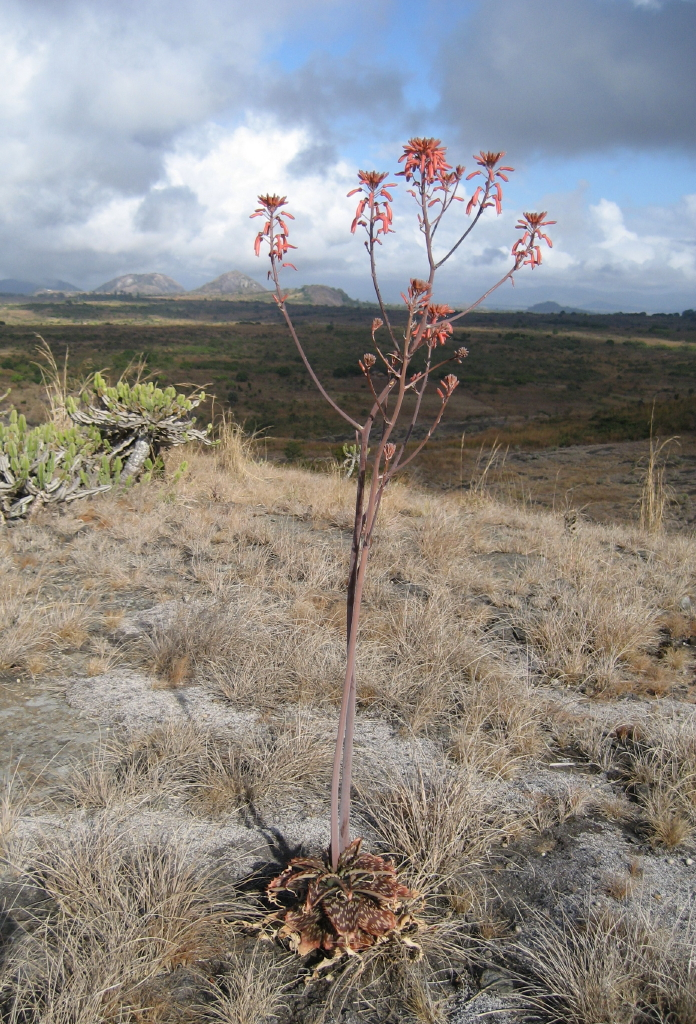

Conservation status
- Least Concern (IUCN 3.1)
- CITES Appendix II

Scientific classification
- Kingdom: Plantae
- Clade: Tracheophytes
- Clade: Angiosperms
- Clade: Monocots
- Order: Asparagales
- Family: Asphodelaceae
- Subfamily: Asphodeloideae
- Genus: Aloe
- Species: A. carnea

Binomial name
- Aloe carnea S.Carter

= Aloe carnea =

Species of succulent

Aloe carnea is a species of Aloe native to Mozambique and Zimbabwe.
