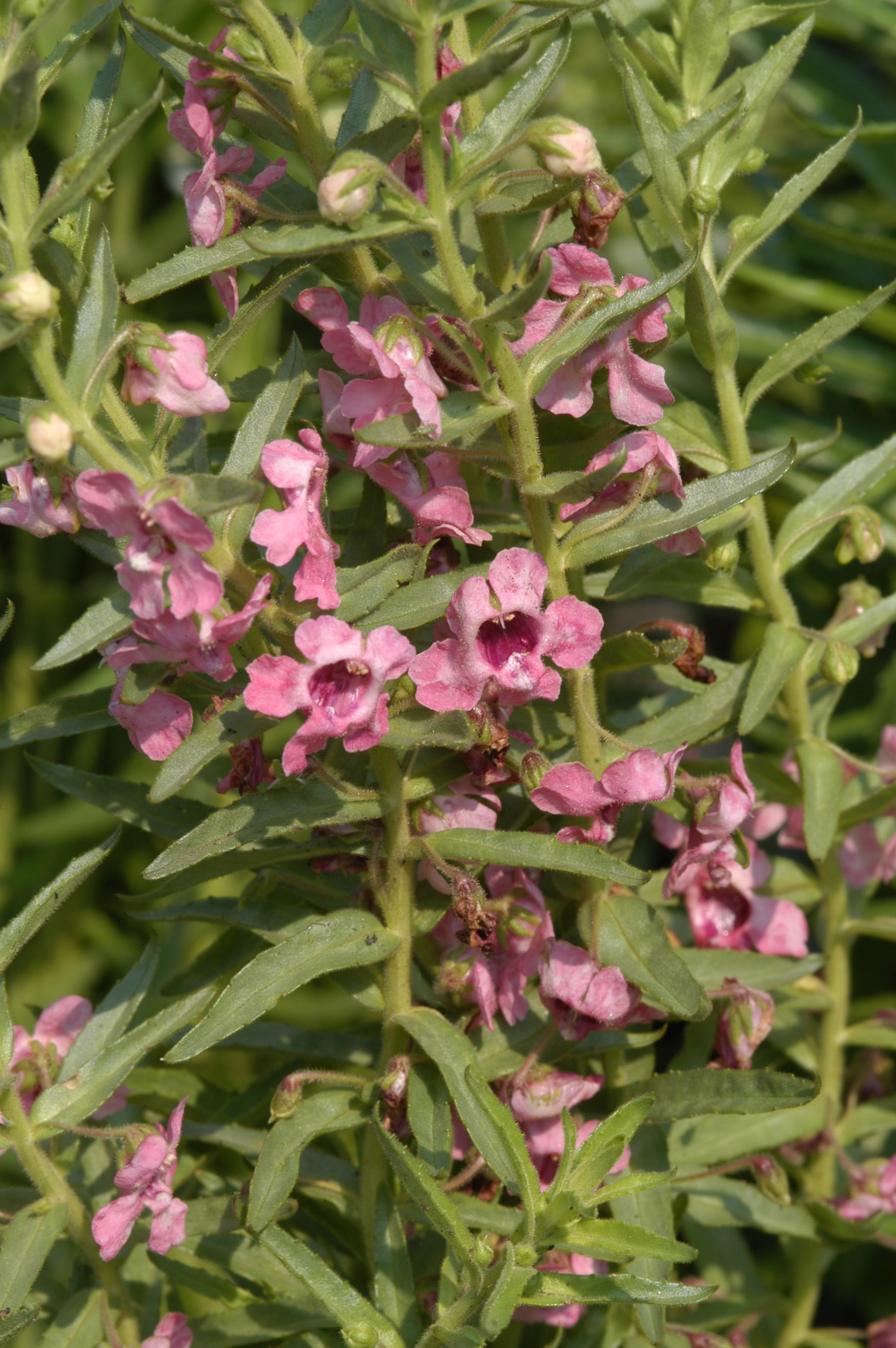

Scientific classification
- Kingdom: Plantae
- Clade: Tracheophytes
- Clade: Angiosperms
- Clade: Eudicots
- Clade: Asterids
- Order: Lamiales
- Family: Plantaginaceae
- Genus: Angelonia
- Species: A. biflora

Binomial name
- Angelonia biflora Benth. (1846)

Synonyms
- Angelonia grandiflora C.Morren (1847)

= Angelonia biflora =

Species of plant

Angelonia biflora is a species of flowering plant in the family Plantaginaceae. It is a subshrub native to Colombia, Guyana, and northeastern and west-central Brazil.

It is used as an ornamental plant, sometimes under the synonym Angelonia grandiflora.
