= Xylocalyx aculeolatus =

Conservation status
- Least Concern (IUCN 3.1)

Scientific classification
- Kingdom: Plantae
- Clade: Tracheophytes
- Clade: Angiosperms
- Clade: Eudicots
- Clade: Asterids
- Order: Lamiales
- Family: Orobanchaceae
- Genus: Xylocalyx
- Species: X. aculeolatus

Binomial name
- Xylocalyx aculeolatus S.Carter

Species of flowering plant

Xylocalyx aculeolatus is a species of plant in the family Orobanchaceae. It is a subshrub endemic to the island of Socotra in Yemen. It grows in low shrubland on limestone plateaus from 200 to 600 metres elevation.
