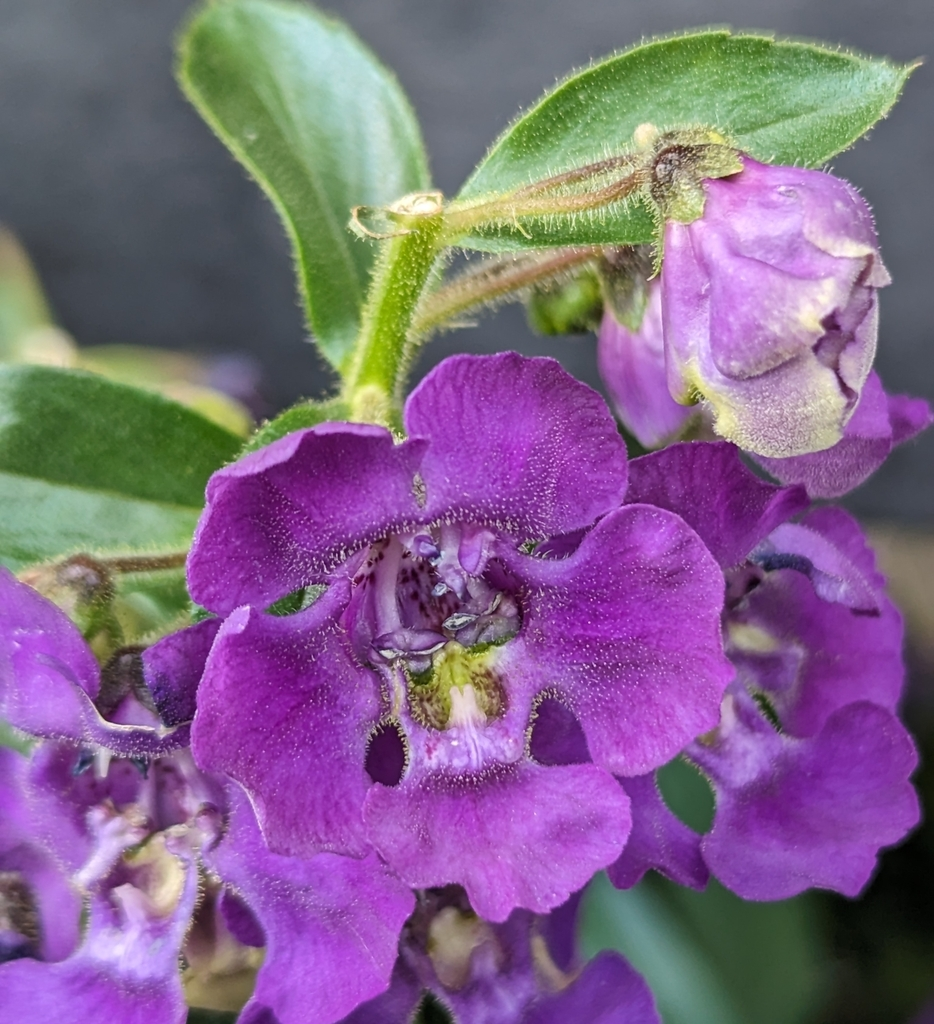

Scientific classification
- Kingdom: Plantae
- Clade: Tracheophytes
- Clade: Angiosperms
- Clade: Eudicots
- Clade: Asterids
- Order: Lamiales
- Family: Plantaginaceae
- Genus: Angelonia
- Species: A. angustifolia

Binomial name
- Angelonia angustifolia Benth., 1846

= Angelonia angustifolia =

Species of plant

Angelonia angustifolia, the summer snapdragon, is a species of perennial plant in the family Plantaginaceae.

== Description ==
Angelonia angustifolia has flowers that are either pink, blue, white, or purple. The flowers are reminiscent of snapdragons, although they are of a different genus. The flowers protrude off a center stem and has spear shaped serrated leaves.

== Range ==
Angelonia angustifolia is native to Mexico and the West Indies, but has been introduced (often in captivity) notably in America, India, and Southeast Asia.

== Habitat ==
Summer snapdragons grow in moist soil and in full sun. It can survive in arid to semi-arid regions.
