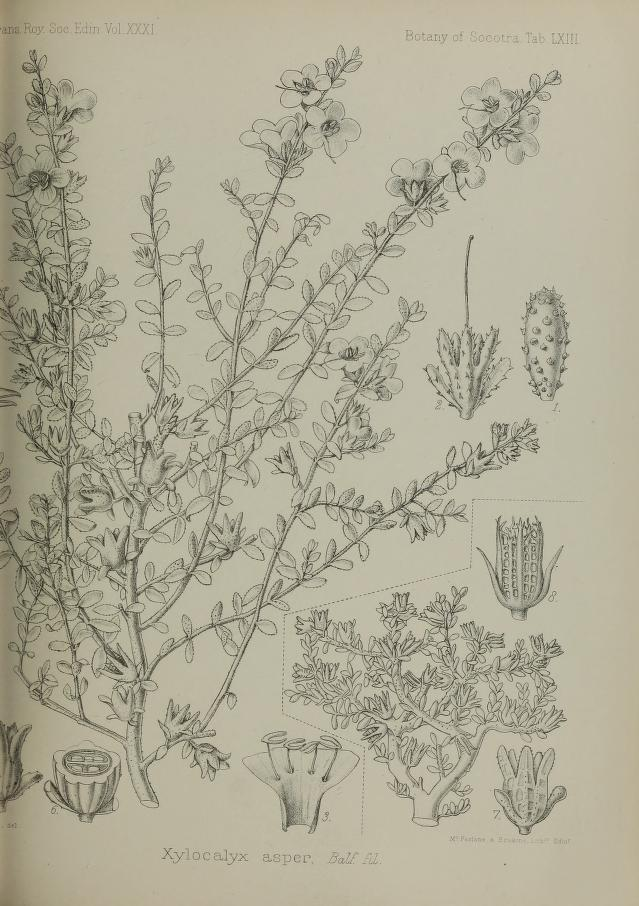
- Xylocalyx asper

Scientific classification
- Kingdom: Plantae
- Clade: Embryophytes
- Clade: Tracheophytes
- Clade: Spermatophytes
- Clade: Angiosperms
- Clade: Eudicots
- Clade: Asterids
- Order: Lamiales
- Family: Orobanchaceae
- Tribe: Buchnereae
- Genus: Xylocalyx; Balf.f.

= Xylocalyx =

Genus of flowering plants in the broomrape family

Xylocalyx is a genus of plants in the family Orobanchaceae.

== Species ==
Species include:

- Xylocalyx aculeolatus S.Carter
- Xylocalyx asper Balf.f.
- Xylocalyx carterae Thulin
- Xylocalyx hispidus S.Carter
- Xylocalyx recurvus S.Carter
