= Graderia fruticosa =

Conservation status
- Vulnerable (IUCN 3.1)

Scientific classification
- Kingdom: Plantae
- Clade: Tracheophytes
- Clade: Angiosperms
- Clade: Eudicots
- Clade: Asterids
- Order: Lamiales
- Family: Orobanchaceae
- Genus: Graderia
- Species: G. fruticosa

Binomial name
- Graderia fruticosa Balf.f.

Species of plant

Graderia fruticosa is a species of plant in the family Orobanchaceae. It is a shrub endemic to the island of Socotra in Yemen. It grows in shrubland on rocky slopes and ridges in the high Hajhir Mountains of central Socotra from 700 to 1,300 metres elevation.
