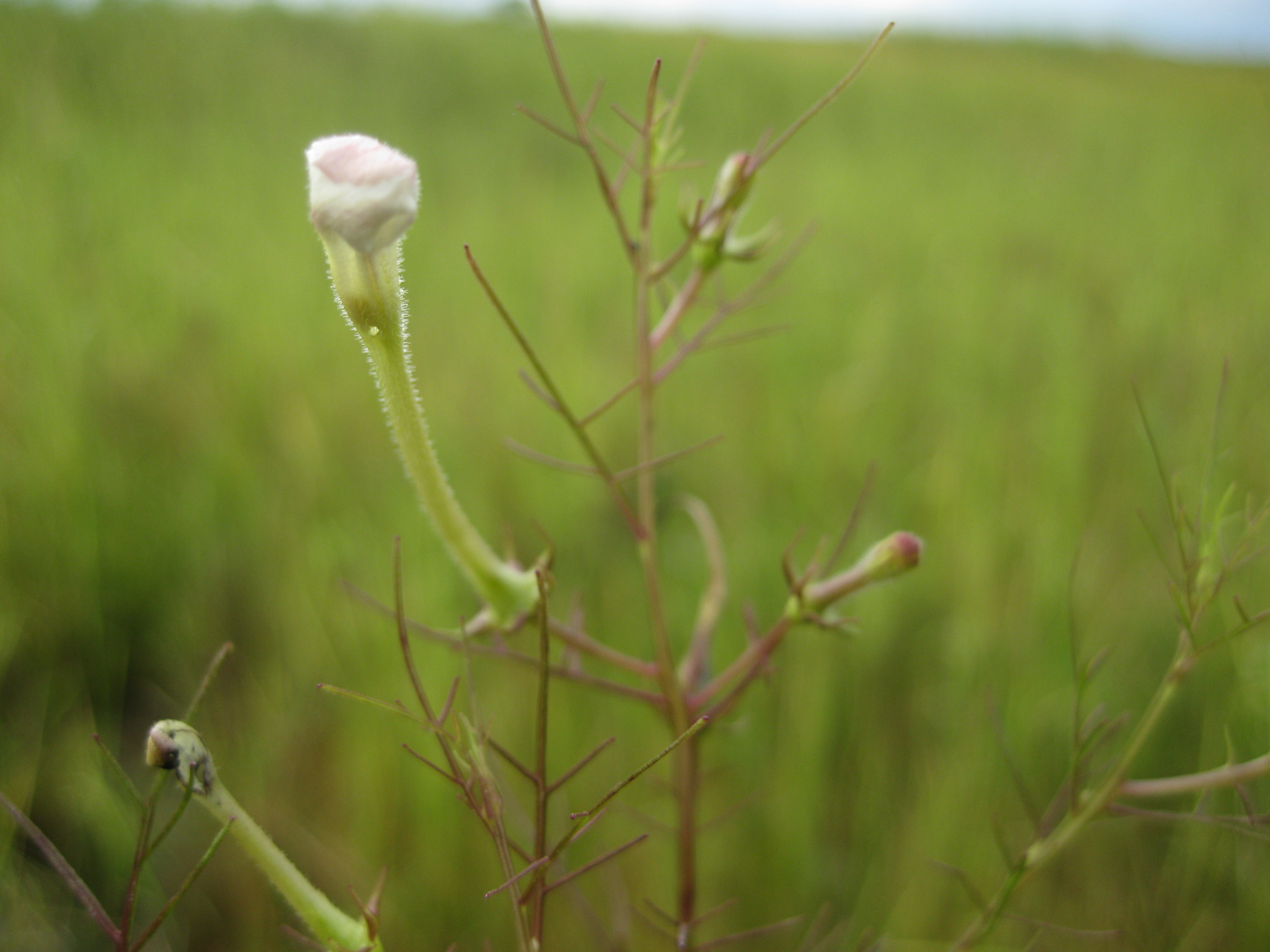
- Flower of Rhamphicarpa fistulosa

Conservation status
- Least Concern (IUCN 3.1)

Scientific classification
- Kingdom: Plantae
- Clade: Tracheophytes
- Clade: Angiosperms
- Clade: Eudicots
- Clade: Asterids
- Order: Lamiales
- Family: Orobanchaceae
- Genus: Rhamphicarpa
- Species: R. fistulosa

Binomial name
- Rhamphicarpa fistulosa (Hochst.) Benth.

Synonyms
- Macrosiphon fistulosus Hochst.; Buchnera longiflora Arn.; Rhamphicarpa longiflora Benth.

= Rhamphicarpa fistulosa =

Species of plant

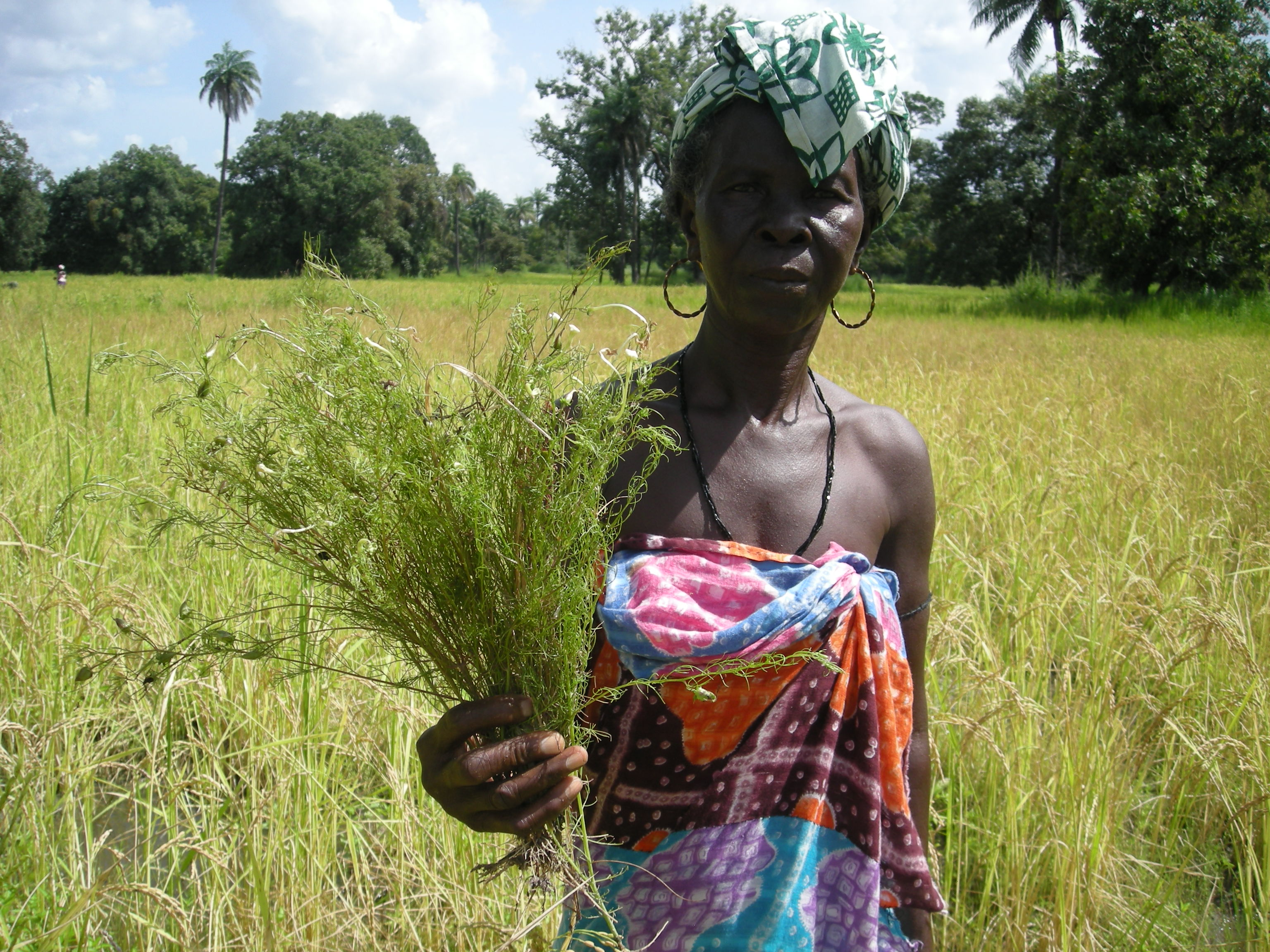
A rice farmer in the Casamance (southern Senegal) showing R. fistulosa invading her crop; Photo: J. Rodenburg (AfricaRice).

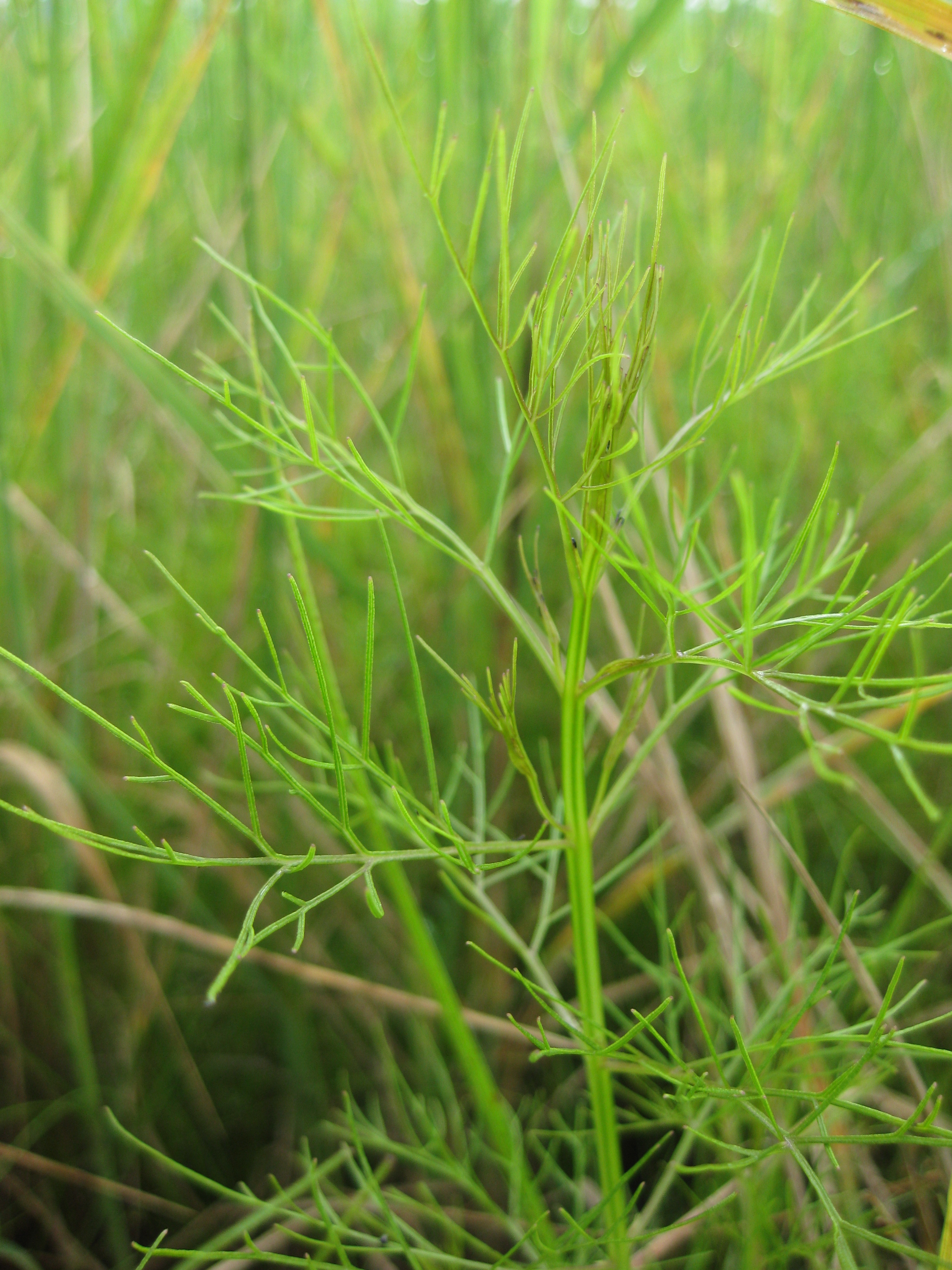
R. fistulosa is pale green with needle-like leaves; Photo: J. Rodenburg (AfricaRice)

Rhamphicarpa fistulosa (common name: rice vampireweed) is a flowering plant species in the family Orobanchaceae (formerly in the family Scrophulariaceae) - and the genus Rhamphicarpa. The plant is pale-green but can turn reddish towards maturity. It has needle-like leaves and white flowers with long corolla tubes. The flowers only open after sunset and are supposedly pollinated by night moths. The plant has a broad distribution in Africa (from Guinea to Madagascar and from Sudan to South Africa) and can also be found in New Guinea and northern Australia.

Rhamphicarpa fistulosa is an annual facultative hemi-parasitic forb species. It is a very widespread species in seasonally flooded wetlands in tropical and sub-tropical Africa, and it is increasingly important as a parasitic weeds in rain-fed lowland rice systems in Africa, where yield losses of more than 60% are typically reported. It is particularly a problem in rice fields prone to temporary, uncontrolled flooding. Management strategies against Rhamphicarpa fistulosa are limited; hand-weeding, permanent flooding, fertilizer applications and the use of herbicides are currently known, effective control measures. In addition, a number of high-yielding, resistance and tolerant rice varieties has recently been identified.

A team of researchers from the Africa Rice Center (AfricaRice), Wageningen University, FAO and the national research centers of Tanzania (MARI), Côte d'Ivoire (CNRA) and Benin (INRAB), investigates the importance of this species as a parasitic weed to rice and tries to elucidate its biology, ecology and host damage mechanisms and to develop, with participating farmers, management strategies. The economic and social determinants and impact is also studied and national extension and crop protection systems are analyzed with the aim to identify constraints and challenges for the effective control and prevention of invasive pests such as Rhamphicarpa fistulosa. The project, called PARASITE is funded by the Netherlands Organisation for Scientific Research - Science for Global Development and receives additional financial support through the CGIAR Research Program on Climate Change, Agriculture and Food Security (CCAFS). The PARASITE project (www.parasite-project.org) has so far resulted in 10 published SCI journal papers.

Other groups working on Rhamphicarpa fistulosa: Laboratory of Applied Ecology, Department of Natural Research Management, Faculty of Agronomic Sciences, University of Abomey-Calavi, P.O. Box 526, Cotonou, Benin; AgroSup Dijon, UMR 1347 Agro-ecologie Pôle EcolDur, 17 rue Sully, BP 86510, 21065 Dijon cedex, France.
