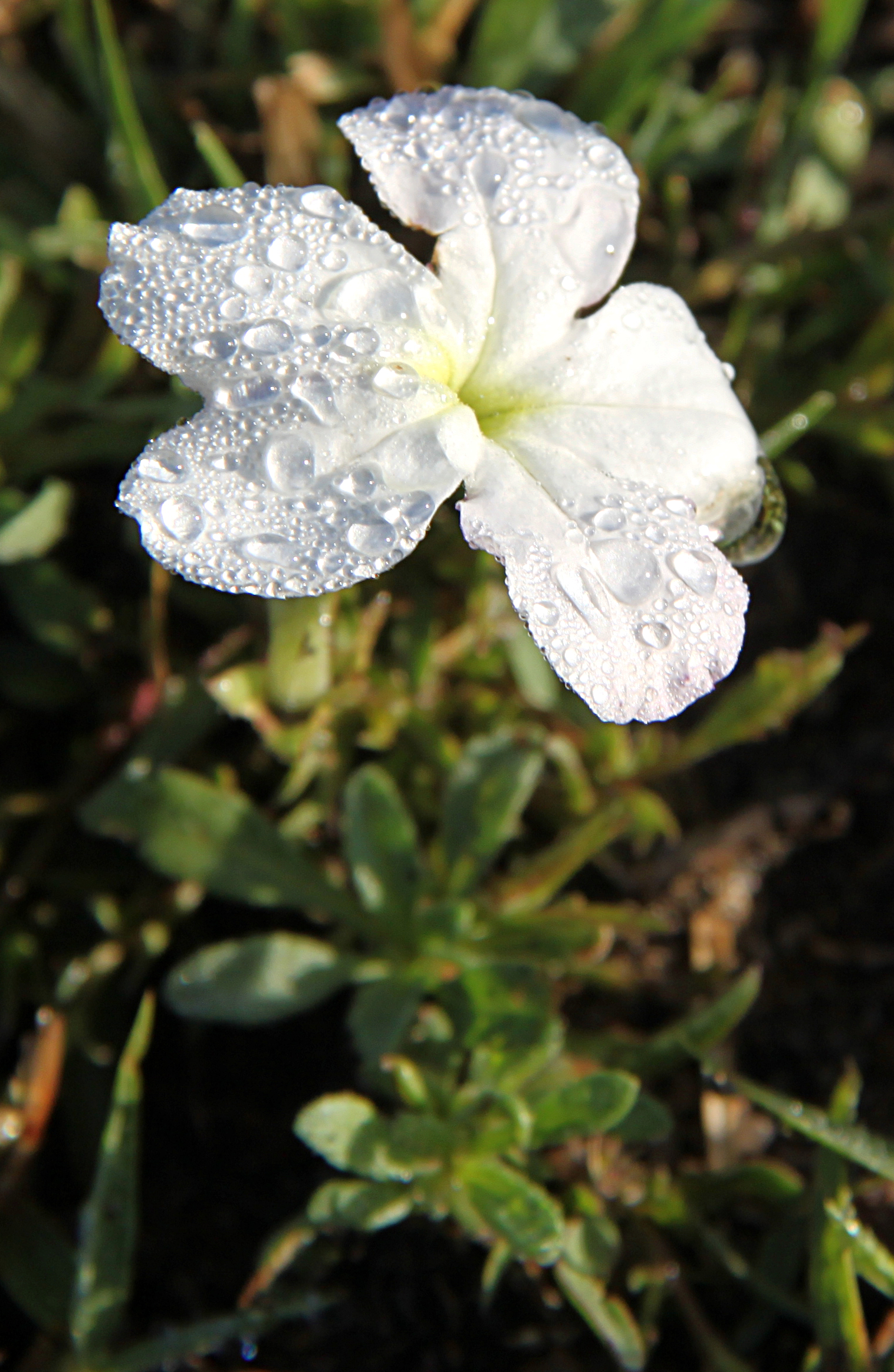
- Cycnium tubulosum in Maasai Mara, Kenya

Scientific classification
- Kingdom: Plantae
- Clade: Embryophytes
- Clade: Tracheophytes
- Clade: Spermatophytes
- Clade: Angiosperms
- Clade: Eudicots
- Clade: Asterids
- Order: Lamiales
- Family: Orobanchaceae
- Tribe: Buchnereae
- Genus: Cycnium; E.Mey. ex Benth.

= Cycnium =

Genus of flowering plants in the broomrape family

Cycnium is a genus of flowering plants in the family Orobanchaceae. Its native range is tropical and southern Africa and Madagascar.

Plants in this genus are annual or perennial hemiparasitic herbs or small shrubs that turn black when they die. Leaves usually occur opposite or near-opposite, but occasionally alternate or in whorls of three. Leaves may pinnatisect or bipinnatisect, with incised or entire margins, and may be sessile or shortly petiolate. Flowers may be terminally spicate or racemose, solitary-axillary, or supra-axillary. Flowers are edicellate to sessile or subsessile. Bracts are leaf-like. In species in which they are present, bracteoles are inserted on the pedicel or are adnate to the base of the calyx tube. The tube-ridged calyx has 4–5 lobes which are equal or subequal. The corolla is 5-lobed and salver-form. The tube is curved, bent, or straight, covered with stipitate glands and with a unilaterally bearded throat. The limb is bilabiate and zygomorphic, with the lower lip 3-lobed. Anthers each have one theca. The ovary is bilocular, variable, compressed or not. Ovules are numerous. Fruit is either a capsule or a berry.

== Species ==
As of March 2022, Plants of the World Online accepted the following species:

- Cycnium adonense E.Mey. ex Benth.
- Cycnium ajugifolium Engl.
- Cycnium angolense (Engl.) O.J.Hansen
- Cycnium breviflorum Ghaz.
- Cycnium cameronianum (Oliv.) Engl.
- Cycnium chevalieri Diels
- Cycnium erectum Rendle
- Cycnium filicalyx (E.A.Bruce) O.J.Hansen
- Cycnium herzfeldianum (Vatke) Engl.
- Cycnium jamesii (Skan) O.J.Hansen
- Cycnium petunioides Hutch.
- Cycnium racemosum Benth.
- Cycnium recurvum (Oliv.) Engl.
- Cycnium tenuisectum (Standl.) O.J.Hansen
- Cycnium tubulosum (L.f.) Engl.
- Cycnium veronicifolium (Vatke) Engl.
- Cycnium volkensii Engl.
