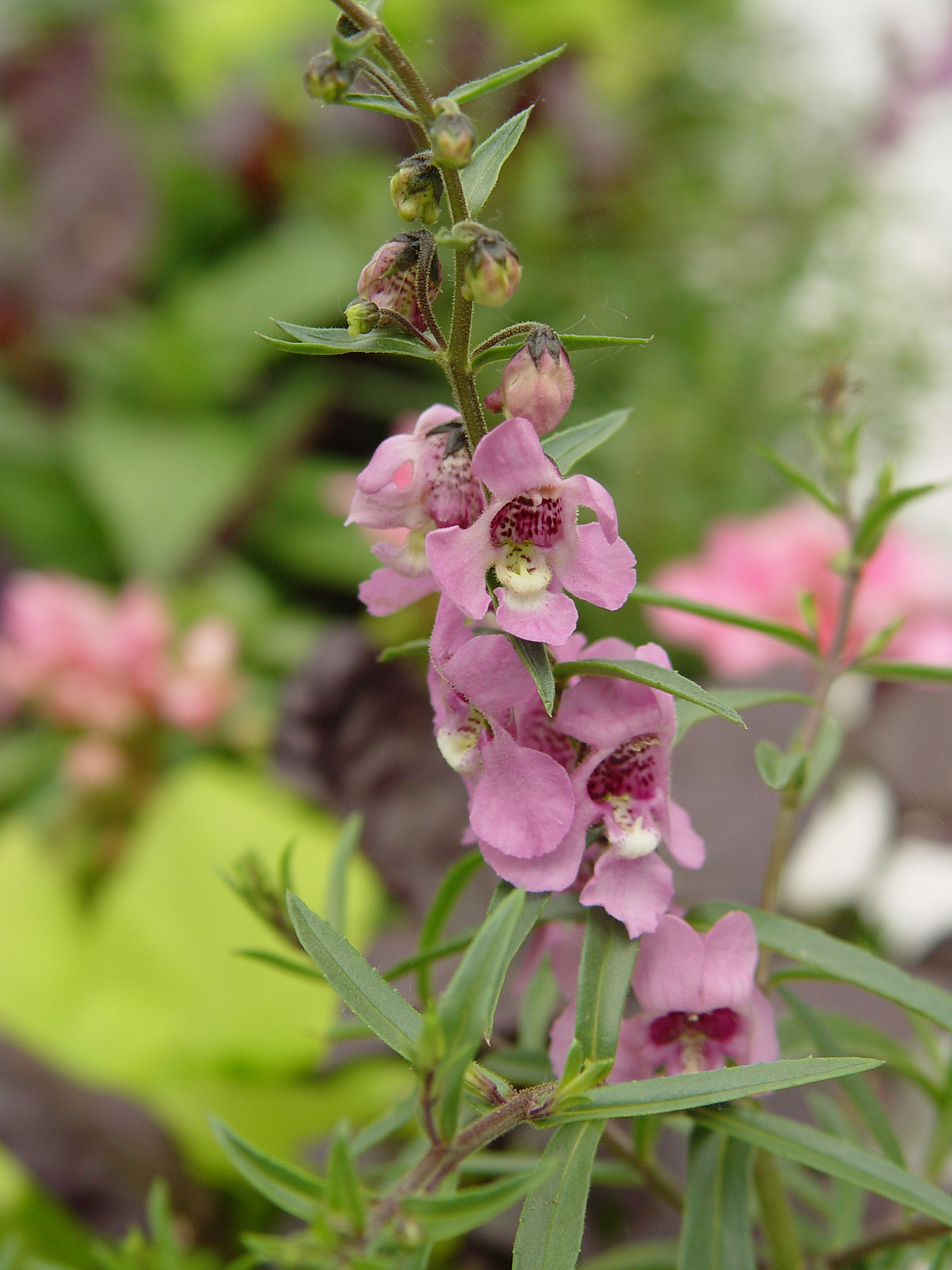
- Angelonia angustifolia

Scientific classification
- Kingdom: Plantae
- Clade: Tracheophytes
- Clade: Angiosperms
- Clade: Eudicots
- Clade: Asterids
- Order: Lamiales
- Family: Plantaginaceae
- Tribe: Angelonieae
- Genus: Angelonia; Bonpl. (1812)

Species
- See text

Synonyms
- Monopera Barringer (1983); Phylacanthus Benth. (1835); Physidium Schrad. (1821); Schelveria Nees & Mart. (1821); Thylacantha Nees & Mart. (1823)

= Angelonia =

Genus of flowering plants

Angelonia is a genus of flowering plants in the family Plantaginaceae. It comprises about 30 species which occur from Mexico to Argentina. Species of the genus Angelonia are herbaceous plants occurring mainly in arid and semi-arid habitats. Most species can be found in north-eastern Brazil in the seasonally-dry tropical forest Caatinga. The flowers of Angelonia species are highly specialized for pollination because they have hairs in the inner corolla, which produces oils collected by oil bee pollinators, especially of the genus Centris.

== Cultivation ==
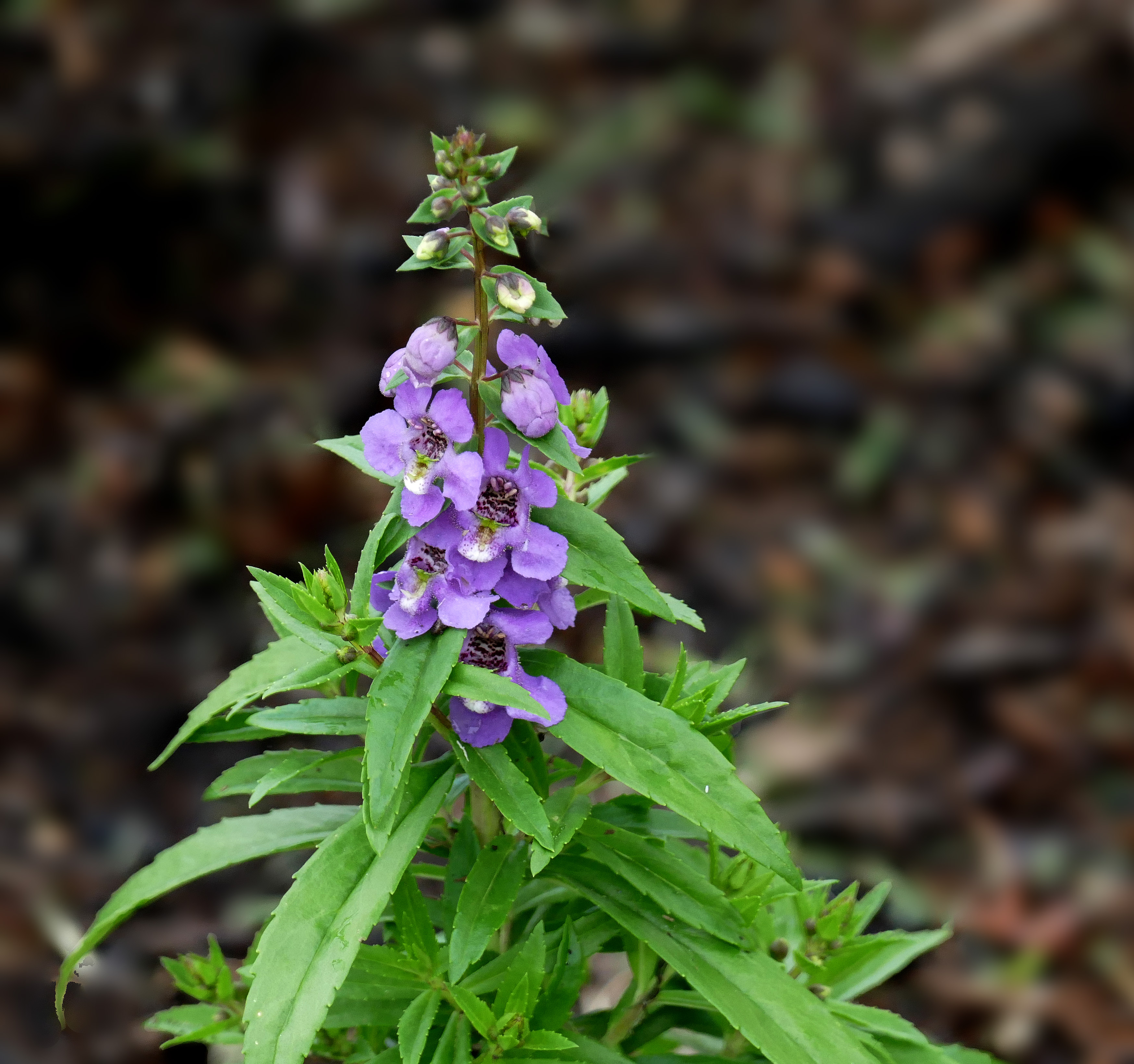
Summer snapdragon -- Angelonia angustifolia

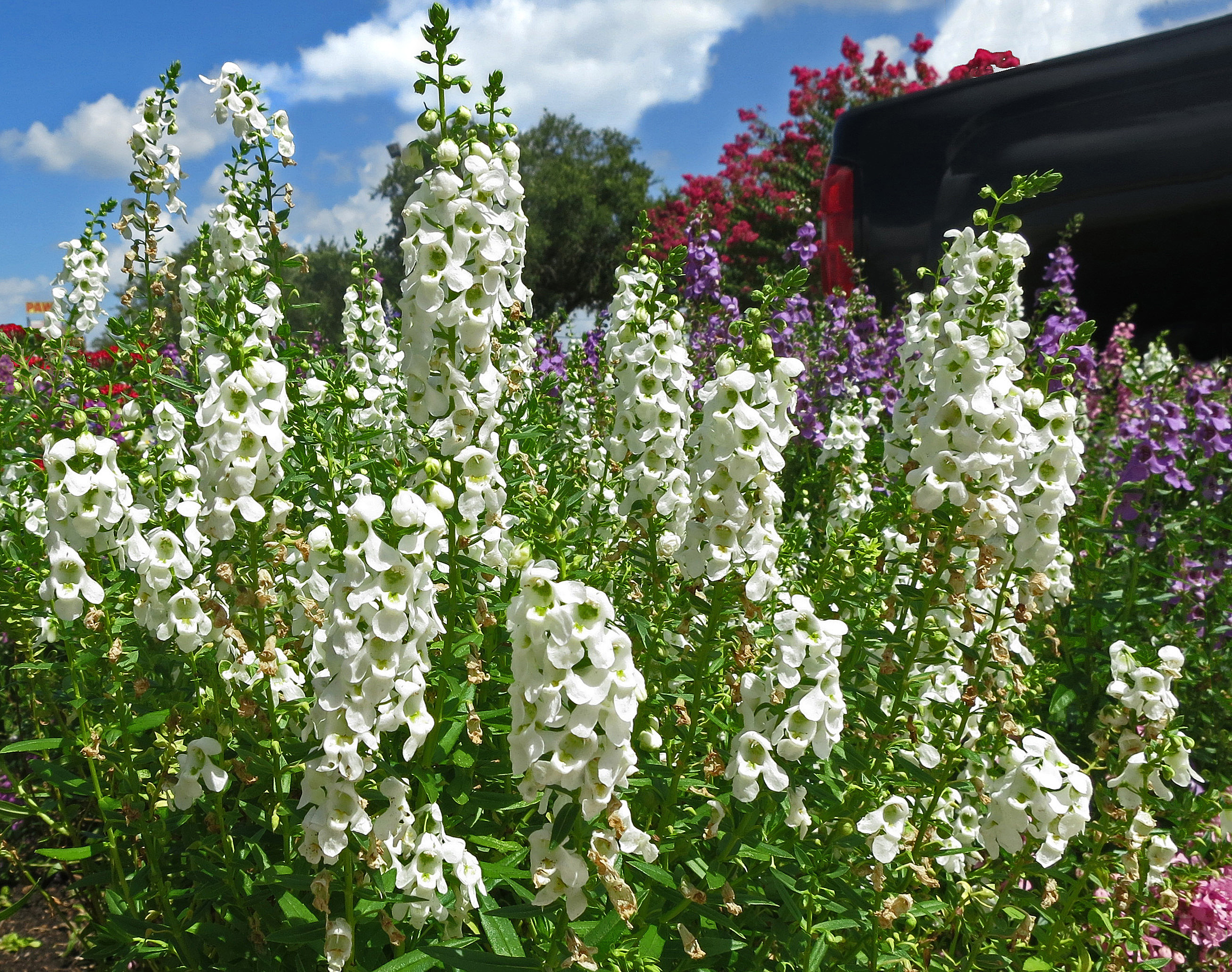
Angelonia

Some species are cultivated as ornamental plants for their snapdragon-like flowers, but need warm temperatures and large amounts of sunlight. Garden varieties are mainly cultivars of A. angustifolia.

== Species ==
29 species are accepted.

- Angelonia acuminatissima Herzog
- Angelonia alternifolia V.C.Souza
- Angelonia angustifolia Benth.
- Angelonia arguta Benth.
- Angelonia biflora Benth.
- Angelonia bisaccata Benth.
- Angelonia blanchetii Benth.
- Angelonia campestris Nees & Mart.
- Angelonia chiquitensis Herzog
- Angelonia ciliaris B.L.Rob.
- Angelonia cornigera Hook.
- Angelonia crassifolia Benth.
- Angelonia eriostachys Benth.
- Angelonia goyazensis Benth.
- Angelonia hookeriana Gardner ex Benth.
- Angelonia integerrima Spreng.
- Angelonia leandrii J.Kickx f.
- Angelonia linarioides Taub.
- Angelonia micrantha Benth.
- Angelonia minor Fisch. & C.A.Mey.
- Angelonia parviflora Barringer
- Angelonia perennis (Hassl.) Scatigna & V.C.Souza
- Angelonia pilosella J.Kickx f.
- Angelonia pratensis Gardner ex Benth.
- Angelonia procumbens Nees & Mart.
- Angelonia pubescens Benth.
- Angelonia salicariifolia Bonpl.
- Angelonia serrata Benth.
- Angelonia tomentosa Moric. ex Benth.
- Angelonia verticillata Philcox
