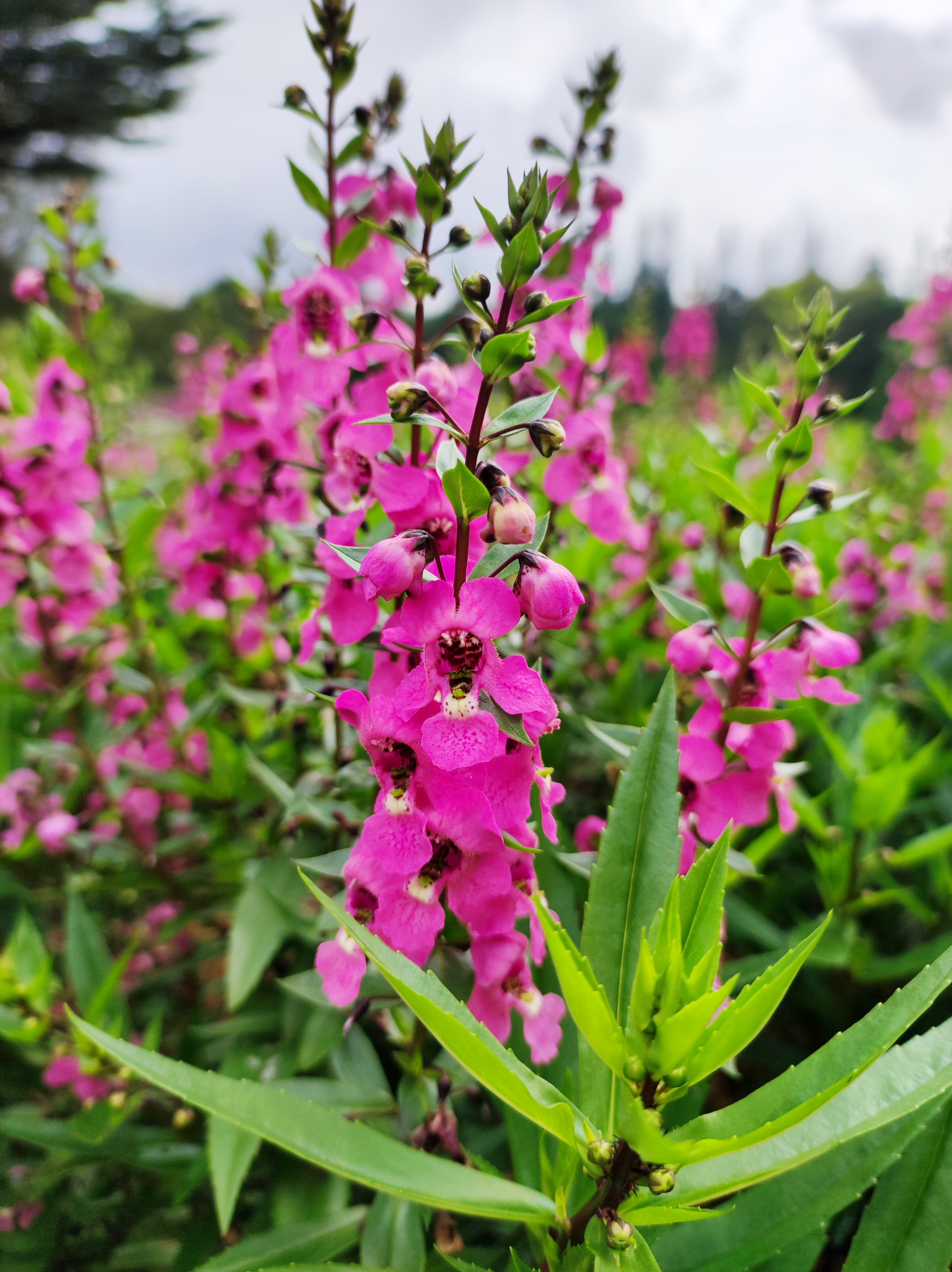

Scientific classification
- Kingdom: Plantae
- Clade: Tracheophytes
- Clade: Angiosperms
- Clade: Eudicots
- Clade: Asterids
- Order: Lamiales
- Family: Plantaginaceae
- Genus: Angelonia
- Species: A. salicariifolia

Binomial name
- Angelonia salicariifolia Humb. & Bonpl., 1812

= Angelonia salicariifolia =

Species of plant

Angelonia salicariifolia is a species of flowering plant in the family Plantaginaceae. This species is native to Bolivia, Brazil, and northeast Argentina.
