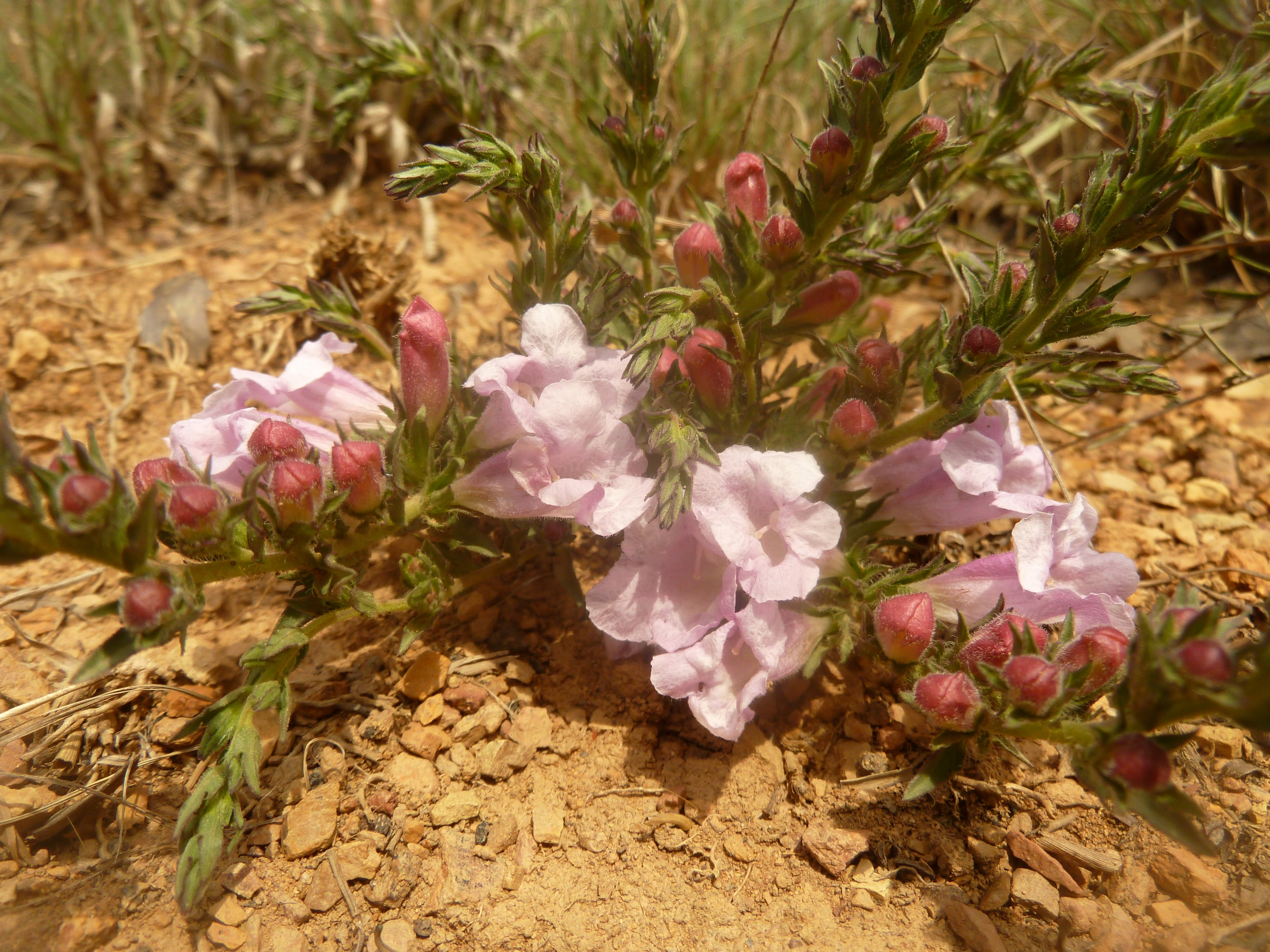

Scientific classification
- Kingdom: Plantae
- Clade: Tracheophytes
- Clade: Angiosperms
- Clade: Eudicots
- Clade: Asterids
- Order: Lamiales
- Family: Orobanchaceae
- Genus: Graderia
- Species: G. subintegra

Binomial name
- Graderia subintegra Mast.

Synonyms
- Heterotypic Synonyms: Bopusia subintegra Hiern

= Graderia subintegra =

Species of flowering plant

Graderia subintegra is a species of plant in the family Orobanchaceae. It is found in grasslands and on rocky outcrops in southern Africa. It flowers from September to November.

== Description ==
A perennial low shrub, growing from a somewhat woody rootstock. The trailing or ascending stems radiate from the crown of the root.
