= Rhamphicarpa =

Scientific classification
- Kingdom: Plantae
- Clade: Tracheophytes
- Clade: Angiosperms
- Clade: Eudicots
- Clade: Asterids
- Order: Lamiales
- Family: Orobanchaceae
- Genus: Rhamphicarpa; Benth.

Genus of plants

Rhamphicarpa is a genus of flowering plants belonging to the family Orobanchaceae.

Its native range is Tropical and Southern Africa, Madagascar, Turkey to the Caucasus, India, New Guinea to Northern Australia.

Species:

- Rhamphicarpa australiensis Steenis
- Rhamphicarpa brevipedicellata O.J.Hansen
- Rhamphicarpa capillacea A.Raynal
- Rhamphicarpa elongata (Hochst.) O.J.Hansen
- Rhamphicarpa fistulosa (Hochst.) Benth.
- Rhamphicarpa medwedewii Albov
