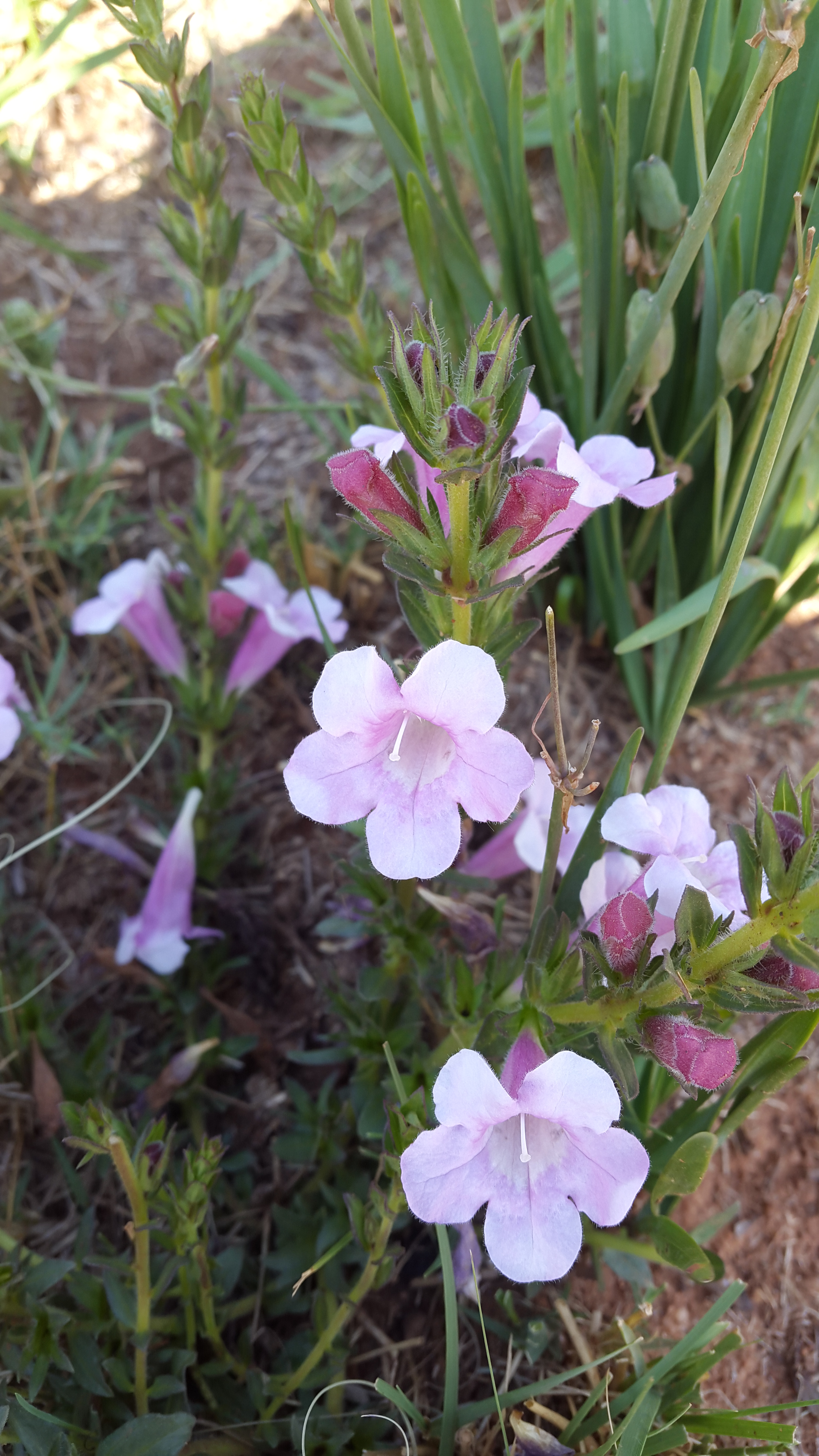
- G. subintegra

Scientific classification
- Kingdom: Plantae
- Clade: Tracheophytes
- Clade: Angiosperms
- Clade: Eudicots
- Clade: Asterids
- Order: Lamiales
- Family: Orobanchaceae
- Tribe: Buchnereae
- Genus: Graderia; Benth.

= Graderia =

Genus of flowering plants in the broomrape family

Graderia is a genus of plants in the family Orobanchaceae, which is native to Africa and Socotra. It belongs to the tribe Buchnereae. It is a hemiparasitic taxon.

== Etymology ==
Graderia is a taxonomic anagram derived from the name of the confamilial genus Gerardia. The latter name is a taxonomic patronym honoring the English botanist John Gerard.

== Description ==
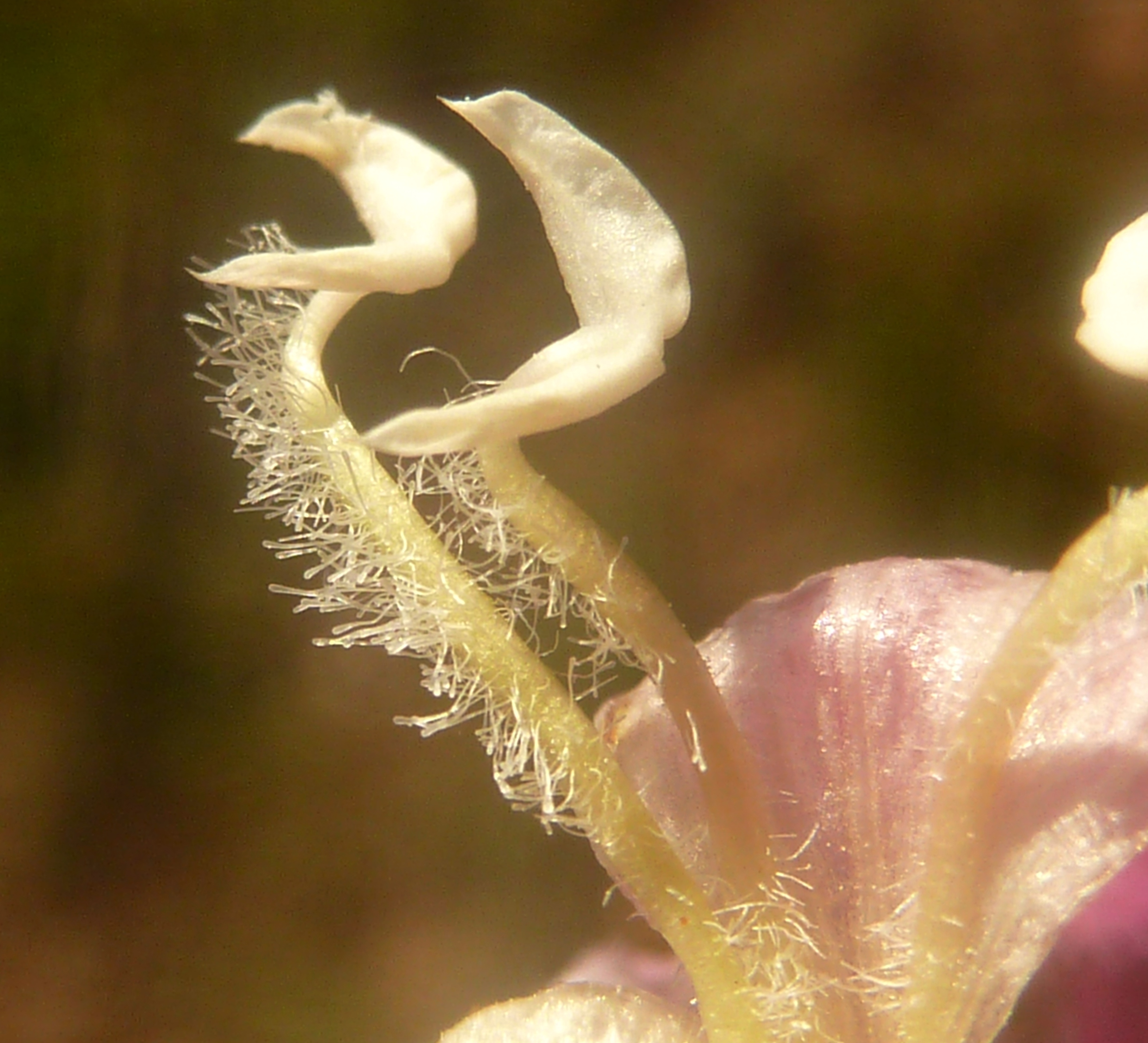
Divergent thecae in G. subintegra

Sometimes a suffrutex with stems growing from a woody rhizome. Leaves may be opposite or alternate. The solitary flowers appear in the axils, and have a five-lobed calyx and corolla. The flower is tubular with four stamens, in pairs of unequal length. Each stamen has two divergent, oblong and curved thecae. The two-locular ovary has numerous ovules, and produces numerous seeds in a fruit capsule.

== Systematics ==
The genus includes some four species.

- Graderia fruticosa Balf.f. is endemic to Socotra.
- Graderia linearifolia Codd
- Graderia scabra Benth.
- Graderia subintegra Mast.
