= Susan Carter Holmes =

British botanist

- Born: Susan Carter; 1933 (age 92–93)
- Scientific career
- Fields: Botany
- Institutions: Royal Botanic Gardens, Kew
- Author abbrev. (botany): S.Carter

Susan Carter Holmes (born 1933) is a botanist and taxonomist. She discovered and catalogued more than 200 plants of the family Euphorbiaceae. Her plants and articles are published under her maiden-name Susan Carter.

== Career ==
Susan Carter Holmes is a botanist and taxonomist at the Royal Botanic Gardens, Kew. She discovered and catalogued more than 200 plants of the family Euphorbiaceae, particularly of the succulent East African members of the genera Euphorbia and Monadenium, as well as about 20 Aloe species.

== Eponyms ==
Plants have been named in honor to Holmes:

- Euphorbia carteriana P.R.O.Bally 1964
- Euphorbia holmesiae Lavranos 1992
- Euphorbia susanholmesiae Binojk. & Gopalan 1993

== Bibliography ==
Articles and plants are published under Holmes's maiden-name Susan Carter. The standard author abbreviation S.Carter is used to indicate this person as the author when citing a botanical name. Works include:

- Carter, Susan (1982), New Succulent Spiny Euphorbias from East Africa, ISBN 1-878762-72-9
- Carter, Susan; Smith, A.L. (1988), "Flora of Tropical East Africa", Euphorbiaceae, ISBN 90-6191-338-1
- Carter, Susan; Eggli, Urs (1997), "The CITES Checklist of Succulent Euphorbia Taxa", Euphorbiaceae, ISBN 3-89624-609-7

== See also ==
- List of Euphorbia species
