= List of Galium species =

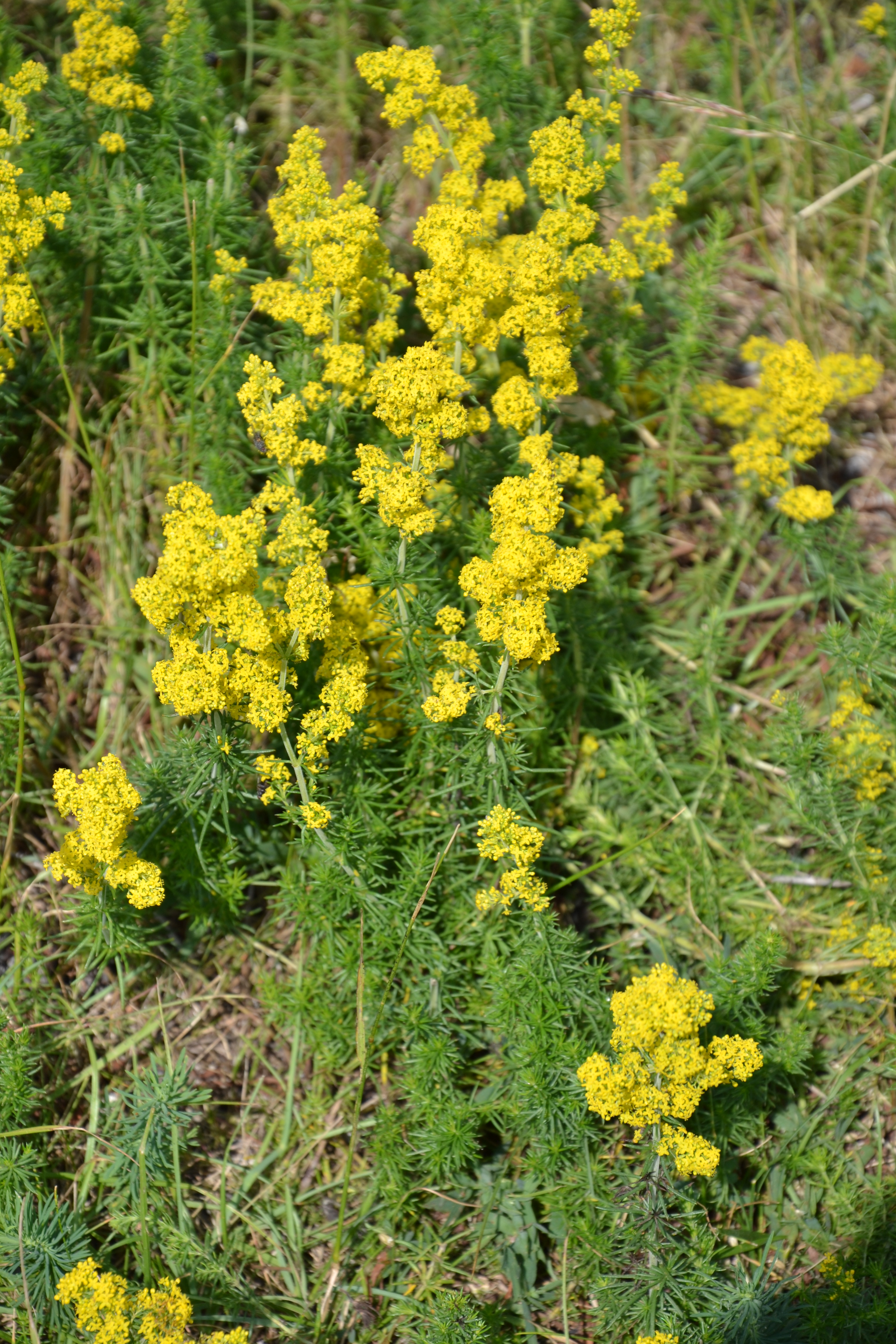
Galium verum ("lady's bedstraw") is the type species of the genus Galium.

The genus Galium (Rubiaceae) contains around 650 species, making it one of the largest genera of flowering plants.

== A ==
- Galium abaujense Borbás
- Galium abruptorum Pomel
- Galium absurdum Krendl
- Galium achurense Grossh.
- Galium acrophyum Hochst. ex Chiov.
- Galium acuminatum Ball
- Galium acutum Edgew.
- Galium adhaerens Boiss. & Balansa in P.E.Boissier
- Galium advenum Krendl
- Galium aegeum (Stoj. & Kitam.) Ancev
- Galium aetnicum Biv.
- Galium afropusillum Ehrend.
- Galium agrophilum Krendl
- Galium aladaghense Parolly
- Galium × alberti Rouy in G.Rouy & J.Foucaud
- Galium albescens Hook.f.
- Galium album Mill.
- Galium amatymbicum Eckl. & Zeyh.
- Galium amblyophyllum Schrenk in F.E.L.von Fischer & C.A.von Meyer
- Galium amorginum Halácsy
- Galium andrewsii A.Gray
- Galium andringitrense Homolle ex Puff
- Galium anfractum Sommier & Levier
- Galium anguineum Ehrend. & Schönb.-Tem.
- Galium angulosum A.Gray
- Galium angustifolium Nutt. in J.Torrey & A.Gray
- Galium angustissimum (Hausskn. ex Bornm.) Ehrend.
- Galium anisophyllon Vill.
- Galium ankaratrense Homolle ex Puff
- Galium antarcticum Hook.f.
- Galium antitauricum Ehrend.
- Galium antuneziae Dempster
- Galium aparine L. Cleavers, sticky weed, et al.
- Galium aparinoides Forssk.
- Galium aragonesii Sennen
- Galium araucanum Phil.
- Galium arenarium Loisel.
- Galium arequipicum Dempster
- Galium aretioides Boiss.
- Galium argense Dempster & Ehrend.
- Galium aristatum L.
- Galium arkansanum A.Gray
- Galium armenum Schanzer
- Galium ascendens Willd. ex Spreng.
- Galium aschenbornii S.Schauer
- Galium asparagifolium Boiss. & Heldr. in P.E.Boissier
- Galium asperifolium Wall. in W.Roxburgh
- Galium asperuloides Edgew.
- Galium asprellum Michx.
- Galium atherodes Spreng.
- Galium atlanticum Pomel
- Galium aucheri Boiss.
- Galium auratum Klokov
- Galium australe DC.
- Galium austriacum Jacq.
- Galium avascense Krendl
- Galium azerbayjanicum Ehrend. & Schönb.-Tem.
- Galium azuayicum Dempster

== B ==
- Galium babadaghense Yıld.
- Galium baeticum (Rouy) Ehrend. & Krendl
- Galium baghlanense Ehrend. & Schönb.-Tem.
- Galium baillonii Brandza
- Galium baldense Spreng.
- Galium baldensiforme Hand.-Mazz.
- Galium balearicum Briq.
- Galium × barcinonense Sennen
- Galium basalticum Ehrend. & Schönb.-Tem.
- Galium baytopianum Ehrend. & Schönb.-Tem.
- Galium beckhausianum G.H.Loos
- Galium belizianum Ortega Oliv.
- Galium bellatulum Klokov
- Galium bermudense L.
- Galium bifolium S.Watson
- Galium bigeminum Griseb.
- Galium binifolium N.A.Wakef.
- Galium blinii H.Lév.
- Galium boissierianum (Steud.) Ehrend. & Krendl
- Galium bolanderi A.Gray
- Galium boreale L.
- Galium boreoaethiopicum Puff
- Galium bornmuelleri Hausskn. ex Bornm.
- Galium bourgaeanum Coss. ex Batt.
- Galium boyacanum Dempster
- Galium brachyphyllum Schult. in J.J.Roemer & J.A.Schultes
- Galium bracteatum Boiss.
- Galium bredasdorpense Puff
- Galium brenanii Ehrend. & Verdc.
- Galium brevifolium Sm. in J.Sibthorp & J.E.Smith
- Galium breviramosum Krendl
- Galium brockmannii Briq.
- Galium broterianum Boiss. & Reut.
- Galium brunneum Munby
- Galium bryoides Merr. & L.M.Perry
- Galium buchtienii Dempster
- Galium × buekkense Hulják
- Galium bullatum Lipsky
- Galium bulliforme I.Thomps.
- Galium bungei Steud.
- Galium bungoniense I.Thomps.
- Galium buschiorum Mikheev
- Galium bussei K.Schum. & K.Krause
- Galium buxifolium Greene

== C ==
- Galium cajamarcense Dempster
- Galium californicum Hook. & Arn.
- Galium caminianum Schult. in J.J.Roemer & J.A.Schultes
- Galium campanelliferum Ehrend. & Schönb.-Tem.
- Galium campylotrichum Nazim. & Ehrend.
- Galium canescens Kunth in F.W.H.von Humboldt
- Galium cankiriense Yıld.
- Galium canum Req. ex DC.
- Galium capense Thunb.
- Galium capitatum Bory & Chaub.
- Galium cappadocicum Boiss.
- Galium caprarium Natali
- Galium capreum Krendl
- Galium carmenicola Dempster
- Galium × carmineum Beauverd
- Galium carterae Dempster
- Galium caspicum Steven
- Galium cassium Boiss.
- Galium catalinense A.Gray
- Galium × centroniae Cariot
- Galium ceratoamanianum Ehrend.
- Galium ceratocarpon Boiss.
- Galium ceratophylloides Hook.f.
- Galium ceratopodum Boiss.
- Galium cespitosum Lam.
- Galium chaetopodum Rech.f.
- Galium chekiangense Ehrend.
- Galium chloroionanthum K.Schum.
- Galium chloroleucum Fisch. & C.A.Mey.
- Galium ciliare Hook.f.
- Galium cilicicum Boiss.
- Galium cinereum All.
- Galium circae Krendl
- Galium circaezans Michx.
- Galium clausonis Pomel
- Galium clementis Eastw.
- Galium cliftonsmithii (Dempster) Dempster & Stebbins
- Galium collomiae J.T.Howell
- Galium coloradoense W.Wight
- Galium comari H.Lév. & Vaniot
- Galium comberi Dempster
- Galium cometerhizon Lapeyr.
- Galium compactum Ehrend. & McGill.
- Galium concatenatum Coss.
- Galium concinnum Torr. & A.Gray
- Galium confertum Royle ex Hook.f.
- Galium conforme Krendl
- Galium consanguineum Boiss.
- Galium coriaceum Bunge in C.F.von Ledebour
- Galium cornigerum Boiss. & Hausskn. in P.E.Boissier
- Galium coronadoense Dempster
- Galium correllii Dempster
- Galium corsicum Spreng.
- Galium corymbosum Ruiz & Pav.
- Galium cossonianum Jafri
- Galium cotinoides Cham. & Schltdl.
- Galium cracoviense Ehrend.
- Galium crassifolium W.C.Chen
- Galium craticulatum R.R.Mill
- Galium crespianum Rodr.
- Galium cryptanthum Hemsl.
- Galium curvihirtum Ehrend. & McGill.
- Galium cuspidulatum Miq.
- Galium cyllenium Boiss. & Heldr. in P.E.Boissier
- Galium czerepanovii Pobed. in V.L.Komarov

== D ==
- Galium dahuricum Turcz. ex Ledeb.
- Galium davisii Ehrend.
- Galium debile Desv.
- Galium decorum Krendl
- Galium decumbens (Ehrend.) Ehrend. & Schönb.-Tem.
- Galium degenii Bald. ex Degen
- Galium deistelii K.Krause
- Galium delicatulum Boiss. & Hohen. in P.E.Boissier
- Galium demissum Boiss.
- Galium dempsterae B.L.Turner
- Galium densum Hook.f.
- Galium denticulatum Bartl. ex DC.
- Galium desereticum Dempster & Ehrend.
- Galium diabolense Dempster
- Galium dieckii Bornm.
- Galium diffusoramosum Dempster & Ehrend.
- Galium × digeneum A.Kern.
- Galium diphyllum (K.Schum.) Dempster
- Galium diploprion Boiss. & Hohen. in P.E.Boissier
- Galium divaricatum Pourr. ex Lam.
- Galium domingense Iltis
- Galium dumosum Boiss.
- Galium duthiei R.Bhattacharjee

== E ==
- Galium echinocarpum Hayata
- Galium ecuadoricum Dempster
- Galium × effulgens Beck
- Galium ehrenbergii Boiss.
- Galium elbursense Bornm. & Gauba
- Galium elegans Wall. ex Roxb.
- Galium elongatum C.Presl in J.S.Presl & C.B.Presl
- Galium emeryense Dempster & Ehrend.
- Galium ephedroides Willk.
- Galium equisetoides (Cham. & Schltdl.) Standl.
- Galium ericoides Lam.
- Galium eriocarpum Bartl. ex DC.
- Galium eruptivum Krendl
- Galium erythrorrhizon Boiss. & Reut.
- Galium espiniacicum Dempster
- Galium estebanii Sennen
- Galium exaltatum Krendl
- Galium exile Hook.f.
- Galium exstipulatum P.H.Davis
- Galium exsurgens Ehrend. & Schönb.-Tem.
- Galium extensum Krendl

== F ==
- Galium falconeri R.Bhattacharjee
- Galium fendleri A.Gray
- Galium ferrugineum K.Krause
- Galium festivum Krendl
- Galium × fictum E.G.Camus in G.Rouy & J.Foucaud
- Galium filipes Rydb.
- Galium firmum Tausch
- Galium fissurense Ehrend. & Schönb.-Tem.
- Galium fistulosum Sommier & Levier
- Galium flavescens Borbás ex Simonk. in A.J.R.Kerner
- Galium flaviflorum (Trautv.) Mikheev
- Galium floribundum Sm. in J.Sibthorp & J.E.Smith
- Galium foliosum Munby ex Burnat & Barbey
- Galium fontanesianum Pomel
- Galium formosense Ohwi
- Galium forrestii Diels
- Galium fosbergii Dempster
- Galium friedrichii N.Torres & al.
- Galium fruticosum Willd.
- Galium fuegianum Hook.f.
- Galium fuscum M.Martens & Galeotti

== G ==
- Galium galapagoense Wiggins
- Galium galiopsis (Hand.-Mazz.) Ehrend.
- Galium gaudichaudii DC.
- Galium geminiflorum Lowe
- Galium ghilanicum Stapf
- Galium gilliesii Hook. & Arn.
- Galium glaberrimum Hemsl.
- Galium glabrescens (Ehrend.) Dempster & Ehrend.
- Galium glabriusculum Ehrend.
- Galium glaciale K.Krause
- Galium glandulosum Hand.-Mazz.
- Galium glaucophyllum Em.Schmid
- Galium glaucum L.
- Galium globuliferum Hub.-Mor. & Reese
- Galium gracilicaule Bacigalupo & Ehrend.
- Galium graecum L.
- Galium grande McClatchie
- Galium grayanum Ehrend.
- Galium guadalupense (Spreng.) Govaerts
- Galium gymnopetalum Ehrend. & Schönb.-Tem.

== H ==
- Galium hainesii Schönb.-Tem.
- Galium hallii Munz & I.M.Johnst.
- Galium hardhamiae Dempster
- Galium hatschbachii Dempster
- Galium haussknechtii Ehrend.
- Galium heldreichii Halácsy
- Galium hellenicum Krendl
- Galium hexanarium Knjaz.
- Galium hierochuntinum Bornm.
- Galium hierosolymitanum L.
- Galium hilendiae Dempster & Ehrend.
- Galium × himmelbaurianum (Ronniger) Soó
- Galium hintoniorum B.L.Turner
- Galium hirtiflorum Req. ex DC.
- Galium hirtum Lam.
- Galium hoffmeisteri (Klotzsch) Ehrend. & Schönb.-Tem. ex R.R.Mill
- Galium homblei De Wild.
- Galium huancavelicum Dempster
- Galium huber-morathii Ehrend. & Schönb.-Tem.
- Galium humifusum M.Bieb.
- Galium humile Cham. & Schltdl.
- Galium × hungaricum A.Kern.
- Galium hupehense Pamp.
- Galium × huteri A.Kern.
- Galium hypocarpium (L.) Endl. ex Griseb.
- Galium hypotrichium A.Gray
- Galium hypoxylon Ehrend. & Schönb.-Tem.
- Galium hyrcanicum C.A.Mey.
- Galium hystricocarpum Greenm.
- Galium idubedae (Pau & Debeaux) Pau ex Ehrend.

== I ==
- Galium iltisii Dempster
- Galium incanum Sm. in J.Sibthorp & J.E.Smith
- Galium inconspicuum Phil.
- Galium incrassatum Halácsy
- Galium incurvum Sm. in J.Sibthorp & J.E.Smith
- Galium innocuum Miq.
- Galium insulare Krendl
- Galium intermedium Schult.
- Galium intricatum Margot & Reut.
- Galium ionicum Krendl
- Galium iranicum Hausskn. ex Bornm.
- Galium irinae Pachom.
- Galium isauricum Ehrend. & Schönb.-Tem.

== J ==
- Galium × jansenii Kloos
- Galium japonicum Makino
- Galium × jarynae Wol.
- Galium javalambrense López Udias
- Galium javanicum Blume
- Galium jemense Kotschy
- Galium jepsonii Hilend & J.T.Howell
- Galium johnstonii Dempster & Stebbins
- Galium jolyi Batt.
- Galium judaicum Boiss.
- Galium jungermannioides Boiss.
- Galium junghuhnianum Miq.
- Galium juniperinum Standl.

== K ==
- Galium kaganense R.Bhattacharjee
- Galium kahelianum Deflers
- Galium kamtschaticum Steller ex Schult. in J.J.Roemer & J.A.Schultes
- Galium karakulense Pobed. in V.L.Komarov
- Galium karataviense (Pavlov) Pobed.
- Galium kasachstanicum Pachom.
- Galium kenyanum Verdc.
- Galium kerneri Degen & Dörfl.
- Galium khorasanense Griff.
- Galium kikumugura Ohwi
- Galium killipii Dempster & Ehrend.
- Galium kinuta Nakai & H.Hara
- Galium kitaibelianum Schult. in J.J.Roemer & J.A.Schultes
- Galium × kondratjukii Ostapko
- Galium kuetzingii Boiss. & Buhse
- Galium kunmingense Ehrend.
- Galium kurdicum Boiss. & Hohen. in P.E.Boissier

== L ==
- Galium labradoricum (Wiegand) Wiegand
- Galium laconicum Boiss. & Heldr. in P.E.Boissier
- Galium lacrimiforme Dempster
- Galium laevigatum L.
- Galium lahulense Ehrend. & Schönb.-Tem.
- Galium lanceolatum (Torr. & A.Gray) Torr.
- Galium lanuginosum Lam.
- Galium × lanulosum Ostapko
- Galium lasiocarpum Boiss.
- Galium latifolium Michx.
- Galium latoramosum Clos in C.Gay
- Galium leiocarpum I.Thomps.
- Galium leptogonium I.Thomps.
- Galium leptum Phil.
- Galium libanoticum Ehrend.
- Galium lilloi Hicken
- Galium × lindbergii Giraudias
- Galium linearifolium Turcz.
- Galium liratum N.A.Wakef.
- Galium litorale Guss.
- Galium lovcense Urum.
- Galium lucidum All.

== M ==
- Galium macedonicum Krendl
- Galium magellanicum Hook.f.
- Galium magellense Ten.
- Galium magnifolium (Dempster) Dempster
- Galium mahadivense G.Singh
- Galium malickyi Krendl
- Galium mandonii Britton
- Galium maneauense P.Royen
- Galium marchandii Roem. & Schult.
- Galium margaceum Ehrend. & Schönb.-Tem.
- Galium margaritaceum A.Kern.
- Galium maritimum L.
- Galium martirense Dempster & Stebbins
- Galium masafueranum Skottsb.
- Galium matthewsii A.Gray
- Galium maximowiczii (Kom.) Pobed.
- Galium mechudoense Dempster
- Galium megacyttarion R.R.Mill
- Galium megalanthum Boiss.
- Galium megalospermum All.
- Galium megapotamicum Spreng.
- Galium melanantherum Boiss.
- Galium meliodorum (Beck) Fritsch
- Galium membranaceum Ehrend.
- Galium mexicanum Kunth in F.W.H.von Humboldt
- Galium microchiasma Gilli
- Galium microlobum I.Thomps.
- Galium microphyllum A.Gray
- Galium migrans Ehrend. & McGill.
- Galium minutissimum T.Shimizu
- Galium minutulum Jord.
- Galium mirum Rech.f.
- Galium mite Boiss. & Hohen. in P.E.Boissier
- Galium moldavicum (Dobrocz.) Franco
- Galium mollugo L.
- Galium monachinii Boiss. & Heldr. in P.E.Boissier
- Galium monasterium Krendl
- Galium monticola Sond. in W.H.Harvey & auct. suc. (eds.)
- Galium montis-arerae Merxm. & Ehrend.
- Galium moranii Dempster
- Galium morii Hayata
- Galium mucroniferum Sond. in W.H.Harvey & auct. suc. (eds.)
- Galium muelleri (K.Schum.) Dempster
- Galium multiflorum Kellogg
- Galium munzii Hilend & J.T.Howell
- Galium murale (L.) All.
- Galium murbeckii Maire
- Galium muricatum W.Wight
- Galium × mutabile Besser

== N ==
- Galium nabelekii Ehrend. & Schönb.-Tem.
- Galium nakaii Kudô
- Galium nankotaizanum Ohwi
- Galium × neglectum Le Gall ex Gren. & Godr.
- Galium nepalense Ehrend. & Schönb.-Tem.
- Galium nevadense Boiss. & Reut. in P.E.Boissier
- Galium nigdeense Yıld.
- Galium nigricans Boiss.
- Galium nigroramosum (Ehrend.) Dempster
- Galium nolitangere Ball
- Galium noricum Ehrend.
- Galium normanii Dahl
- Galium novoguineense Diels
- Galium noxium (A.St.-Hil.) Dempster
- Galium numidicum Pomel
- Galium nupercreatum Popov
- Galium nuttallii A.Gray

== O ==
- Galium obliquum Vill.
- Galium obovatum Kunth in F.W.H.von Humboldt
- Galium obtusum Bigelow
- Galium octonarium (Klokov) Pobed.
- Galium odoratum (L.) Scop.
- Galium oelandicum Ehrend.
- Galium olgae Klokov
- Galium olivetorum Le Houér
- Galium olympicum Boiss.
- Galium ophiolithicum Krendl
- Galium oreganum Britton
- Galium oreophilum Krendl
- Galium oresbium Greenm.
- Galium orizabense Hemsl.
- Galium oshtenicum Ehrend. & Schanzer ex Mikheev
- Galium ossirwaense K.Krause
- Galium ostenianum (Standl.) Dempster
- Galium ovalleanum Phil.

== P ==
- Galium pabulosum Sommier & Levier
- Galium palaeoitalicum Ehrend.
- Galium palustre L.
- Galium pamiroalaicum Pobed. in V.L.Komarov
- Galium pamphylicum Boiss. & Heldr. in P.E.Boissier
- Galium paniculatum (Bunge) Pobed.
- Galium papilliferum Ehrend. & Schönb.-Tem.
- Galium papillosum Lapeyr.
- Galium papuanum Wernham
- Galium paradoxum Maxim.
- Galium parishii Hilend & J.T.Howell
- Galium parisiense L.
- Galium parvulum Hub.-Mor. ex Ehrend. & Schönb.-Tem.
- Galium paschale Forssk.
- Galium pastorale Krendl
- Galium patzkeanum G.H.Loos
- Galium peloponnesiacum Ehrend. & Krendl
- Galium penduliflorum Boiss.
- Galium pendulum Greenm.
- Galium penicillatum Boiss.
- Galium pennellii Dempster
- Galium peplidifolium Boiss.
- Galium perralderi Coss.
- Galium peruvianum Dempster & Ehrend.
- Galium pestalozzae Boiss.
- Galium petrae Oliv. ex Hart
- Galium philippianum Dempster
- Galium philippinense Merr.
- Galium philistaeum Boiss.
- Galium pilosum Aiton
- Galium pisiferum Boiss.
- Galium pisoderium Krendl
- Galium platygalium (Maxim.) Pobed.
- Galium plumosum Rusby
- Galium poiretianum Ball
- Galium pojarkovae Pobed. in V.L.Komarov
- Galium polyacanthum (Baker) Puff
- Galium polyanthum I.Thomps.
- Galium × pomeranicum Retz.
- Galium porrigens Dempster
- Galium praemontanum Mardal.
- Galium praetermissum Greenm.
- Galium × pralognense Beauverd
- Galium prattii Cufod.
- Galium pringlei Greenm.
- Galium problematicum (Ehrend.) Ehrend. & Schönb.-Tem.
- Galium procurrens Ehrend.
- Galium productum Lowe
- Galium × prolazense Nyár.
- Galium proliferum A.Gray
- Galium propinquum A.Cunn.
- Galium pruinosum Boiss.
- Galium pseudoaristatum Schur
- Galium × pseudoboreale Klokov
- Galium pseudocapitatum Hub.-Mor. ex Ehrend. & Schönb.-Tem.
- Galium pseudohelveticum Ehrend.
- Galium pseudokurdicum (Ehrend.) Schönb.-Tem.
- Galium pseudorivale Tzvelev
- Galium pseudotriflorum Dempster & Ehrend.
- Galium psilocladum Ehrend.
- Galium pterocarpum Ehrend.
- Galium pulvinatum Boiss.
- Galium pumilio Standl.
- Galium pumilum Murray
- Galium pusillosetosum H.Hara
- Galium pusillum L.
- Galium pyrenaicum Gouan

== Q ==
- Galium qaradaghense Schönb.-Tem.
- Galium × querceticola Wol.
- Galium quichense Dempster

== R ==
- Galium radulifolium Ehrend. & Schönb.-Tem.
- Galium ramboi Dempster
- Galium rebae R.R.Mill
- Galium reiseri Halácsy
- Galium × retzii Bouchard
- Galium rhodopeum Velen.
- Galium richardianum (Gillies ex Hook. & Arn.) Endl. ex Walp.
- Galium rigidifolium Krendl
- Galium rivale (Sm.) Griseb.
- Galium roddii Ehrend. & McGill.
- Galium rosellum (Boiss.) Boiss. & Reut.
- Galium rotundifolium L.
- Galium rourkei Puff
- Galium rubidiflorum Dempster
- Galium rubioides L.
- Galium rubrum L.
- Galium runcinatum Ehrend. & Schönb.-Tem.
- Galium rupifragum Ehrend.
- Galium ruwenzoriense (Cortesi) Ehrend.
- Galium rzedowskii Dempster

== S ==
- Galium sacrorum Krendl
- Galium saipalense Ehrend. & Schönb.-Tem.
- Galium salsugineum Krylov & Serg.
- Galium salwinense Hand.-Mazz.
- Galium samium Krendl
- Galium samuelssonii Ehrend.
- Galium saturejifolium Trevir.
- Galium saurense Litv.
- Galium saxatile L.
- Galium saxosum (Chaix) Breistr.
- Galium scabrelloides Puff
- Galium scabrellum K.Schum.
- Galium scabrifolium (Boiss.) Hausskn.
- Galium scabrum L.
- Galium schlumbergeri Boiss.
- Galium × schmidelyi Chenevard & W.Wolf
- Galium schmidii Arrigoni
- Galium × schneebergense Ronniger
- Galium schoenbeck-temesyae Ehrend.
- Galium scioanum Chiov.
- Galium scopulorum Schönb.-Tem.
- Galium seatonii Greenm.
- Galium sellowianum (Cham.) Walp.
- Galium semiamictum Klokov
- Galium serpenticum Dempster
- Galium serpylloides Royle ex Hook.f.
- Galium setaceum Lam.
- Galium setuliferum Ehrend. & Schönb.-Tem.
- Galium shanense R.Bhattacharjee
- Galium shepardii Post
- Galium shepherdii Jung-Mend.
- Galium sichuanense Ehrend.
- Galium sidamense Chiov. ex Chiarugi
- Galium sieheanum Ehrend.
- Galium simense Fresen.
- Galium similii Pavlov
- Galium sinaicum (Delile ex Decne.) Boiss.
- Galium smithreitzii Dempster
- Galium sojakii Ehrend. & Schönb.-Tem.
- Galium songaricum Schrenk in F.E.L.von Fischer & C.A.von Meyer
- Galium sorgerae Ehrend. & Schönb.-Tem.
- Galium sparsiflorum W.Wight
- Galium spathulatum I.Thomps.
- Galium speciosum Krendl
- Galium sphagnophilum (Greenm.) Dempster
- Galium spurium L.
- Galium stebbinsii ined.
- Galium stellatum Kellogg
- Galium stenophyllum Baker
- Galium stepparum Ehrend. & Schönb.-Tem.
- Galium sterneri Ehrend.
- Galium subfalcatum Nazim. & Ehrend.
- Galium subnemorale Klokov & Zaver.
- Galium subtrifidum Reinw. ex Blume
- Galium subtrinervium Ehrend. & Schönb.-Tem.
- Galium subuliferum Sommier & Levier
- Galium subvelutinum (DC.) K.Koch
- Galium subvillosum Sond. in W.H.Harvey & auct. suc. (eds.)
- Galium sudeticum Tausch
- Galium suecicum (Sterner) Ehrend.
- Galium suffruticosum Hook. & Arn.
- Galium sungpanense Cufod.
- Galium surinamense Dempster
- Galium sylvaticum L.

== T ==
- Galium taiwanense Masam.
- Galium takasagomontanum Masam.
- Galium talaveranum Ortega Oliv. & Devesa
- Galium tanganyikense Ehrend. & Verdc.
- Galium tarokoense Hayata
- Galium taygeteum Krendl
- Galium tendae Rchb.f. in H.G.L.Reichenbach
- Galium tenuissimum M.Bieb.
- Galium terrae-reginae Ehrend. & McGill.
- Galium tetraphyllum Nazim. & Ehrend.
- Galium texense A.Gray
- Galium thasium Stoj. & Kitanov
- Galium thiebautii Ehrend.
- Galium thracicum Krendl
- Galium thunbergianum Eckl. & Zeyh.
- Galium thymifolium Boiss. & Heldr. in P.E.Boissier
- Galium tianschanicum Popov
- Galium timeroyi Jord.
- Galium tinctorium L.
- Galium tmoleum Boiss.
- Galium tokyoense Makino
- Galium tolosianum Boiss. & Kotschy in P.E.Boissier
- Galium tomentosum Thunb.
- Galium tortumense Ehrend. & Schönb.-Tem.
- Galium transcarpaticum Stojko & Tasenk.
- Galium trichocarpum DC.
- Galium tricornutum Dandy
- Galium trifidum L.
- Galium trifloriforme Kom.
- Galium triflorum Michx.
- Galium trilobum Colenso
- Galium trinioides Pomel
- Galium trojanum Ehrend.
- Galium truniacum (Ronniger) Ronniger in A.J.R.Kerner von Marilaun
- Galium tubiflorum Ehrend.
- Galium tuncelianum Yıld.
- Galium tunetanum Lam.
- Galium turgaicum Knjaz.
- Galium turkestanicum Pobed. in V.L.Komarov
- Galium tyraicum Klokov

== U ==
- Galium uliginosum L.
- Galium uncinulatum DC.
- Galium undulatum Puff
- Galium uniflorum Michx.
- Galium uruguayense Bacigalupo

== V ==
- Galium valantioides M.Bieb.
- Galium valdepilosum Heinr.Braun
- Galium valentinum Lange
- Galium vartanii Grossh.
- Galium vassilczenkoi Pobed. in V.L.Komarov
- Galium velenovskyi Ancev
- Galium verrucosum Huds.
- Galium verticillatum Danthoine ex Lam.
- Galium verum L.
- Galium × viciosorum Sennen & Pau
- Galium vile (Cham. & Schltdl.) Dempster
- Galium virgatum Nutt. in J.Torrey & A.Gray
- Galium viridiflorum Boiss. & Reut.
- Galium viscosum Vahl
- Galium volcanense Dempster
- Galium volhynicum Pobed.

== W ==
- Galium watsonii (A.Gray) A.Heller
- Galium weberbaueri K.Krause
- Galium wendelboi Ehrend. & Schönb.-Tem.
- Galium werdermannii Standl.
- Galium wigginsii Dempster
- Galium wrightii A.Gray

== X ==
- Galium xeroticum (Klokov) Pobed.
- Galium xylorrhizum Boiss. & A.Huet in P.E.Boissier

== Y ==
- Galium yunnanense H.Hara & C.Y.Wu

== Z ==
- Galium zabense Ehrend.
