= Galium sparsiflorum =

Sequoia bedstraw

Scientific classification
- Kingdom: Plantae
- Clade: Tracheophytes
- Clade: Angiosperms
- Clade: Eudicots
- Clade: Asterids
- Order: Gentianales
- Family: Rubiaceae
- Genus: Galium
- Species: G. sparsiflorum

Binomial name
- Galium sparsiflorum W.Wight

Species of plant

Galium sparsiflorum is a species of flowering plant in the coffee family known by the common name Sequoia bedstraw. It is endemic to California, where it grows in shaded habitat in certain mountain ranges, including the Sierra Nevada.

Galium sparsiflorum is a perennial herb forming tufts of erect stems 30 to 50 centimeters tall with woody bases. The stems are ringed with whorls of four rounded to oval leaves each up to 2.5 centimeters long. The plant is dioecious, with male plants bearing clusters of flowers and female plants with usually solitary flowers in leaf axils.

== Subspecies ==
Two subspecies are recognized (May 2014):

- Galium sparsiflorum subsp. glabrius Dempster & Stebbins - northwestern California
- Galium sparsiflorum subsp. sparsiflorum - central California
