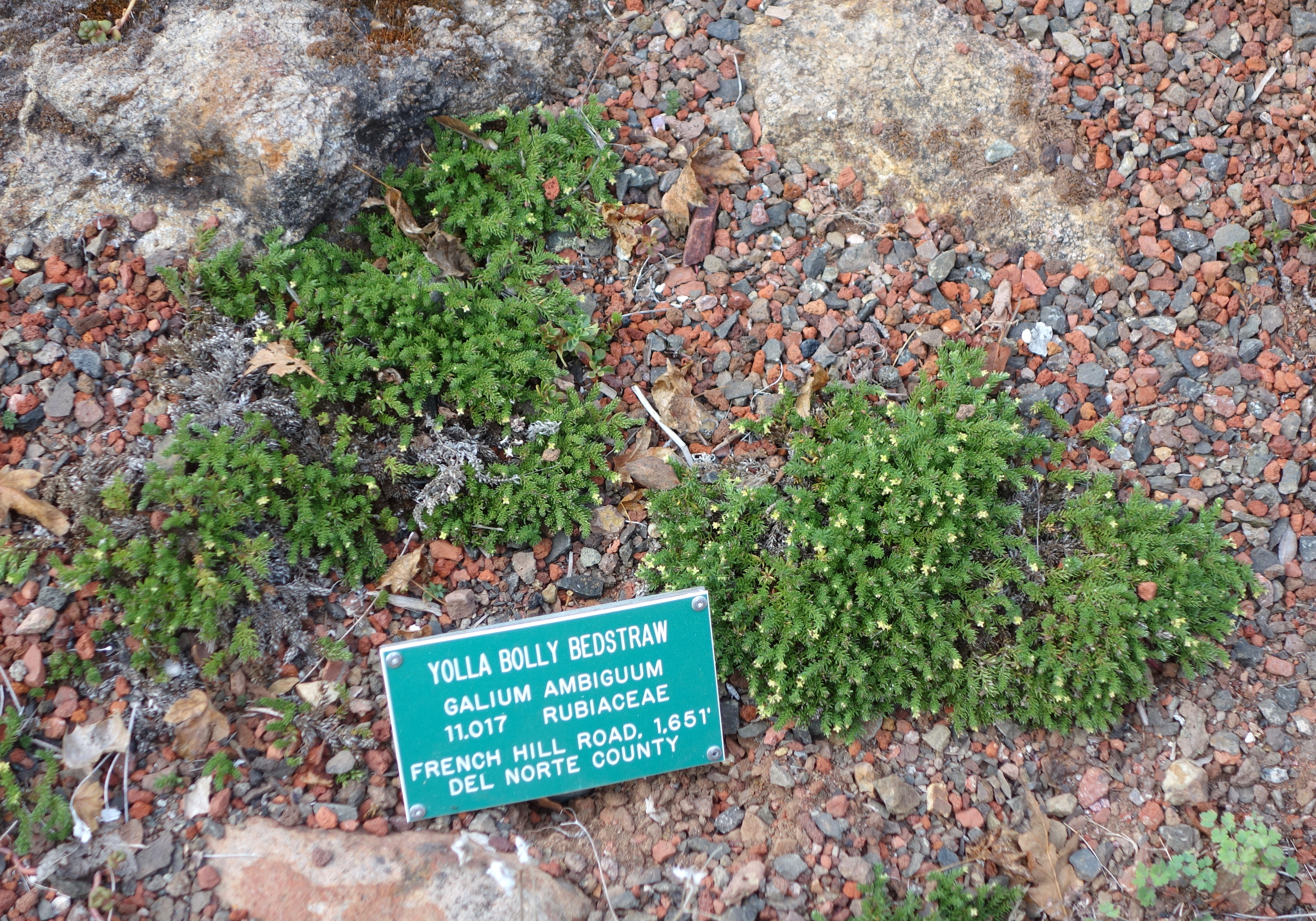

Scientific classification
- Kingdom: Plantae
- Clade: Tracheophytes
- Clade: Angiosperms
- Clade: Eudicots
- Clade: Asterids
- Order: Gentianales
- Family: Rubiaceae
- Genus: Galium
- Species: G. ambiguum

Binomial name
- Galium ambiguum W.Wight

= Galium ambiguum =

Yolla Bolly bedstraw

Species of plant

Yolla Bolly bedstraw is a species of plant in the family Rubiaceae, native to British Columbia, northern California and southeastern Oregon, where it often grows on serpentine soils.

== Etymology ==
It has for years been known by the scientific name Galium ambiguum, but under the international rules of nomenclature this use of the name is unacceptable because it was already used for a French plant before Wight applied it to this American species. The provisional name Galium stebbinsii has been suggested, but this is at yet unpublished (as of June 2025), so another name could eventually be chosen instead.

== Description ==
Yolla Bolly bedstraw is a hairy, mat-forming perennial herb producing clumps of small green stems up to about 15 centimeters long. The stems have whorls of four narrow, pointed linear leaves each. The plant is dioecious, with individuals bearing either male or female flowers. The staminate flowers are borne in clusters, while the pistillate flowers appear singly in leaf axils; both types of flower are yellow-green in color.
