= Galium × carmineum =

Scientific classification
- Kingdom: Plantae
- Clade: Tracheophytes
- Clade: Angiosperms
- Clade: Eudicots
- Clade: Asterids
- Order: Gentianales
- Family: Rubiaceae
- Genus: Galium
- Species: G. × carmineum

Binomial name
- Galium × carmineum Beauverd

Species of plant

Galium × carmineum, common name carmine bedstraw, is a species of the Rubiaceae. It is apparently of hybrid origin though established in the wild, a 3-way cross between G. anisophyllon × G. pumilum × G. rubrum. It is native to mountainous regions of France, Switzerland and Italy (Lombardia, Trentino-Alto Adige, Veneto, Emilia-Romagna, Toscana).
