= Galium × centroniae =

Hybrid bedstraw

Scientific classification
- Kingdom: Plantae
- Clade: Tracheophytes
- Clade: Angiosperms
- Clade: Eudicots
- Clade: Asterids
- Order: Gentianales
- Family: Rubiaceae
- Genus: Galium
- Species: G. × centroniae

Binomial name
- Galium × centroniae Cariot

Species of plant

Galium × centroniae, common name hybrid bedstraw, is a species of the family Rubiaceae. It is apparently of hybrid origin though established in the wild, a cross between G. pumilum × G. rubrum. It is native to mountainous regions of France, Switzerland, Austria, Slovenia, Croatia, and Italy (Valle d'Aosta, Lombardia, Trentino-Alto Adige, Veneto, Friuli-Venezia Giulia, Emilia-Romagna, Toscana).
