= Galium desereticum =

Deseret bedstraw

Scientific classification
- Kingdom: Plantae
- Clade: Tracheophytes
- Clade: Angiosperms
- Clade: Eudicots
- Clade: Asterids
- Order: Gentianales
- Family: Rubiaceae
- Genus: Galium
- Species: G. desereticum

Binomial name
- Galium desereticum Dempster & Ehrend.

Species of plant

Galium desereticum is a plant species in the Rubiaceae. It is native to the states of Nevada and Utah in the southwestern United States.

The species is named for Deseret, a provisional state of the United States proposed by early settlers in the region; it comprised most of present-day Utah and Nevada plus sections of surrounding states.
