= Galium aetnicum =

Mount Aetna bedstraw

Scientific classification
- Kingdom: Plantae
- Clade: Tracheophytes
- Clade: Angiosperms
- Clade: Eudicots
- Clade: Asterids
- Order: Gentianales
- Family: Rubiaceae
- Genus: Galium
- Species: G. aetnicum

Binomial name
- Galium aetnicum Biv.

Species of plant

Galium aetnicum (common name Mount Aetna bedstraw) is a plant species in the Rubiaceae. The species is named for Mount Etna, the large and active volcano on the island of Sicily in the Mediterranean. The species is native to the island, and also to the Lazio and Abruzzo regions of mainland Italy. There are reports of the plant growing in Sardinia as well, but these are unconfirmed.

Galium aetnicum is larger than most other species in the genus, with a showy panicle of white flowers.
