= Galium orizabense =

Bald bedstraw

Conservation status
- Secure (NatureServe)

Scientific classification
- Kingdom: Plantae
- Clade: Embryophytes
- Clade: Tracheophytes
- Clade: Angiosperms
- Clade: Eudicots
- Clade: Asterids
- Order: Gentianales
- Family: Rubiaceae
- Genus: Galium
- Species: G. orizabense

Binomial name
- Galium orizabense Hemsl.

Species of plant

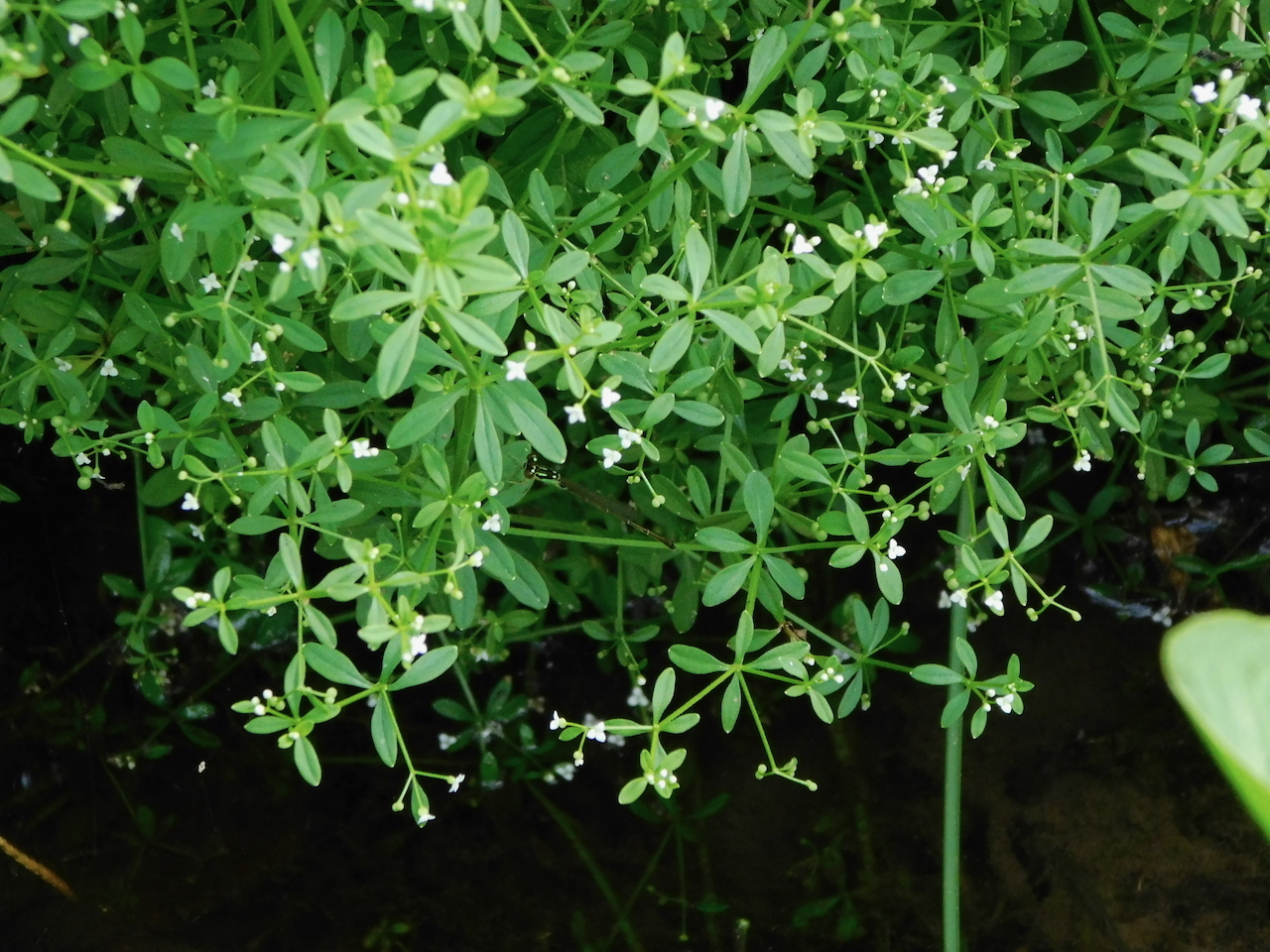
Galium orizabense laevicaule growing in the United States

Galium orizabense (bald bedstraw) is a species of plants in the family Rubiaceae, named for the town of Orizaba in Veracruz, where the first collections of the species were made. The species is native to Mexico (from Sinaloa + Nuevo León south to Oaxaca), Costa Rica, Guatemala, Panama, Venezuela, Colombia, and Hispaniola, plus widely scattered locations in the southeastern United States.

== Subspecies ==
Two subspecies are recognized (May 2014).

- Galium orizabense subsp. laevicaule (Weath. & Blake) Dempster - United States and Hispaniola
- Galium orizabense subsp. orizabense - Mexico, Central America, South America
