= Galium azuayicum =

Conservation status
- Vulnerable (IUCN 3.1)

Scientific classification
- Kingdom: Plantae
- Clade: Tracheophytes
- Clade: Angiosperms
- Clade: Eudicots
- Clade: Asterids
- Order: Gentianales
- Family: Rubiaceae
- Genus: Galium
- Species: G. azuayicum

Binomial name
- Galium azuayicum Dempster

Species of plant

Galium azuayicum is a species of plant in the family Rubiaceae. It is endemic to Ecuador.
