= Galium uniflorum =

Oneflower bedstraw

Scientific classification
- Kingdom: Plantae
- Clade: Tracheophytes
- Clade: Angiosperms
- Clade: Eudicots
- Clade: Asterids
- Order: Gentianales
- Family: Rubiaceae
- Genus: Galium
- Species: G. uniflorum

Binomial name
- Galium uniflorum Michx.

Species of plant

Galium uniflorum, common name oneflower bedstraw, is a species of plants in the Rubiaceae. It is native to the southeastern United States from eastern Texas to Maryland.
