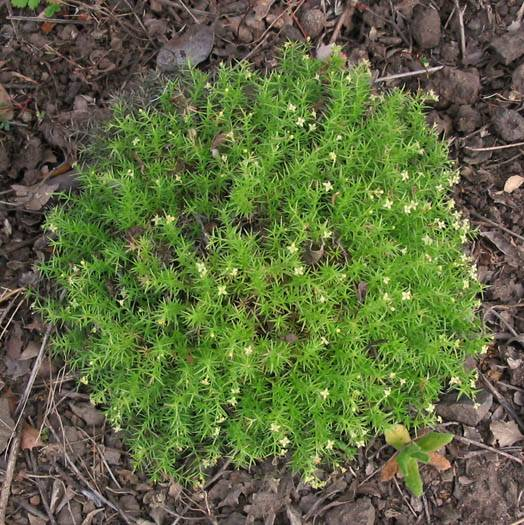

Scientific classification
- Kingdom: Plantae
- Clade: Tracheophytes
- Clade: Angiosperms
- Clade: Eudicots
- Clade: Asterids
- Order: Gentianales
- Family: Rubiaceae
- Genus: Galium
- Species: G. andrewsii

Binomial name
- Galium andrewsii A.Gray

= Galium andrewsii =

Phloxleaf bedstraw

Species of plant

Galium andrewsii is a species of flowering plant in the coffee family known by the common names phloxleaf bedstraw, Andrews' bedstraw, and needlemat galium.

It is native to California and Baja California, where grows in a number of dry habitats such as chaparral and woodland.

== Description ==
Galium andrewsii is a low, clumping or mat-forming perennial herb growing no higher than about 22 centimeters. Narrow, needlelike green to grayish leaves grow in whorls of four on the slender branches. Each is up to a centimeter long and has a sharp point tipped with a hair.

The plant is dioecious with individuals bearing either male or female flowers; the male flowers are produced in clusters and the female flowers are solitary. They are greenish-yellow and similar in appearance otherwise.

The fruit is a berry.

=== Subspecies ===
- Galium andrewsii ssp. andrewsii
- Galium andrewsii ssp. gatense
