= Galium tunetanum =

Tunisian bedstraw

Scientific classification
- Kingdom: Plantae
- Clade: Tracheophytes
- Clade: Angiosperms
- Clade: Eudicots
- Clade: Asterids
- Order: Gentianales
- Family: Rubiaceae
- Genus: Galium
- Species: G. tunetanum

Binomial name
- Galium tunetanum Lam.

Species of plant

Galium tunetanum, or the Tunisian bedstraw, is a species of plant in the Rubiaceae. It is native to Tunisia, Algeria, Morocco, Spain (Province of Málaga), and the island of Sicily.
