= Galium grande =

San Gabriel bedstraw

Conservation status
- Critically Imperiled (NatureServe)

Scientific classification
- Kingdom: Plantae
- Clade: Tracheophytes
- Clade: Angiosperms
- Clade: Eudicots
- Clade: Asterids
- Order: Gentianales
- Family: Rubiaceae
- Genus: Galium
- Species: G. grande

Binomial name
- Galium grande McClatchie

Species of plant

Galium grande is a species of flowering plant in the coffee family known by the common name San Gabriel bedstraw. This uncommon plant is endemic to the San Gabriel Mountains of Los Angeles County, California.

Galium grande is a large, tough perennial herb forming masses of hairy climbing stems from a woody base. Stems reach about half a meter in length and root where their nodes touch the ground. The small, pointed leaves are arranged in whorls of four about the stem. They are dark green and hairy. Flowers are bisexual or unisexual, when unisexual, the male individuals producing small clusters of staminate flowers and female individuals producing solitary pistillate flowers. The flowers are similar in appearance, with small pointed yellowish petals. The fruit is a soft berry.
