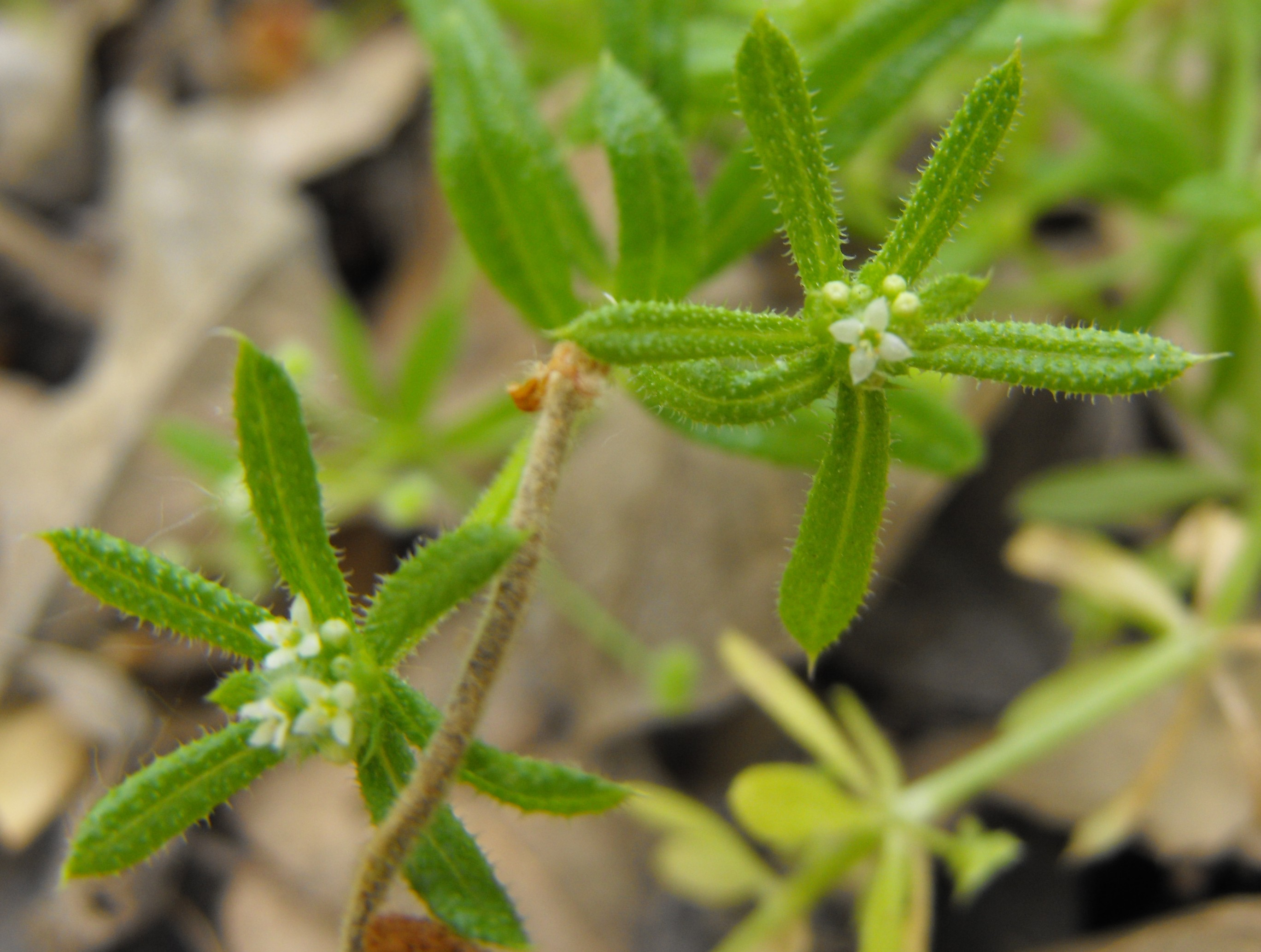

Scientific classification
- Kingdom: Plantae
- Clade: Tracheophytes
- Clade: Angiosperms
- Clade: Eudicots
- Clade: Asterids
- Order: Gentianales
- Family: Rubiaceae
- Genus: Galium
- Species: G. catalinense

Binomial name
- Galium catalinense A.Gray

= Galium catalinense =

Santa Catalina Island bedstraw

Species of plant

Galium catalinense is a species of flowering plant in the coffee family known by the common name Santa Catalina Island bedstraw. It is endemic to two of the Channel Islands of California, where it grows along the coastal bluffs. It is a shrub growing erect to about a meter in maximum height with a rigid stem lined with whorls of four leaves each. The hairy leaves are generally lance-shaped and one to 2.5 centimeters long. The inflorescence emerging from leaf axils is a dense cluster of whitish flowers.

== Subspecies ==
Two subspecies are currently recognized (May 2014):

- Galium catalinense subsp. acrispum Dempster - San Clemente Island
- Galium catalinense subsp. catalinense - Santa Catalina Island
