= Galium mahadivense =

Scientific classification
- Kingdom: Plantae
- Clade: Tracheophytes
- Clade: Angiosperms
- Clade: Eudicots
- Clade: Asterids
- Order: Gentianales
- Family: Rubiaceae
- Genus: Galium
- Species: G. mahadivense

Binomial name
- Galium mahadivense G.Singh

Species of plant

Galium mahadivense, is a species of plant in the family Rubiaceae. It is native to Jammu and Kashmir, in disputed territory administered by India but claimed by Pakistan.

Galium mahadivense was originally described from a site near the city of Srinagar.
