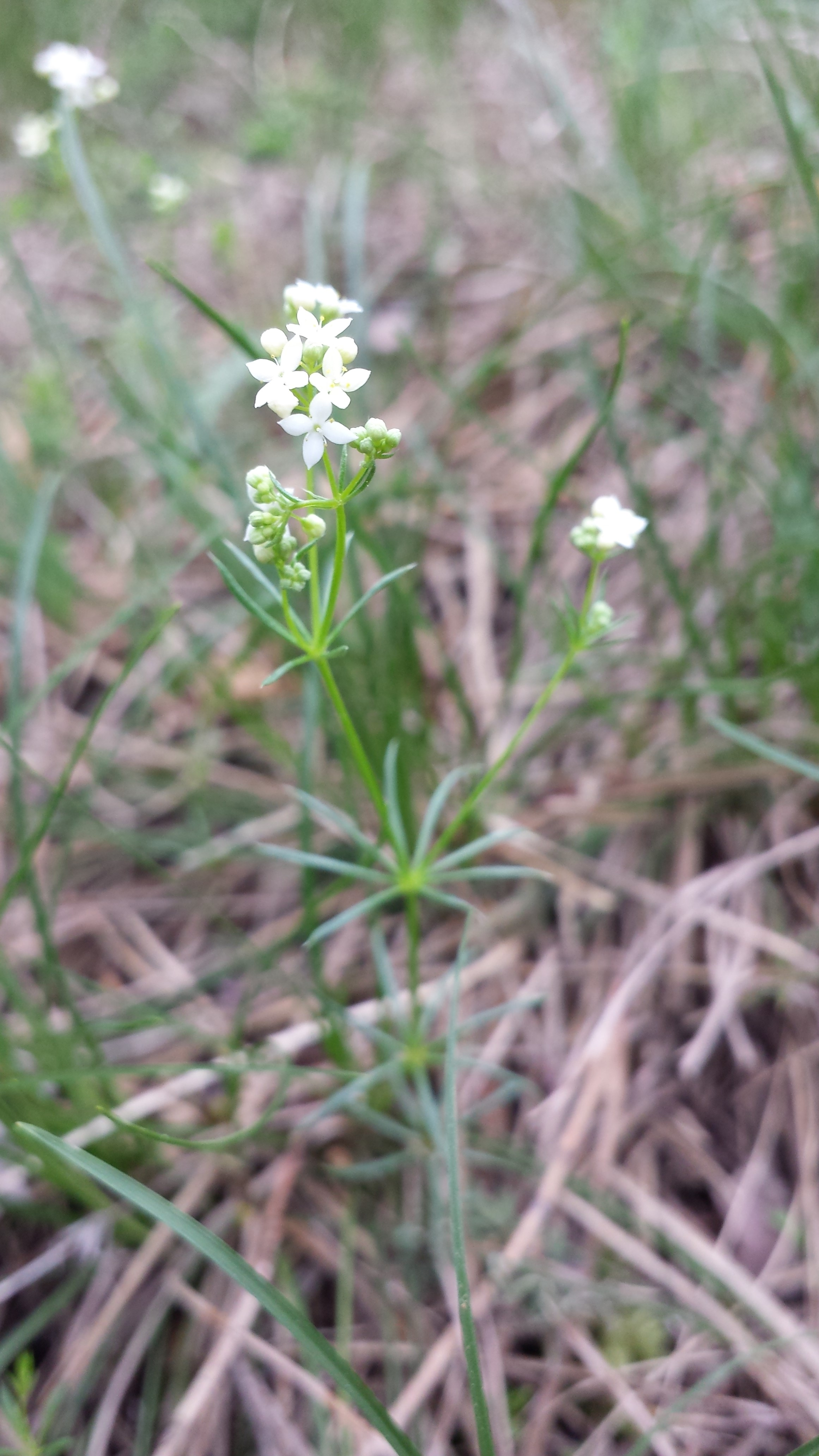

Scientific classification
- Kingdom: Plantae
- Clade: Tracheophytes
- Clade: Angiosperms
- Clade: Eudicots
- Clade: Asterids
- Order: Gentianales
- Family: Rubiaceae
- Genus: Galium
- Species: G. austriacum

Binomial name
- Galium austriacum Jacq.

Synonyms
- Galium sylvestre var. austriacum (Jacq.) Boenn.; Galium sylvestre subsp. vulgatum Gaudin; Galium austriacum var. balatonense Borbás; Galium austriacum subsp. balatonense (Borbás) Ehrend. ex Soó

= Galium austriacum =

Austrian bedstraw

Species of plant

Galium austriacum, the Austrian bedstraw, is a plant species in the Rubiaceae. It was first described in 1773 by Austrian botanist Nicolaus Jacquin as part of his Florae Austriaceae (i.e., Flora of Austria), the Austrian Empire in 1773 having been rather larger than the present-day Republic of Austria. The species is found in mountainous regions of present-day Austria, Switzerland, Italy (Piemonte and Toscana), the Czech Republic, Slovakia, Hungary, and the former Yugoslavia.
