= Galium cometerhizon =

Scientific classification
- Kingdom: Plantae
- Clade: Tracheophytes
- Clade: Angiosperms
- Clade: Eudicots
- Clade: Asterids
- Order: Gentianales
- Family: Rubiaceae
- Genus: Galium
- Species: G. cometerhizon

Binomial name
- Galium cometerhizon Lapeyr.

Synonyms
- Galium suaveolens Lapeyr.; Galium megalospermum subsp. cometerhizon (Lapeyr.) Nyman

Species of plant

Galium cometerhizon is a species of plants in the Rubiaceae. It is native to the Pyrenees of Spain and France, and the Island of Corsica in the Mediterranean.

Galium cometerhizon is a low-growing, mat-forming herb with succulent leaves and white flowers.
