= Galium cliftonsmithii =

Scientific classification
- Kingdom: Plantae
- Clade: Tracheophytes
- Clade: Angiosperms
- Clade: Eudicots
- Clade: Asterids
- Order: Gentianales
- Family: Rubiaceae
- Genus: Galium
- Species: G. cliftonsmithii

Binomial name
- Galium cliftonsmithii (Dempster) Dempster & Stebbins

Species of plant

Galium cliftonsmithii is a species of flowering plant in the coffee family known by the common name Santa Barbara bedstraw. It is endemic to the coastal mountain ranges of California from Monterey to Los Angeles Counties. This is a perennial herb with slender, prickly climbing stems 30 to 60 centimeters long. The stems have whorls of four oval-shaped, pointed leaves tipped with hairs. The plant is dioecious, with individuals bearing either male or female flowers. Both types of flowers are yellowish and borne in small clusters. This plant was named for Clifton F. Smith, head botanist at the Santa Barbara Botanic Garden in 1958.
