= Galium suecicum =

Swedish bedstraw

Scientific classification
- Kingdom: Plantae
- Clade: Tracheophytes
- Clade: Angiosperms
- Clade: Eudicots
- Clade: Asterids
- Order: Gentianales
- Family: Rubiaceae
- Genus: Galium
- Species: G. suecicum

Binomial name
- Galium suecicum (Sterner) Ehrend.

Synonyms
- Galium pumilum subsp. suecicum Sterner in C.A.M.Lindman

Species of plant

Galium suecicum or Swedish bedstraw is a plant species of the Rubiaceae. It is native to central and southern Sweden, and has also been collected in Germany.
