= Galium emeryense =

Scientific classification
- Kingdom: Plantae
- Clade: Tracheophytes
- Clade: Angiosperms
- Clade: Eudicots
- Clade: Asterids
- Order: Gentianales
- Family: Rubiaceae
- Genus: Galium
- Species: G. emeryense

Binomial name
- Galium emeryense Dempster & Ehrend.

Synonyms
- Galium hypotrichium subsp. scabriusculum Ehrend; Galium scabriusculum (Ehrend.) Dempster & Ehrend.; Galium nitidulum var. scabriusculum Heinr.Braun ex Oborný

Species of plant

Galium emeryense (Emery County bedstraw) is a plant species in the Rubiaceae. It is native to the state of Utah in the United States.
