= Galium johnstonii =

Johnston's bedstraw

Scientific classification
- Kingdom: Plantae
- Clade: Embryophytes
- Clade: Tracheophytes
- Clade: Spermatophytes
- Clade: Angiosperms
- Clade: Eudicots
- Clade: Asterids
- Order: Gentianales
- Family: Rubiaceae
- Genus: Galium
- Species: G. johnstonii

Binomial name
- Galium johnstonii Dempster & Stebbins

Species of plant

Galium johnstonii (Johnston's bedstraw) is a plant species in the Rubiaceae. It is endemic to California, United States, known from four counties: San Bernardino, Los Angeles, Riverside and San Diego. It is dioecious, with male and female flowers on separate plants.
