= Galium formosense =

Scientific classification
- Kingdom: Plantae
- Clade: Tracheophytes
- Clade: Angiosperms
- Clade: Eudicots
- Clade: Asterids
- Order: Gentianales
- Family: Rubiaceae
- Genus: Galium
- Species: G. formosense

Binomial name
- Galium formosense Ohwi

Synonyms
- Galium kwanzanense Ohwi

Species of plant

Galium formosense is a species of flowering plant in the bedstraw genus Galium, family Rubiaceae, native to Taiwan. A procumbent or erect perennial herb reaching 30 cm (12 in), it is found in the mountains in fields and alongside trails, roads, and ditches at elevations from 600 to 3,000 m (2,000 to 9,800 ft). It may be conspecific with Galium elegans.
