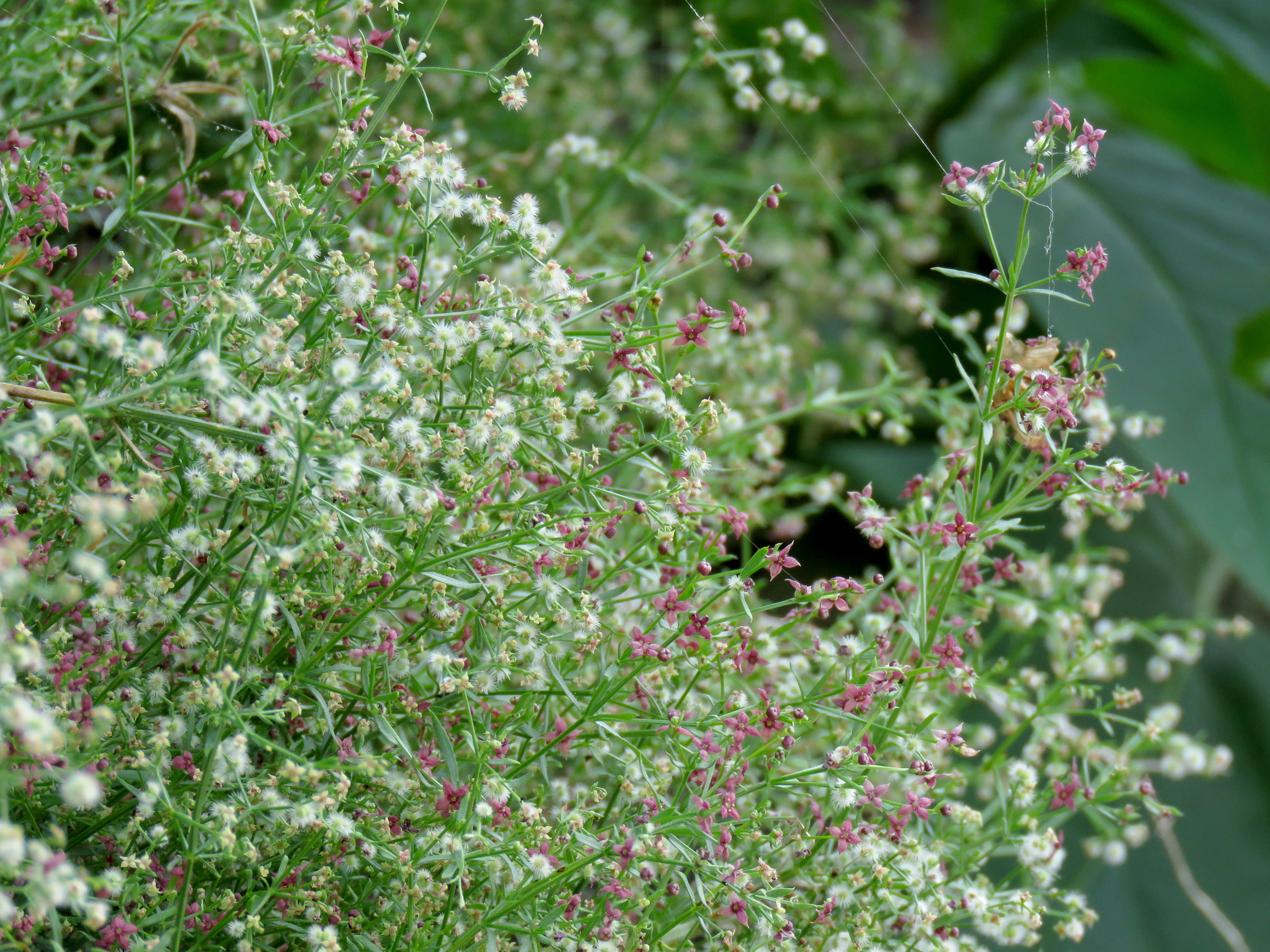

Scientific classification
- Kingdom: Plantae
- Clade: Tracheophytes
- Clade: Angiosperms
- Clade: Eudicots
- Clade: Asterids
- Order: Gentianales
- Family: Rubiaceae
- Genus: Galium
- Species: G. wrightii

Binomial name
- Galium wrightii A.Gray.

= Galium wrightii =

Wright's bedstraw

Species of plant

Galium wrightii, common name Wright's bedstraw, is a species of plants in the Rubiaceae. It is native to northwestern Mexico and southwestern United States: Sonora, Chihuahua, Arizona, New Mexico, western Texas, southwestern Utah (Washington Co.), southern Nevada (Clark + Lincoln Cos.) and southeastern California (San Bernardino County) In California, this plant is ranked as rare, threatened, or endangered in CA; common elsewhere.
