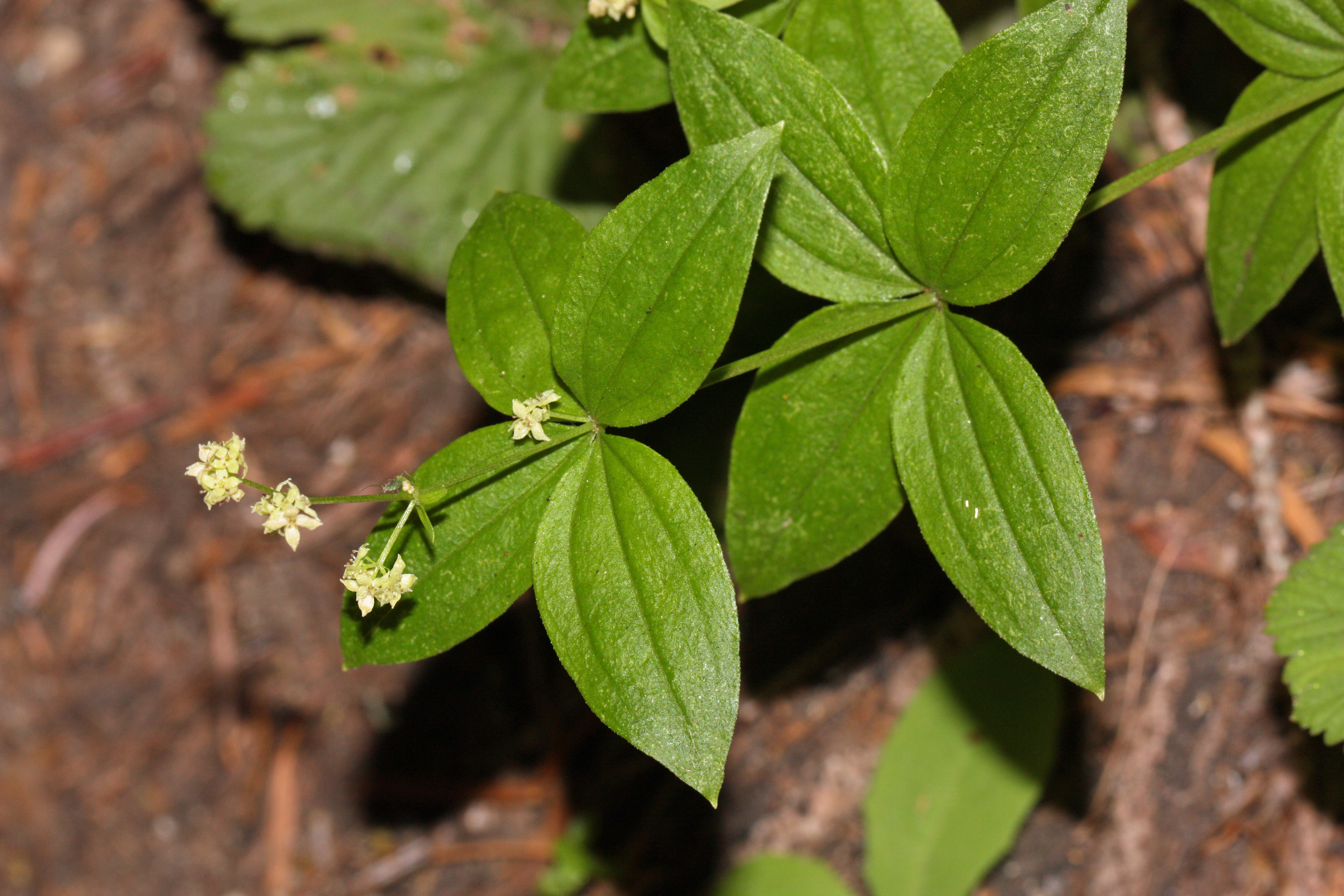

Scientific classification
- Kingdom: Plantae
- Clade: Tracheophytes
- Clade: Angiosperms
- Clade: Eudicots
- Clade: Asterids
- Order: Gentianales
- Family: Rubiaceae
- Genus: Galium
- Species: G. oreganum

Binomial name
- Galium oreganum Britton

Synonyms
- Galium kamtschaticum var. oreganum (Britton) Piper; Galium kamtschaticum subsp. oreganum (Britton) Piper; Galium woonasquatucketensis E.J.Whalen

= Galium oreganum =

Species of plant

Galium oreganum, the Oregon bedstraw, is a plant species in the family Rubiaceae. It is native to British Columbia, Washington, Oregon, and northern California (Siskiyou and Del Norte Counties).
