= Galium bolanderi =

Scientific classification
- Kingdom: Plantae
- Clade: Tracheophytes
- Clade: Angiosperms
- Clade: Eudicots
- Clade: Asterids
- Order: Gentianales
- Family: Rubiaceae
- Genus: Galium
- Species: G. bolanderi

Binomial name
- Galium bolanderi Gray

Species of plant

Galium bolanderi is a species of flowering plant in the coffee family known by the common name Bolander's bedstraw. It is native to the mountains of California and southern Oregon. It is a resident of mountain forests and chaparral slopes.

Galium bolanderi is a stout perennial herb or small shrub growing from a woody base. It produces sprawling or climbing stems up to 25 centimeters long which may be hairless to hairy. Small pointed leaves grow in whorls of four divided into two pairs at intervals along the stem, which may branch at these points. The plant is dioecious, with male plants producing clusters of staminate flowers on pedicels and female plants producing solitary pistillate flowers. Both types of flower are usually maroon. The fruit is a berry.
