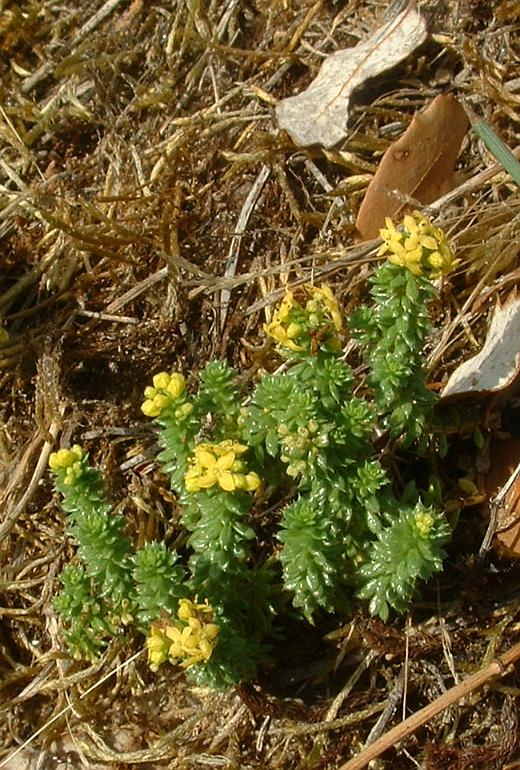

Scientific classification
- Kingdom: Plantae
- Clade: Tracheophytes
- Clade: Angiosperms
- Clade: Eudicots
- Clade: Asterids
- Order: Gentianales
- Family: Rubiaceae
- Genus: Galium
- Species: G. arenarium

Binomial name
- Galium arenarium Loisel.

Synonyms
- Galium hierosolymitanum Thore nom. illeg.

= Galium arenarium =

Sand bedstraw

Species of plant

Galium arenarium or sand bedstraw is a plant species of the genus Galium. It grows on beaches and sand dunes along the Atlantic coast of western France and northern Spain.

== Taxonomy ==
The species was described by Jean-Louis-Auguste Loiseleur-Deslongchamps in 1828.
