= Galium magellense =

Maiella bedstraw

Scientific classification
- Kingdom: Plantae
- Clade: Tracheophytes
- Clade: Angiosperms
- Clade: Eudicots
- Clade: Asterids
- Order: Gentianales
- Family: Rubiaceae
- Genus: Galium
- Species: G. magellense

Binomial name
- Galium magellense Ten.

Species of plant

Galium magellense, Maiella bedstraw, is a plant species of the Rubiaceae. It is named for the Maiella mountains of central Italy, with the range extending from the Maiellas south along the Apennines to Calabria.

Galium magellense is a diminutive perennial herb that rarely grows more than 10 cm tall. Leaves are whorled, generally about 8 per node, oblanceolate to linear. Flowers are white to pale greenish-yellow.
