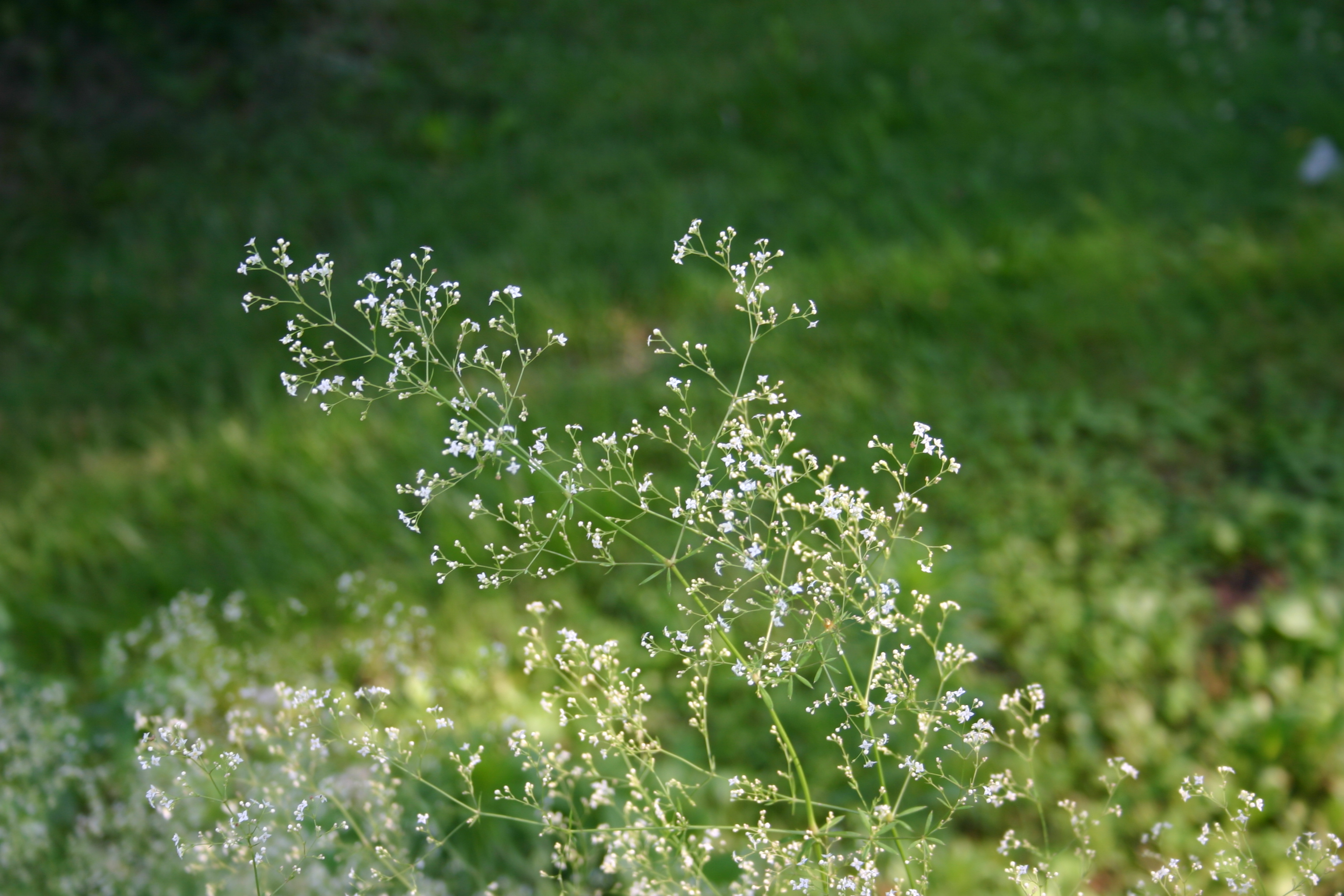

Scientific classification
- Kingdom: Plantae
- Clade: Tracheophytes
- Clade: Angiosperms
- Clade: Eudicots
- Clade: Asterids
- Order: Gentianales
- Family: Rubiaceae
- Genus: Galium
- Species: G. aristatum

Binomial name
- Galium aristatum L.

= Galium aristatum =

Species of plant

Galium aristatum, the awned bedstraw, is a plant species in the Rubiaceae, currently (May 2014) accepted as a distinct species. It is native to the Alps and the Pyrenees Mountains of Europe (Spain, France, Italy, Switzerland, Austria and Germany). It is also reportedly naturalized in a few places in New York State in the United States.
