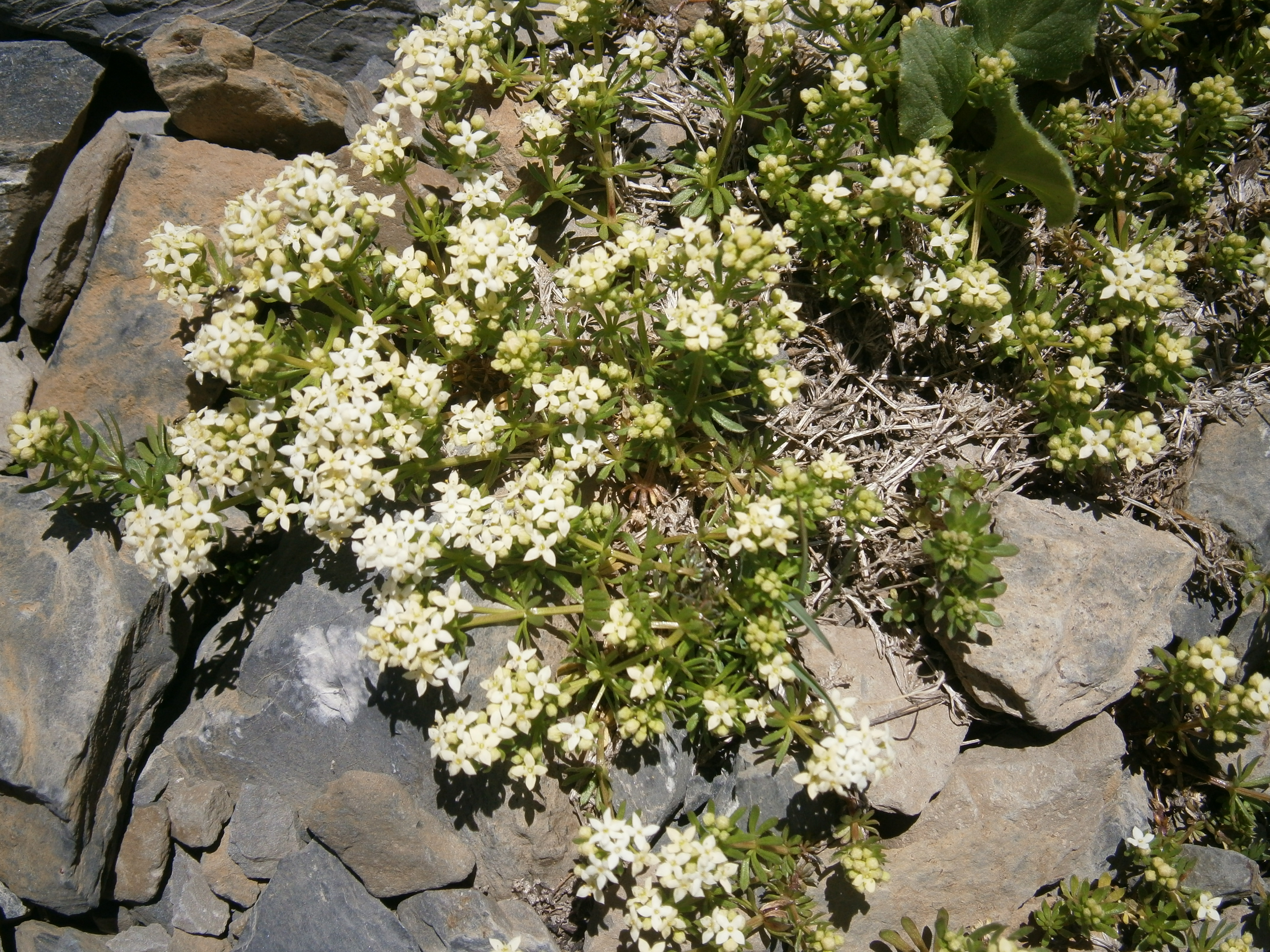

Scientific classification
- Kingdom: Plantae
- Clade: Tracheophytes
- Clade: Angiosperms
- Clade: Eudicots
- Clade: Asterids
- Order: Gentianales
- Family: Rubiaceae
- Genus: Galium
- Species: G. megalospermum

Binomial name
- Galium megalospermum All.

Synonyms
- Galium montanum Vill.; Galium pusillum Vill.; Galium prostratum Haller ex Roem. & Schult.; Galium villarsii Gaudin ex Roem. & Schult.; Galium sylvestre subsp. virens Gaudin; Galium rupicola Bertol.; Galium syriacum Hauke.; Galium helveticum var. elongatum Gren. & Godr.; Galium cenisium Arv.-Touv.; Galium sylvestre var. montanum Nyman; Galium helveticum var. allionii Rouy in G.Rouy & J.Foucaud; Galium helveticum var. cenisium (Arv.-Touv.) Rouy in G.Rouy & J.Foucaud

= Galium megalospermum =

Species of plant

Galium megalospermum, the Swiss bedstraw or big-seeded bedstraw, is a plant species in the Rubiaceae. It is native to the Alps in Central Europe (eastern France, Switzerland, Austria, southern Germany and northern Italy).

Galium megalospermum is a low-lying plant rarely more than 5 cm tall, forming clumps, very often in narrow places between rocks. Leaves are whorled, usually 6 or 7 per node, egg-shaped, thick and fleshy. Flowers are white to cream-colored, with 4 or 5 petals.
