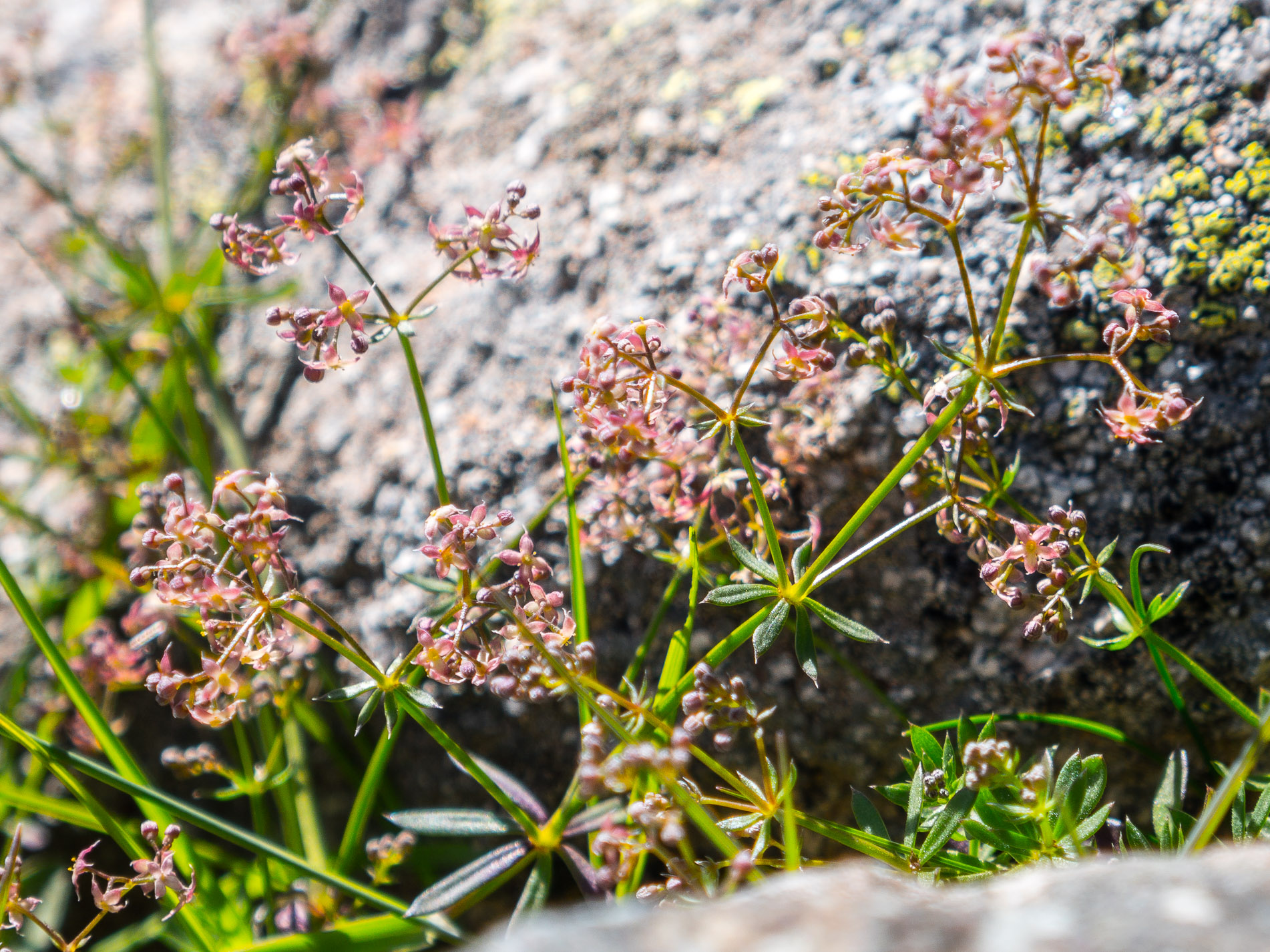

Scientific classification
- Kingdom: Plantae
- Clade: Tracheophytes
- Clade: Angiosperms
- Clade: Eudicots
- Clade: Asterids
- Order: Gentianales
- Family: Rubiaceae
- Genus: Galium
- Species: G. corsicum

Binomial name
- Galium corsicum Spreng.

= Galium corsicum =

Corsican bedstraw

Species of plant

Galium corsicum, the Corsican bedstraw, is a plant species in the Rubiaceae. It is native to the islands of Corsica and Sardinia in the Mediterranean.
