= Galium fendleri =

Scientific classification
- Kingdom: Plantae
- Clade: Tracheophytes
- Clade: Angiosperms
- Clade: Eudicots
- Clade: Asterids
- Order: Gentianales
- Family: Rubiaceae
- Genus: Galium
- Species: G. fendleri

Binomial name
- Galium fendleri A.Gray

Species of plant

Galium fendleri, Fendler's bedstraw, is a plant species in the Rubiaceae. It has yellow flowers and is native to Sonora, Arizona, New Mexico, and Texas.
