= Galium procurrens =

Scientific classification
- Kingdom: Plantae
- Clade: Tracheophytes
- Clade: Angiosperms
- Clade: Eudicots
- Clade: Asterids
- Order: Gentianales
- Family: Rubiaceae
- Genus: Galium
- Species: G. procurrens

Binomial name
- Galium procurrens Ehrend.

Species of flowering plant

Galium procurrens is a perennial herb in the family Rubiaceae.It is found in European deciduous forests in the Balkans and other parts of Europe, such as Italy and Northern Germany.G. procurrens has bluish-green whorls of 5-15 leaves and white flowers.
