= Galium muricatum =

Humboldt bedstraw

Conservation status
- Imperiled (NatureServe)

Scientific classification
- Kingdom: Plantae
- Clade: Tracheophytes
- Clade: Angiosperms
- Clade: Eudicots
- Clade: Asterids
- Order: Gentianales
- Family: Rubiaceae
- Genus: Galium
- Species: G. muricatum

Binomial name
- Galium muricatum W. Wight

Species of plant

Galium muricatum, Humboldt bedstraw, is a species of plant in the Rubiaceae. It is native to northwestern California (Sonoma, Mendocino, Humboldt, Trinity and Siskiyou Counties) and southeastern Oregon (Curry, Josephine, Jackson, and Coos Counties).

Galium muricatum is a perennial herb with white flowers, spreading vegetatively to form sizable colonies. Leaves are in whorls of 4, elliptical, tapering at the tip.
