= Galium hallii =

Hall's bedstraw

Conservation status
- Imperiled (NatureServe)

Scientific classification
- Kingdom: Plantae
- Clade: Tracheophytes
- Clade: Angiosperms
- Clade: Eudicots
- Clade: Asterids
- Order: Gentianales
- Family: Rubiaceae
- Genus: Galium
- Species: G. hallii

Binomial name
- Galium hallii Munz & I.M.Johnst.

Species of plant

Galium hallii (Hall's bedstraw) is a species of plants in the family Rubiaceae. It is known only from southern California: (Inyo, San Bernardino, Kern, Los Angeles, Ventura, Santa Barbara and Tulare Counties). It is dioecious, with male and female flowers on separate plants.
