= Galium ecuadoricum =

Conservation status
- Endangered (IUCN 3.1)

Scientific classification
- Kingdom: Plantae
- Clade: Tracheophytes
- Clade: Angiosperms
- Clade: Eudicots
- Clade: Asterids
- Order: Gentianales
- Family: Rubiaceae
- Genus: Galium
- Species: G. ecuadoricum

Binomial name
- Galium ecuadoricum Dempster

Species of plant

Galium ecuadoricum is a species of plant in the family Rubiaceae. It is endemic to Ecuador.
