= Galium argense =

Conservation status
- Critically Imperiled (NatureServe)

Scientific classification
- Kingdom: Plantae
- Clade: Tracheophytes
- Clade: Angiosperms
- Clade: Eudicots
- Clade: Asterids
- Order: Gentianales
- Family: Rubiaceae
- Genus: Galium
- Species: G. argense

Binomial name
- Galium argense Dempster & Ehrend.

Species of plant

Galium argense (Argus bedstraw) is a plant species in the Rubiaceae. It is endemic to California and native to Inyo and San Bernardino Counties. It is dioecious, with male and female flowers on separate plants.
