= Galium microphyllum =

Scientific classification
- Kingdom: Plantae
- Clade: Tracheophytes
- Clade: Angiosperms
- Clade: Eudicots
- Clade: Asterids
- Order: Gentianales
- Family: Rubiaceae
- Genus: Galium
- Species: G. microphyllum

Binomial name
- Galium microphyllum A.Gray

Species of plant

Galium microphyllum (bracted bedstraw) is a species of plant in the family Rubiaceae. It is widespread across much of Mexico, and found also in Guatemala, Arizona, New Mexico and western Texas.
