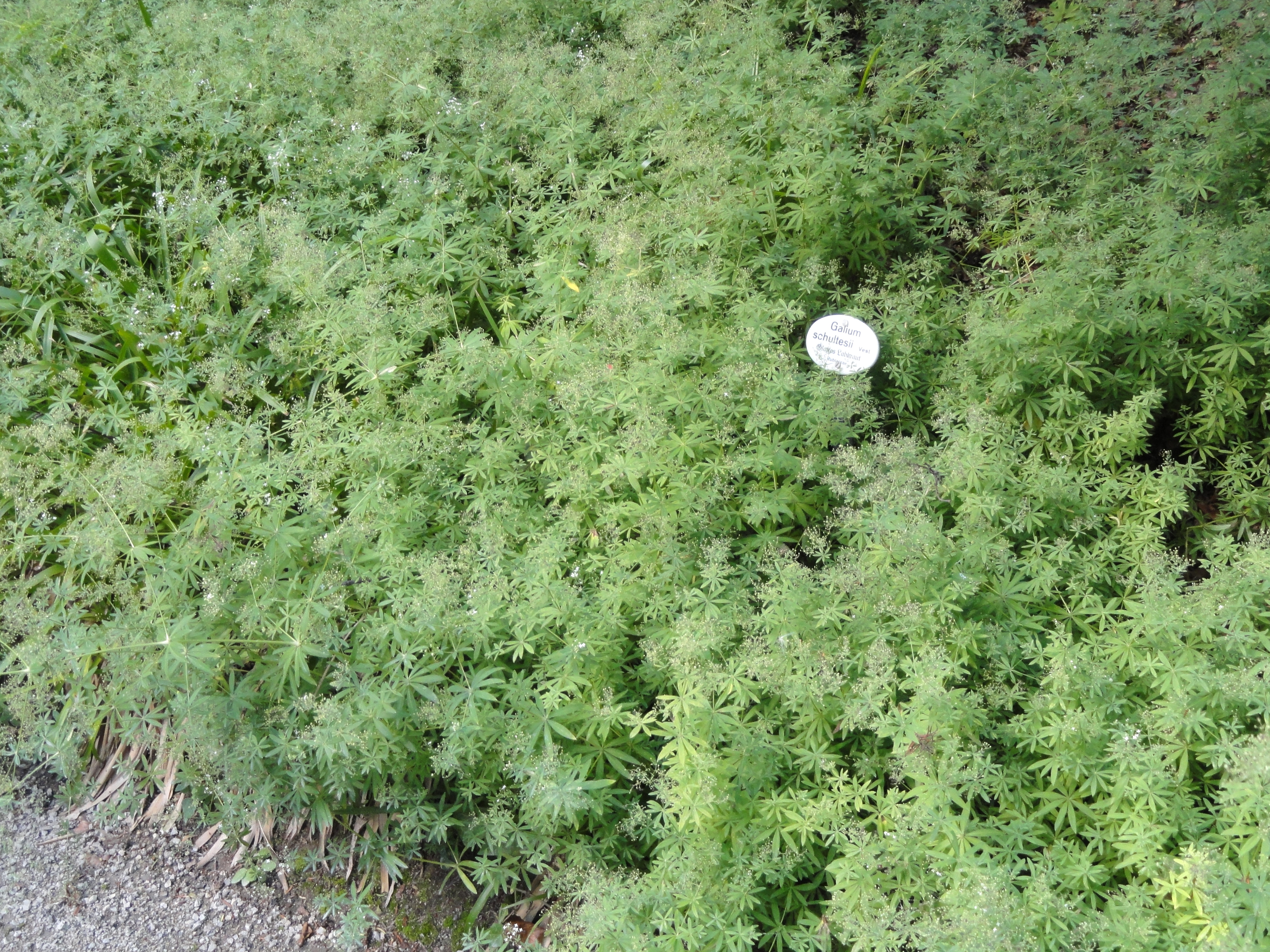

Scientific classification
- Kingdom: Plantae
- Clade: Tracheophytes
- Clade: Angiosperms
- Clade: Eudicots
- Clade: Asterids
- Order: Gentianales
- Family: Rubiaceae
- Genus: Galium
- Species: G. intermedium

Binomial name
- Galium intermedium Schult.

Synonyms
- Galium schultesii Vest; Galium aristatum subsp. schultesii (Vest) Nyman

= Galium intermedium =

Species of plant

Galium intermedium is a species of plant in the family Rubiaceae. It is native to Central and eastern Europe (Austria, the Czech Republic, Germany, Hungary, Poland, France, Albania, Romania, Bulgaria, Turkey, Belarus, the Baltic States, Ukraine, western Russia and the former Yugoslavia). It is also reportedly naturalized in Santa Clara County, California.
