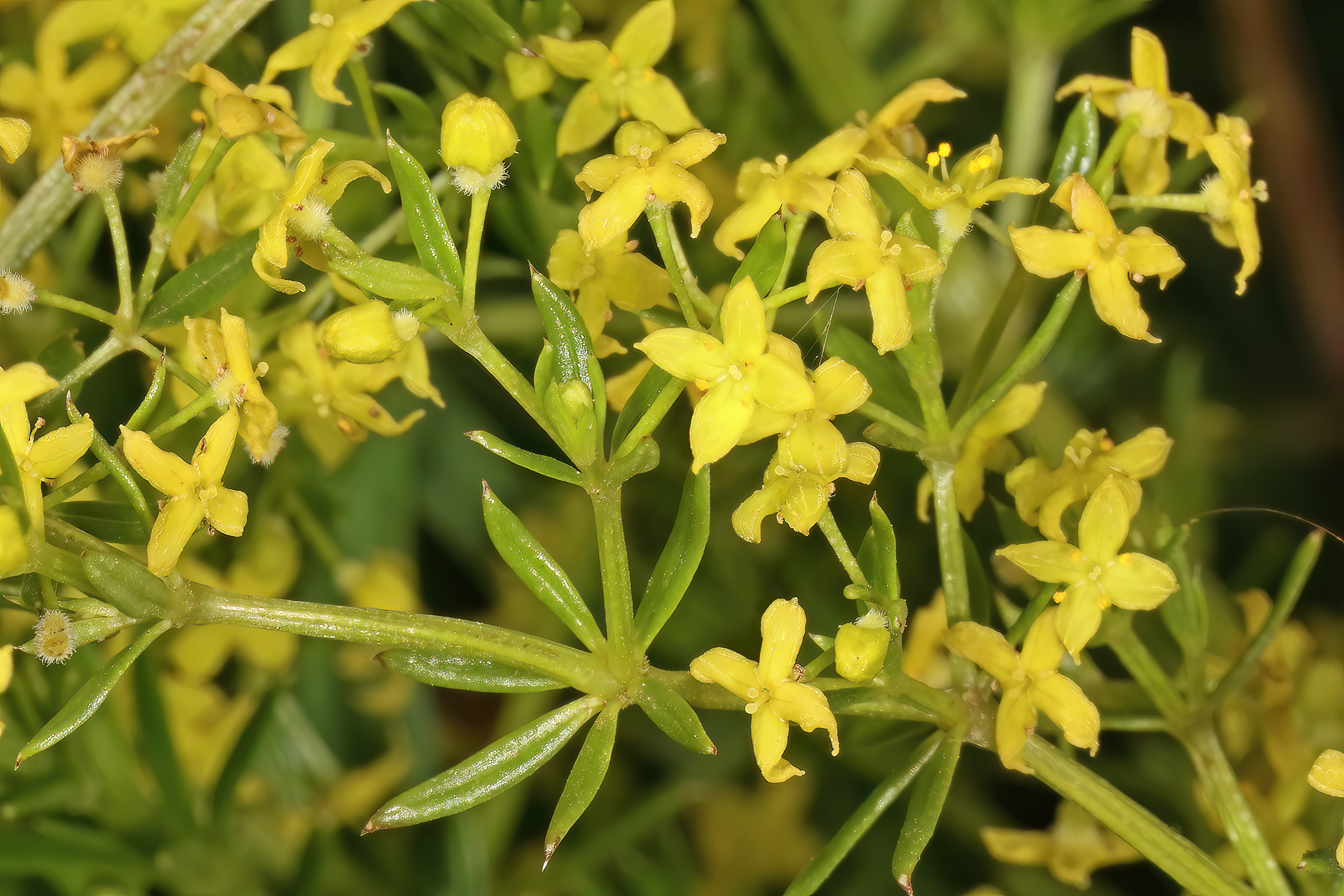
- Galium capense subsp. garipense flowers
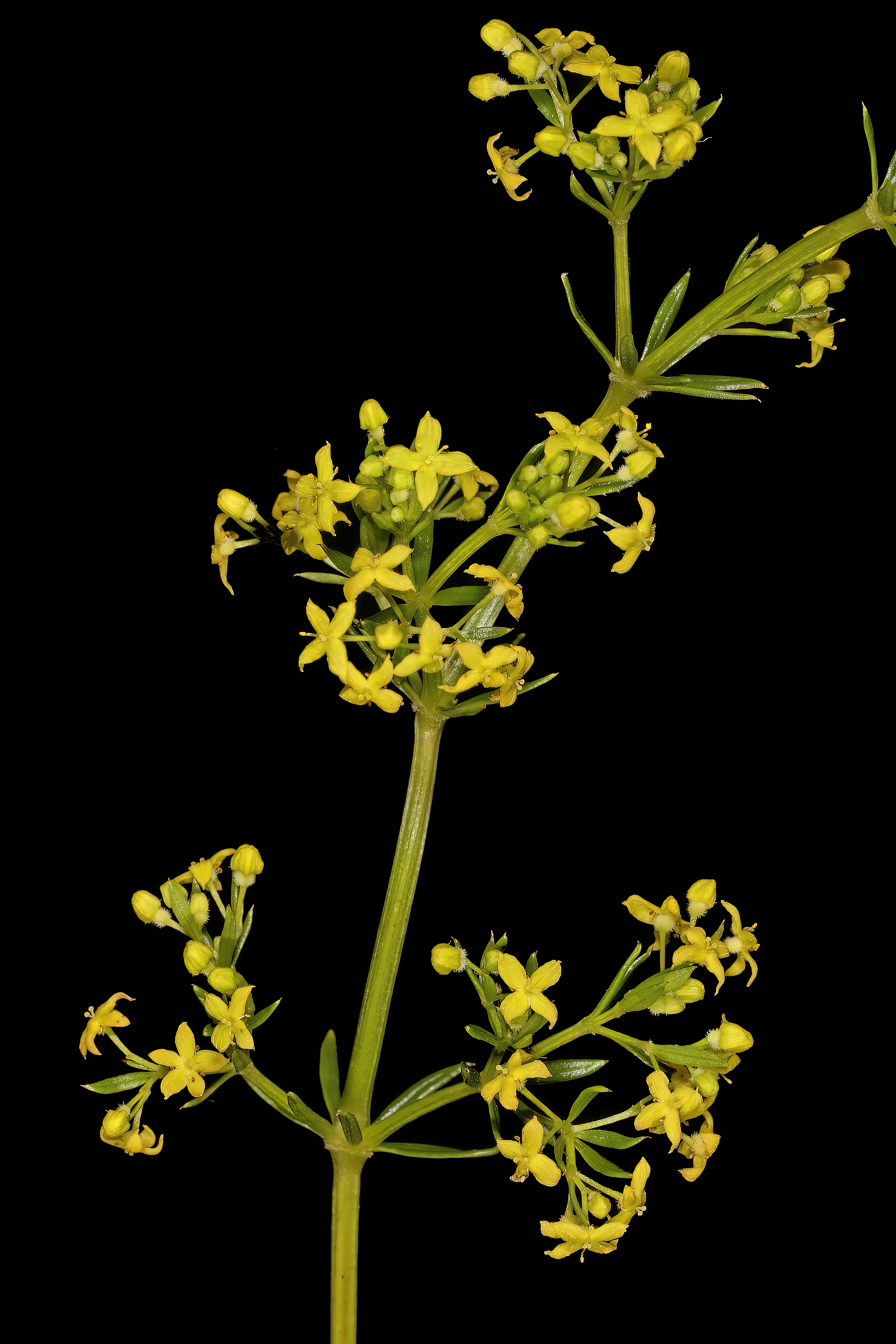
- Galium capense subsp. garipense habit

Scientific classification
- Kingdom: Plantae
- Clade: Tracheophytes
- Clade: Angiosperms
- Clade: Eudicots
- Clade: Asterids
- Order: Gentianales
- Family: Rubiaceae
- Genus: Galium
- Species: G. capense

Binomial name
- Galium capense Thunb.

Synonyms
- List: Galium capense var. scabrum Sond.; Galium capense var. expansum (Thunb.) Sond.; Galium capense var. garipense (Sond.) Puff; Galium capense var. minus Sond.; Galium capense var. wittbergense (Sond.) Puff; Galium expansum Thunb.; Galium garipense Sond.; Galium mucronatum Thunb.; Galium namaquense Eckl. & Zeyh.; Galium wittbergense Sond.

= Galium capense =

Species of plant

Galium capense, the tiny tots, is a species of flowering plant in the family Rubiaceae, native to South Africa and Lesotho. A scrambling perennial reaching 90 cm (35 in), it is found in rocky, damp places across South Africa.

== Subtaxa ==
The following subspecies are accepted:

- Galium capense subsp. capense – Cape Provinces
- Galium capense subsp. garipense (Sond.) Puff – entire range
- Galium capense subsp. namaquense (Eckl. & Zeyh.) Puff – Cape Provinces
