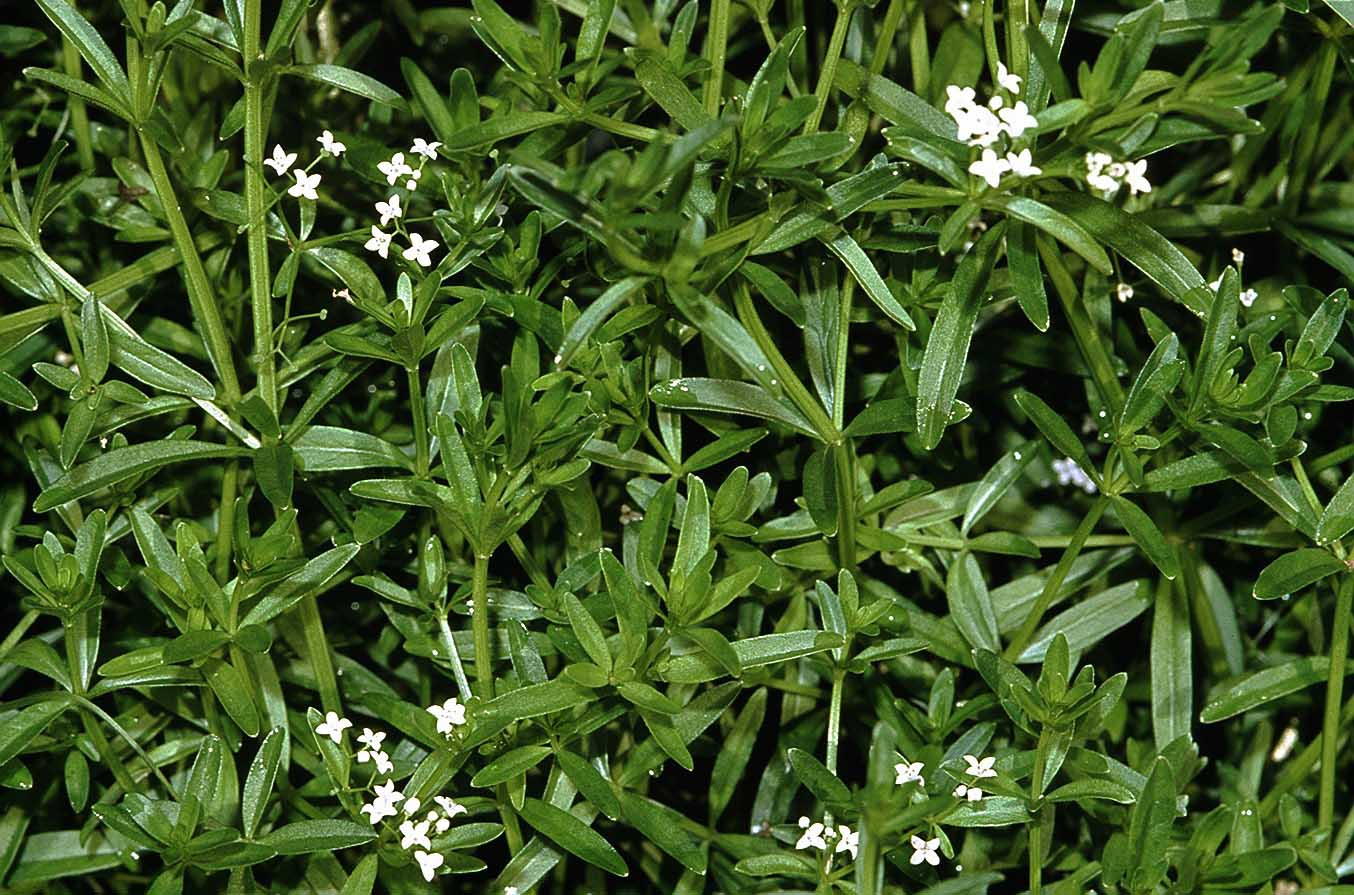
- Galium elongatum in Germany

Scientific classification
- Kingdom: Plantae
- Clade: Embryophytes
- Clade: Tracheophytes
- Clade: Spermatophytes
- Clade: Angiosperms
- Clade: Eudicots
- Clade: Asterids
- Order: Gentianales
- Family: Rubiaceae
- Genus: Galium
- Species: G. elongatum

Binomial name
- Galium elongatum C.Presl in J.S.Presl & C.B.Presl.

Synonyms
- Galium palustre var. elongatum (C.Presl) Rchb.f. in H.G.L.Reichenbach; Galium palustre subsp. elongatum (C.Presl) Lange in G.C.Oeder & al.; Galium palustre f. elongatum (C.Presl) Borza; Galium estoniana N.Fagan; Galium maximum Moris; Galium elongatum f. submersum Glück

= Galium elongatum =

Species of plant

Galium elongatum (marsh bedstraw or tall bedstraw) is a species of plants in the Rubiaceae. It is widespread across most of Europe, North Africa and the Middle East from Turkey to Palestine to Iran.

Galium elongatum is a tall, erect herb with panicles of small white flowers.
