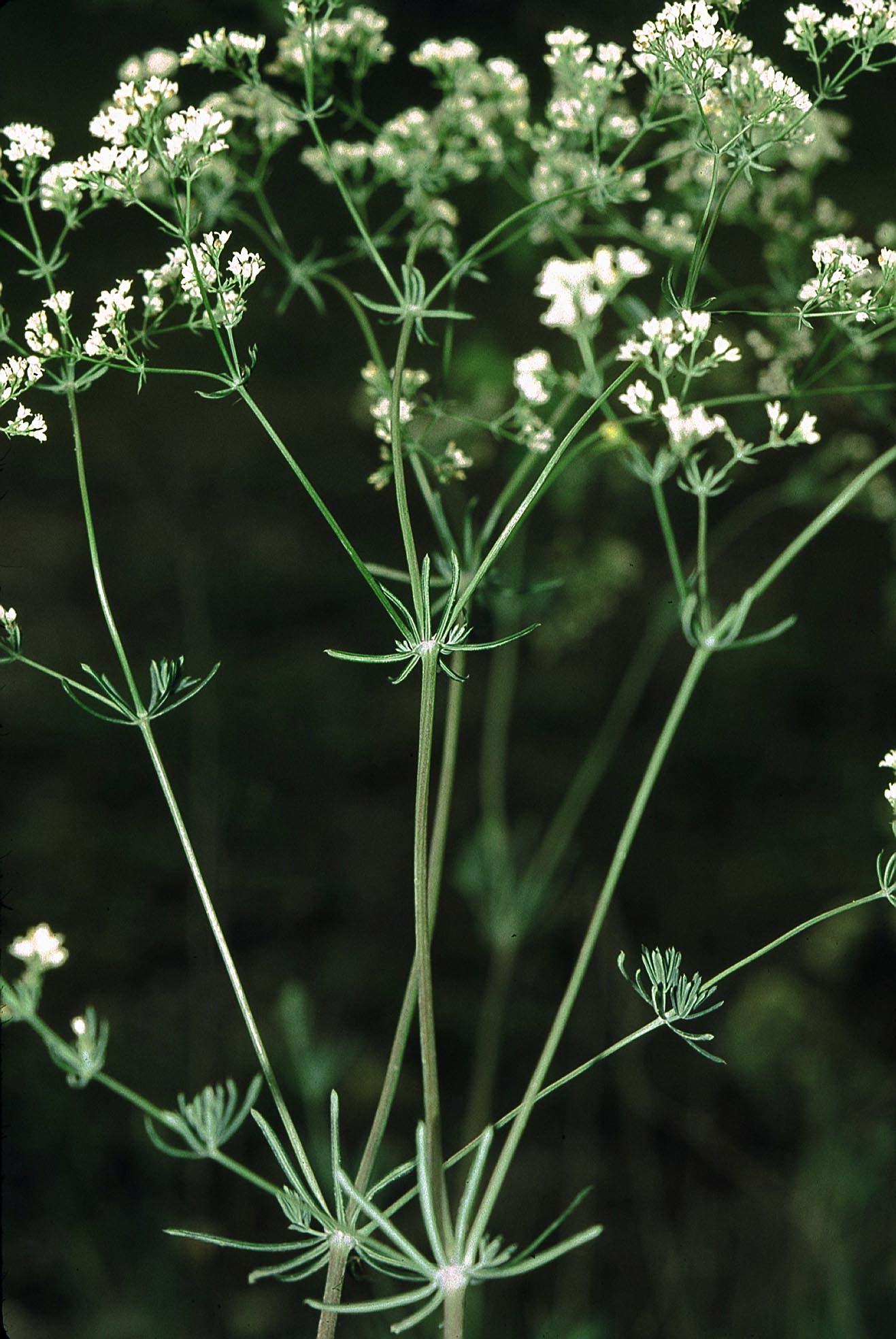

Scientific classification
- Kingdom: Plantae
- Clade: Tracheophytes
- Clade: Angiosperms
- Clade: Eudicots
- Clade: Asterids
- Order: Gentianales
- Family: Rubiaceae
- Genus: Galium
- Species: G. glaucum

Binomial name
- Galium glaucum L.

Synonyms
- Asperula glauca (L.) Besser; Asperula galioides var. glauca (L.) Nyman

= Galium glaucum =

Waxy bedstraw

Species of plant

Galium glaucum or waxy bedstraw is a plant species of the Rubiaceae. It is native to central Europe from Portugal to Ukraine, and sparingly naturalized in a few locations in North America (Quebec, Ontario, Connecticut and New Jersey).

== Subspecies ==
Three subspecies are recognized:

- Galium glaucum subsp. australe Franco - Spain and Portugal
- Galium glaucum subsp. glaucum - France to Ukraine
- Galium glaucum subsp. murcicum (Boiss. & Reut.) O.Bolòs & Vigo - southeastern Spain
