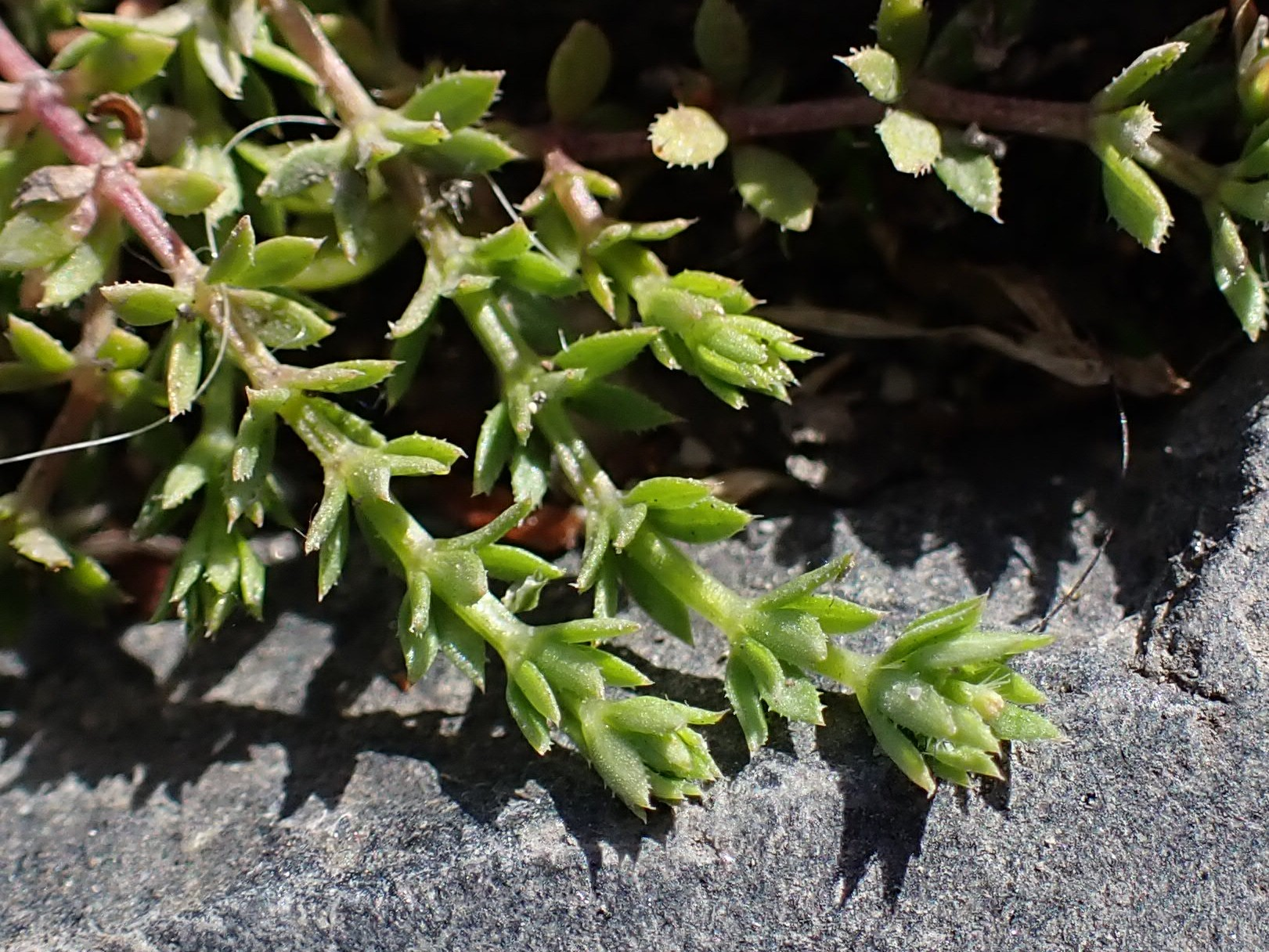

Scientific classification
- Kingdom: Plantae
- Clade: Tracheophytes
- Clade: Angiosperms
- Clade: Eudicots
- Clade: Asterids
- Order: Gentianales
- Family: Rubiaceae
- Genus: Galium
- Species: G. minutulum

Binomial name
- Galium minutulum Jord.

= Galium minutulum =

Minuscule bedstraw

Species of plant

Galium minutulum is a species of plant in the family Rubiaceae. It is native to Spain, Portugal, France and Italy. Some of the Italian collections are located on the island of Sardinia, others inside Arcipelago Toscano National Park, located on a chain of islands off the coast of Tuscany. Many of the French populations are on the Hyères Islands in Provence.

Galium minutulum is a diminutive plant, rarely more than 10 cm tall, and usually trailing along the ground. Flowers are generally less than 1 mm in diameter.
