= Galium oelandicum =

Scientific classification
- Kingdom: Plantae
- Clade: Tracheophytes
- Clade: Angiosperms
- Clade: Eudicots
- Clade: Asterids
- Order: Gentianales
- Family: Rubiaceae
- Genus: Galium
- Species: G. oelandicum

Binomial name
- Galium oelandicum Ehrend.

Synonyms
- Galium pumilum subsp. oelandicum Sterner ex Hyl., not validly published because no description

Species of plant

Galium oelandicum (Öland bedstraw or Ölandsmåra) is a species of plants in the Rubiaceae. It is endemic to the island of Öland in Sweden, in the Baltic Sea. The plant has showy displays of pretty white flowers.
