= Galium laevigatum =

Scientific classification
- Kingdom: Plantae
- Clade: Tracheophytes
- Clade: Angiosperms
- Clade: Eudicots
- Clade: Asterids
- Order: Gentianales
- Family: Rubiaceae
- Genus: Galium
- Species: G. laevigatum

Binomial name
- Galium laevigatum L.

Synonyms
- Galium laevigatum var. genuinum Gren. & Godr.; Galium sylvaticum subsp. laevigatum (L.) Arcang.; Galium atrovirens Lapeyr.; Galium caespitosa K.Walsh; Galium sylvaticum var. atrovirens (Lapeyr.) Gren. & Godr.; Galium sylvaticum var. pyrenaicum Gren. & Godr.

Species of plant

Galium laevigatum is a species of plants in the Rubiaceae. It is native to the mountains of southern and Central Europe: the Alps, the Pyrenees and the Apennines. It has been recorded from Italy, Switzerland, France, Spain, Portugal, Austria, Slovenia and Croatia.

Galium laevigatum is a fairly large plant for the genus, erect and up to 110 cm tall, often reproducing by means of stolons running along the surface of the ground. Leaves are in whorls of 6–8, each lanceolate and up to 8 cm long. Flowers are white, borne in a large terminal panicle.
