= Galium coloradoense =

Colorado bedstraw

Scientific classification
- Kingdom: Plantae
- Clade: Tracheophytes
- Clade: Angiosperms
- Clade: Eudicots
- Clade: Asterids
- Order: Gentianales
- Family: Rubiaceae
- Genus: Galium
- Species: G. coloradoense

Binomial name
- Galium coloradoense W.Wight

Synonyms
- Galium multiflorum var. coloradoense (W.Wight) Cronquist

Species of plant

Galium coloradoense, the Colorado bedstraw, is a plant species in the Rubiaceae. It is native to the southwestern United States: Arizona, New Mexico, Utah, Colorado, and southern Wyoming. It is dioecious, with male and female flowers on separate plants.
