= Galium munzii =

Munz's bedstraw

Scientific classification
- Kingdom: Plantae
- Clade: Tracheophytes
- Clade: Angiosperms
- Clade: Eudicots
- Clade: Asterids
- Order: Gentianales
- Family: Rubiaceae
- Genus: Galium
- Species: G. munzii

Binomial name
- Galium munzii Hilend & J.T.Howell

Species of plant

Galium munzii (Munz's bedstraw) is a species of plant in the family Rubiaceae. It is native to California (Inyo, San Bernardino and Riverside Counties), Arizona (Mohave and Coconino Cos.), Nevada (Clark and Lincoln Cos.), and Utah (Washington and Tooele Cos.).

Galium munzii is a profusely branching, dioecious herb. Leaves are in whorls of 4, broadly egg-shaped or almost round. Flowers are pale green.

== Subspecies ==
Two subspecies are recognized:

- Galium munzii subsp. ambivalens Dempster & Ehrend. – Coconino County
- Galium munzii subsp. munzii – rest of species range
