= Galium clementis =

Conservation status
- Imperiled (NatureServe)

Scientific classification
- Kingdom: Plantae
- Clade: Tracheophytes
- Clade: Angiosperms
- Clade: Eudicots
- Clade: Asterids
- Order: Gentianales
- Family: Rubiaceae
- Genus: Galium
- Species: G. clementis

Binomial name
- Galium clementis Eastw.

Species of plant

Galium clementis is an uncommon species of flowering plant in the coffee family known by the common name Santa Lucia bedstraw. It is endemic to the Santa Lucia Mountains of central California. This is a mat-forming perennial herb forming carpetlike dull green patches amongst the rock litter. The thick leaves are arranged in whorls of four, or occasionally six, about the stem. The foliage is covered thickly in gray hairs. The plant is dioecious, with male plants producing small clusters of staminate flowers and female plants producing solitary pistillate flowers; both types of flower are generally yellow. The fruit is a berry covered in soft hairs.
