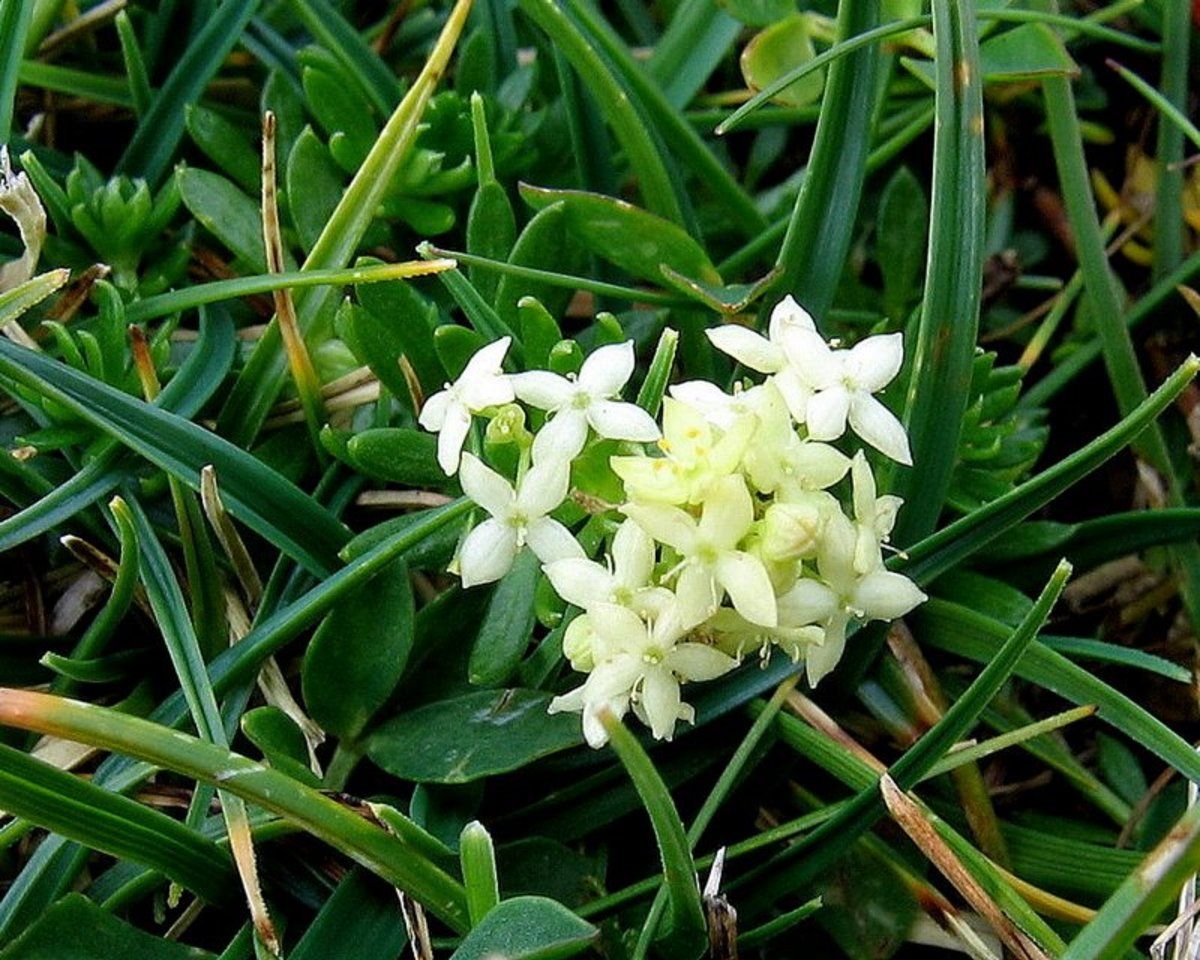

Scientific classification
- Kingdom: Plantae
- Clade: Tracheophytes
- Clade: Angiosperms
- Clade: Eudicots
- Clade: Asterids
- Order: Gentianales
- Family: Rubiaceae
- Genus: Galium
- Species: G. noricum

Binomial name
- Galium noricum Ehrend.

= Galium noricum =

Species of plant

Galium noricum is a species of flowering plant in the family Rubiaceae. It is native to the eastern Alps of Austria, Slovenia, Bavaria and northern Italy (Veneto, Friuli-Venezia Giulia). The species is named for the ancient Roman Province of Noricum, which included most of present-day Austria and much of Slovenia.

Galium noricum is a small plant with shiny green leaves and cream-colored flowers.
