= Galium parishii =

Parish's bedstraw

Scientific classification
- Kingdom: Plantae
- Clade: Tracheophytes
- Clade: Angiosperms
- Clade: Eudicots
- Clade: Asterids
- Order: Gentianales
- Family: Rubiaceae
- Genus: Galium
- Species: G. parishii

Binomial name
- Galium parishii Hilend & J.T.Howell

Synonyms
- Galium multiflorum var. parvifolium Parish; Galium parvifolium (Parish) Jeps. 1925, illegitimate homonym of G. parviflorum Gaudich 1818.

Species of plant

Galium parishii (Parish's bedstraw) is a species of plants in the family Rubiaceae. It is native to southern California (Inyo, San Bernardino, Riverside, Los Angeles and San Diego Counties) and southern Nevada (Clark, Nye and Lincoln Counties).
