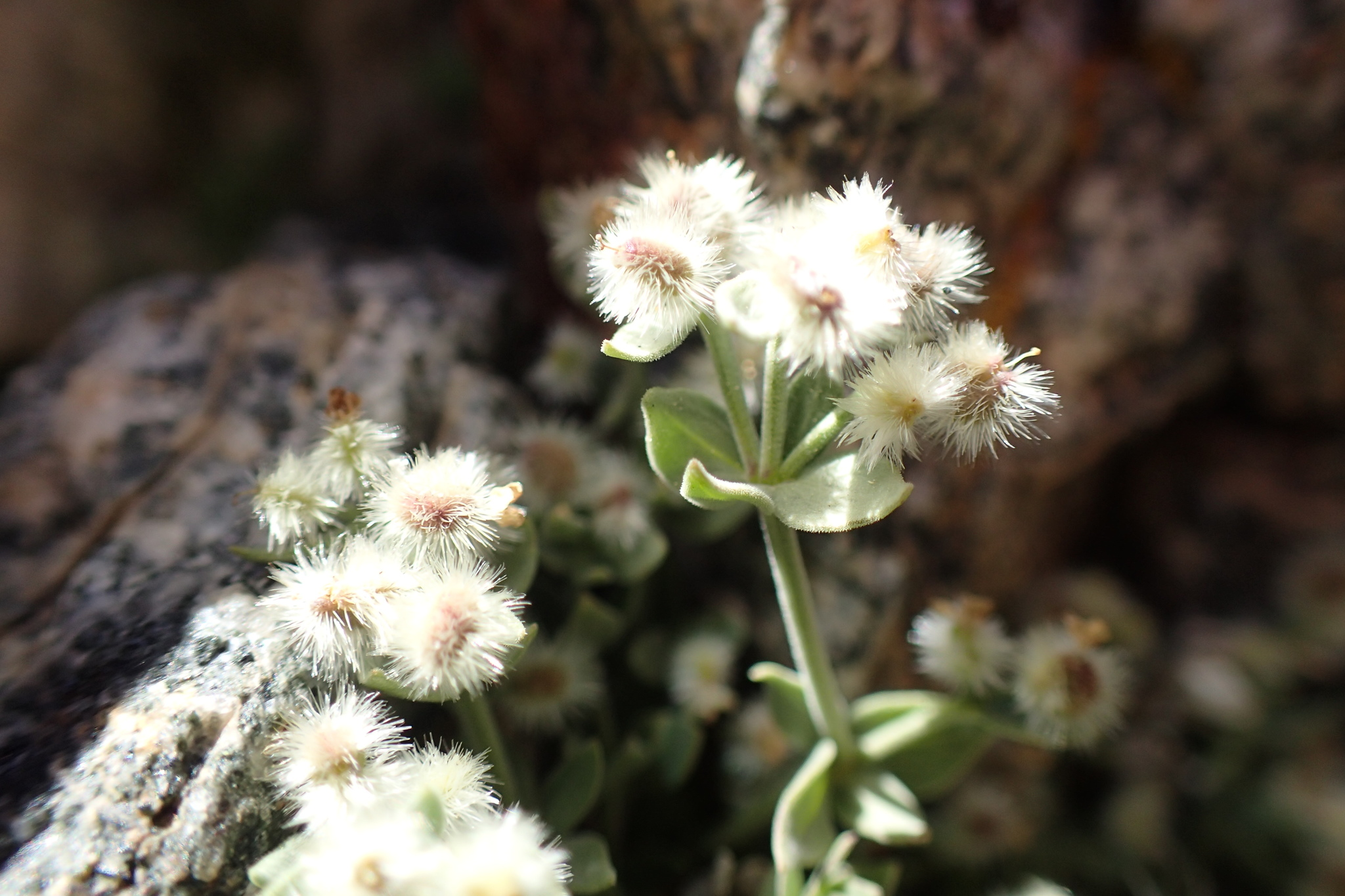
- Subsp. hypotrichium east of Mt. Thompson, Inyo National Forest

Conservation status
- Secure (NatureServe)

Scientific classification
- Kingdom: Plantae
- Clade: Embryophytes
- Clade: Tracheophytes
- Clade: Spermatophytes
- Clade: Angiosperms
- Clade: Eudicots
- Clade: Asterids
- Order: Gentianales
- Family: Rubiaceae
- Genus: Galium
- Species: G. hypotrichium

Binomial name
- Galium hypotrichium A.Gray

= Galium hypotrichium =

Alpine bedstraw

Plant species in the coffee family

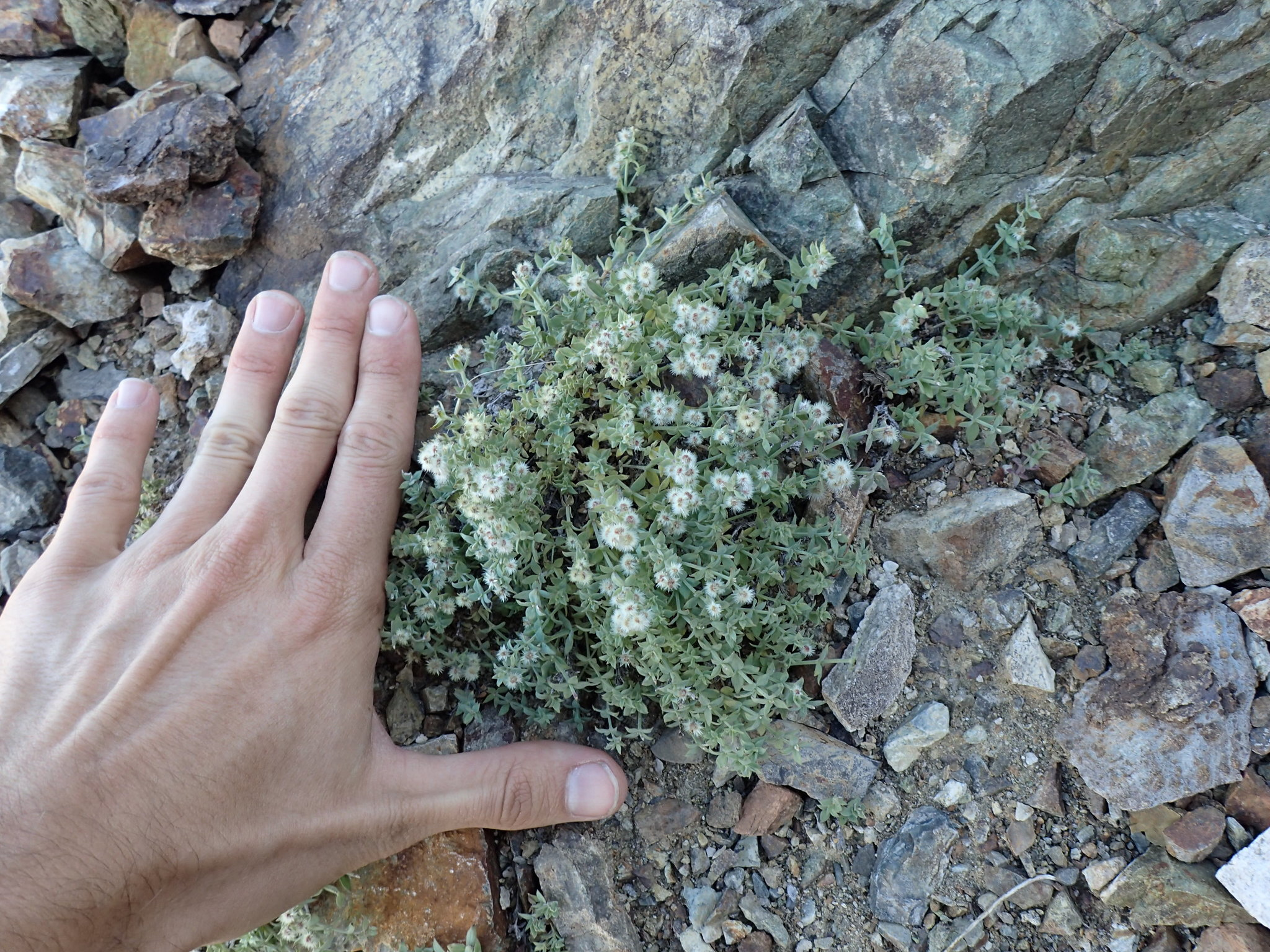

Galium hypotrichium is a species of flowering plant in the coffee family known by the common name alpine bedstraw. It is native to the western United States, where it grows in mountain and plateau habitats, including parts of the Great Basin and Sierra Nevada in California, Nevada, and Utah.

Galium hypotrichium is a perennial herb forming mats from woody bases, sometimes taking dwarf form with stems just a few centimeters long. The stems have many whorls of four fleshy rounded or oval leaves. The inflorescences are made up of small protruding clusters of flowers scattered along the stems. The flowers may be white or tinged with yellow, green, pink, or red. It is dioecious, with male and female flowers on separate plants.

== Taxonomy ==
In 1865 a new species in the genus Galium was scientifically described by Asa Gray which he named Galium hypotrichium. Together with its genus it is classified in the Rubiaceae family and according to Plants of the World Online it has six subspecies.

- Galium hypotrichium subsp. ebbettsense Dempster & Ehrend - Alpine County CA
- Galium hypotrichium subsp. hypotrichium - California and Nevada
- Galium hypotrichium subsp. inyoense Dempster & Ehrend - Inyo County CA
- Galium hypotrichium subsp. nevadense Dempster & Ehrend - Nevada and Utah
- Galium hypotrichium subsp. subalpinum (Hilend & J.T.Howell) Ehrend. - southern California
- Galium hypotrichium subsp. tomentellum Ehrend. - Panamint Ridge in Inyo County CA
