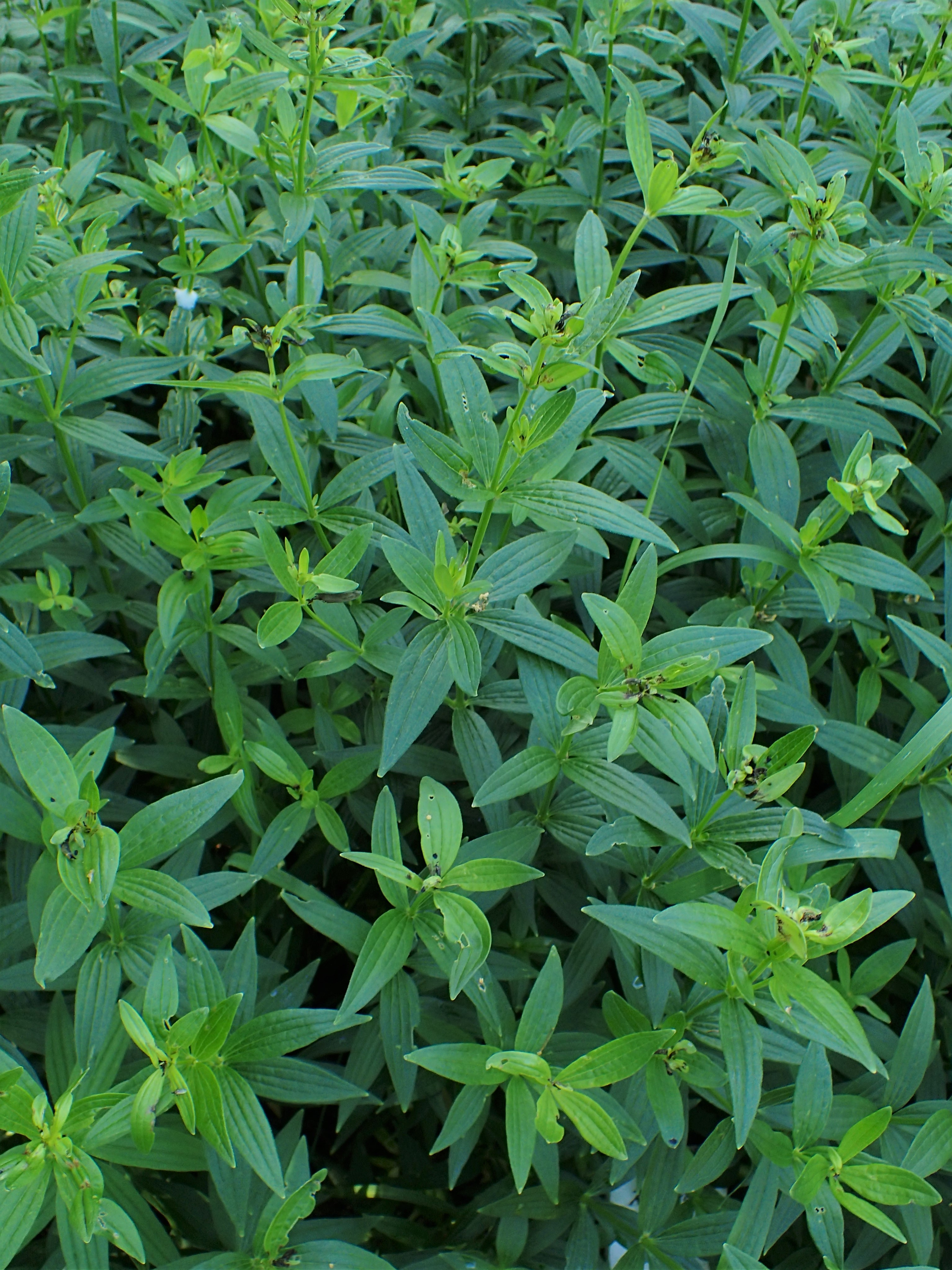

Scientific classification
- Kingdom: Plantae
- Clade: Tracheophytes
- Clade: Angiosperms
- Clade: Eudicots
- Clade: Asterids
- Order: Gentianales
- Family: Rubiaceae
- Genus: Galium
- Species: G. rubioides

Binomial name
- Galium rubioides L.

Synonyms
- Galium nervosum var. rubioides (L.) Lam.; Galium boreale var. rubioides (L.) Čelak.; and many others

= Galium rubioides =

Species of plant

Galium rubioides, the European bedstraw, is a species of plants in the family Rubiaceae, native to Europe and Asia. Natural distribution is from Austria and Croatia east to Russia and Turkey, plus the Caucasus, Western Siberia, Kazakhstan, northern China (Hebei, Heilongjiang, Henan, Jilin, Liaoning, Xinjiang) and the Amur region of Russia. The species is also reportedly naturalized in Northampton County, Pennsylvania.

Galium rubioides is an erect herb up to 100 cm tall, with broad leaves up to 20 cm long and 15 cm wide, generally in whorls of 4. Fruits and roots have a reddish tinge.
