= Galium uncinulatum =

Bristly bedstraw

Scientific classification
- Kingdom: Plantae
- Clade: Tracheophytes
- Clade: Angiosperms
- Clade: Eudicots
- Clade: Asterids
- Order: Gentianales
- Family: Rubiaceae
- Genus: Galium
- Species: G. uncinulatum

Binomial name
- Galium uncinulatum DC.

Synonyms
- Galium obstipum Schltdl.; Galium obstipum f. angustifolium Schltdl.; Galium obstipum f. latifolium Schltdl.; Galium uncinulatum var. obstipum (Schltdl.) S.Watson; Galium rotundifolium var. angustifolium (Schltdl.) Kuntze; Galium rotundifolium var. lyratifolium (R. Rodrig.) X.Alvar.; Galium nelsonii Greenm.

Species of plant

Galium uncinulatum, common name bristly bedstraw, is a species of plants in the Rubiaceae. It is native to Mexico, Guatemala, Costa Rica, Panama, Texas, and Arizona.
