= Galium paschale =

Scientific classification
- Kingdom: Plantae
- Clade: Embryophytes
- Clade: Tracheophytes
- Clade: Angiosperms
- Clade: Eudicots
- Clade: Asterids
- Order: Gentianales
- Family: Rubiaceae
- Genus: Galium
- Species: G. paschale

Binomial name
- Galium paschale Forssk.

Synonyms
- Asperula longifolia Sm.; Galium bulgaricum Velen.; Galium effusum Boiss.; Galium longifolium (Sm.) Griseb.

Species of plant

Galium paschale is a species of flowering plant in the genus Galium found in south-eastern Europe and Turkey.

== Distribution and ecology ==
Galium paschale grows wild in parts of Bulgaria, Greece, the former Yugoslavia, and Turkey. In Turkey, it ranges from the Turkish Thrace in the west to Bitlis Province in the east, and lives in mixed deciduous woodland.

== Taxonomy ==
Galium paschale was first described by the Swedish botanist, Peter Forsskål, in his 1775 work Flora Ægyptiaco-Arabica.
