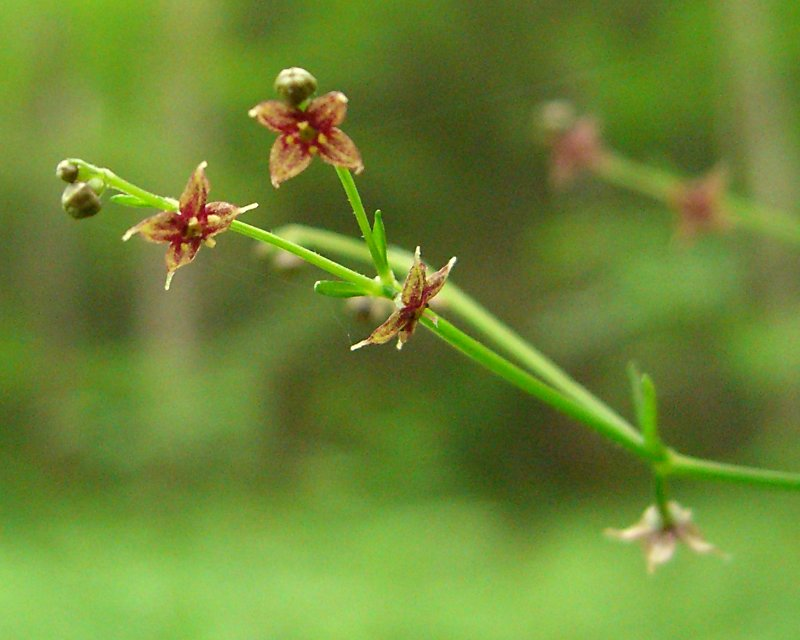
- Purple bedstraw - Galium latifolium

Scientific classification
- Kingdom: Plantae
- Clade: Tracheophytes
- Clade: Angiosperms
- Clade: Eudicots
- Clade: Asterids
- Order: Gentianales
- Family: Rubiaceae
- Genus: Galium
- Species: G. latifolium

Binomial name
- Galium latifolium Michx. 1803 not Buch.-Ham. ex D.Don 1825

= Galium latifolium =

Species of plant

Galium latifolium, the purple bedstraw, is a North American species of plants in the family Rubiaceae. It is native to eastern North America, primarily the Appalachian Mountains from Pennsylvania to Alabama. There are also a few lowland populations in eastern Maryland and eastern South Carolina.
