= Galium magnifolium =

Largeleaf bedstraw

Scientific classification
- Kingdom: Plantae
- Clade: Tracheophytes
- Clade: Angiosperms
- Clade: Eudicots
- Clade: Asterids
- Order: Gentianales
- Family: Rubiaceae
- Genus: Galium
- Species: G. magnifolium

Binomial name
- Galium magnifolium (Dempster) Dempster

Synonyms
- Galium matthewsii var. magnifolium Dempster; Galium munzii fo. glabrum Ehrend.

Species of plant

Galium magnifolium (largeleaf bedstraw) is a species of plants in the Rubiaceae. It is native to California (Inyo Co), Arizona (Coconino Co), Nevada (Clark + Lincoln Cos), and Utah (Washington + San Juan Cos).
