= William Franklin Wight =

American botanist (1874-1954)

William Franklin Wight (born 18 June 1874 in Allegan, Michigan - died 2 February 1954) was an American botanist. Wight studied at Michigan State College and Stanford University.
