= Galium rubrum =

Scientific classification
- Kingdom: Plantae
- Clade: Tracheophytes
- Clade: Angiosperms
- Clade: Eudicots
- Clade: Asterids
- Order: Gentianales
- Family: Rubiaceae
- Genus: Galium
- Species: G. rubrum

Binomial name
- Galium rubrum L.

Synonyms
- Galium purpureum DC. in J.B.A.M.de Lamarck & A.P.de Candolle; Galium morisii Spreng.; Galium rubrum var. parviflorum Gaudin; Galium hirtum Hegetschw.; Galium rubrum var. hirtum Nyman; Galium lichtensteinianum Kyburg; Galium leyboldii A.Kern; Galium rubrum var. grenieri Briq.; Galium rubrum var. leyboldii (A.Kern.) Rouy in G.Rouy & J.Foucaud; Galium rubrum var. transiens Rouy in G.Rouy & J.Foucaud

Species of plant

Galium rubrum (reddish bedstraw or Caglio arrossato) is a plant species in the Rubiaceae. It is known only from mountainous areas on Switzerland and northern Italy (Valle d'Aosta, Piemonte, Lombardia, Trentino-Alto Adige, Veneto, Friuli-Venezia Giulia, Liguria, Emilia-Romagna).

Galium rubrum is an erect to ascending herb with large panicles bearing many small pink or red flowers.
