= G. cruciata =

G. cruciata may refer to:

- Gentiana cruciata, the star gentian or cross gentian, a flowering plant species
- Galium cruciata, a synonym for Cruciata laevipes, a plant species

== See also ==
- Cruciata (disambiguation)
