= Paralophia =

Paralophia is a scientific name for several genera of organisms and may refer to:

- Paralophia (beetle) Aurivillius, 1924, a genus of beetles in the family Cerambycidae
- Paralophia (moth) Warren, 1893, a genus of moths in the family Geometridae
- Paralophia (plant), a plant genus in the family Orchidaceae
