= Callilepis =

Callilepis may refer to:

- Callilepis (spider), a genus of spiders of North America and Eurasia
- Callilepis (plant), a genus of plants of Southern Africa

== See also ==
- Callipelis, a genus of spiders of Iran
- Callipeltis, a genus of plants of the Mediterranean and West Asia
