= Galium aschenbornii =

Conservation status
- Data Deficient (IUCN 3.1)

Scientific classification
- Kingdom: Plantae
- Clade: Tracheophytes
- Clade: Angiosperms
- Clade: Eudicots
- Clade: Asterids
- Order: Gentianales
- Family: Rubiaceae
- Genus: Galium
- Species: G. aschenbornii

Binomial name
- Galium aschenbornii S. Schauer

Synonyms
- Galium flaccidum Wedd.; Galium fraseri Wernham; Galium galeottianum Walp.; Galium geminiflorum M. Martens & Galeotti 1844, illegitimate homonym of G. geminiflorum Lowe 1838; Galium uropetalum Hemsl.; Relbunium aschenbornii (Schauer) Hemsl.; Rubia acuminata M. Martens & Galeotti; Rubia debilis Kunth

Species of flowering plant

Galium aschenbornii is a species of flowering plant in the genus Galium, native to Mexico, Central America, Colombia and Ecuador.

== Description ==
Galium aschenbornii is a climbing or trailing plant, with leaves in whorls of four, each leaf being 7–15 millimetres (0.3–0.6 in) long. Its flowers are typically red or pink (occasionally white, yellow or greenish) and actinomorphic with elongated corolla lobes, although few flowers are normally produced.

== Distribution ==
Galium aschenbornii is found in mountainous regions of Mexico, as far north as Jalisco and San Luis Potosí, and south through Central America to Ecuador. It lives at altitudes of 1,200–3,500 metres (3,900–11,500 ft) in "moist slopes, meadows or streambanks, in open or dense forests of oak and conifers".
