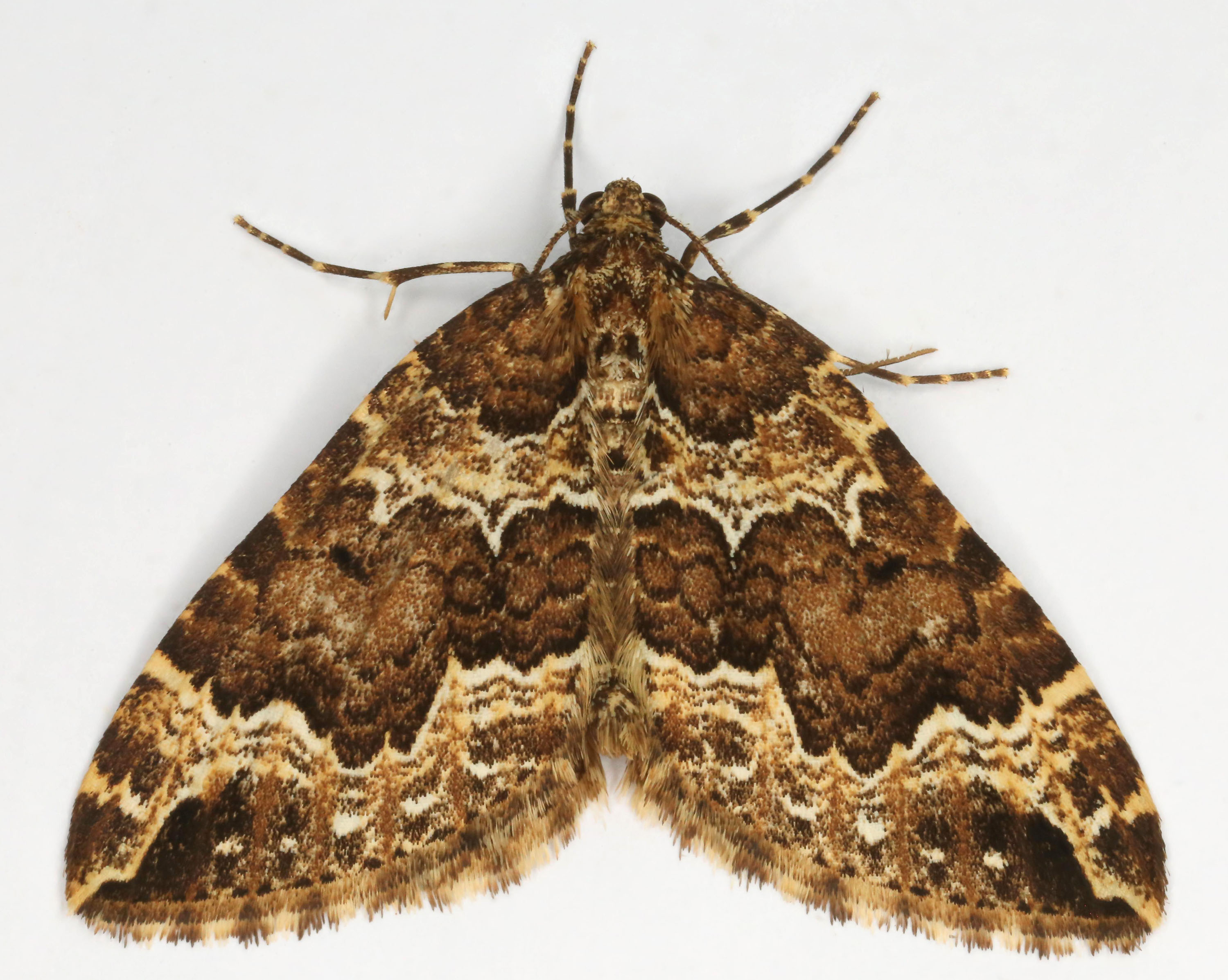

Scientific classification
- Kingdom: Animalia
- Phylum: Arthropoda
- Clade: Pancrustacea
- Class: Insecta
- Order: Lepidoptera
- Family: Geometridae
- Genus: Lampropteryx
- Species: L. suffumata

Binomial name
- Lampropteryx suffumata (Denis & Schiffermüller, 1775)

Synonyms
- Geometra suffumata Denis & Schiffermüller, 1775; Cidaria arctica Sparre-Schneider, 1895

= Lampropteryx suffumata =

Water carpet

Species of moth

Lampropteryx suffumata, the water carpet, is a moth of the family Geometridae. It is found from Europe to the Altai Mountains, Khabarovsk Krai and the Kamchatka Peninsula in the far east of Russia, and Hokkaido, Japan. In 2000, the species was discovered in Alaska, United States, and then in 2008 DNA-barcoding analysis of museum specimens identified several Canadian specimens, thereby extending the geographical range from Ireland in the west, across Eurasia, to the west of North America. The habitat consists of damp woodland, grassy areas, chalk downland and scrubland.

== Description ==
The wingspan is 25–32 mm. The ground colour is brownish. Between the wingbase and the midfield, as well as between the central and margin field is a whitish lateral band. The dark midfield is serrated on both sides. The outer cross-line limiting the midfield and shows a clearly protruding double wave. The margin field is heavily obscured below the apex. The hind wings are pale grey and have a strongly curved dark cross line.

In northern Europe, adults are in the wing from March to June in one generation.

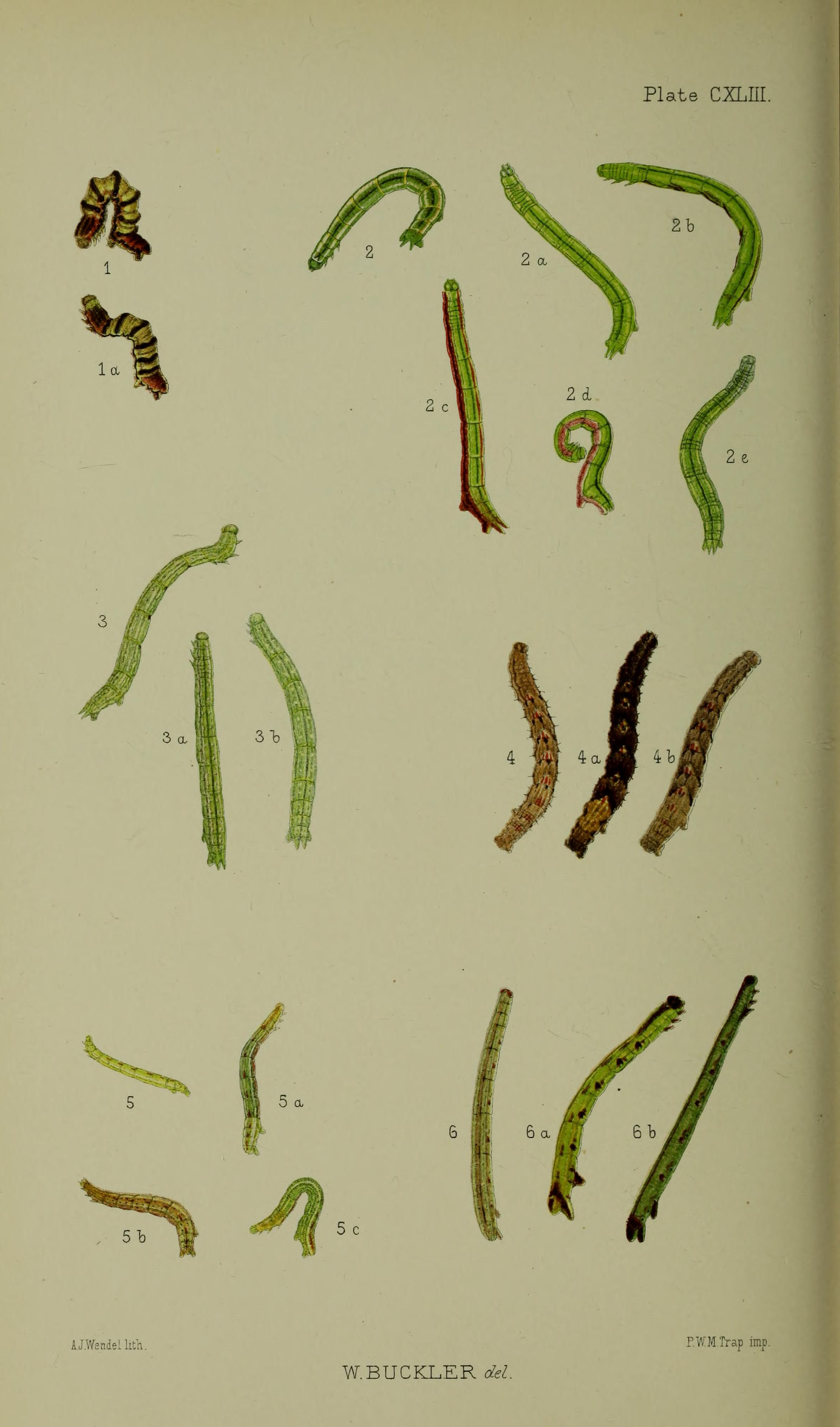
Figs.4, 4a, 4b larvae after final moult

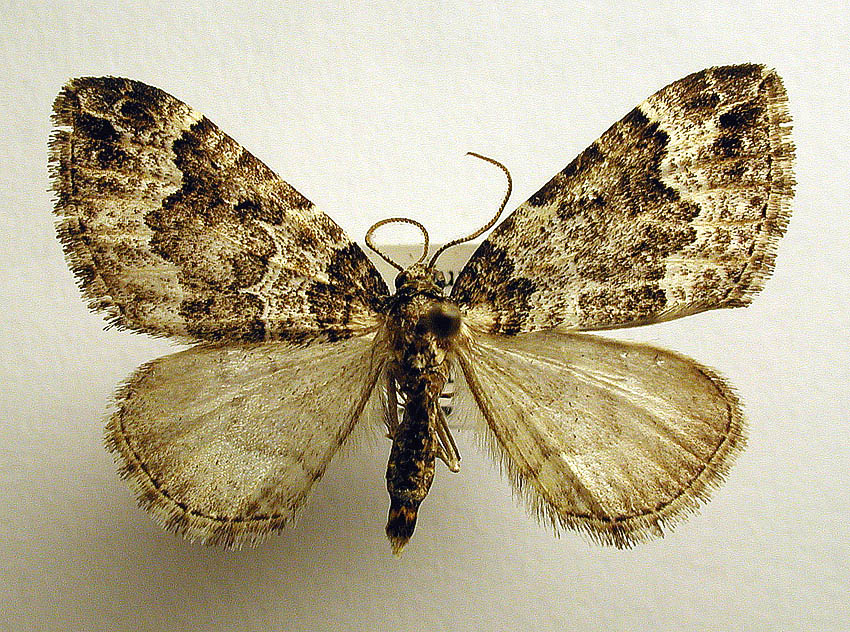

Larvae

Adult caterpillars have a brown basic coloration. On the dorsum, there is reddish-brown to black-brown angled spots. The rear segments are lighter brown. The larvae feed on Galium species (often known as bedstraws) and can be found in May and June.

Pupa

It overwinters in the pupal stage, in a substantial, silken cocoon spun among the foodplant.

== Subspecies and aberrations ==
- Lampropteryx suffumata suffumata
- Lampropteryx suffumata arctica Sparre-Schneider, 189
- Lampropteryx suffumata ab. piceata Stephens
- Lampropteryx suffumata ab. porrittii

== Similar species ==
- Devon carpet (Lampropteryx otregiata) flies, in two generations, in May and June and again in August and September. The larvae are similar and also feed on bedstraws, but pupate in leaf litter on the ground.

== Etymology ==
The genus Lampropteryx was raised by the English entomologist, James Francis Stephens in 1831. The name is from the Greek (lampros, a wing) and (pteryx, bright); referring to the ″strong gloss on the forewings …″. The specific name suffumata is from the Latin (sub, somewhat) and (fumatus, smoky or smoked) and the authors Denis and Schiffermüller may have had ab. piceata Stephens before them. Ab. piceata (piceus, pitch-black) also has very glossy forewings.
