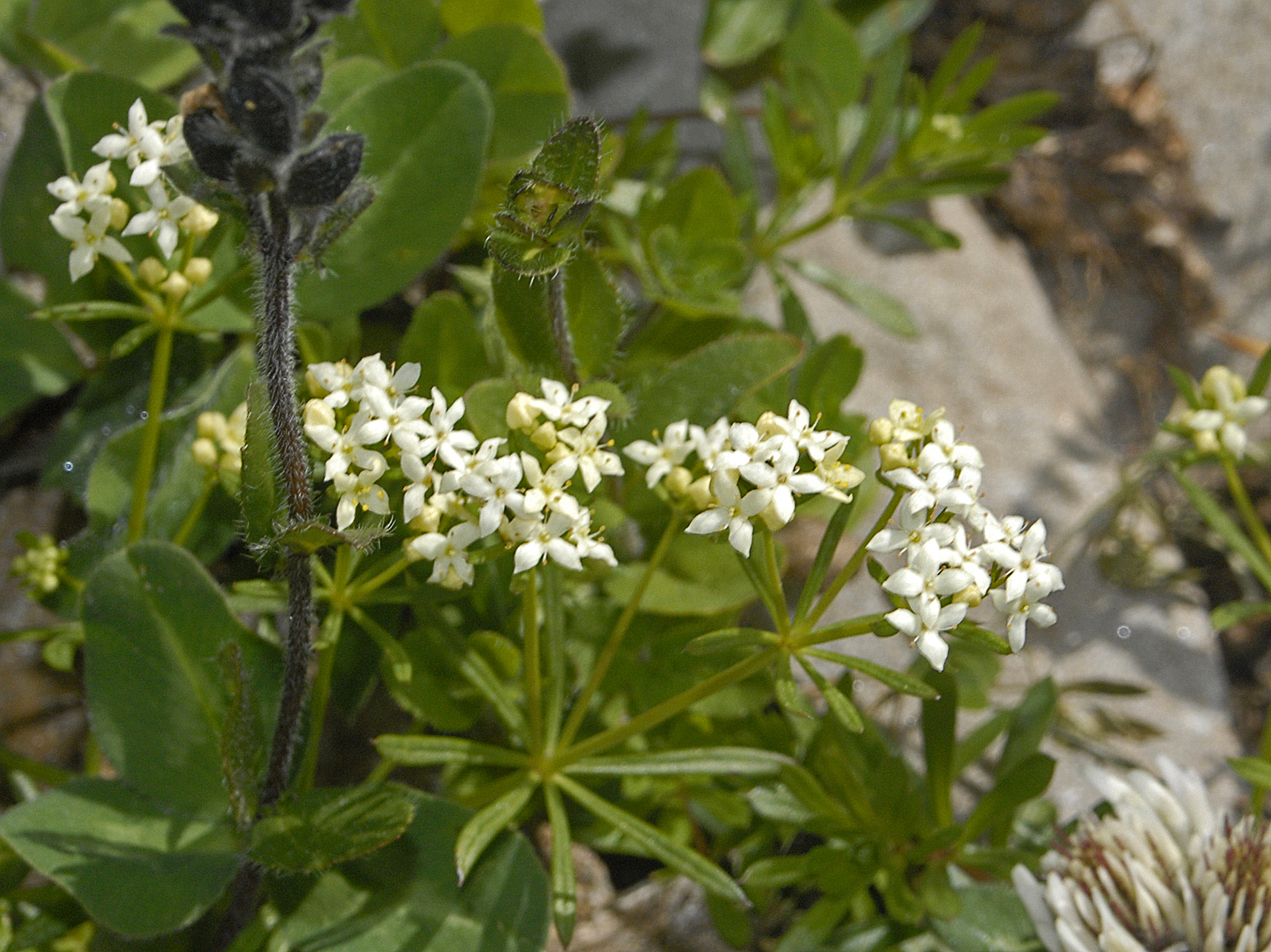
- Galium cf. anisophyllon in flower

Scientific classification
- Kingdom: Plantae
- Clade: Tracheophytes
- Clade: Angiosperms
- Clade: Eudicots
- Clade: Asterids
- Order: Gentianales
- Family: Rubiaceae
- Genus: Galium
- Species: G. anisophyllon

Binomial name
- Galium anisophyllon Vill.

Synonyms
- Galium anisophyllon subsp. bavaricum Ehrend.; Galium sudeticum Tausch.

= Galium anisophyllon =

Species of plant

Galium anisophyllon, common name bedstraw or gaillet, is a flowering perennial plant in the family Rubiaceae.

== Description ==
Galium anisophyllon can reach a height of 5–25 centimetres (2.0–9.8 in). It is a herbaceous plant with quadrangular and branched stems, oblong or lanceolate-linear leaves, 15 mm long and 2 mm wide. Flowers are white to yellowish-white, in loose umbels. Corolla is up to 4 mm wide. They bloom from June to September.

== Distribution and habitat ==
Galium anisophyllon is widespread in Central and Southern Europe from France to Poland and Ukraine. It is present in the mountains, in meadows, rocky crevices and in forests, at altitudes above 1000 m.

== Subspecies ==
Two subspecies are currently recognized (May 2014):

- Galium anisophyllon subsp. anisophyllon - most of species range
- Galium anisophyllon subsp. plebeium (Boiss. & Heldr.) Ehrend - Balkan Peninsula
