= Microphysa (disambiguation) =

Microphysa may refer to:

- Microphysa Schrenk, a genus of plants in the family Rubiaceae
- Microphysa Naudin, a genus of plants in the family Melastomataceae, synonym of Miconia
- Microphysa Guenée, a genus of butterflies in the family Erebidae, synonym of Eublemma
- Microphysa E. von Martens, a genus of gastropods in the family Sagdidae, synonym of Hojeda
