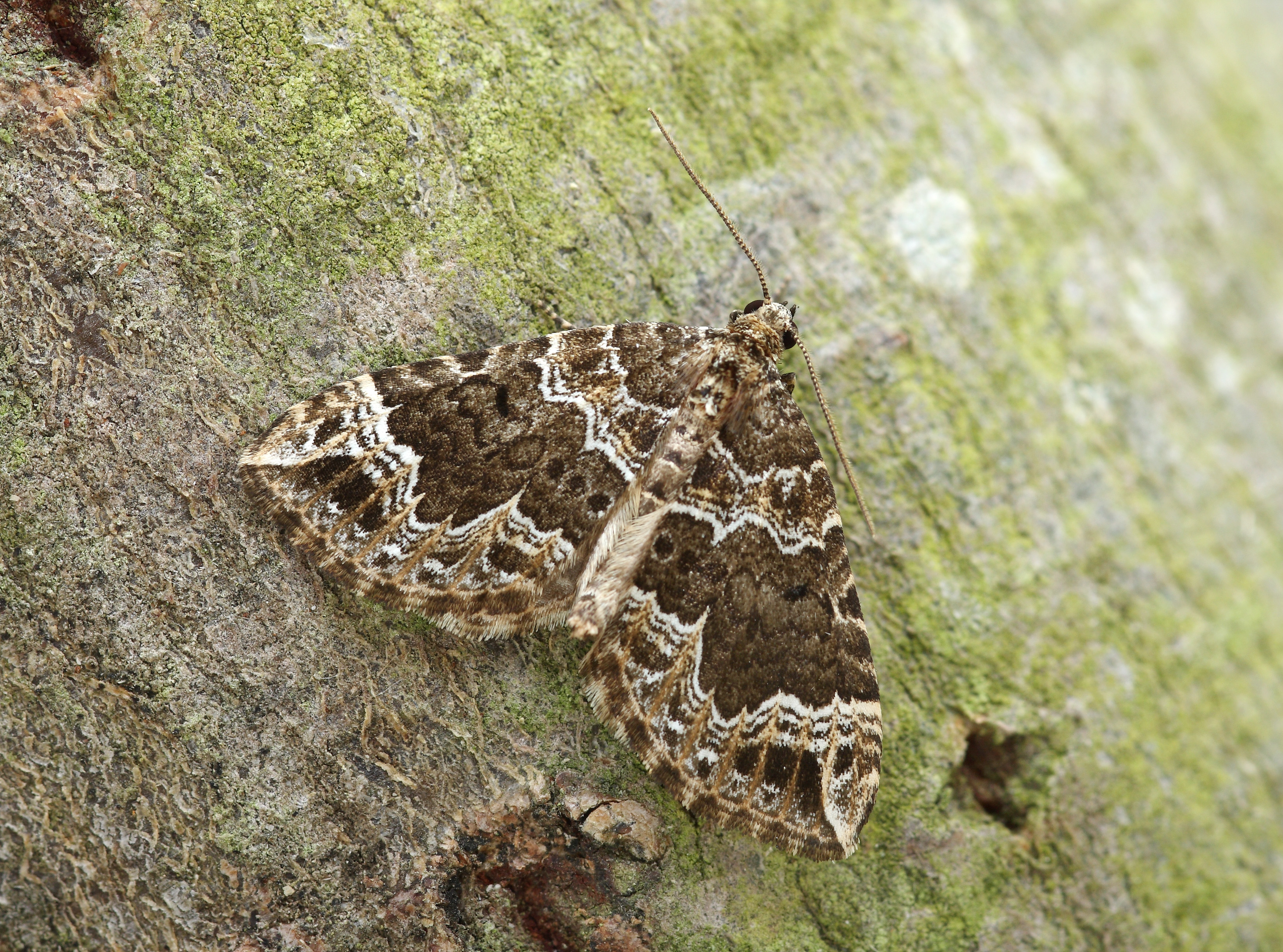

Scientific classification
- Kingdom: Animalia
- Phylum: Arthropoda
- Clade: Pancrustacea
- Class: Insecta
- Order: Lepidoptera
- Family: Geometridae
- Genus: Lampropteryx
- Species: L. otregiata

Binomial name
- Lampropteryx otregiata (Metcalfe, 1917)

Synonyms
- Cidaria otregiata Metcalfe, 1917

= Lampropteryx otregiata =

Devon carpet

Species of moth

Lampropteryx otregiata, the Devon carpet, is a moth of the family Geometridae. It is found in western Europe (from Scandinavia south to the Alps) to Japan and the Kuril Islands. The species was described in 1917 by the English entomologist, the reverend Metcalfe, from a type species found at Ottery St Mary, Devon.

== Description ==
The wingspan is 27–30 mm. It is medium-sized, slender, brownish-grey moth. It can resemble several other species, but can be recognized by the presence of several, usually distinct, dark rings in the posterior part of the broad transverse band of the forewings. The forewing is pale brownish-grey, in the middle with a broad, brownish-grey (lighter than in many other species) transverse bands. This is sharply angular and edged with a double, white stripe. In the posterior part of the transverse band there are 3 – 4 dark rings. At the tip of the wing there is a white slash, along the outer edge of the wing some white and dark brown (bicolored) spots. The hind wing is silky white, the hind corner darker.

There are two generations per year, with adults on wing in May and June and again in August and September.

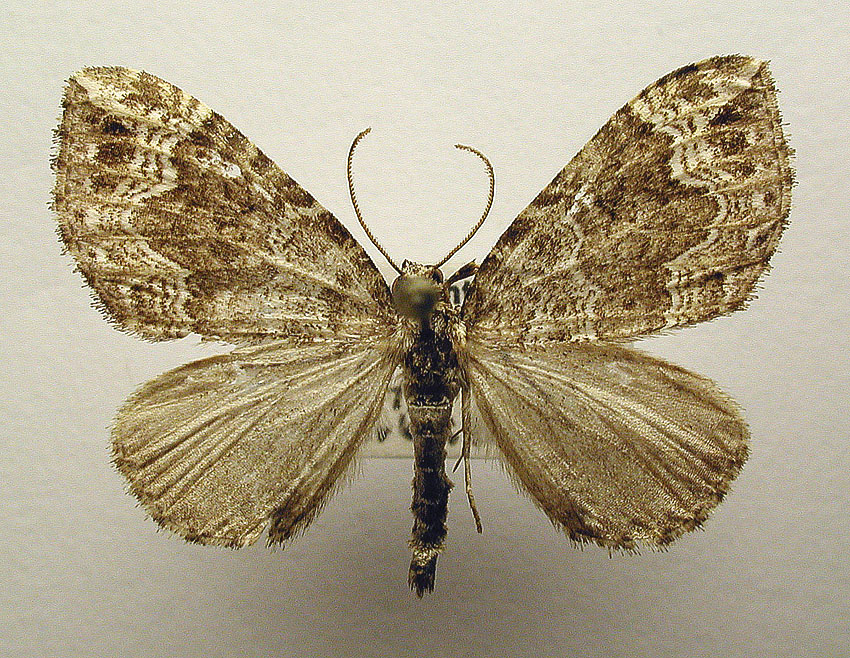

Larvae

The larva is yellowish-brown, slightly lighter on the posterior joints. The body appears somewhat knotty and has some short, protruding bristles. On the middle dorsal segments, it has U-shaped, dark spots with a dark brown spot in the middle of the U. The larvae feed on woodruff (Asperula species) and bedstraw (Galium species); including marsh-bedstraw (Galium palustre) and fen bedstraw (Galium uliginosum). Larvae can be found from July to August and overwinters in the pupal stage.

=== Subspecies ===
- Lampropteryx otregiata otregiata
- Lampropteryx otregiata dubitatrix (Bryk, 1942)

=== Similar species ===
- Lampropteryx suffumata

== Etymology ==
The genus Lampropteryx was raised by the English entomologist, James Francis Stephens in 1831. The name is from the Greek (lampros, a wing) and (pteryx, bright); referring to the ″strong gloss on the forewings …″. A. Maitland Emmet states that ″the authors may have had ab.piceata Stephens before them (piceus, pitch-black) which also has very glossy forewings ...″. The name of the species otregiata is from the Latin (Otregia, the Latin name for Ottery St Mary in Devon) which is the locality of the type species, and hence the English name, Devon carpet.
