= × Galiasperula =

Scientific classification
- Kingdom: Plantae
- Clade: Tracheophytes
- Clade: Angiosperms
- Clade: Eudicots
- Clade: Asterids
- Order: Gentianales
- Family: Rubiaceae
- Subfamily: Rubioideae
- Tribe: Rubieae
- Genus: × Galiasperula; Ronniger
- Species: × G. ferdinandi-coburgii

Binomial name
- × Galiasperula ferdinandi-coburgii (J.Wagner) ined.

Synonyms
- Genus: × Asperugalium P.Fourn.; Species: Galium × ferdinandi-coburgii J.Wagner

Genus of plants

× Galiasperula is a monotypic genus of flowering plants in the family Rubiaceae. The genus contains only one species, × Galiasperula ferdinandi-coburgii, which is a hybrid of Asperula purpurea and Galium degenii. It is found in south-east Europe.
