= Hexaphylla =

Scientific classification
- Kingdom: Plantae
- Clade: Tracheophytes
- Clade: Angiosperms
- Clade: Eudicots
- Clade: Asterids
- Order: Gentianales
- Family: Rubiaceae
- Subfamily: Rubioideae
- Tribe: Rubieae
- Genus: Hexaphylla (Klokov) P.Caputo & Del Guacchio

Species
- 12; see text

Genus of flowering plants

Hexaphylla is a genus of flowering plants in the family Rubiaceae. It includes 12 species native to the western and central Mediterranean region, Balkans, Crimea, and the Caucasus.

- Hexaphylla allionii P.Caputo & Del Guacchio
- Hexaphylla arcadiensis (Sims) P.Caputo & Del Guacchio
- Hexaphylla capitata (Kit. ex Schult.) P.Caputo & Del Guacchio
- Hexaphylla cretacea (Willd.) P.Caputo & Del Guacchio
- Hexaphylla cyrenaica (E.A.Durand & Barratte) P.Caputo & Del Guacchio
- Hexaphylla doerfleri (Wettst.) P.Caputo & Del Guacchio
- Hexaphylla hercegovina (Degen) P.Caputo & Del Guacchio
- Hexaphylla hirsuta (Desf.) P.Caputo & Del Guacchio
- Hexaphylla hirta (Ramond) P.Caputo & Del Guacchio
- Hexaphylla pubescens (Willd.) P.Caputo & Del Guacchio
- Hexaphylla rupestris (Tineo) P.Caputo & Del Guacchio
- Hexaphylla taygetea (Boiss. & Heldr.) P.Caputo & Del Guacchio
