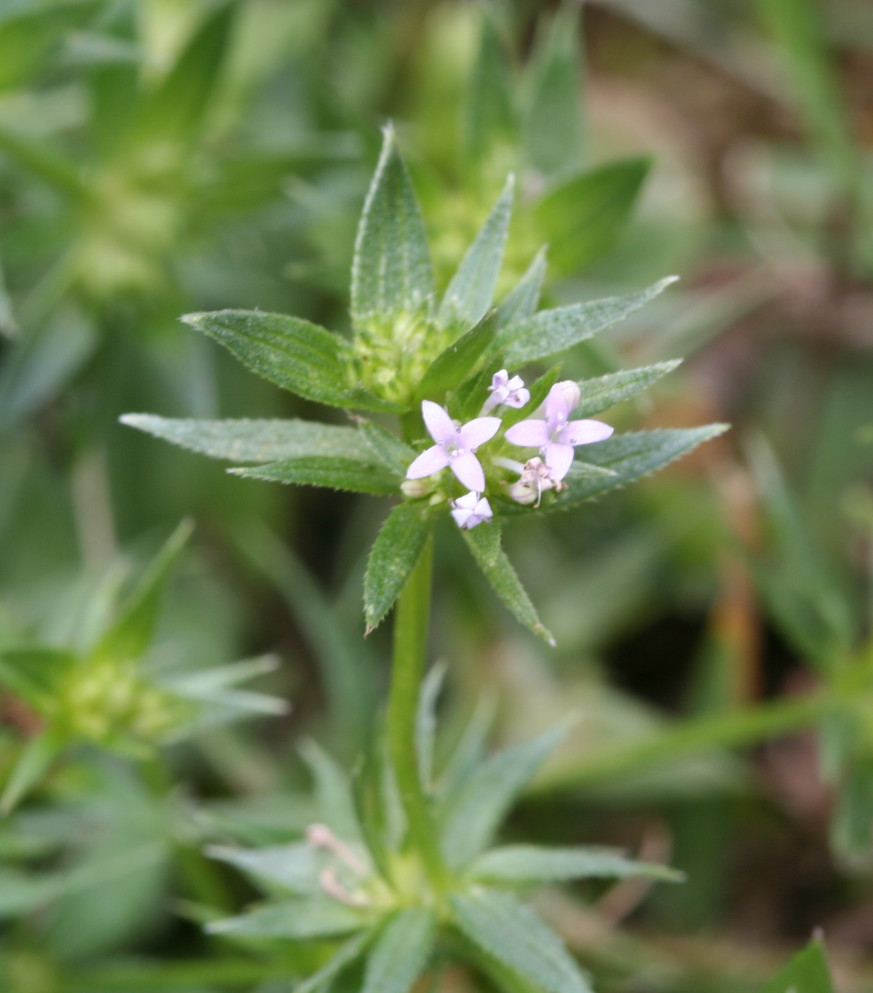
- Sherardia arvensis

Scientific classification
- Kingdom: Plantae
- Clade: Embryophytes
- Clade: Tracheophytes
- Clade: Angiosperms
- Clade: Eudicots
- Clade: Asterids
- Order: Gentianales
- Family: Rubiaceae
- Subfamily: Rubioideae
- Tribe: Rubieae
- Genus: Sherardia; L.
- Species: S. arvensis

Binomial name
- Sherardia arvensis L.

Synonyms
- Asperula sherardia Hallier; Asterophyllum scherardianum Schimp. & Spenn.; Galium sherardia E.H.L.Krause; Hexodontocarpus arvensis (L.) Dulac; Sherardia affinis Gand.; Sherardia agraria Tornab.; Sherardia elliptica Gand.; Sherardia maritima (Griseb.) Borbás; Sherardia pantocsekii Gand.; Sherardia umbellata Gilib.

= Sherardia =

Blue field-madder

Genus and species of flowering plant

Sherardia is a monotypic genus of flowering plants in the family Rubiaceae. The genus contains only one species, Sherardia arvensis, the (blue) field madder, which is widespread across most of Europe and northern Africa as well as southwest and central Asia (from Turkey to Saudi Arabia to Kazakhstan) and Macaronesia (Canary Islands, Azores, Madeira, Savage Islands). It is also reportedly naturalized in Australia, New Zealand, Taiwan, Kerguelen, Ethiopia, Sudan, southern Africa, Mexico, Costa Rica, South America, Bermuda, Cuba, Haiti and much of Canada and the United States (especially the Pacific States and the lower Mississippi Valley).

== Description ==
Sherardia arvensis is an annual plant with trailing and upright stems growing up to 40 cm (16 in) long, having a square cross-section. The rough pointed bristly leaves of about 1 cm (0.39 in) in length are in whorls of four to six (normally six at the ends of the shoots, but four nearer the root).

The tiny pale lilac or pink flowers are approximately 3 mm (0.12 in) in diameter and have a long tube, with only the end part of the four petals free. The flowers grow in clusters of two or three together in an involucral structure formed out of a ring of six bracts.

The fruit are dry and about 3 mm (0.12 in) long with two lobes giving rise to two small, dry, indehiscent fruits called nutlets.

The four-angled stems with whorls of bristly leaves and tiny flowers are reminiscent of the Bedstraws and other related Rubiaceae, but Sherardia is distinguished by its mauve/pink flowers that are organized in clusters and having a long corolla tube.

Sherardia arvensis plants are hermaphroditic and pollinated by flies.

== Uses ==
Sherardia arvensis is a common weed of fields, pasture, grassland, and disturbed areas. The fleshy roots, though much inferior to the common madder (Rubia tinctorum), are sometimes used for the production of a red dye.

== Taxonomy ==
The genus and species were described by Carl Linnaeus in Hortus Cliffortianus in 1736 and also appeared in his masterwork Species Plantarum in 1753. The genus was named in memory of the prominent English botanist William Sherard (1659–1728). The Latin epithet arvensis means that it is found in fields.

== Image gallery ==
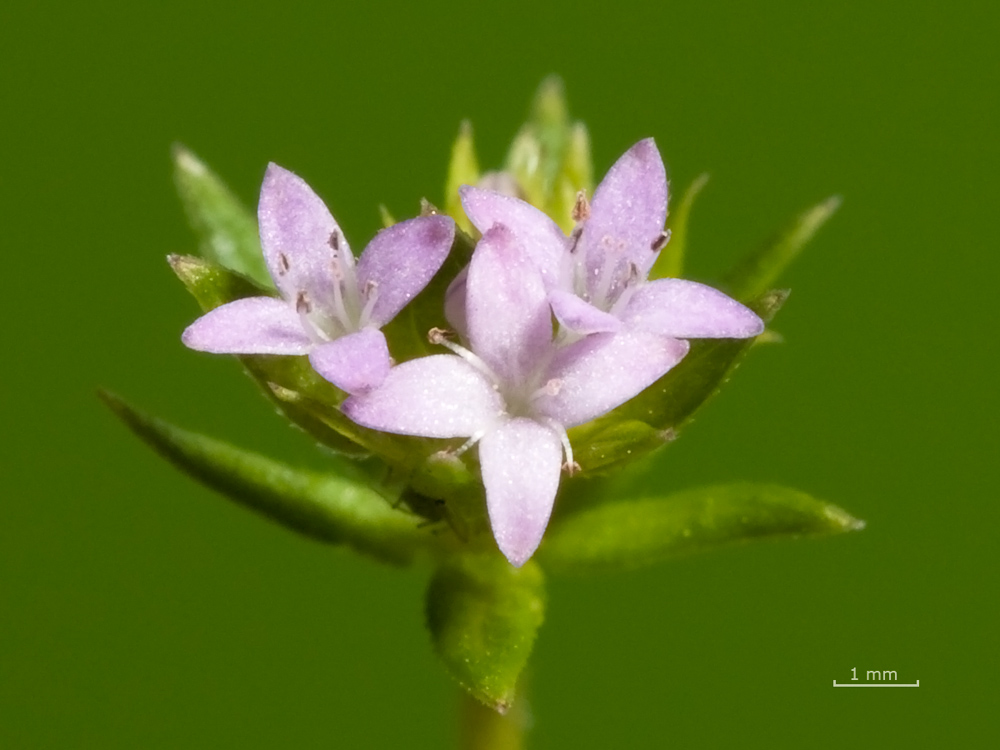

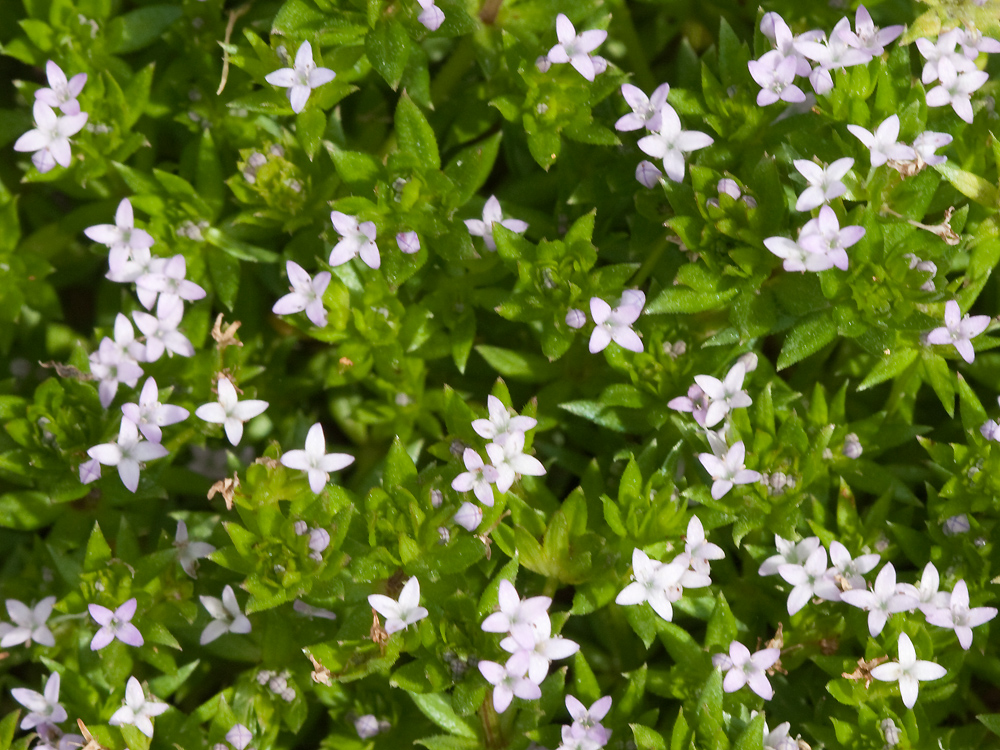

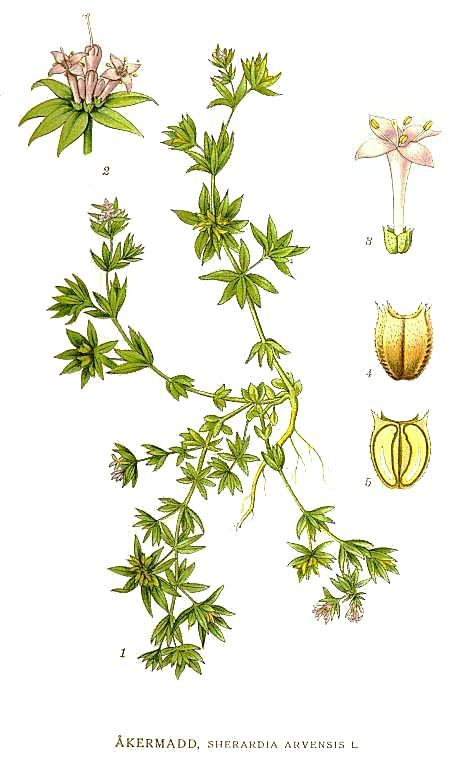
