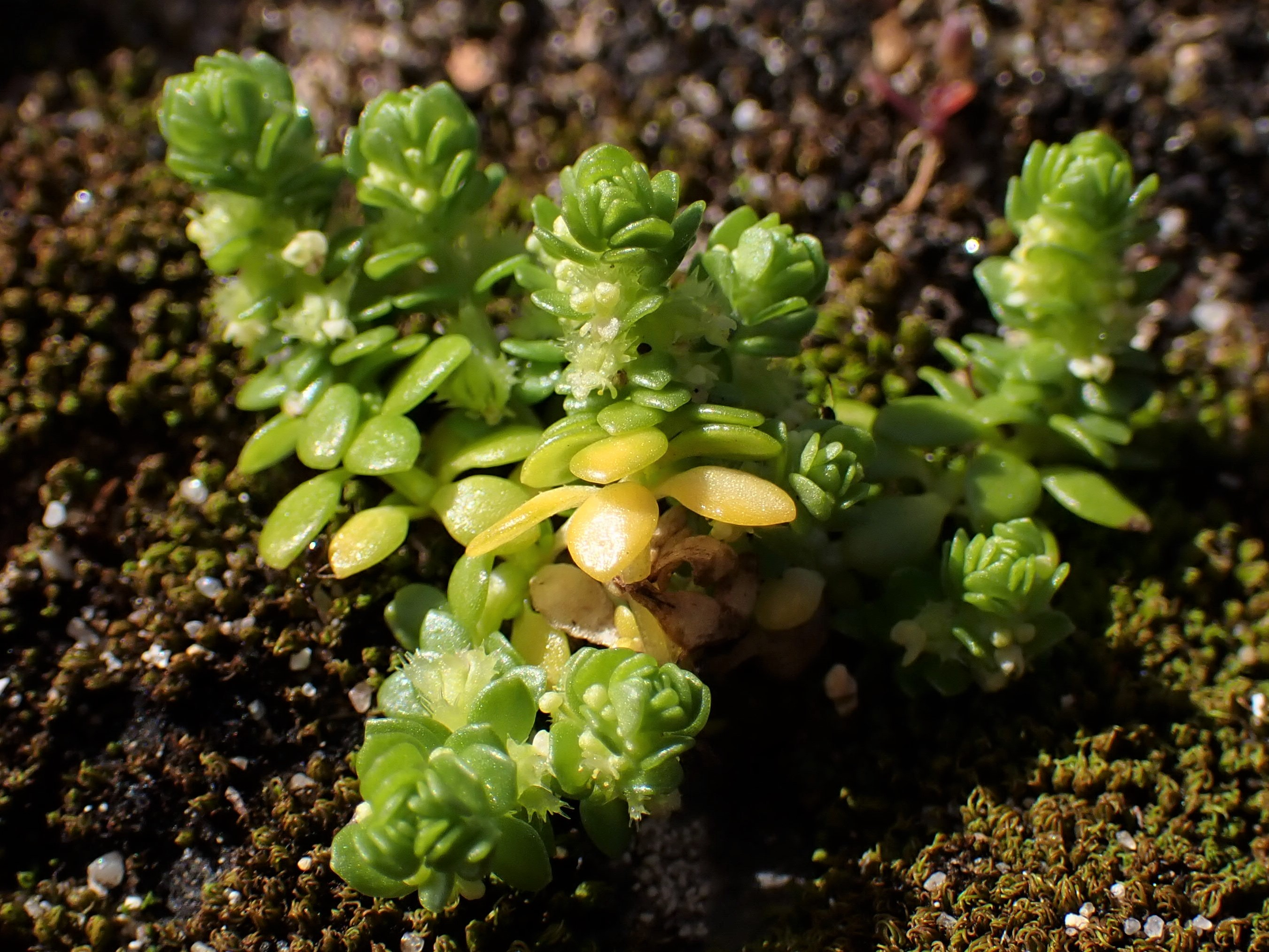

Scientific classification
- Kingdom: Plantae
- Clade: Tracheophytes
- Clade: Angiosperms
- Clade: Eudicots
- Clade: Asterids
- Order: Gentianales
- Family: Rubiaceae
- Genus: Valantia
- Species: V. muralis

Binomial name
- Valantia muralis L.

= Valantia muralis =

Species of plant

Valantia muralis is a species of annual herb in the family Rubiaceae. They have a self-supporting growth form and simple, broad leaves. Individuals can grow to 3.2 cm.

== Gallery ==
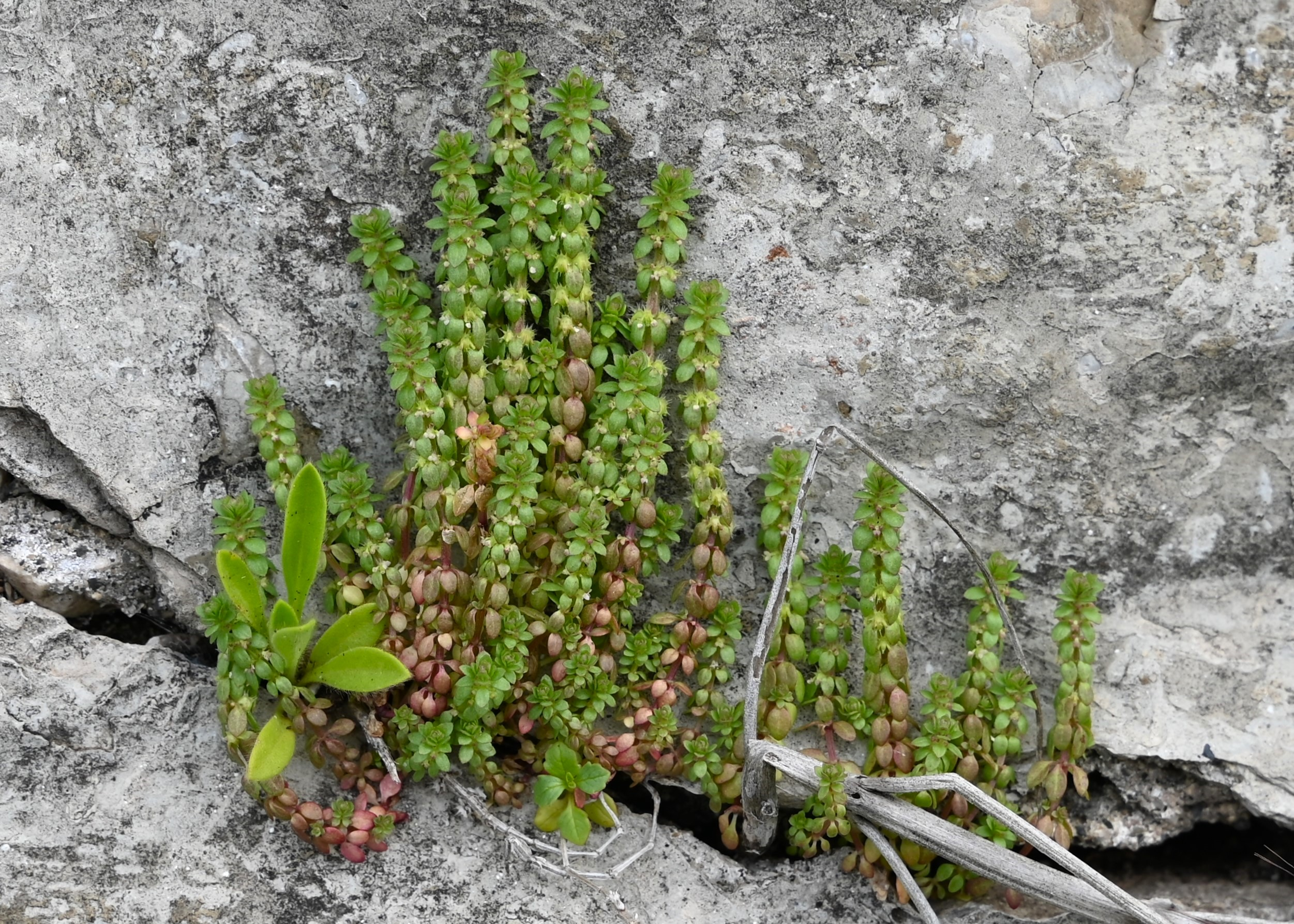
Habitat

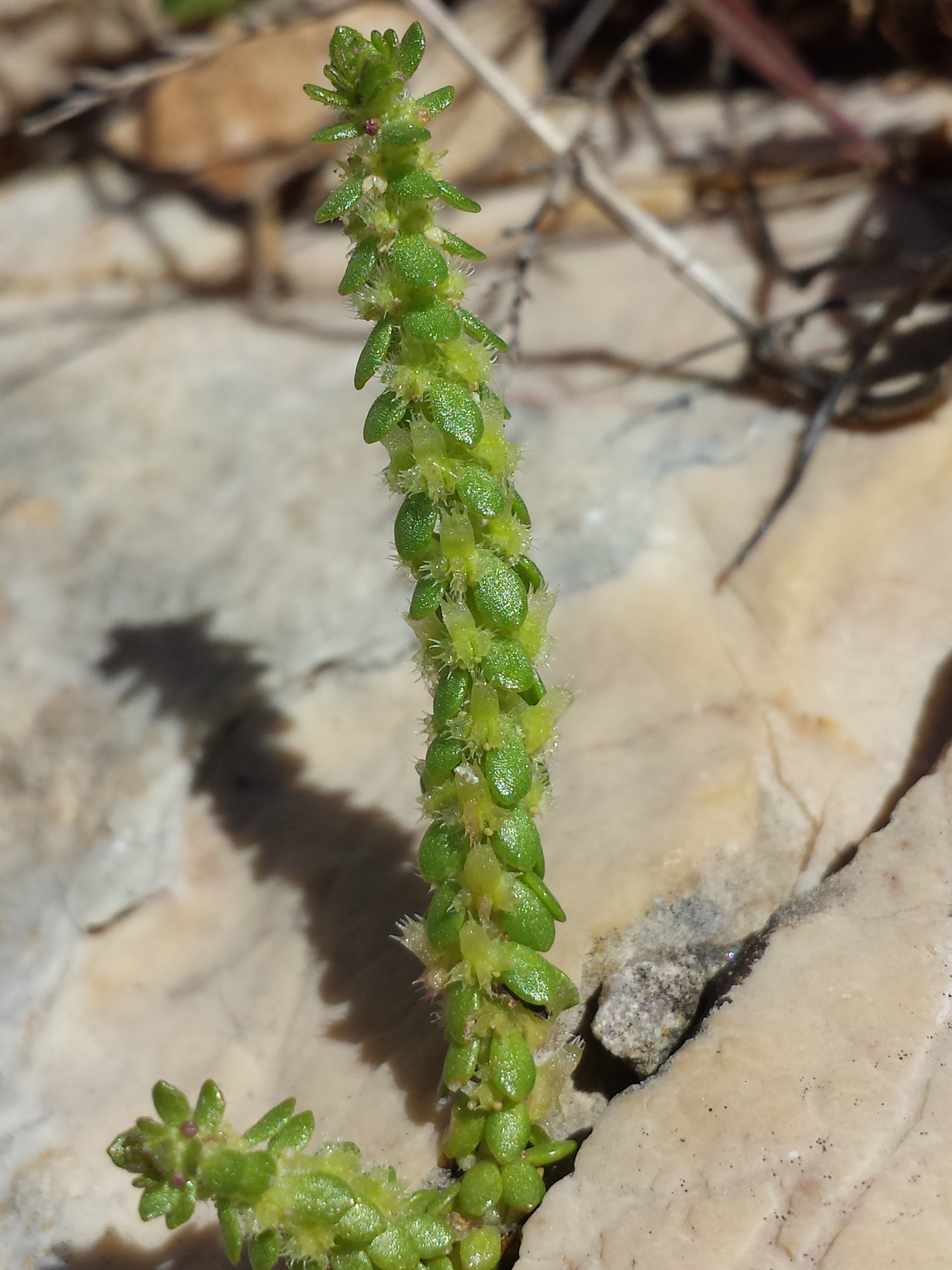
Inflorescence

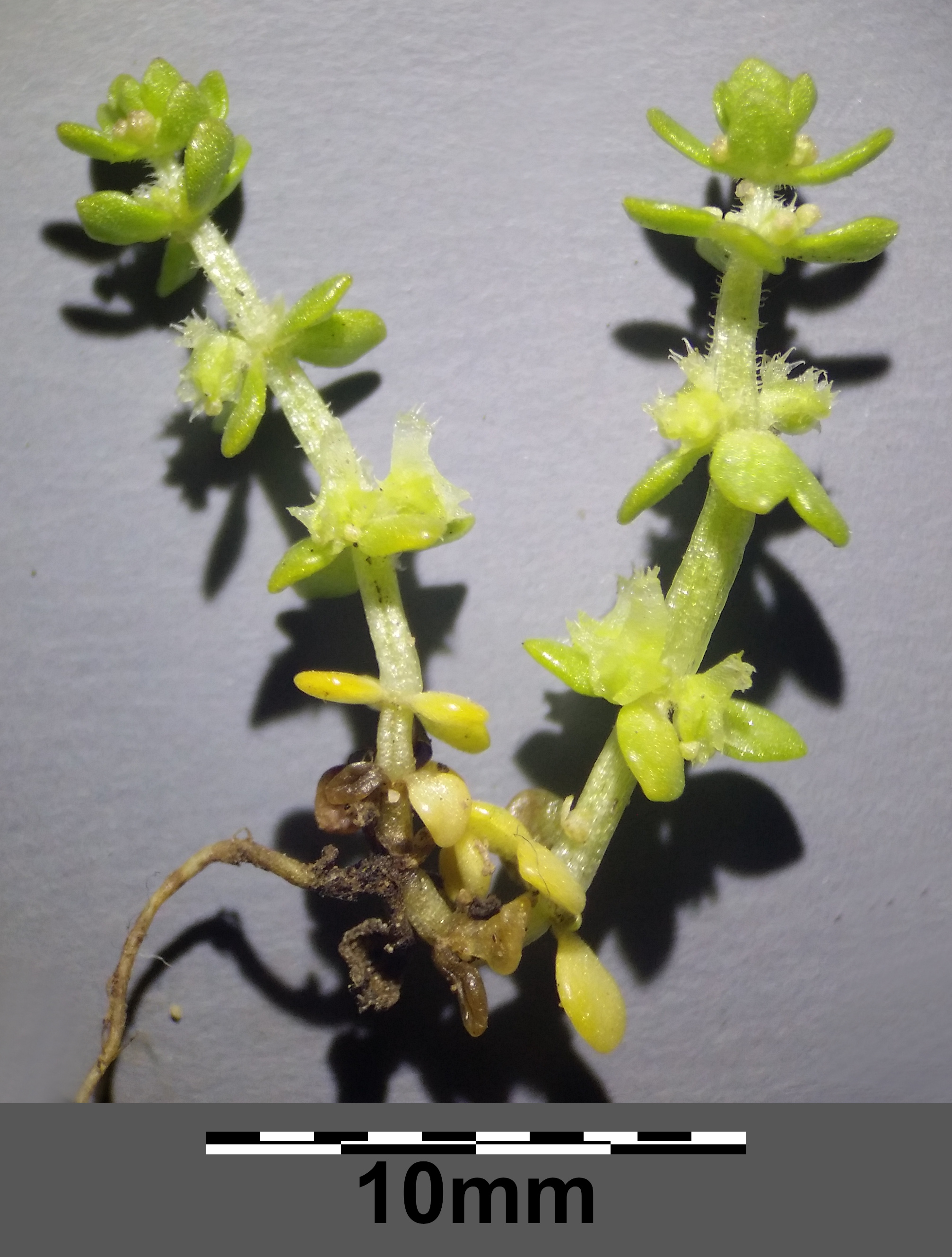
Habit

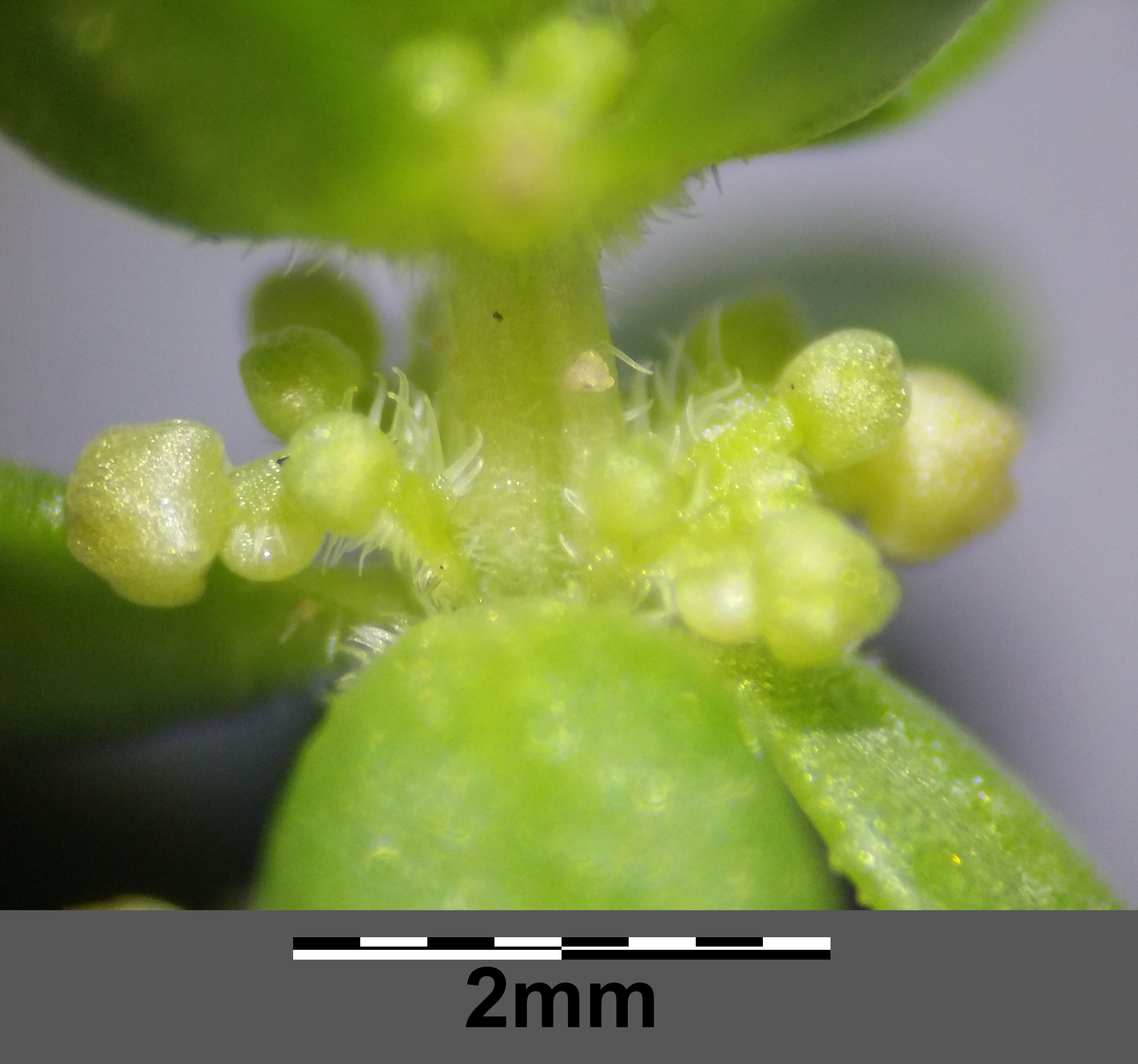
Budding

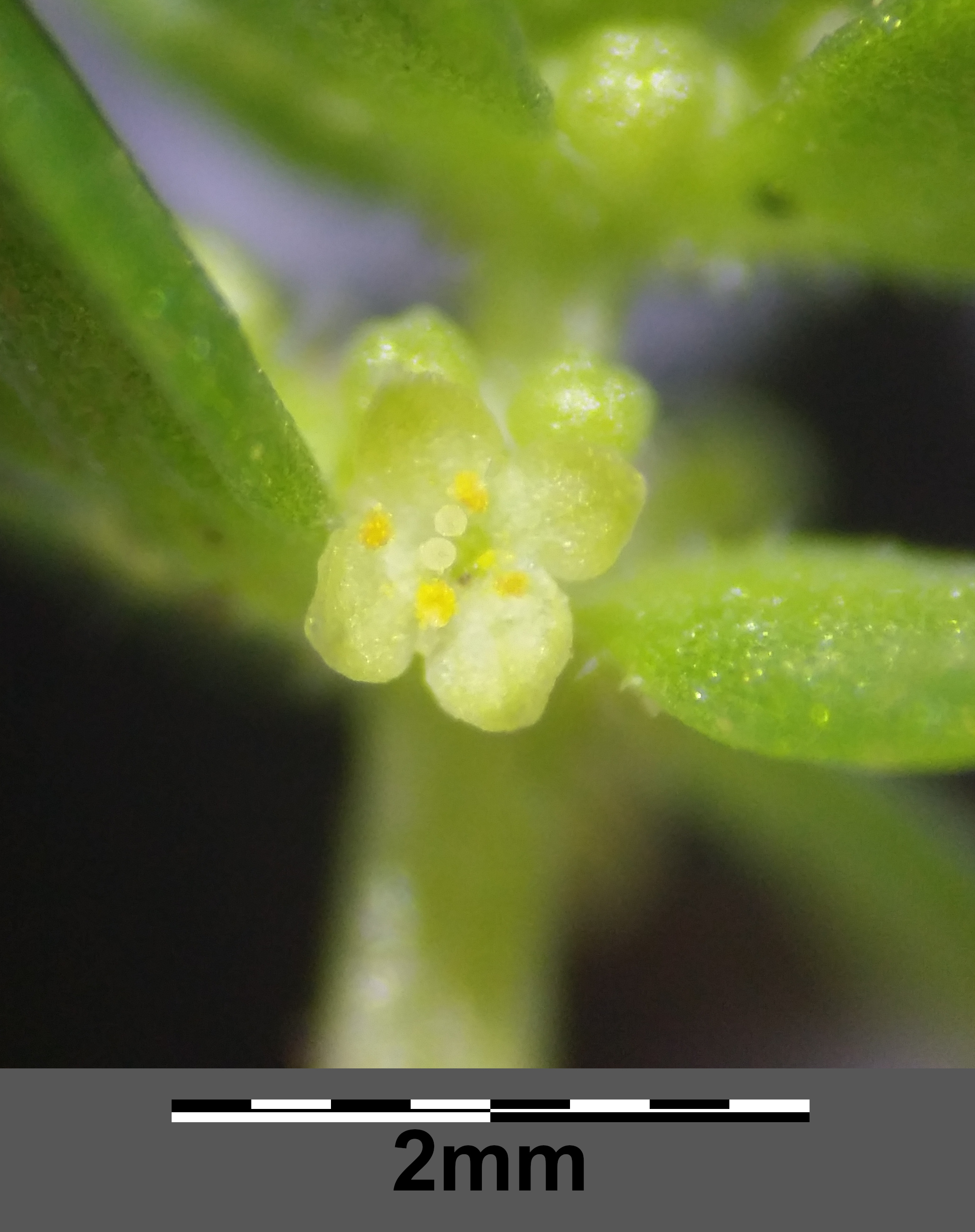
Flower

== Sources ==
This article incorporates text from a free content work. Licensed under CC0 (license statement/permission). Text taken from Valantia muralis. Encyclopedia of Life.
