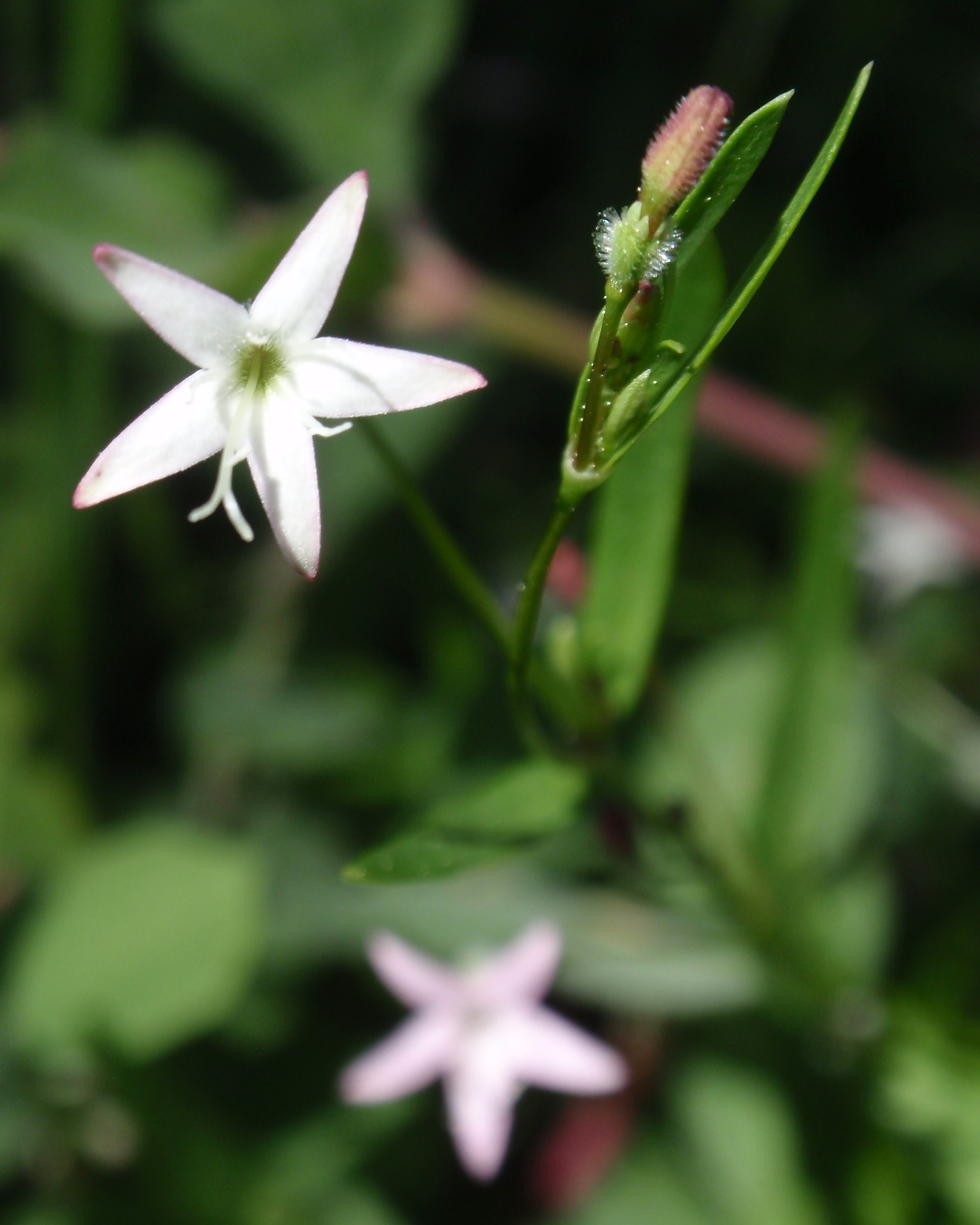
- Kelloggia galioides

Scientific classification
- Kingdom: Plantae
- Clade: Tracheophytes
- Clade: Angiosperms
- Clade: Eudicots
- Clade: Asterids
- Order: Gentianales
- Family: Rubiaceae
- Subfamily: Rubioideae
- Tribe: Rubieae
- Genus: Kelloggia; Torr. ex Benth. & Hook.f.

Species
- See text.

= Kelloggia =

Genus of plants

Kelloggia is a plant genus in the bedstraw and madder family, Rubiaceae. Its two species have a discontinuous distribution; one species is native to Bhutan and China (Sichuan and Yunnan), the other to the western United States.

== Species ==
As of March 2023, Plants of the World Online accepted the following species:

- Kelloggia chinensis Franch. – Bhutan and China (Sichuan and Yunnan)
- Kelloggia galioides Torr. – western United States
