= Didymaea =

Scientific classification
- Kingdom: Plantae
- Clade: Tracheophytes
- Clade: Angiosperms
- Clade: Eudicots
- Clade: Asterids
- Order: Gentianales
- Family: Rubiaceae
- Subfamily: Rubioideae
- Tribe: Rubieae
- Genus: Didymaea; Hook.f.

Type species
- Didymaea mexicana Hook.f.

Synonyms
- Balfourina Kuntze

Genus of plants

Didymaea is a genus of flowering plants in the family Rubiaceae. The genus is found from Mexico to Central America.

== Species ==
- Didymaea alsinoides (Cham. & Schltdl.) Standl. - Mexico
- Didymaea ixtepejiensis Borhidi & E.Martinez - Oaxaca
- Didymaea linearis Standl. - Jalisco
- Didymaea mexicana Hook.f. - Mexico, Costa Rica, El Salvador, Guatemala, Honduras, Nicaragua, Panama
- Didymaea naniflora Borhidi & E.Martinez - Oaxaca
