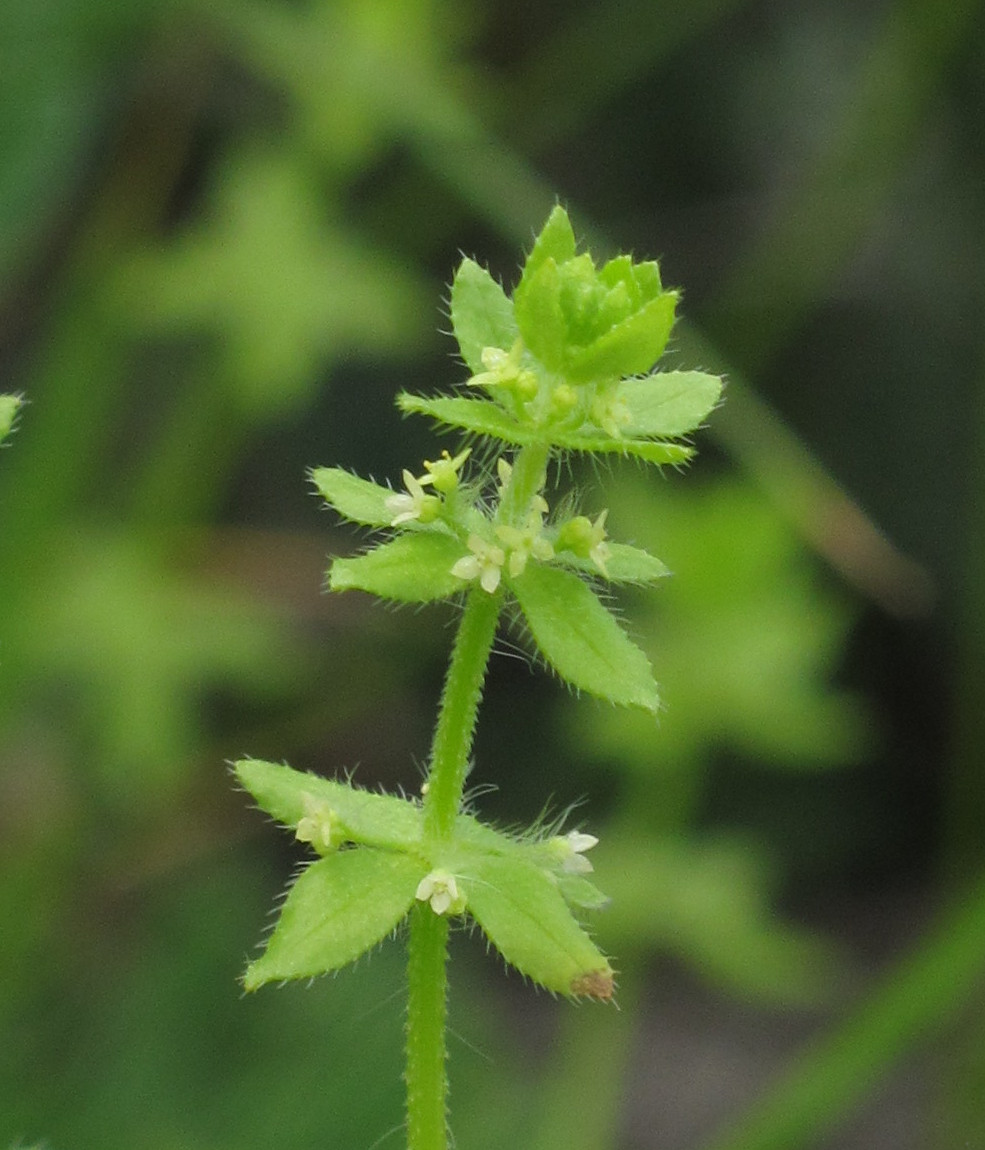
- Stalk of Piedmont bedstraw

Scientific classification
- Kingdom: Plantae
- Clade: Tracheophytes
- Clade: Angiosperms
- Clade: Eudicots
- Clade: Asterids
- Order: Gentianales
- Family: Rubiaceae
- Genus: Cruciata
- Species: C. pedemontana

Binomial name
- Cruciata pedemontana (Bellardi) Ehrend.

Synonyms
- Galium pedemontanum (Bellardi) All.; Valantia pedemontana Bellardi

= Cruciata pedemontana =

Piedmont bedstraw

Species of plant

Cruciata pedemontana, the Piedmont bedstraw, is a species of plant in the Rubiaceae. It is native to the southern and central Europe, the Black Sea Basin, and southwestern and Central Asia from Turkey to Iran to Kazakhstan. It is also naturalized in parts of the United States (south-central and eastern parts from Texas to New York, plus the northwest from Washington and Oregon to Montana).

Cruciata pedemontana is an erect herb up to 30 cm (12 in), covered with stiff hairs. Leaves are broadly ovate, usually four per node. Flowers are tiny, rarely more than 1 mm (0.039 in) across, axillary, pale yellow.

== Varieties ==
Two varieties are recognized (as of May 2014):

- Cruciata pedemontana var. pedemontana
- Cruciata pedemontana var. procumbens (Asch.) Soó - France and Italy (including Corsica and Sardinia)
