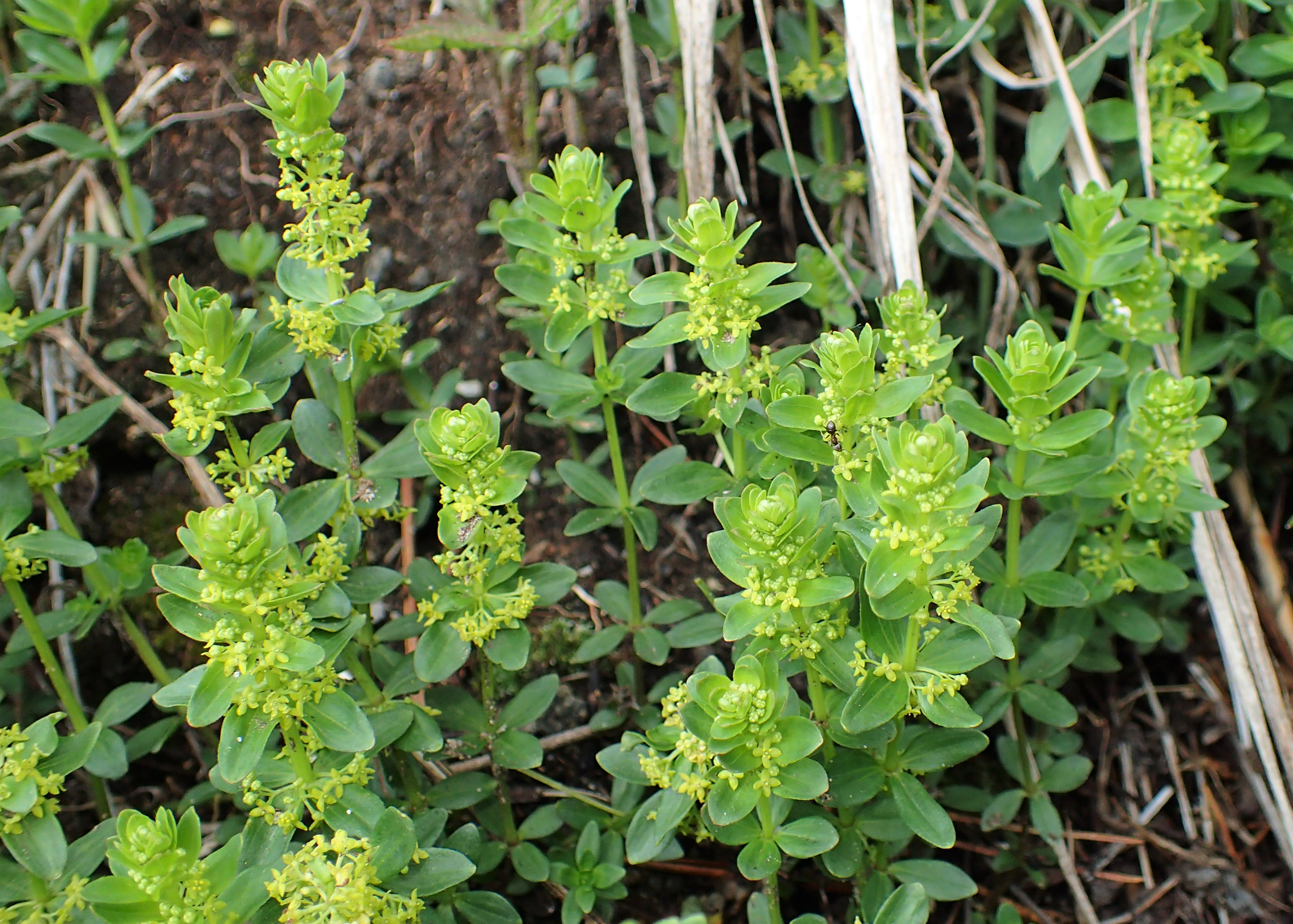

Scientific classification
- Kingdom: Plantae
- Clade: Tracheophytes
- Clade: Angiosperms
- Clade: Eudicots
- Clade: Asterids
- Order: Gentianales
- Family: Rubiaceae
- Genus: Cruciata
- Species: C. glabra

Binomial name
- Cruciata glabra (L.) Opiz

Synonyms
- List: Galium bauhini Roem. & Schult.; Valantia bauhini (Roem. & Schult.) Schur; Valantia glabra L.

= Cruciata glabra =

Species of flowering plant

Cruciata glabra, smooth crosswort, is a species of flowering plant in the family Rubiaceae, native to Morocco, Algeria, southern, central and eastern Europe, the Caucasus, Kazakhstan, the Altai, and western Siberia. It is often found in beech (Fagus sylvatica) forests.

== Subspecies ==
The following subspecies are currently accepted:

- Cruciata glabra subsp. balcanica (Ehrend.) Soó
- Cruciata glabra subsp. glabra
- Cruciata glabra subsp. hirticaulis (Beck) Natali & Jeanm.
- Cruciata glabra subsp. krylovii (Iljin) E.G.Naumova
