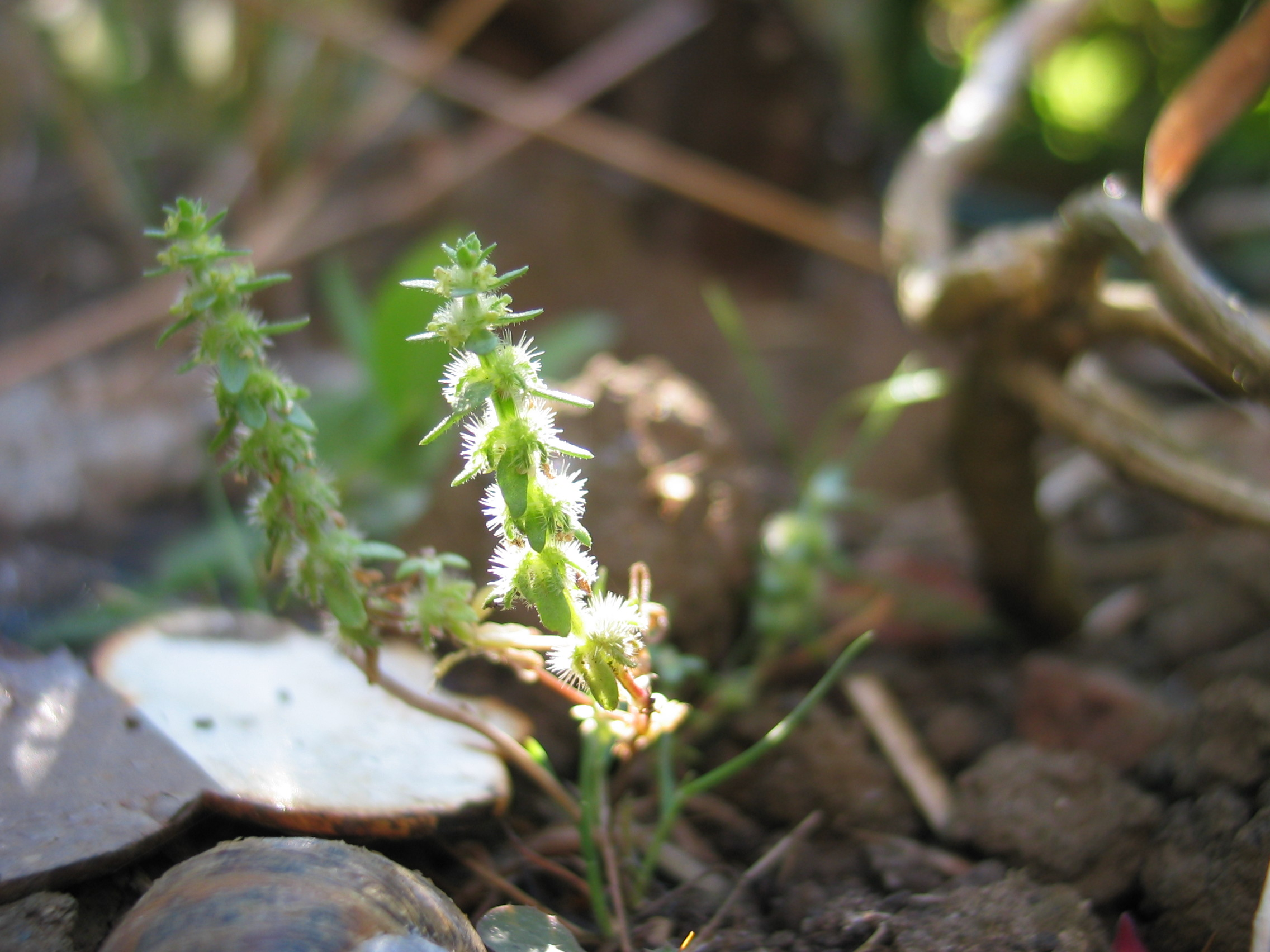

Scientific classification
- Kingdom: Plantae
- Clade: Tracheophytes
- Clade: Angiosperms
- Clade: Eudicots
- Clade: Asterids
- Order: Gentianales
- Family: Rubiaceae
- Genus: Valantia
- Species: V. hispida

Binomial name
- Valantia hispida L.

= Valantia hispida =

Species of plant

Valantia hispida is a species of annual herb in the family Rubiaceae. They have a self-supporting growth form and simple, broad leaves. Individuals can grow to 0.05 m.

== Sources ==
This article incorporates text from a free content work. Licensed under CC0 (license statement/permission). Text taken from Valantia hispida. Encyclopedia of Life.
