= Cruciata (disambiguation) =

Cruciata, a Latin adjective meaning crucified, may refer to:

- Cruciata, a plant genus
- Silvana Cruciata (born 1953), Italian middle- and long-distance runner

== See also ==
- Cruciatum
- Cruciatus
