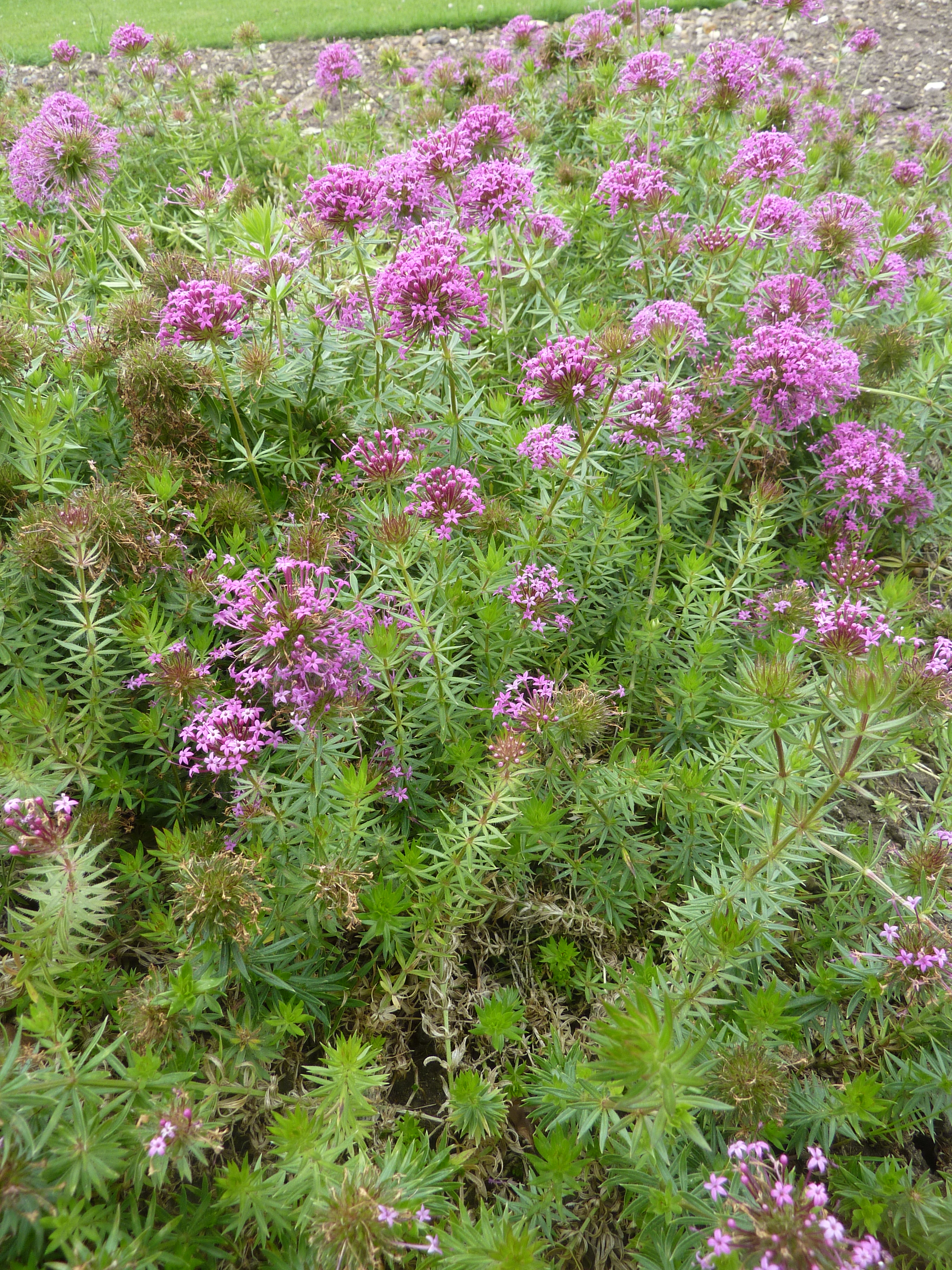

Scientific classification
- Kingdom: Plantae
- Clade: Tracheophytes
- Clade: Angiosperms
- Clade: Eudicots
- Clade: Asterids
- Order: Gentianales
- Family: Rubiaceae
- Subfamily: Rubioideae
- Tribe: Rubieae
- Genus: Phuopsis (Griseb.) Hook.f.

= Phuopsis =

Genus of plants

Phuopsis is a genus of flowering plants belonging to the family Rubiaceae.

Its native range is Caucasus to Northwestern Iran.

== Species ==
Species:

- Phuopsis stylosa (Trin.) G.Nicholson
