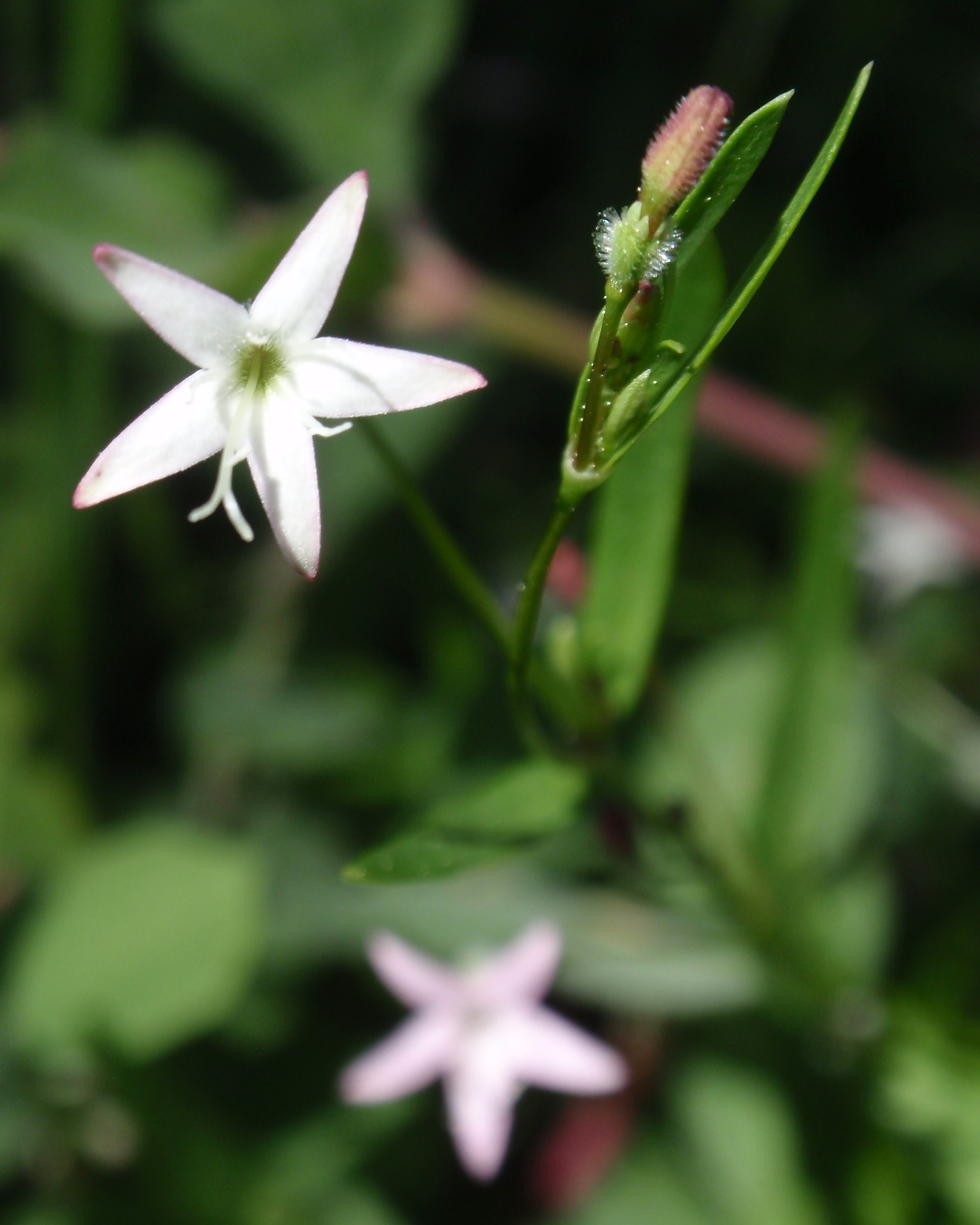

Scientific classification
- Kingdom: Plantae
- Clade: Tracheophytes
- Clade: Angiosperms
- Clade: Eudicots
- Clade: Asterids
- Order: Gentianales
- Family: Rubiaceae
- Genus: Kelloggia
- Species: K. galioides

Binomial name
- Kelloggia galioides Torr.

= Kelloggia galioides =

Species of plant

Kelloggia galioides is a species of flowering plant in the coffee family known by the common name milk kelloggia. It is a perennial herb that is native to the Western United States.

== Description ==
Kelloggia galioides is a rhizomatous perennial herb growing a very slender, erect stem to a maximum height near 40 centimeters. Lance-shaped green leaves are arranged oppositely on the stem, especially at axils where it branches. Each is 2 to 4 centimeters long.

A thin-branched open inflorescence produces a few small bright pink or white flowers. The flower is funnel-shaped with the rounded, hairy green fruit developing at its base. The flower has narrow, pointed lobes on its open face. Its bloom period is from May to August.

== Distribution and habitat ==
The plant is native to the Western United States from Washington to California, and New Mexico to Montana. It is grows in Yellow pine, Red fir, and Lodgepole pine coniferous forests, at 700–3,110 metres (2,300–10,200 ft) in elevation.
