= Galium geminiflorum =

Twinflowered bedstraw

Scientific classification
- Kingdom: Plantae
- Clade: Tracheophytes
- Clade: Angiosperms
- Clade: Eudicots
- Clade: Asterids
- Order: Gentianales
- Family: Rubiaceae
- Genus: Galium
- Species: G. geminiflorum

Binomial name
- Galium geminiflorum Lowe

Species of plant

Galium geminiflorum, the twinflowered bedstraw, is a plant species in the Rubiaceae, currently accepted as a distinct species. This 1838 name by Lowe should not be confused with the 1844 plant given the same name by Martens & Galeotti.

Galium geminiflorum Lowe is native to certain islands of the eastern North Atlantic: Madeira, the Canary Islands and Selvagens (Savage Islands)
