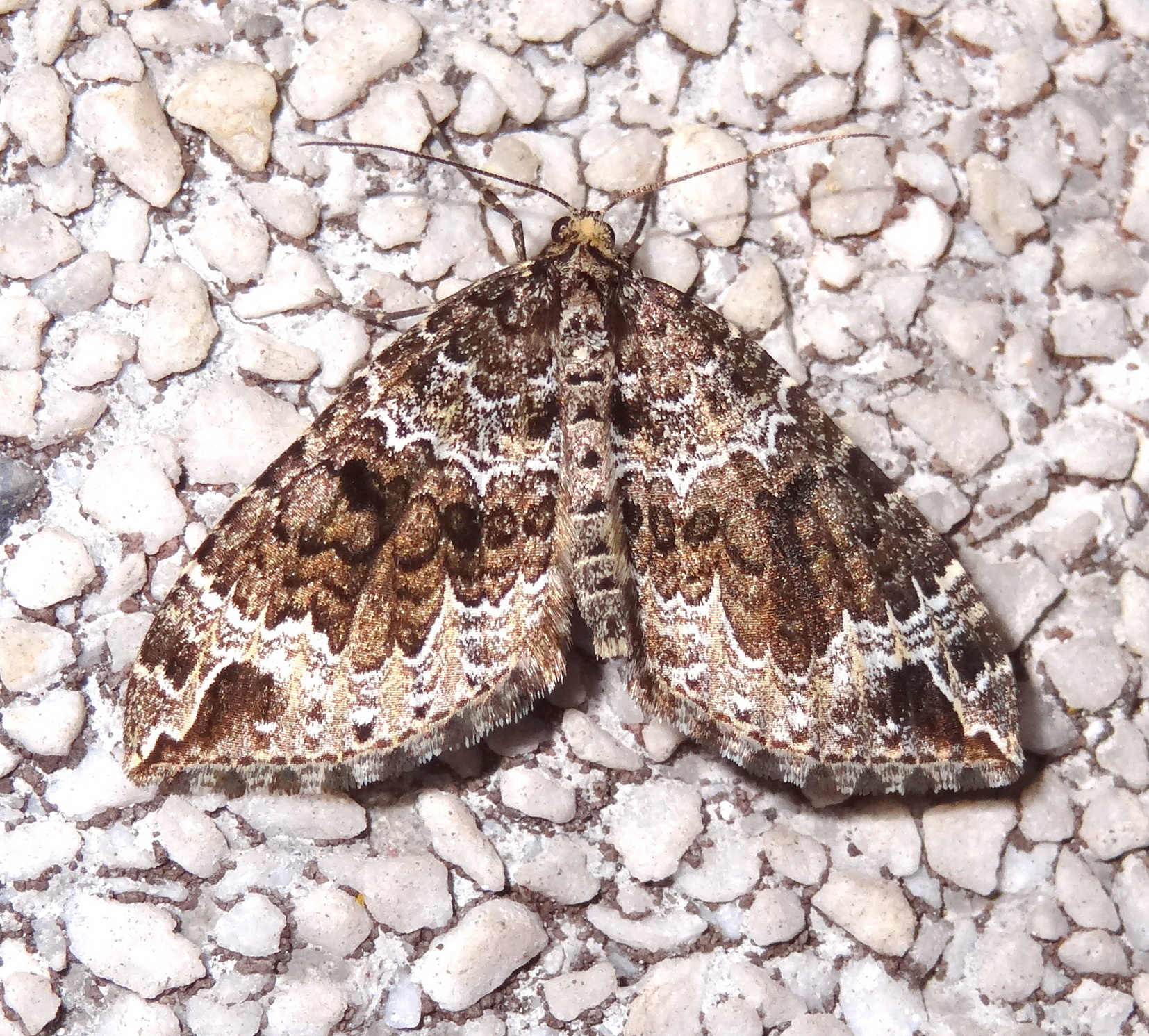

Scientific classification
- Kingdom: Animalia
- Phylum: Arthropoda
- Class: Insecta
- Order: Lepidoptera
- Family: Geometridae
- Genus: Lampropteryx
- Species: L. synthetica

Binomial name
- Lampropteryx synthetica Prout, 1922

= Lampropteryx synthetica =

Species of moth

Lampropteryx synthetica is a moth in the family Geometridae. It is found in Taiwan.

The wingspan is 26–36 mm.
