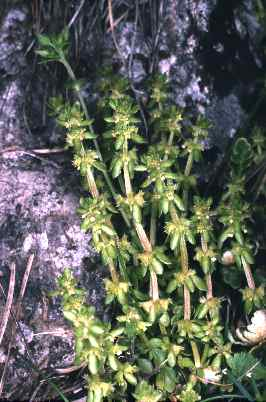
- Valantia deltoidea

Scientific classification
- Kingdom: Plantae
- Clade: Tracheophytes
- Clade: Angiosperms
- Clade: Eudicots
- Clade: Asterids
- Order: Gentianales
- Family: Rubiaceae
- Subfamily: Rubioideae
- Tribe: Rubieae
- Genus: Valantia; L.

Type species
- Valantia muralis L.

Synonyms
- Meionandra Gauba; Vaillantia Hoffm.

= Valantia =

Genus of plants

Valantia is a genus of flowering plants in the family Rubiaceae. The genus is found from Macaronesia to western Asia and northeastern tropical Africa.

== Species ==
- Valantia aprica (Sm.) Tausch
- Valantia calva Brullo
- Valantia columella (Ehrenb. ex Boiss.) Bald
- Valantia deltoidea Brullo
- Valantia hispida L.
- Valantia lainzii Devesa & Ortega Oliv.
- Valantia muralis L.
