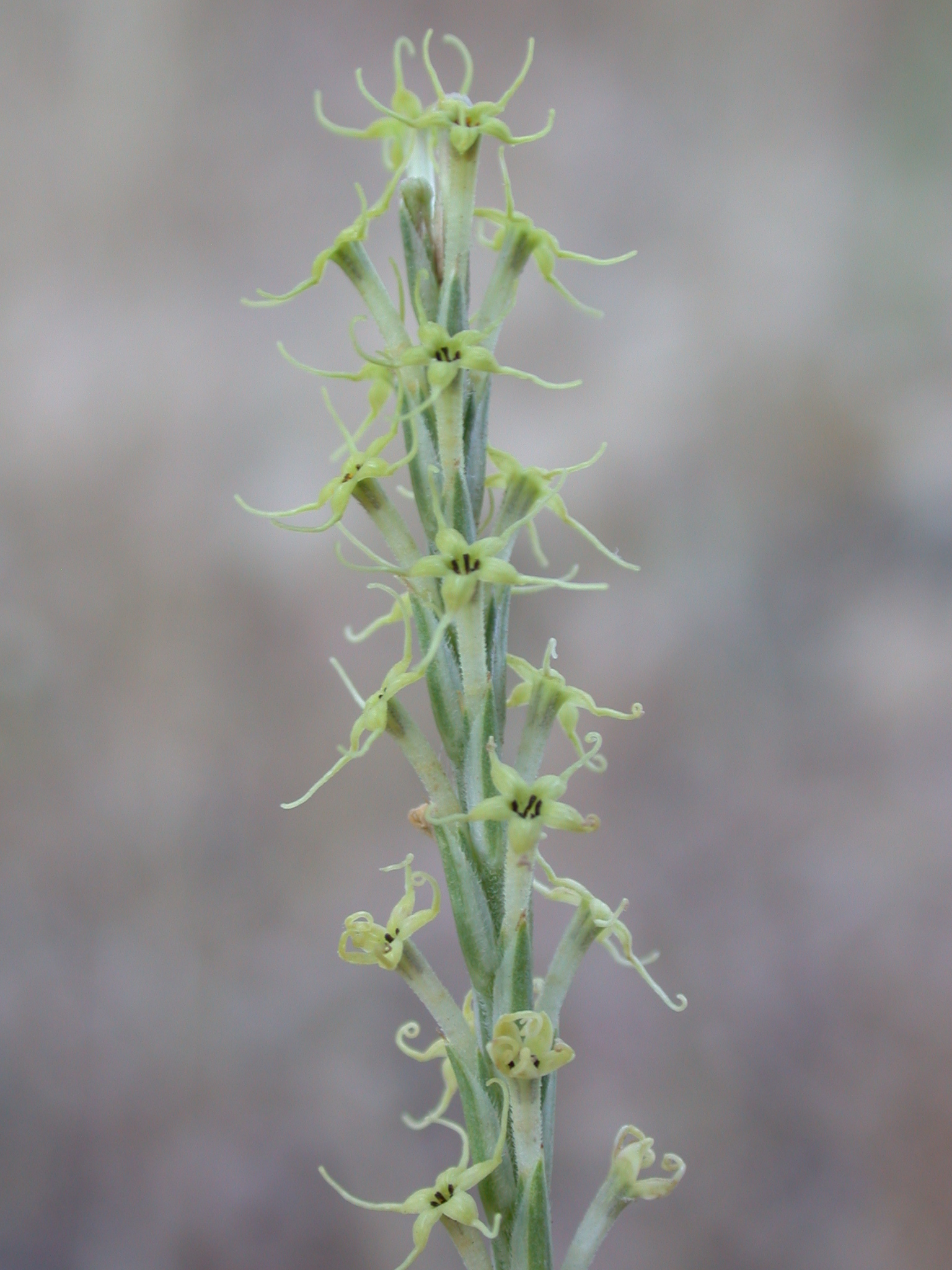
- Crucianella macrostachya

Scientific classification
- Kingdom: Plantae
- Clade: Embryophytes
- Clade: Tracheophytes
- Clade: Spermatophytes
- Clade: Angiosperms
- Clade: Eudicots
- Clade: Asterids
- Order: Gentianales
- Family: Rubiaceae
- Subfamily: Rubioideae
- Tribe: Rubieae
- Genus: Crucianella; L.

Type species
- Crucianella latifolia L.

Synonyms
- Mappia Hablitz ex Ledeb.; Rubeola Mill.

= Crucianella =

Crossworts

Genus of plants

Crucianella (common name crossworts) is a genus of flowering plants in the family Rubiaceae. The species are annual herbs found from the Mediterranean to Central Asia and the Arabian Peninsula. One species (C. angustifolia) is naturalized in northern California, southern Oregon (Josephine County), and Idaho (Clearwater County).

== Species ==
- Crucianella aegyptiaca L.
- Crucianella angustifolia L.
- Crucianella arabica Schönb.-Tem. & Ehrend.
- Crucianella baldschuanica Krasch.
- Crucianella bithynica Boiss.
- Crucianella bouarfae Andreonszkyu
- Crucianella bucharica B.Fedtsch.
- Crucianella chlorostachys Fisch. & C.A.Mey.
- Crucianella ciliata Lam.
- Crucianella disticha Boiss.
- Crucianella divaricata Korovin
- Crucianella exasperata Fisch. & C.A.Mey.
- Crucianella filifolia Regel & Schmalh.
- Crucianella gilanica Trin.
- Crucianella graeca Boiss.
- Crucianella hirta Pomel
- Crucianella imbricata Boiss.
- Crucianella kurdistanica Malin.
- Crucianella latifolia L.
- Crucianella macrostachya Boiss.
- Crucianella maritima L.
- Crucianella membranacea Boiss.
- Crucianella parviflora Ehrend.
- Crucianella patula L.
- Crucianella platyphylla Ehrend. & Schönb.-Tem.
- Crucianella sabulosa Korovin & Krasch.
- Crucianella schischkinii Lincz.
- Crucianella sintenisii Bornm.
- Crucianella sorgerae Ehrend.
- Crucianella suaveolens C.A.Mey.
- Crucianella transjordanica Rech.f.

== Image gallery ==
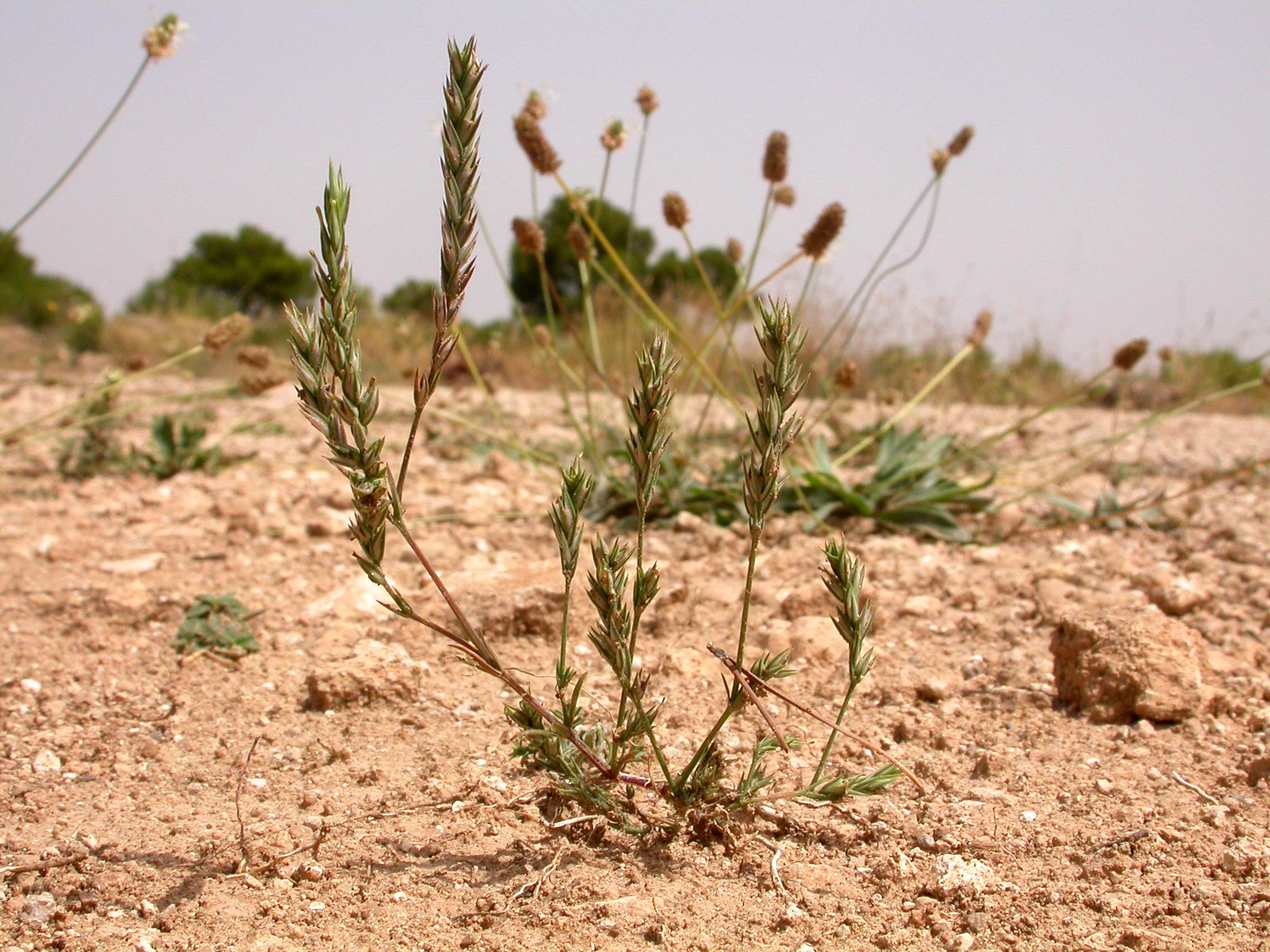
Crucianella angustifolia

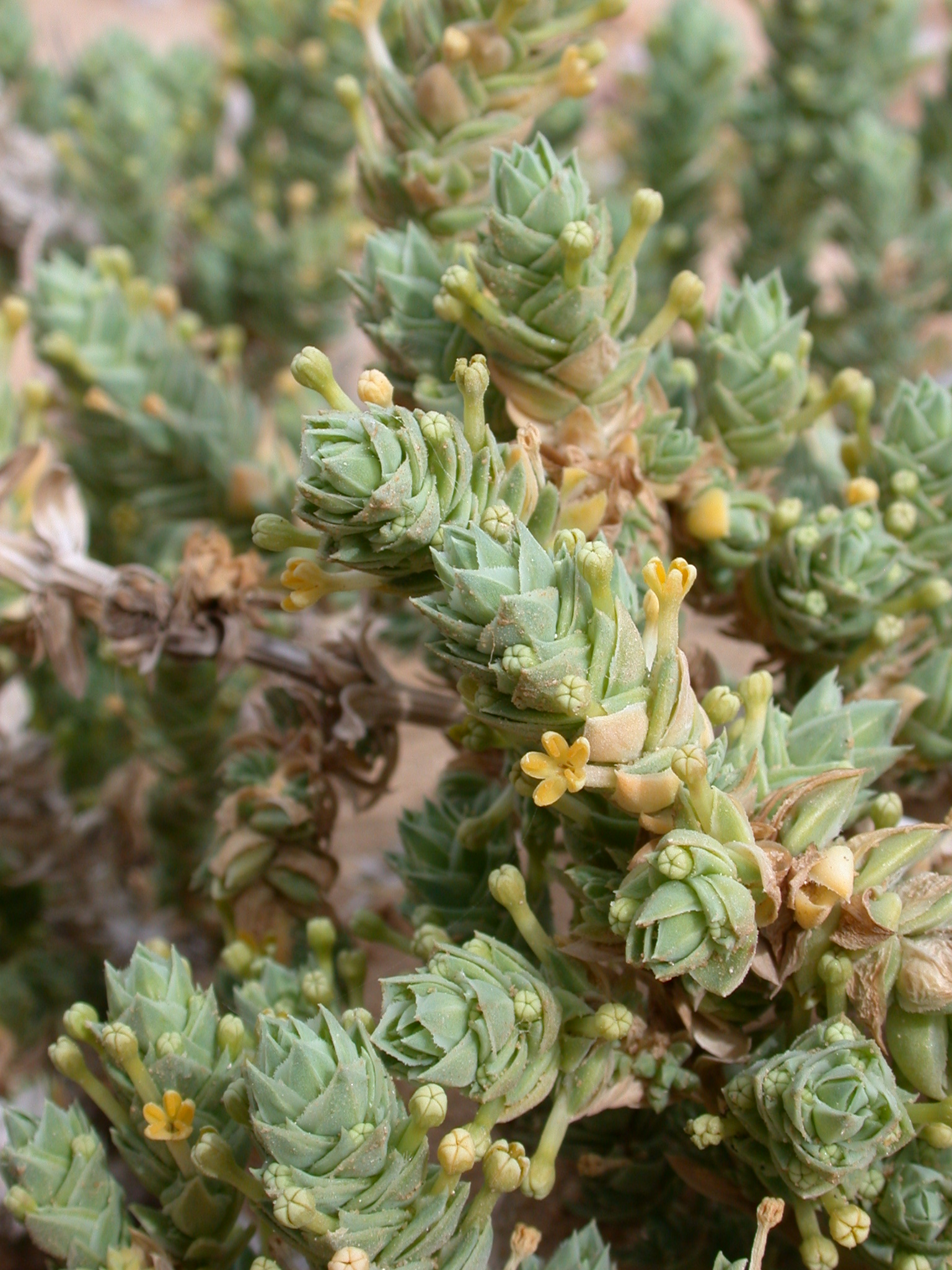
Crucianella maritima
