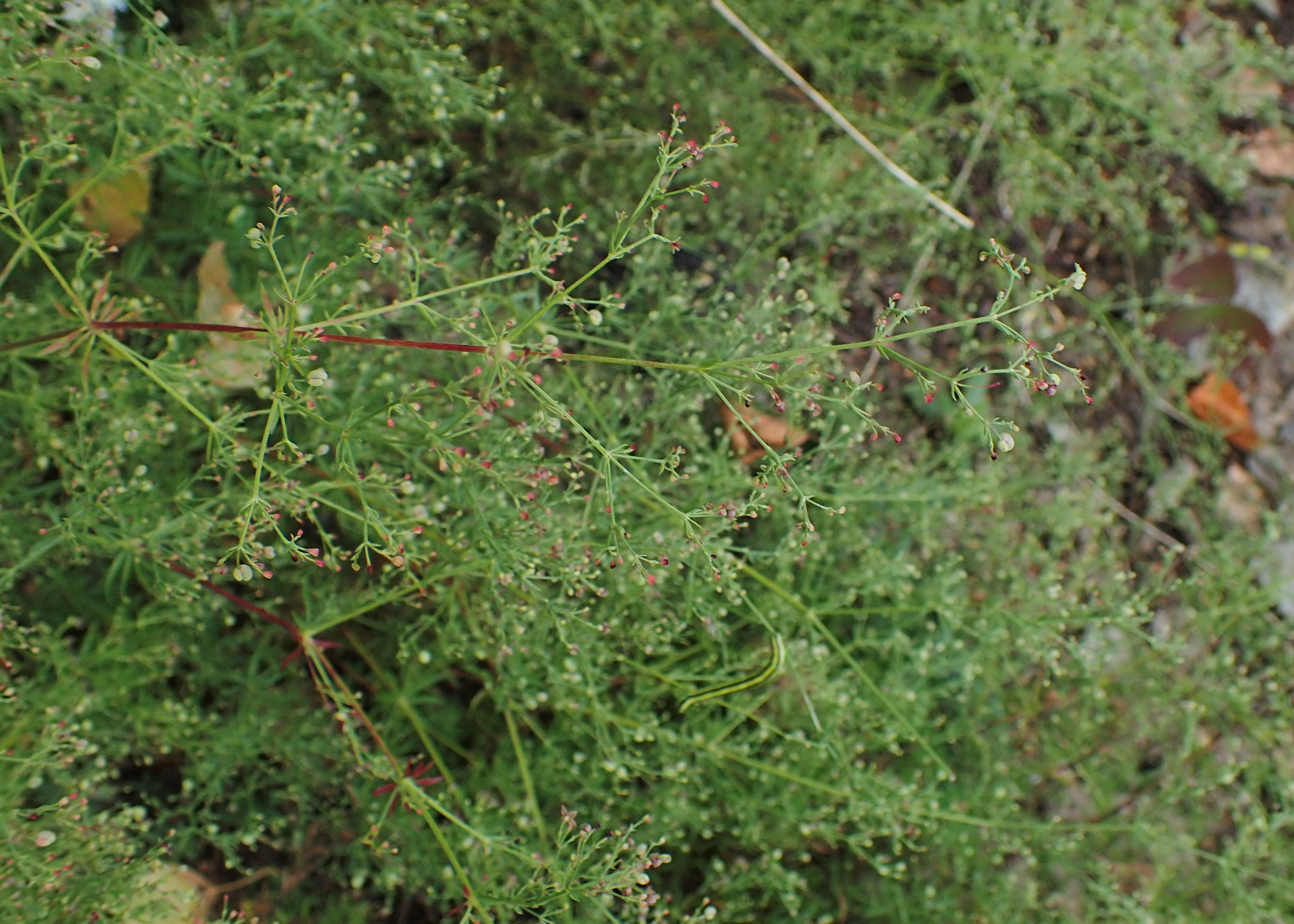

Scientific classification
- Kingdom: Plantae
- Clade: Tracheophytes
- Clade: Angiosperms
- Clade: Eudicots
- Clade: Asterids
- Order: Gentianales
- Family: Rubiaceae
- Genus: Asperula
- Species: A. purpurea

Binomial name
- Asperula purpurea (L.) Ehrend.

= Asperula purpurea =

Species of plant

Asperula purpurea is a species of flowering plant in the family Rubiaceae. It was first described in 1974 and is native to France, Switzerland, Italy, Austria, Slovenia, Serbia, Bosnia and Herzegovina, Montenegro, Croatia, Romania, Albania, Greece, and Turkey.
