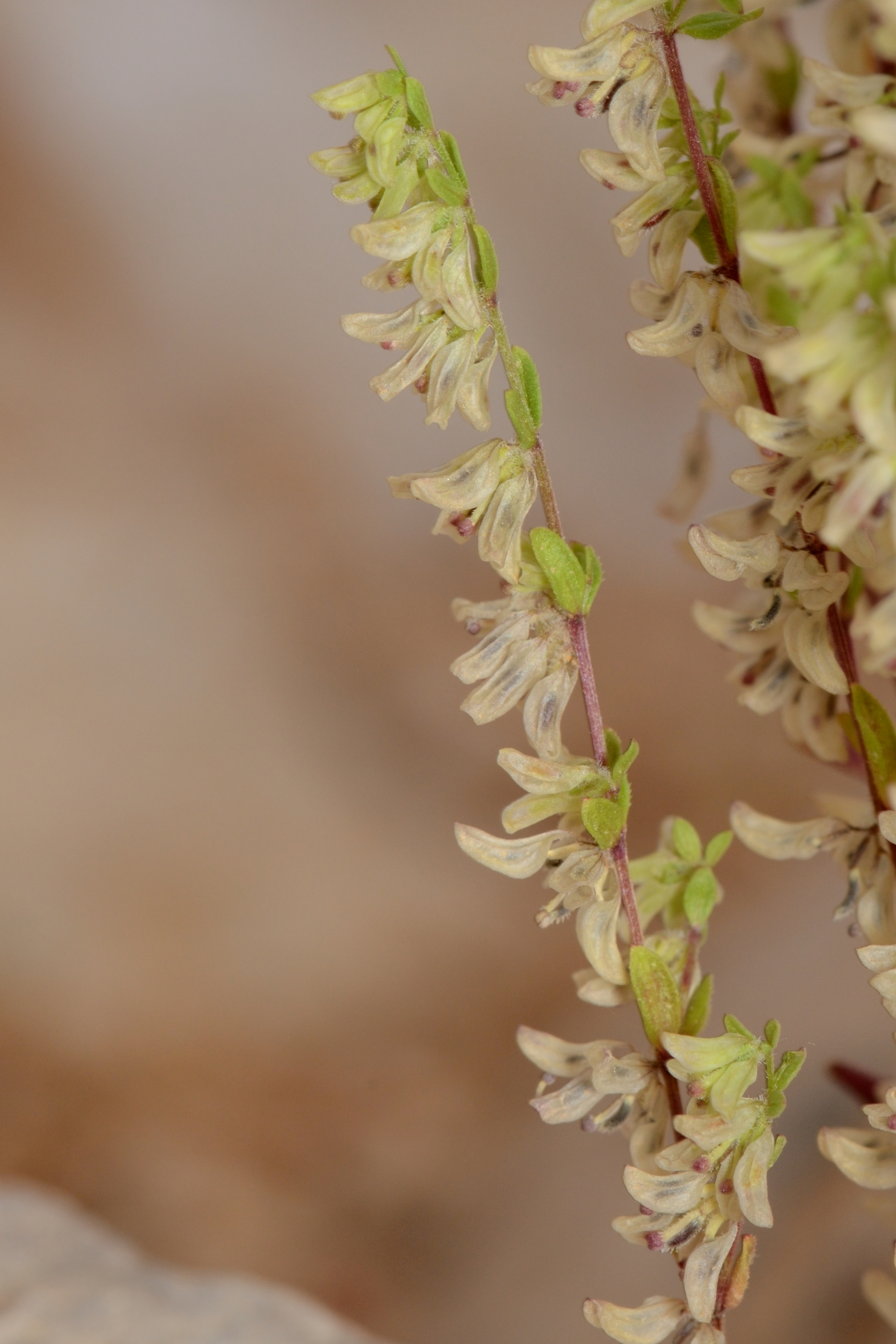

Scientific classification
- Kingdom: Plantae
- Clade: Tracheophytes
- Clade: Angiosperms
- Clade: Eudicots
- Clade: Asterids
- Order: Gentianales
- Family: Rubiaceae
- Subfamily: Rubioideae
- Tribe: Rubieae
- Genus: Callipeltis; Steven

Synonyms
- Cucullaria Kuntze; Warburgina Eig

= Callipeltis =

Species of plant

Callipeltis is a genus of flowering plants in the family Rubiaceae. It was originally described in 1829. The genus is found in Spain, North Africa, the Middle East, the Arabian Peninsula, and Central Asia as far east as Pakistan and Kazakhstan.

== Species ==
- Callipeltis cucullaris (L.) DC. - Spain, Morocco, Algeria, Egypt, Palestine, Turkey, Syria, Lebanon, Iran, Iraq, Israel, Kazakhstan, Turkmenistan, Kyrgyzstan, Uzbekistan, Tajikistan, Armenia, Azerbaijan, Georgia, Oman, Saudi Arabia, Pakistan and the sheikdoms of the Persian Gulf.
- Callipeltis factorovskyi (Eig) Ehrend. - Iraq, Syria, Lebanon, Palestine
- Callipeltis microstegia Boiss. - Iran, Iraq
