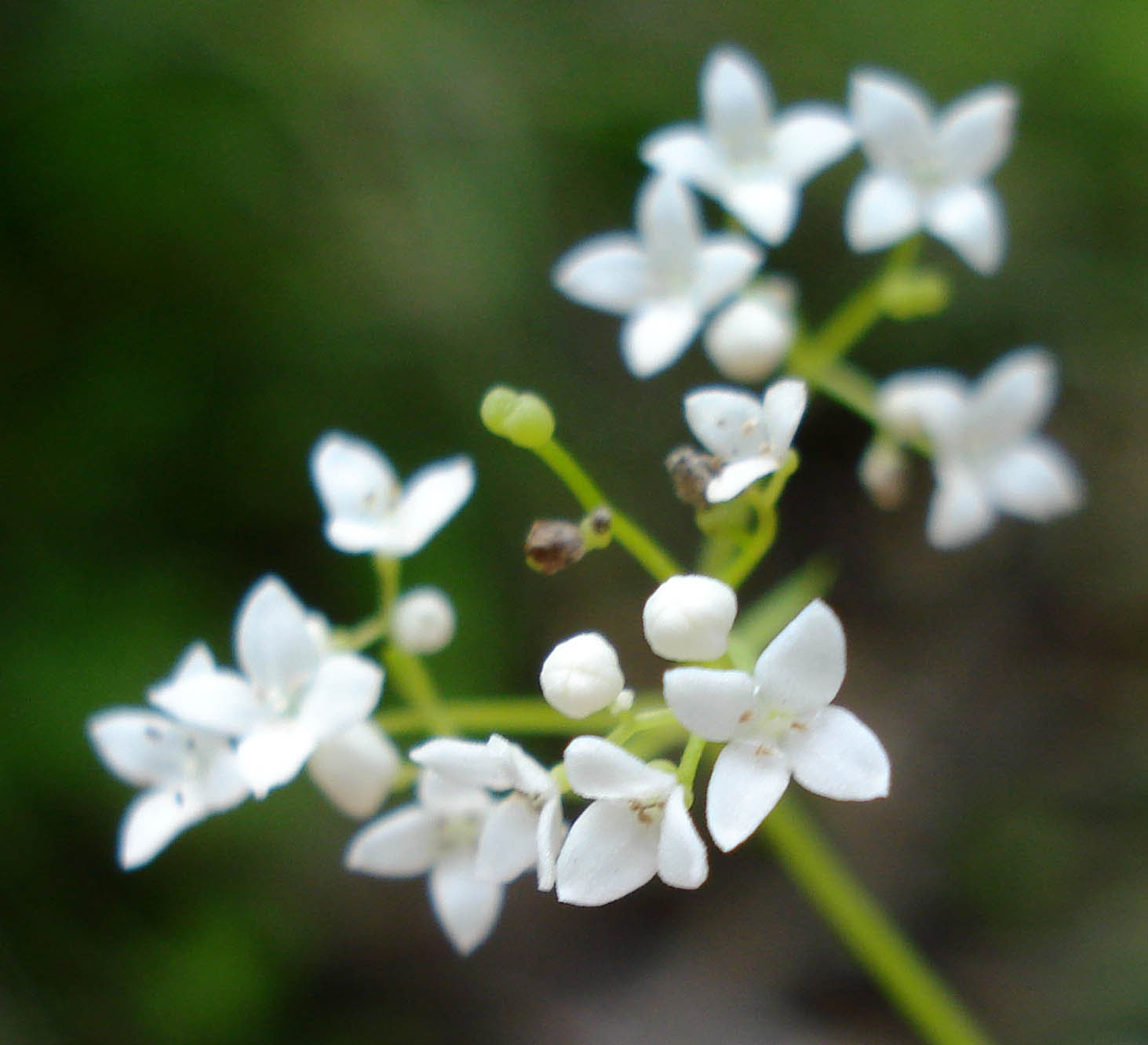
- Galium uliginosum

Scientific classification
- Kingdom: Plantae
- Clade: Tracheophytes
- Clade: Angiosperms
- Clade: Eudicots
- Clade: Asterids
- Order: Gentianales
- Family: Rubiaceae
- Subfamily: Rubioideae
- Tribe: Rubieae; Baill.

= Rubieae =

Tribe of plants

Rubieae is a tribe of flowering plants in the family Rubiaceae and contains 970 species in 15 genera. The genus Galium is responsible for more than two thirds of the species in the tribe. The second largest genus is Asperula, which contains about 200 species. Unlike the rest of the family Rubiaceae, the tribe contains predominantly perennial and annual herbs with pseudowhorls of leaves and leaflike stipules and is centered in temperate and tropical-mountain regions.

== Genera ==
Currently accepted names

- Asperula L. (191 sp)
- Callipeltis Steven (3 sp)
- Crucianella L. (31 sp)
- Cruciata Mill. (8 sp)
- Didymaea Hook.f. (8 sp)
- × Galiasperula Ronniger (1 sp)
- Galium L. (631 sp)
- Kelloggia Torr. ex Benth. & Hook.f. (2 sp)
- Mericarpaea Boiss. (1 sp)
- Microphysa Schrenk (1 sp)
- Phuopsis Steven (1 sp)
- Pseudogalium L.E Yang, Z.L.Nie & H.Sun (1 sp)
- Rubia L. (83 sp)
- Sherardia L. (1 sp)
- Valantia L. (7 sp)

Synonyms

- × Asperugalium P.Fourn. = × Galiasperula
- Relbunium (Endl.) Hook.f. = Galium
- Warburgina Eig = Callipeltis
