= Callipelis =

Scientific classification
- Kingdom: Animalia
- Phylum: Arthropoda
- Subphylum: Chelicerata
- Class: Arachnida
- Order: Araneae
- Infraorder: Araneomorphae
- Family: Gnaphosidae
- Genus: Callipelis; Zamani & Marusik, 2017
- Species: C. deserticola

Binomial name
- Callipelis deserticola Zamani & Marusik, 2017

Genus of spiders

Callipelis is a genus of ground spiders containing the single species, Callipelis deserticola. It was first described by Alireza Zamani & Yuri M. Marusik in 2017, and is only found in Iran.
