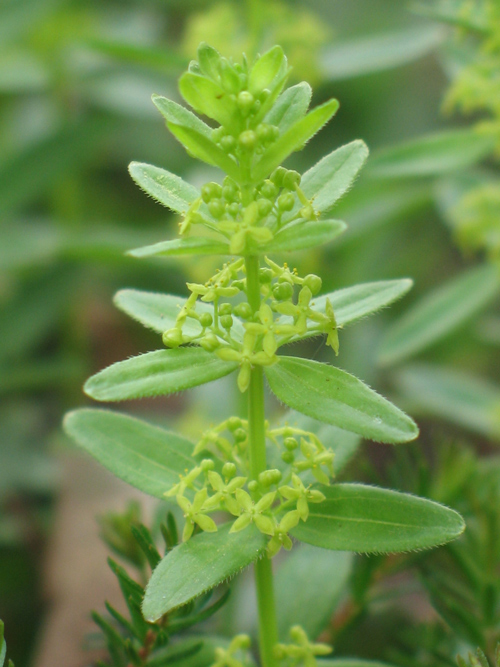
- Cruciata glabra

Scientific classification
- Kingdom: Plantae
- Clade: Tracheophytes
- Clade: Angiosperms
- Clade: Eudicots
- Clade: Asterids
- Order: Gentianales
- Family: Rubiaceae
- Subfamily: Rubioideae
- Tribe: Rubieae
- Genus: Cruciata; Mill.

= Cruciata =

Genus of plants

Cruciata is a genus of flowering plants belonging to the Rubiaceae family. It is found in Europe, northern Africa, and across southern and central Asia from Turkey to the western Himalaya and north to the Altay region of Siberia.

== Species ==
- Cruciata articulata (L.) Ehrend - Middle-East from Egypt and Turkey to Caucasus and Iran; also Crimea
- Cruciata elbrussica (Pobed.) Pobed. - Caucasus
- Cruciata glabra (L.) Opiz - Southern Europe from Portugal to Russia; also Algeria, Morocco, the Caucasus and the Altay region of Siberia
- Cruciata x grecescui (Prodan) Soo - C. glabra × C. laevipes- Romania
- Cruciata laevipes Opiz - Europe from Britain and Portugal to Russia; also Iran, Turkey, Caucasus and the Western Himalayas
- Cruciata mixta Ehrend. & Schönb.-Tem. - Turkey
- Cruciata pedemontana (Bellardi) Ehrend. - Central and southern Europe, Morocco; also the Middle East from Palestine and Turkey to Afghanistan
- Cruciata taurica (Pall. ex Willd.) Ehrend. - from Greece and Palestine east to Turkmenistan
- Cruciata valentinae (Galushko) Galushko - Transcaucasus
