= Microphysa =

Scientific classification
- Kingdom: Plantae
- Clade: Tracheophytes
- Clade: Angiosperms
- Clade: Eudicots
- Clade: Asterids
- Order: Gentianales
- Family: Rubiaceae
- Subfamily: Rubioideae
- Tribe: Rubieae
- Genus: Microphysa; Schrenk (1844)
- Species: M. elongata

Binomial name
- Microphysa elongata (Schrenk) Pobed. (1958)

Synonyms
- Asperula elongata Schrenk ex Fisch. & C.A.Mey. (1841); Microphysa galioides Schrenk (1844)

Genus of plants

Microphysa elongata is a species of flowering plant in family Rubiaceae. It is a perennial native to Kazakhstan, Kyrgyzstan, Uzbekistan, and Xinjiang in Central Asia. It is the sole species in genus Microphysa.
