= Paralophia quadrinodosa =

Scientific classification
- Kingdom: Animalia
- Phylum: Arthropoda
- Class: Insecta
- Order: Coleoptera
- Suborder: Polyphaga
- Infraorder: Cucujiformia
- Family: Cerambycidae
- Subfamily: Lamiinae
- Tribe: Pteropliini
- Genus: Paralophia; Aurivillius, 1924
- Species: P. quadrinodosa

Binomial name
- Paralophia quadrinodosa Aurivillius, 1924

Species of beetle

Paralophia is a monotypic beetle genus in the family Cerambycidae described by Per Olof Christopher Aurivillius in 1924. Its single species, Paralophia quadrinodosa, was described by the same author in the same year.
