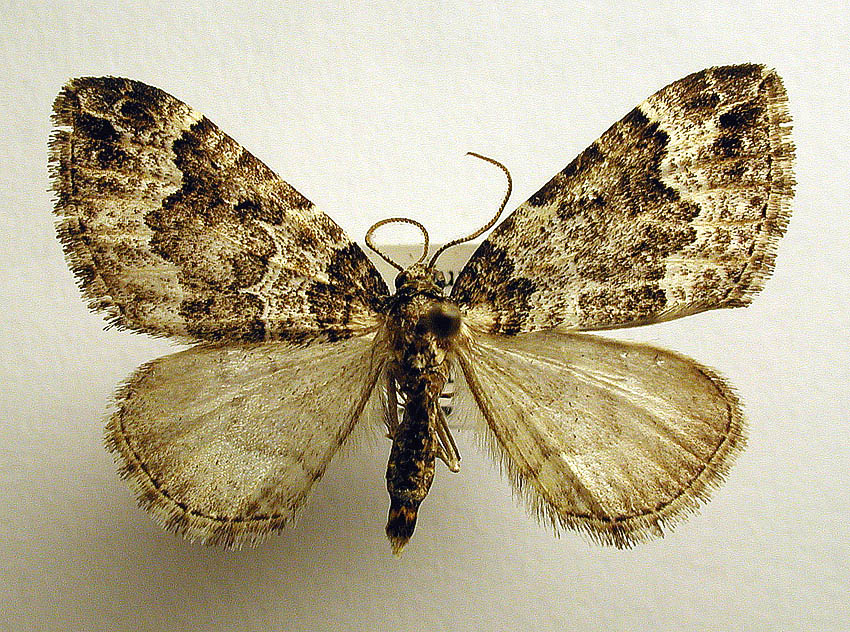
- Water carpet (Lampropteryx suffumata)

Scientific classification
- Kingdom: Animalia
- Phylum: Arthropoda
- Clade: Pancrustacea
- Class: Insecta
- Order: Lepidoptera
- Family: Geometridae
- Subfamily: Larentiinae
- Tribe: Cidariini
- Genus: Lampropteryx; Stephens, 1831

Type species
- Geometra suffumata Denis & Schiffermüller, 1775

Synonyms
- Anisobole Warren, 1902; Paracomucha Warren, 1904; Paralophia Warren, 1893

= Lampropteryx =

Genus of moths

Lampropteryx is a genus of moths in the family Geometridae and was raised by the English entomologist, James Francis Stephens in 1831. The name is from the Greek (lampros, a wing) and (pteryx, bright); referring to the ″strong gloss on the forewings …″.

== Species ==
- Lampropteryx albigirata (Kollar, 1848)
- Lampropteryx argentilineata (Leech, 1897)
- Lampropteryx chalybearia (Moore, 1868)
- Lampropteryx jameza (Butler, 1878)
- Lampropteryx minna (Butler, 1881)
- Lampropteryx nishizawai Sato, 1990
- Lampropteryx otregiata (Metcalfe, 1917) – Devon carpet
- Lampropteryx suffumata (Denis & Schiffermüller, 1775) – water carpet
- Lampropteryx synthetica Prout, 1922
