= Cruciata laevipes =

crosswort smooth bedstraw

Scientific classification
- Kingdom: Plantae
- Clade: Tracheophytes
- Clade: Angiosperms
- Clade: Eudicots
- Clade: Asterids
- Order: Gentianales
- Family: Rubiaceae
- Genus: Cruciata
- Species: C. laevipes

Binomial name
- Cruciata laevipes Opiz

Synonyms
- Valantia cruciata L.; Galium cruciata (L.) Scop.; Galium cruciata var. laevipes (Opiz) W.D.J.Koch; Rubia cruciata (L.) Baill.; Valantia hirsuta Gilib.; Aparine latifolia Moench; Galium valantia G.Gaertn., B.Mey. & Scherb.; Valantia ciliata Opiz ex J.Presl & C.Presl; Galium glabrifolium Rochel; Galium cruciata var. mucronata Peterm.; Cruciata ciliata Opiz; Cruciata hirsuta Fourr.; Galium luteocruciatum St.-Lag.; Valantia crucialis Bubani

Species of plant

Cruciata laevipes is a species of flowering plant in the family Rubiaceae. It is commonly known as crosswort, smooth bedstraw or Luc na croise in Gaelic. The Latin epithet laevipes refers to the smooth stalk.

The common name crosswort is a 16th century translation of the botanists' Latin cruciata planta, meaning "cross plant", i.e., with leaves in a cross-like arrangement.

== Description ==
This perennial sprawling plant can grow to a height of 15–70 cm (6–28 in), spreads by seeds and stolons and has, unusually amongst this group, yellow hermaphrodite flowers. The inner flowers are male and soon fall off, whilst the outer are bisexual and produce the fruit. The flowers smell of honey. Of the whorls of four leaves, only two in each group are real leaves, the other two being stipules. It is associated with arbuscular mycorrhiza that penetrate the cortical cells of the roots. In the United Kingdom it flowers April to June. Pollination is by bees and flies.

== Distribution and habitat ==
Cruciata laevipes is found in most of Europe as well as from northern Turkey, Iran, the Caucasus, and the western Himalayas. It is also reportedly naturalized in Ontario County in New York State. Cruciata laevipes is found in meadows, road verges, riverbanks, scrub and open woodland, generally on well-drained calcareous soils.

== Uses ==
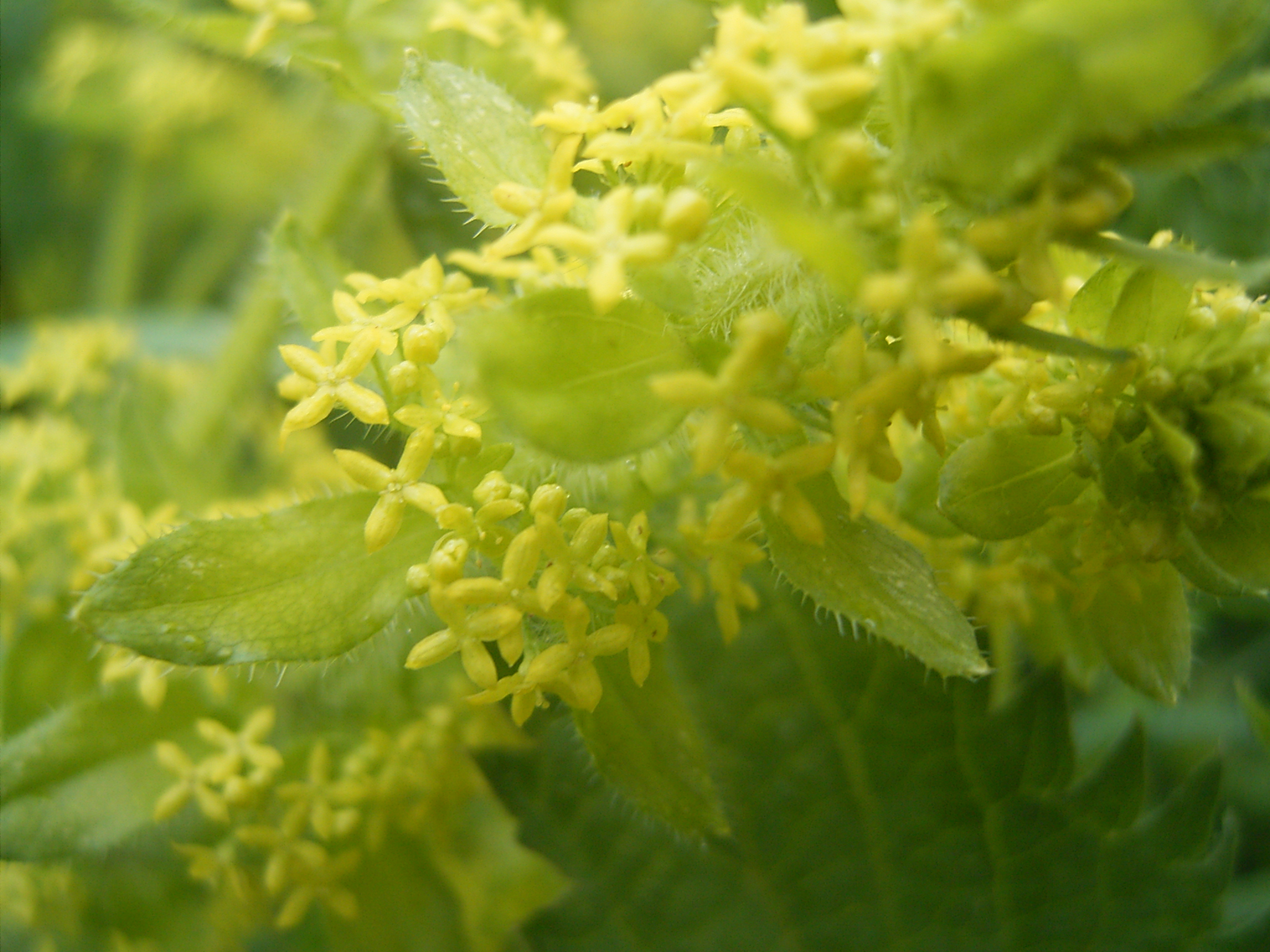
C. laevipes flowers

Cruciata laevipes is little used in herbal medicine today, but it was once recommended as a remedy for rupture, rheumatism and dropsy. Bald's Leechbook recommended crosswort as a cure for headaches.
