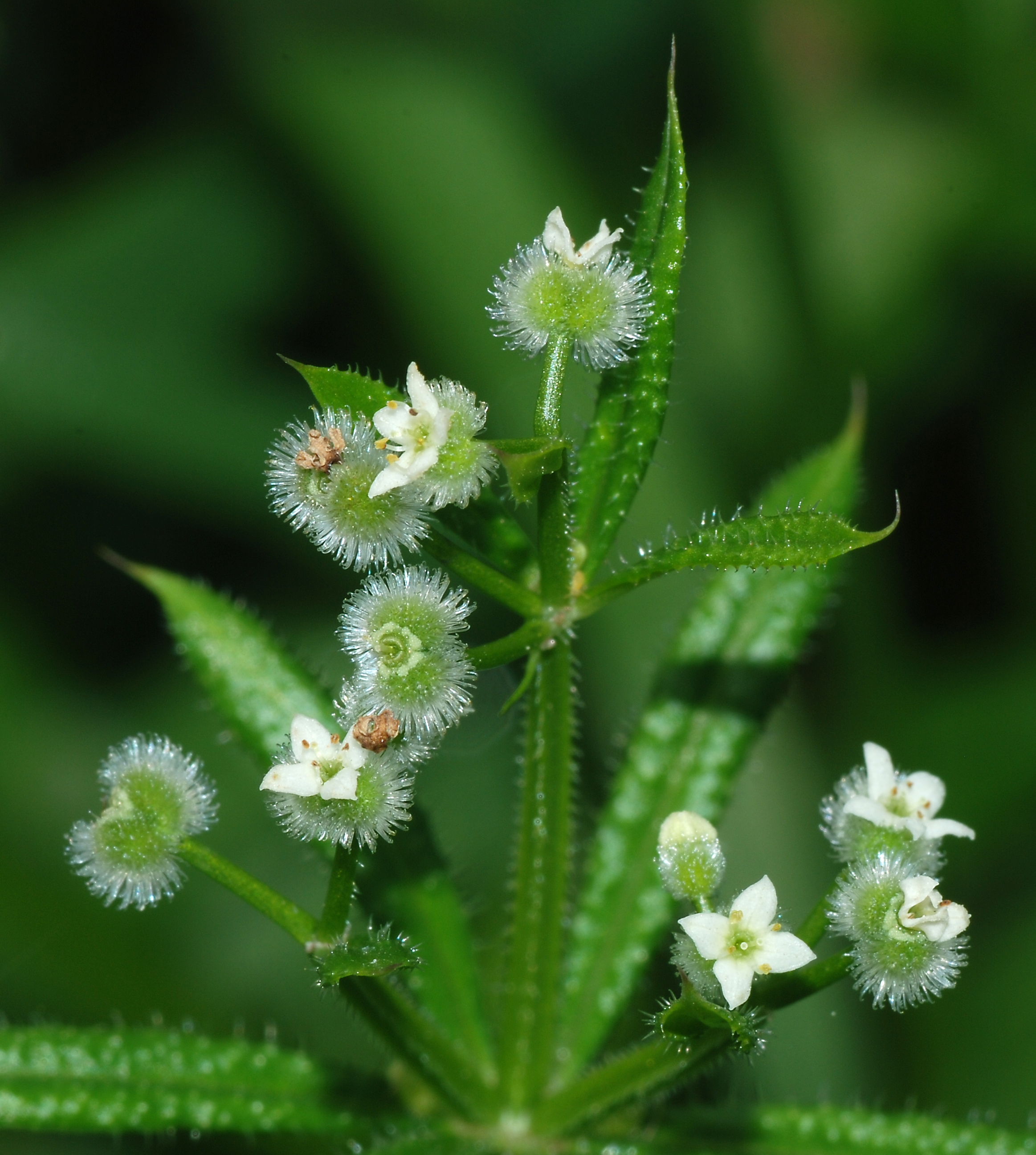
- Flowers of Galium aparine

Scientific classification
- Kingdom: Plantae
- Clade: Tracheophytes
- Clade: Angiosperms
- Clade: Eudicots
- Clade: Asterids
- Order: Gentianales
- Family: Rubiaceae
- Subfamily: Rubioideae
- Tribe: Rubieae
- Genus: Galium; L.

Diversity
- c. 650, see text

= Galium =

Genus of plants

Galium is a large genus of annual and perennial herbaceous plants in the family Rubiaceae, occurring in the temperate zones of both the Northern and Southern Hemispheres. Some species are informally known as bedstraw.

Over 600 species of Galium are described, with estimates of 629 to 650 as of 2013. The field madder, Sherardia arvensis, is a close relative and may be confused with a tiny bedstraw. Asperula is also a closely related genus; some species of Galium (such as woodruff, G. odoratum) are occasionally placed therein.

== See also ==
- List of Galium species
