= French Republican calendar =

Calendar used in Revolutionary France from 1793 to 1805

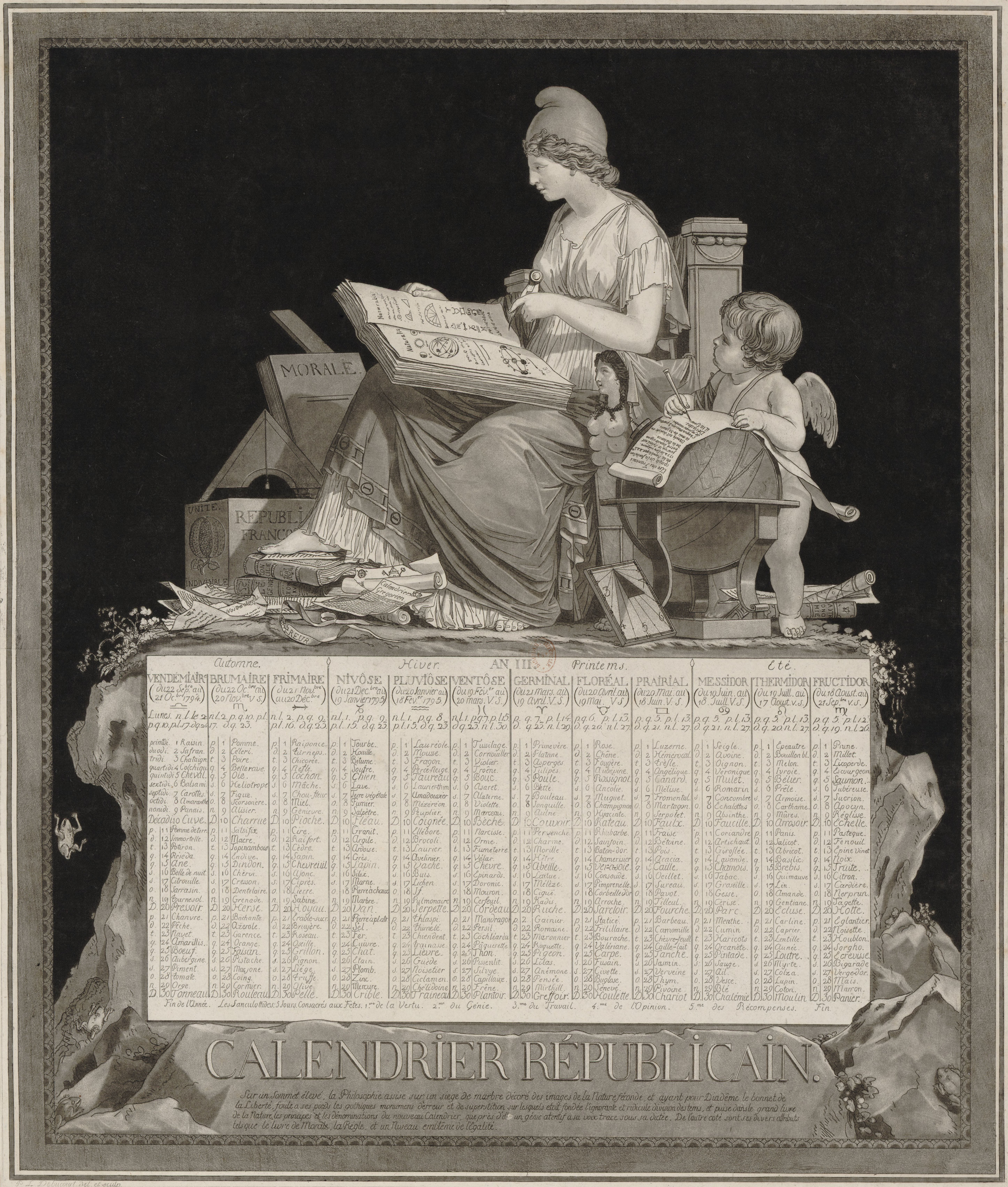
French Republican Calendar of An III (1794 to 1795), drawn by Philibert-Louis Debucourt

The French Republican calendar (French: calendrier républicain français), also commonly called the French Revolutionary calendar (calendrier révolutionnaire français), was a calendar created and implemented during the French Revolution and used by the French government for about 12 years from late 1793 to 1805, and for 18 days by the Paris Commune in 1871, meant to replace the Gregorian calendar.

The calendar consisted of twelve 30-day months, each divided into three 10-day cycles similar to weeks, plus five or six intercalary days at the end to fill out the balance of a solar year. It was designed in part to remove all religious and royalist influences from the calendar, and it was part of a larger attempt at dechristianisation and decimalisation in France (which also included decimal time of day, decimalisation of currency, and metrication). It was used in government records in France and other areas under French rule, including Belgium, Luxembourg, and parts of the Netherlands, Germany, Switzerland, Malta, and Italy.

== History ==
The National Constituent Assembly at first intended to create a new calendar marking the "era of Liberty", beginning on 14 July 1789, the date of the storming of the Bastille. However, on 2 January 1792 its successor the Legislative Assembly decided that Year IV of Liberty had begun the day before. Year II had therefore begun on 1 January 1790.

On 21 September 1792 the French First Republic was proclaimed, and the new National Convention decided that 1792 was to be known as Year I of the French Republic. It decreed on 2 January 1793 that Year II of the Republic had begun the day before. However, the new calendar as adopted by the Convention in October 1793 made 22 September 1792 the first day of Year I. The Common Era, commemorating the birth of Jesus Christ, was abolished and replaced with l'ère républicaine, the Republican Era, signifying the "age of reason" overcoming superstition, as part of the campaign of dechristianisation.

The calendar is frequently named the "French Revolutionary Calendar" because it was created during the revolution, but this is a slight misnomer. In France, it is known as the calendrier républicain as well as the calendrier révolutionnaire. There was initially a debate as to whether the calendar should celebrate the revolution, which began in July 1789, or the Republic, which was established in 1792. Immediately following 14 July 1789, papers and pamphlets started calling 1789 year I of Liberty and the following years II and III. It was in 1792, with the practical problem of dating financial transactions, that the legislative assembly was confronted with the problem of the calendar. Originally, the choice of epoch was either 1 January 1789 or 14 July 1789.

After some hesitation the assembly decided on 2 January 1792 that all official documents would use the "era of Liberty" and that the year IV of Liberty started on 1 January 1792. This usage was modified on 22 September 1792 when the Republic was proclaimed and the Convention decided that all public documents would be dated Year I of the French Republic. The decree of 2 January 1793 stipulated that the year II of the Republic began on 1 January 1793; this was revoked with the introduction of the calendar, which set 22 September 1793 as the beginning of year II. The establishment of the Republic was used as the epochal date for the calendar; therefore, the calendar commemorates the Republic, and not the Revolution.

The Concordat of 1801 re-established the Roman Catholic Church as an official institution in France, although not as the state religion of France. The concordat took effect from Easter Sunday, 28 Germinal, Year X (18 April 1802); it restored the names of the days of the week to the ones from the Gregorian calendar, and fixed Sunday as the official day of rest and religious celebration. However, the other attributes of the republican calendar, the months, and years, remained as they were.

The First Republic ended with the coronation of Napoleon I as emperor on 11 Frimaire, Year XIII, or 2 December 1804. Despite this, the republican calendar continued to be used until 1 January 1806, when Napoleon declared it abolished. It was used again briefly in the Journal officiel for some dates during a short period of the Paris Commune, 6–23 May 1871 (16 Floréal – 3 Prairial Year LXXIX).

== Overview and origins ==
=== Precursor ===
The prominent atheist essayist and philosopher Sylvain Maréchal published the first edition of his Almanach des Honnêtes-gens (Almanac of Honest People) in 1788. The first month in the almanac is "Mars, ou Princeps" (March, or First), the last month is "Février, ou Duodécembre" (February, or Twelfth). The lengths of the months are the same as those in the Gregorian calendar; however, the 10th, 20th, and 30th days are singled out of each month as the end of a décade (group of ten days). Individual days were assigned, instead of to the traditional saints, to people noteworthy for mostly secular achievements. Later editions of the almanac would switch to the Republican Calendar.

=== Development and usage ===
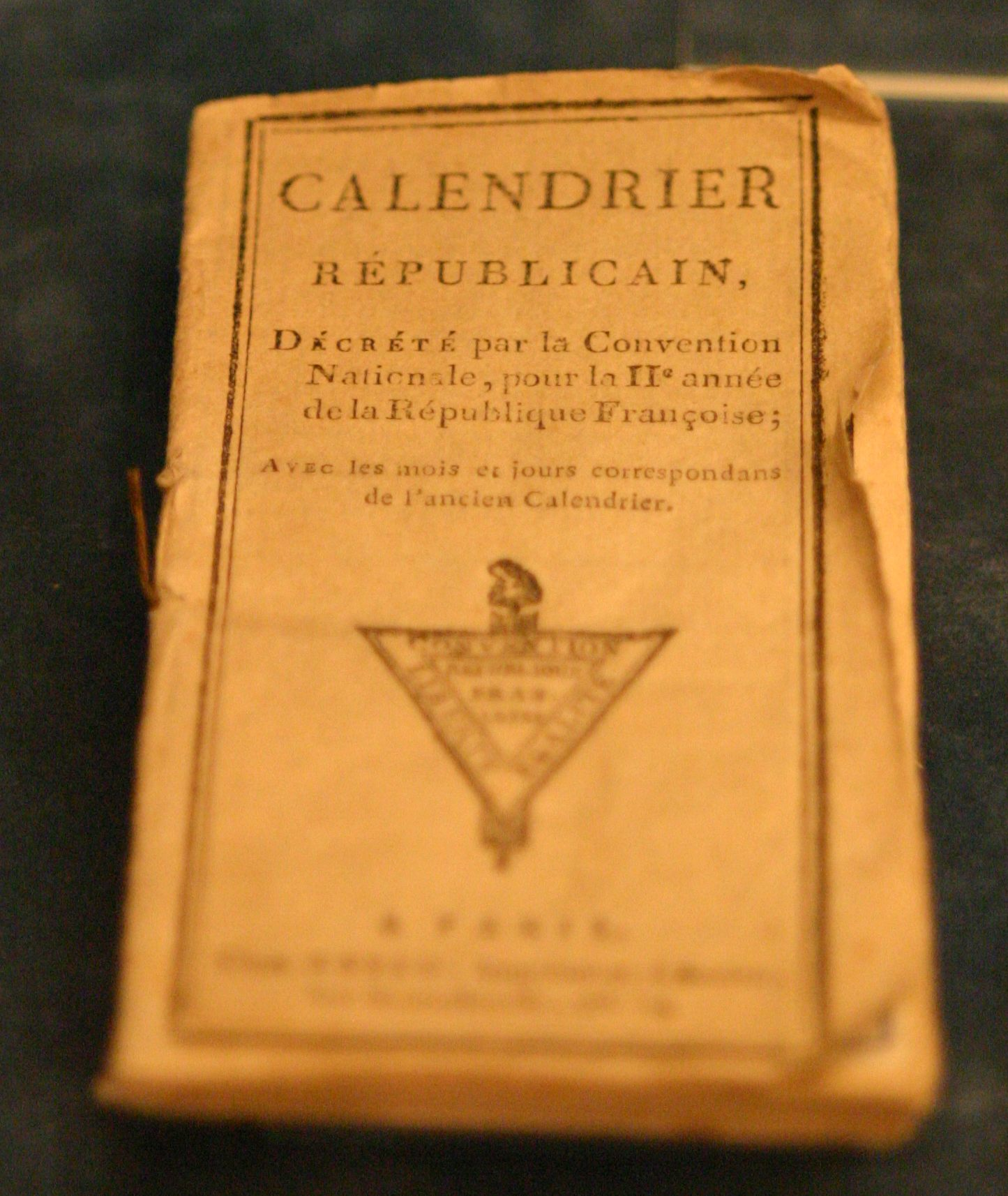
A copy of the French Republican Calendar in the Historical Museum of Lausanne

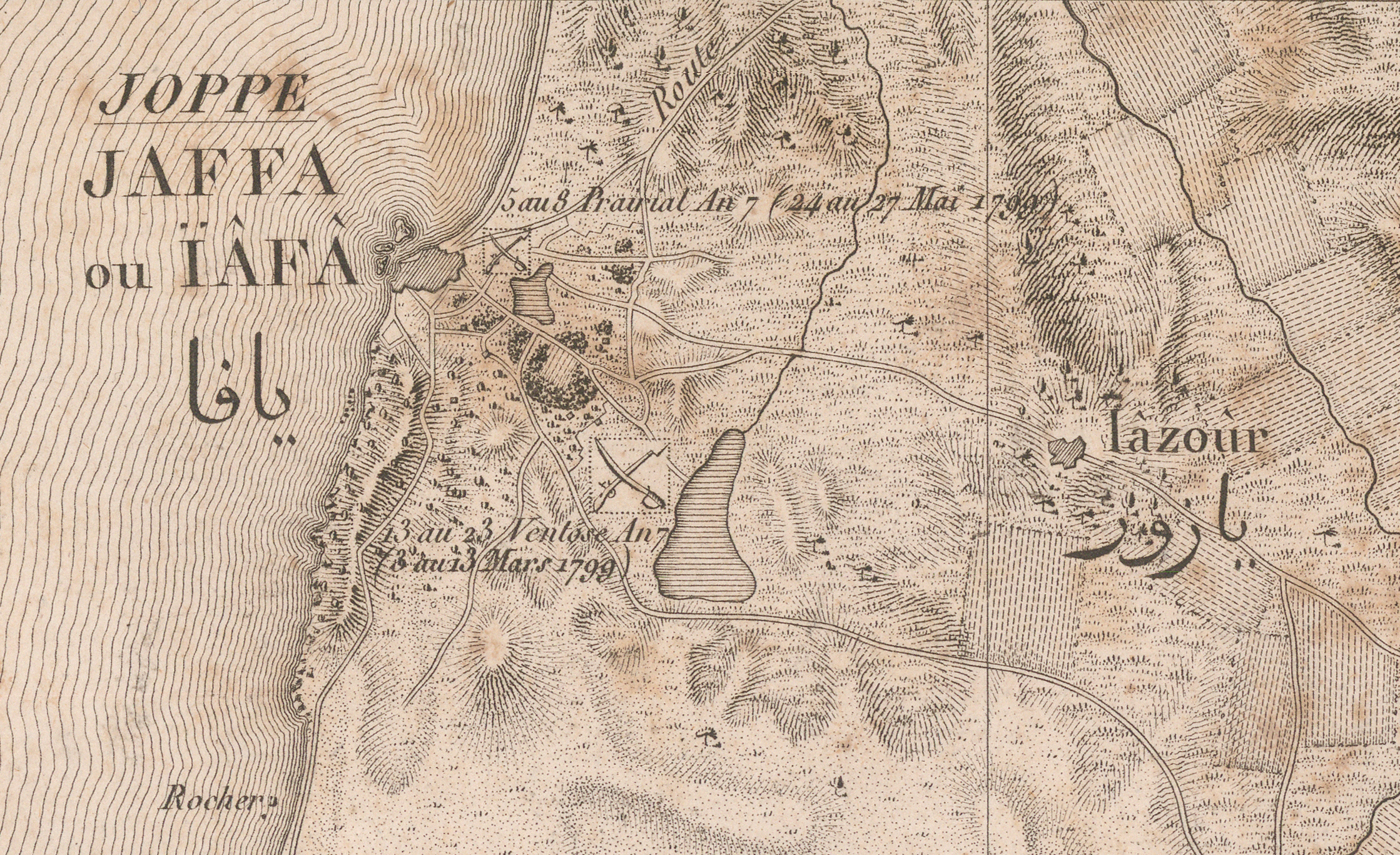
Excerpt from Pierre Jacotin's Map of Egypt (1818), including the dates of Napoleon's siege of Jaffa on 13-23 Ventôse VII (3-13 March 1799), and the dates of the retreat to Jaffa after the siege of Acre on 5-8 Prairial (24-27 May) the same year

The days of the French Revolution and First French Republic saw many efforts to sweep away various trappings of the ancien régime (the old feudal monarchy); some of these were more successful than others. The new Republican government sought to institute, among other reforms, a new social and legal system, a new system of weights and measures (which became the metric system), and a new calendar.

Amid nostalgia for the ancient Roman Republic, the theories of the Age of Enlightenment were at their peak, and the devisers of the new systems looked to nature for their inspiration. Natural constants, multiples of ten, and Latin as well as Ancient Greek derivations formed the fundamental blocks from which the systems were built.

The calendar was created by a commission under the direction of the politician Gilbert Romme seconded by Claude Joseph Ferry and Charles-François Dupuis. They associated with their work chemist Louis-Bernard Guyton de Morveau, mathematician and astronomer Joseph-Louis Lagrange, astronomer Jérôme Lalande, mathematician Gaspard Monge, astronomer and naval geographer Alexandre Guy Pingré, and poet, actor and playwright Fabre d'Églantine (who invented the names of the months) with the help of André Thouin (gardener at the Jardin des plantes of the Muséum National d'Histoire Naturelle in Paris). As the rapporteur of the commission, Romme presented the calendar to the Jacobin-controlled National Convention on 23 September 1793, which adopted it on 24 October 1793 and also extended it proleptically to its epoch of 22 September 1792. It is because of his position as rapporteur of the commission that the creation of the republican calendar is attributed to Romme.

French coins of the period used the calendar. Many show the year (French: an) in Arabic numerals, although Roman numerals were used on some issues. Year 11 coins typically have a "XI" date to avoid confusion with the Roman "II".

== Design ==
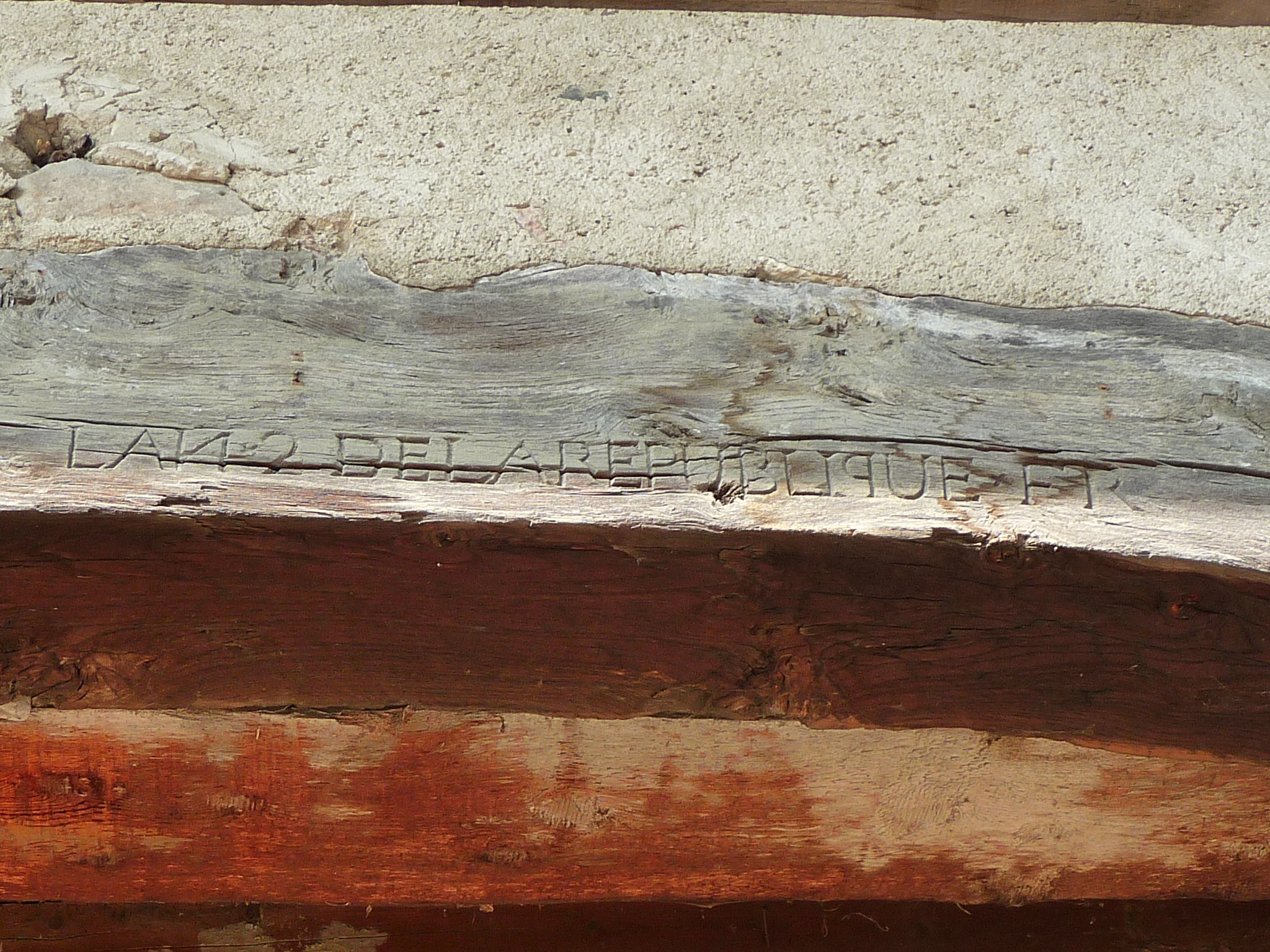
L AN 2 DE LA REPUBLIQUE FR (Year 2 of the French Republic) on a barn near Geneva, dating to 1793 or 1794

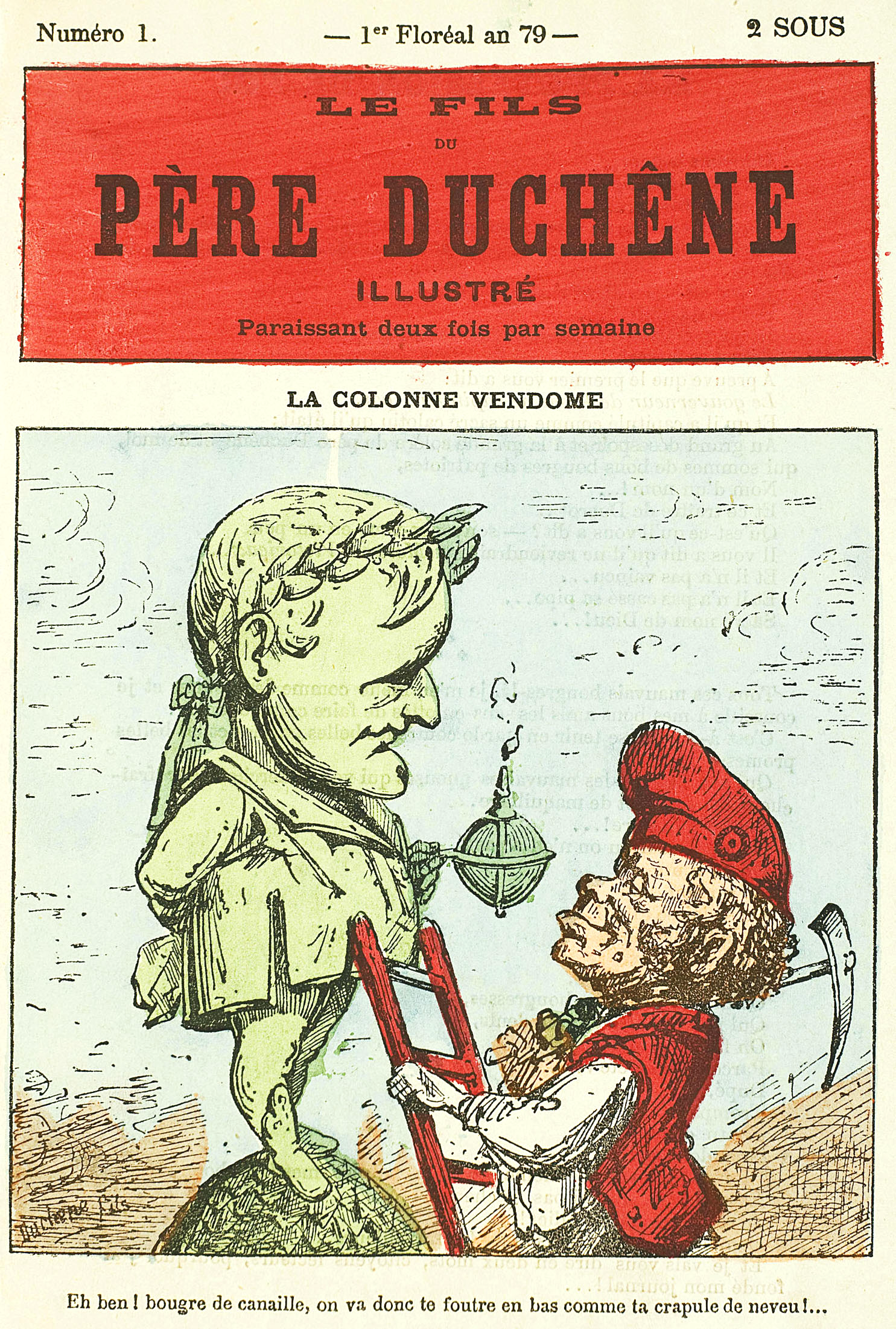
1 Floréal, Year 79 issue of Le Fils du Père Duchêne, a newspaper published during the Paris Commune.

Years usually appear in writing as Roman numerals. Roman numeral I indicates the first year of the republic, that is, the year before the calendar actually came into use. By law, the beginning of each year was set at midnight, beginning on the day the apparent autumnal equinox falls at the Paris Observatory.

There were twelve months, each divided into three 10-day weeks called décades. The tenth day, décadi, replaced Sunday as the day of rest and festivity. The five or six extra days needed to approximate the solar or tropical year were placed after the final month of each year and called complementary days. This arrangement was an almost exact copy of the calendar used by the Ancient Egyptians, though in their case the year did not begin and end on the autumnal equinox.

A period of four years ending on a leap day was to be called a "Franciade". The name "Olympique" was originally proposed but changed to Franciade to commemorate the fact that it had taken the revolution four years to establish a republican government in France. The leap year was called Sextile, an allusion to the "bissextile" leap years of the Julian and Gregorian calendars, because it contained a sixth complementary day.

Each day was divided into ten hours, each hour into 100 decimal minutes, and each decimal minute into 100 decimal seconds. Thus an hour was 144 conventional minutes (2.4 times as long as a conventional hour), a minute was 86.4 conventional seconds (44% longer than a conventional minute), and a second was 0.864 conventional seconds (13.6% shorter than a conventional second). Clocks were manufactured to display this decimal time, but it did not catch on. Mandatory use of decimal time was officially suspended 7 April 1795, although some cities continued to use decimal time as late as 1801. The numbering of years by Roman numerals ran counter to this general decimalisation tendency.

=== Months ===
The month names were based on nature, principally having to do with the prevailing weather in and around Paris and sometimes evoking the Medieval Labours of the Months. The extra five or six days in the year were not given a month designation but considered Sansculottides or complementary days. Most of the month names were new words coined from French, Latin, or Greek. The endings of the names were grouped by season. -dor comes from δῶρον, dō̂ron means 'giving' in Greek.

- Autumn:
  - Vendémiaire (from French vendange, which means 'grape harvest', derived from Latin vindemia 'vintage'), starting 22, 23, or 24 September
  - Brumaire (from French brume 'mist', from Latin brūma 'winter solstice; winter; winter cold'), starting 22, 23, or 24 October
  - Frimaire (from French frimas 'frost'), starting 21, 22, or 23 November
- Winter:
  - Nivôse (from Latin nivosus 'snowy'), starting 21, 22, or 23 December
  - Pluviôse (from French pluvieux, derived from Latin pluvius 'rainy'), starting 20, 21, or 22 January
  - Ventôse (from French venteux, derived from Latin ventosus 'windy'), starting 19, 20, or 21 February
- Spring:
  - Germinal (from French germination), starting 21 or 22 March
  - Floréal (from French fleur, derived from Latin flos 'flower'), starting 20 or 21 April
  - Prairial (from French prairie 'meadow'), starting 20 or 21 May
- Summer:
  - Messidor (from Latin messis 'harvest'), starting 19 or 20 June
  - Thermidor (from Greek θέρμη, thermē, 'summer heat'), starting 19 or 20 July; on many printed calendars of Year II (1793–94), the month of Thermidor was named Fervidor (from Latin fervidus, "burning hot")
  - Fructidor (from Latin fructus 'fruit'), starting 18 or 19 August

In Britain, a contemporary wit mocked the calendar by calling the months: Wheezy, Sneezy, and Freezy; Slippy, Drippy, and Nippy; Showery, Flowery, and Bowery; Hoppy, Croppy, and Poppy. Historian Thomas Carlyle suggests somewhat more serious English names in his 1837 work The French Revolution: A History, namely Vintagearious, Fogarious, Frostarious, Snowous, Rainous, Windous, Buddal, Floweral, Meadowal, Reapidor, Heatidor, and Fruitidor. Like the French originals, they are neologisms suggesting a meaning related to the season.

=== Days ===
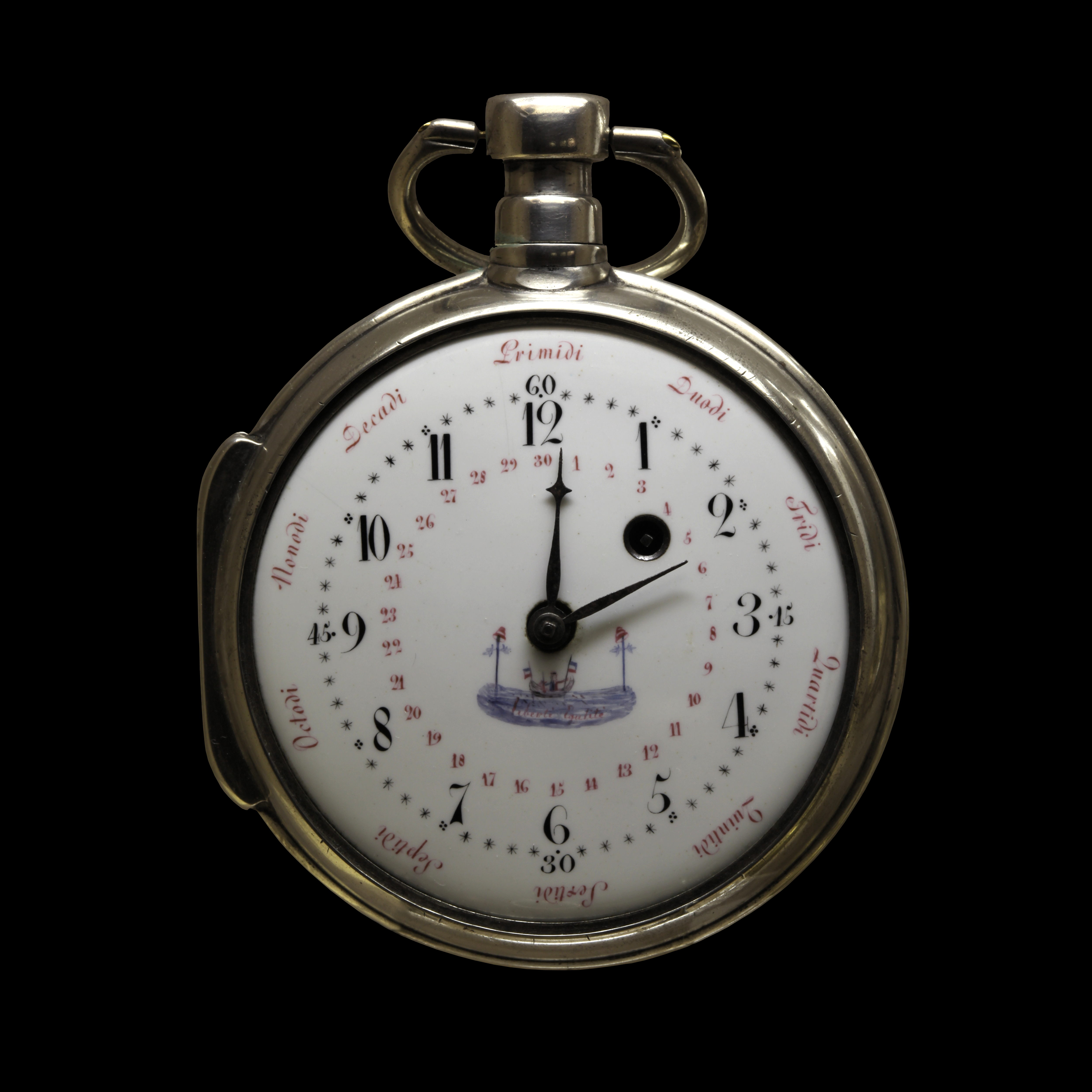
French Revolutionary pocket watch showing ten-day décade names and thirty-day month numbers from the Republican Calendar, but with duodecimal time. On display at the Musée d'Art et d'Histoire (Neuchâtel) In Switzerland.

Each month was divided into three décades or "weeks" of ten days each, named:

- primidi (first day)
- duodi (second day)
- tridi (third day)
- quartidi (fourth day)
- quintidi (fifth day)
- sextidi (sixth day)
- septidi (seventh day)
- octidi (eighth day)
- nonidi (ninth day)
- décadi (tenth day)

Décadis became an official day of rest instead of Sunday, in order to diminish the influence of the Roman Catholic Church. They were used for the festivals of a succession of new religions meant to replace Catholicism: the Cult of Reason, the Cult of the Supreme Being, the Decadary Cult, and Theophilanthropy. Christian holidays were officially abolished in favor of revolutionary holidays. The law of 13 Fructidor year VI (30 August 1798) required that marriages must only be celebrated on décadis. This law was applied from the 1st Vendémiaire year VII (22 September 1798) to 28 Pluviôse year VIII (17 February 1800).

Five extra days – six in leap years – were national holidays at the end of every year. These were originally known as les sans-culottides (after sans-culottes), but after year III (1795) as les jours complémentaires:

- 1st complementary day: La Fête de la Vertu, "Celebration of Virtue", on 17 or 18 September
- 2nd complementary day: La Fête du Génie, "Celebration of Talent", on 18 or 19 September
- 3rd complementary day: La Fête du Travail, "Celebration of Labour", on 19 or 20 September
- 4th complementary day: La Fête de l'Opinion, "Celebration of Convictions", on 20 or 21 September
- 5th complementary day: La Fête des Récompenses, "Celebration of Honours (Awards)", on 21 or 22 September
- 6th complementary day: La Fête de la Révolution, "Celebration of the Revolution", on 22 or 23 September (on leap years only)

=== Rural calendar ===
The Roman Catholic Church used a calendar of saints, which named each day of the year after an associated saint. To reduce the influence of the Church, Fabre d'Églantine introduced a rural calendar in which each day of the year had a unique name associated with the rural economy, stated to correspond to the time of year. Every décadi (ending in 0) was named after an agricultural tool. Each quintidi (ending in 5) was named for a common animal. The rest of the days were named for "grain, pasture, trees, roots, flowers, fruits" and other plants, except for the first month of winter, Nivôse, during which the rest of the days were named after minerals.

Our starting point was the idea of celebrating, through the calendar, the agricultural system, and of leading the nation back to it, marking the times and the fractions of the year by intelligible or visible signs taken from agriculture and the rural economy. (...)

As the calendar is something that we use so often, we must take advantage of this frequency of use to put elementary notions of agriculture before the people – to show the richness of nature, to make them love the fields, and to methodically show them the order of the influences of the heavens and of the products of the earth.

The priests assigned the commemoration of a so-called saint to each day of the year: this catalogue exhibited neither utility nor method; it was a collection of lies, of deceit or of charlatanism.

We thought that the nation, after having kicked out this canonised mob from its calendar, must replace it with the objects that make up the true riches of the nation, worthy objects not from a cult, but from agriculture – useful products of the soil, the tools that we use to cultivate it, and the domesticated animals, our faithful servants in these works; animals much more precious, without doubt, to the eye of reason, than the beatified skeletons pulled from the catacombs of Rome.

So we have arranged in the column of each month, the names of the real treasures of the rural economy. The grains, the pastures, the trees, the roots, the flowers, the fruits, the plants are arranged in the calendar, in such a way that the place and the day of the month that each product occupies is precisely the season and the day that Nature presents it to us.

— Fabre d'Églantine, "Rapport fait à la Convention nationale au nom de la Commission chargée de la confection du Calendrier", Imprimerie nationale, 1793

== Criticism and shortcomings ==
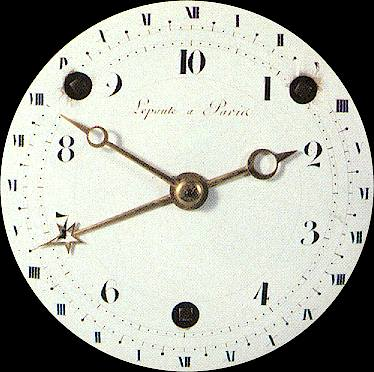
Clock dial displaying both decimal and duodecimal time

Leap years in the calendar are a point of great dispute, due to the contradicting statements in the establishing decree stating:

Each year begins at midnight, with the day on which the true autumnal equinox falls for the Paris Observatory.

and:

The four-year period, after which the addition of a day is usually necessary, is called the Franciade in memory of the revolution which, after four years of effort, led France to republican government. The fourth year of the Franciade is called Sextile.

These two specifications are incompatible, as leap years defined by the autumnal equinox in Paris do not recur on a regular four-year schedule. It was erroneously believed that one leap day would be skipped automatically every 129 years, on average, but actually five years would sometimes pass between leap years, about three times per century. Thus, the years III, VII, and XI were observed as leap years, and the years XV and XX were also planned as such, even though they were five years apart.

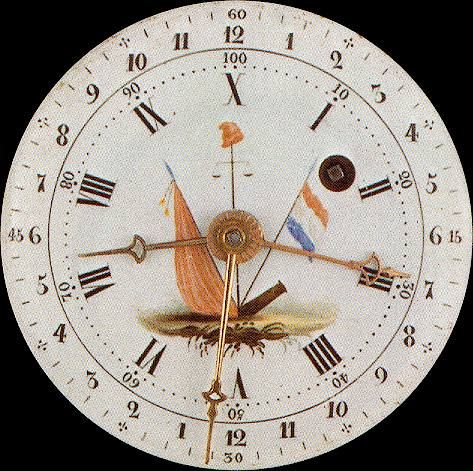
Clock dial displaying both decimal (inside the circle) and duodecimal time (on the outer rim)

A fixed arithmetic rule for determining leap years was proposed by Delambre and presented to the Committee of Public Education by Romme on 19 Floréal An III (8 May 1795). The proposed rule was to determine leap years by applying the rules of the Gregorian calendar to the years of the French Republic (years IV, VIII, XII, etc. were to be leap years) except that year 4000 (the last year of ten 400-year periods) should be a common year instead of a leap year. Shortly thereafter, Romme was sentenced to the guillotine and committed suicide, and the proposal was never adopted, although Jérôme Lalande repeatedly proposed it for a number of years.

The proposal was intended to avoid uncertain future leap years caused by the inaccurate astronomical knowledge of the 1790s (even today, this statement is still valid due to the uncertainty in ΔT). In particular, the committee noted that the autumnal equinox of year 144 was predicted to occur at 11:59:40 pm local apparent time in Paris, which was closer to midnight than its inherent 3 to 4 minute uncertainty.

The calendar was abolished by an act dated 22 Fructidor an XIII (9 September 1805) and signed by Napoleon, which referred to a report by Michel-Louis-Étienne Regnaud de Saint-Jean d'Angély and Jean Joseph Mounier, listing two fundamental flaws.

1. The rule for leap years depended upon the uneven course of the sun, rather than fixed intervals, so that one must consult astronomers to determine when each year started, especially when the equinox happened close to midnight, as the exact moment could not be predicted with certainty.
2. Both the era and the beginning of the year were chosen to commemorate a historical event that occurred on the first day of autumn in France, whereas the other European nations began the year near the beginning of winter or spring, thus being impediments to the calendar's adoption in Europe and America, and even a part of the French nation, where the Gregorian calendar continued to be used, as it was required for religious purposes.

The report also notes that the 10-day décade was unpopular and had already been suppressed three years earlier in favor of the seven-day week, removing what was considered by some as one of the calendar's main benefits. The 10-day décade was unpopular with laborers because they received only one full day of rest out of ten, instead of one in seven, although they also got a half-day off on the fifth day (thus 36 full days and 36 half days in a year, for a total of 54 free days, compared to the usual 52 or 53 Sundays). It also, by design, conflicted with Sunday religious observances.

Another criticism of the calendar was that despite the poetic names of its months, they were tied to the climate and agriculture of metropolitan France and therefore not applicable to France's overseas territories.

== Gallery ==
The following pictures, showing twelve allegories for the months, were illustrated by French painter Louis Lafitte and engraved by Salvatore Tresca.

=== Autumn ===
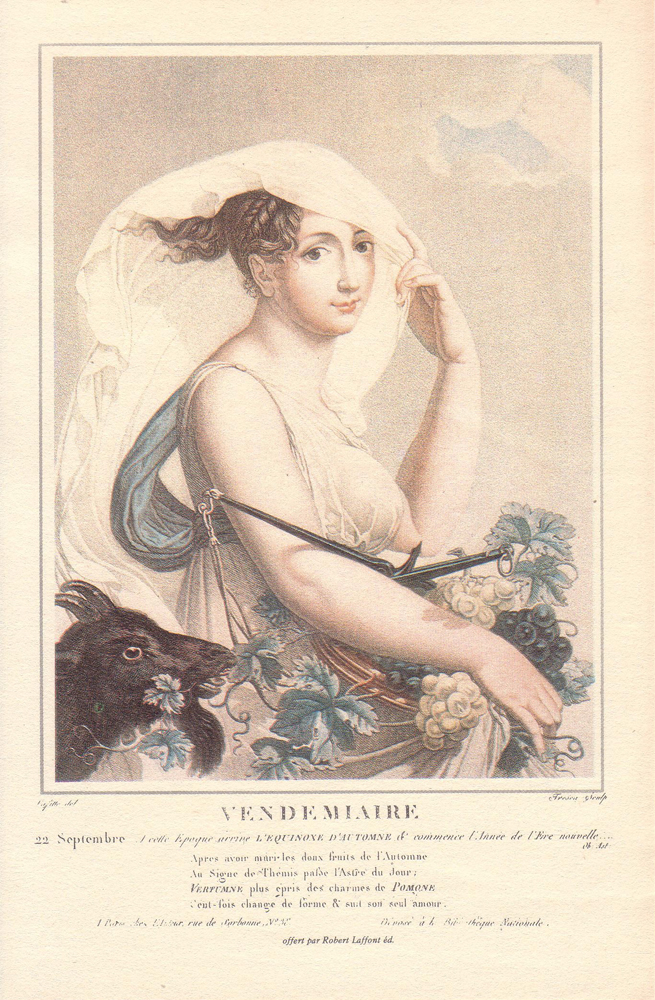

Vendémiaire
(22/24 September – 21/23 October)
1
22 Sep
Raisin (Grape)
2
23 Sep
Safran (Saffron)
3
24 Sep
Châtaigne (Chestnut)
4
25 Sep
Colchique (Autumn Crocus)
5
26 Sep
Cheval (Horse)
6
27 Sep
Balsamine (Impatiens)
7
28 Sep
Carotte (Carrot)
8
29 Sep
Amaranthe (Amaranth)
9
30 Sep
Panais (Parsnip)
10
1 Oct
Cuve (Vat)
11
2 Oct
Pomme de terre (Potato)
12
3 Oct
Immortelle (Strawflower)
13
4 Oct
Potiron (Winter squash)
14
5 Oct
Réséda (Mignonette)
15
6 Oct
Âne (Donkey)
16
7 Oct
Belle de nuit (Four o'clock flower)
17
8 Oct
Citrouille (Pumpkin)
18
9 Oct
Sarrasin (Buckwheat)
19
10 Oct
Tournesol (Sunflower)
20
11 Oct
Pressoir (Winepress)
21
12 Oct
Chanvre (Hemp)
22
13 Oct
Pêche (Peach)
23
14 Oct
Navet (Turnip)
24
15 Oct
Amaryllis (Amaryllis)
25
16 Oct
Bœuf (Ox)
26
17 Oct
Aubergine (Eggplant)
27
18 Oct
Piment (Chili pepper)
28
19 Oct
Tomate (Tomato)
29
20 Oct
Orge (Barley)
30
21 Oct
Tonneau (Barrel)

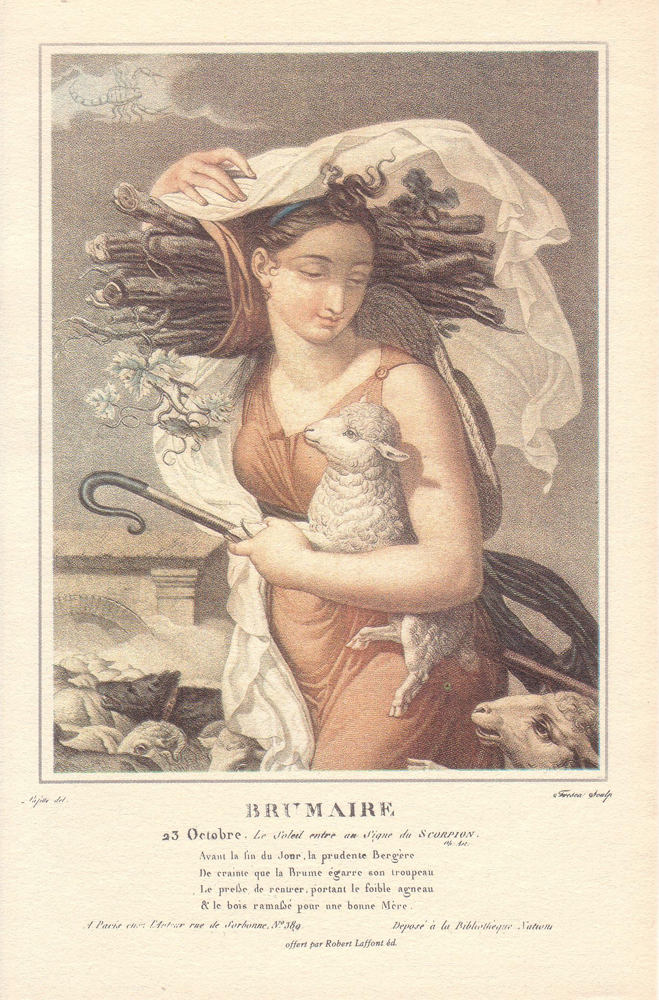

Brumaire
(22/24 October – 20/22 November)
1
22 Oct
Pomme (Apple)
2
23 Oct
Céleri (Celery)
3
24 Oct
Poire (Pear)
4
25 Oct
Betterave (Beetroot)
5
26 Oct
Oie (Goose)
6
27 Oct
Héliotrope (Heliotrope)
7
28 Oct
Figue (Common fig)
8
29 Oct
Scorsonère (Black Salsify)
9
30 Oct
Alisier (Chequer Tree)
10
31 Oct
Charrue (Plough)
11
1 Nov
Salsifis (Salsify)
12
2 Nov
Mâcre (Water caltrop)
13
3 Nov
Topinambour (Jerusalem artichoke)
14
4 Nov
Endive (Endive)
15
5 Nov
Dindon (Turkey)
16
6 Nov
Chervis (Skirret)
17
7 Nov
Cresson (Watercress)
18
8 Nov
Dentelaire (Leadworts)
19
9 Nov
Grenade (Pomegranate)
20
10 Nov
Herse (Harrow)
21
11 Nov
Bacchante (Baccharis)
22
12 Nov
Azerole (Azarole)
23
13 Nov
Garance (Madder)
24
14 Nov
Orange (Orange)
25
15 Nov
Faisan (Pheasant)
26
16 Nov
Pistache (Pistachio Nut)
27
17 Nov
Macjonc (Tuberous pea)
28
18 Nov
Coing (Quince)
29
19 Nov
Cormier (Service tree)
30
20 Nov
Rouleau (Roller)

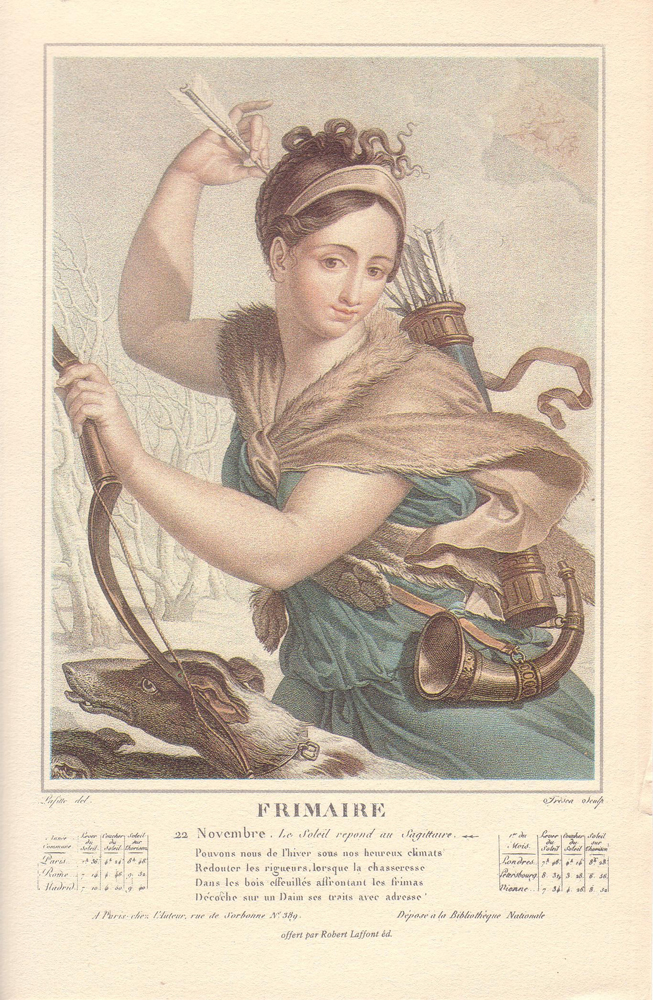

Frimaire
(21/23 November – 20/22 December)
1
21 Nov
Raiponce (Rampion)
2
22 Nov
Turneps (Cattle turnip)
3
23 Nov
Chicorée (Chicory)
4
24 Nov
Nèfle (Medlar)
5
25 Nov
Cochon (Pig)
6
26 Nov
Mâche (Lamb's lettuce)
7
27 Nov
Chou-fleur (Cauliflower)
8
28 Nov
Miel (Honey)
9
29 Nov
Genièvre (Juniper)
10
30 Nov
Pioche (Pickaxe)
11
1 Dec
Cire (Wax)
12
2 Dec
Raifort (Horseradish)
13
3 Dec
Cèdre (Cedar tree)
14
4 Dec
Sapin (Fir)
15
5 Dec
Chevreuil (Roe deer)
16
6 Dec
Ajonc (Gorse)
17
7 Dec
Cyprès (Cypress Tree)
18
8 Dec
Lierre (Ivy)
19
9 Dec
Sabine (Savin Juniper)
20
10 Dec
Hoyau (Fork hoe)
21
11 Dec
Érable à sucre (Sugar Maple)
22
12 Dec
Bruyère (Heather)
23
13 Dec
Roseau (Reed plant)
24
14 Dec
Oseille (Sorrel)
25
15 Dec
Grillon (Cricket)
26
16 Dec
Pignon (Pine nut)
27
17 Dec
Liège (Cork)
28
18 Dec
Truffe (Truffle)
29
19 Dec
Olive (Olive)
30
20 Dec
Pelle (Shovel)

=== Winter ===
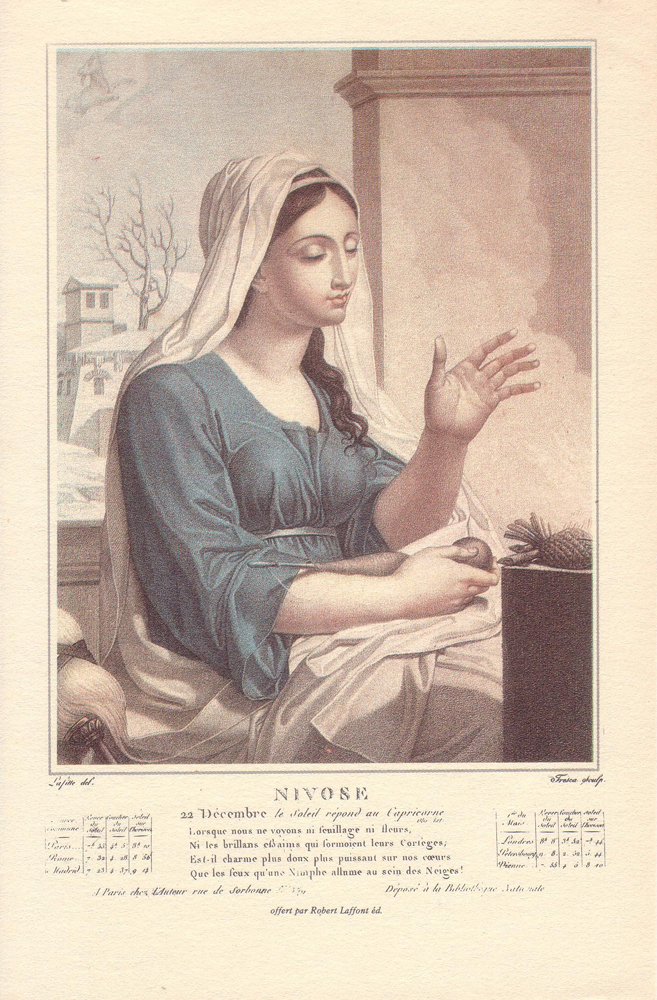

Nivôse
(21/23 December – 19/21 January)
1
21 Dec
Tourbe (Peat)
2
22 Dec
Houille (Coal)
3
23 Dec
Bitume (Bitumen)
4
24 Dec
Soufre (Sulphur)
5
25 Dec
Chien (Dog)
6
26 Dec
Lave (Lava)
7
27 Dec
Terre végétale (Topsoil)
8
28 Dec
Fumier (Manure)
9
29 Dec
Salpêtre (Saltpeter)
10
30 Dec
Fléau (Flail)
11
31 Dec
Granit (Granite)
12
1 Jan
Argile (Clay)
13
2 Jan
Ardoise (Slate)
14
3 Jan
Grès (Sandstone)
15
4 Jan
Lapin (Rabbit)
16
5 Jan
Silex (Flint)
17
6 Jan
Marne (Marl)
18
7 Jan
Pierre à chaux (Limestone)
19
8 Jan
Marbre (Marble)
20
9 Jan
Van (Winnowing fan)
21
10 Jan
Pierre à plâtre (Gypsum)
22
11 Jan
Sel (Salt)
23
12 Jan
Fer (Iron)
24
13 Jan
Cuivre (Copper)
25
14 Jan
Chat (Cat)
26
15 Jan
Étain (Tin)
27
16 Jan
Plomb (Lead)
28
17 Jan
Zinc (Zinc)
29
18 Jan
Mercure (Mercury)
30
19 Jan
Crible (Sieve)

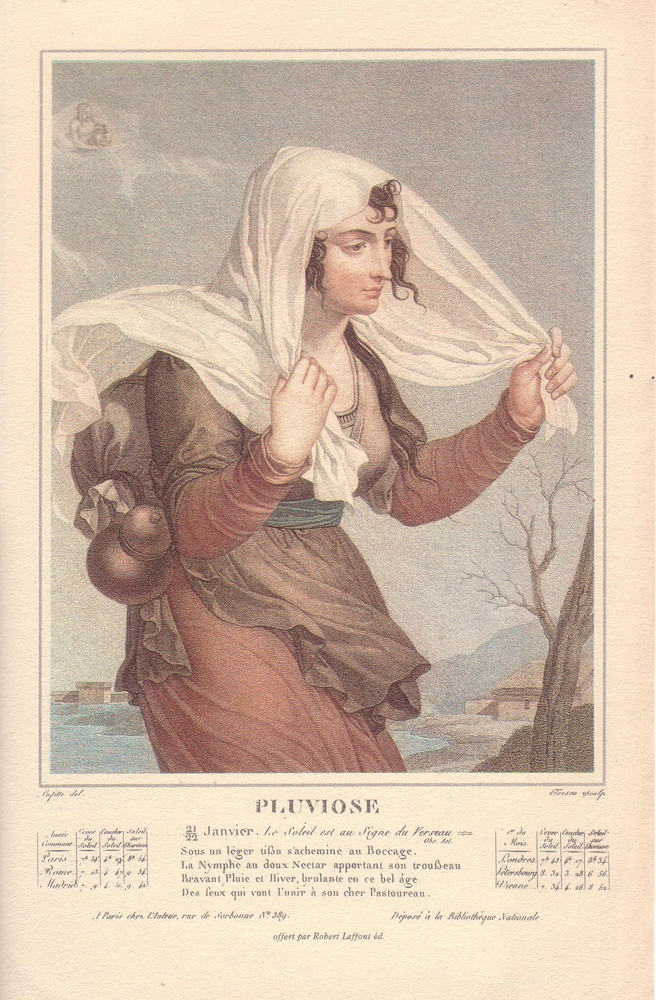

Pluviôse
(20/22 January – 18/20 February)
1
20 Jan
Lauréole (Spurge-laurel)
2
21 Jan
Mousse (Moss)
3
22 Jan
Fragon (Butcher's Broom)
4
23 Jan
Perce-neige (Snowdrop)
5
24 Jan
Taureau (Bull)
6
25 Jan
Laurier-thym (Laurustinus)
7
26 Jan
Amadouvier (Tinder polypore)
8
27 Jan
Mézéréon (Daphne mezereum)
9
28 Jan
Peuplier (Poplar)
10
29 Jan
Coignée (Axe)
11
30 Jan
Ellébore (Hellebore)
12
31 Jan
Brocoli (Broccoli)
13
1 Feb
Laurier (Bay laurel)
14
2 Feb
Avelinier (Filbert)
15
3 Feb
Vache (Cow)
16
4 Feb
Buis (Box Tree)
17
5 Feb
Lichen (Lichen)
18
6 Feb
If (Yew tree)
19
7 Feb
Pulmonaire (Lungwort)
20
8 Feb
Serpette (Billhook)
21
9 Feb
Thlaspi (Pennycress)
22
10 Feb
Thimelé (Rose Daphne)
23
11 Feb
Chiendent (Couch grass)
24
12 Feb
Trainasse (Common Knotgrass)
25
13 Feb
Lièvre (Hare)
26
14 Feb
Guède (Woad)
27
15 Feb
Noisetier (Hazel)
28
16 Feb
Cyclamen (Cyclamen)
29
17 Feb
Chélidoine (Celandine)
30
18 Feb
Traîneau (Sleigh)

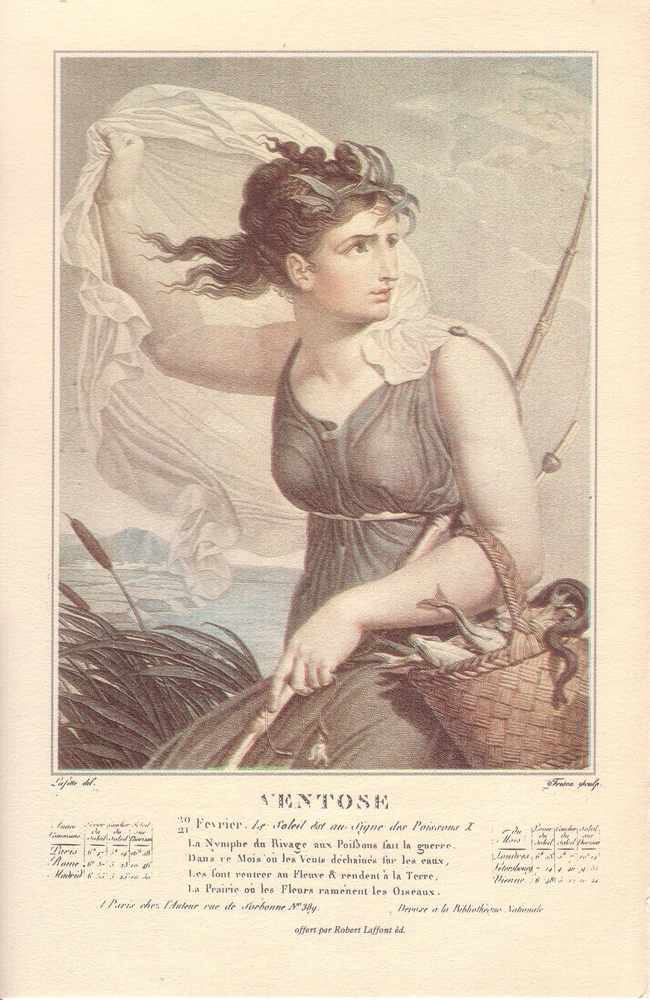

Ventôse
(19/21 February – 20/22 March)
1
19 Feb
Tussilage (Coltsfoot)
2
20 Feb
Cornouiller (Dogwood)
3
21 Feb
Violier (Matthiola)
4
22 Feb
Troène (Privet)
5
23 Feb
Bouc (Billygoat)
6
24 Feb
Asaret (Wild Ginger)
7
25 Feb
Alaterne (Italian Buckthorn)
8
26 Feb
Violette (Violet)
9
27 Feb
Marceau (Goat Willow)
10
28 Feb
Bêche (Spade)
11
1 Mar
Narcisse (Narcissus)
12
2 Mar
Orme (Elm)
13
3 Mar
Fumeterre (Common fumitory)
14
4 Mar
Vélar (Hedge mustard)
15
5 Mar
Chèvre (Goat)
16
6 Mar
Épinard (Spinach)
17
7 Mar
Doronic (Doronicum)
18
8 Mar
Mouron (Pimpernel)
19
9 Mar
Cerfeuil (Chervil)
20
10 Mar
Cordeau (Twine)
21
11 Mar
Mandragore (Mandrake)
22
12 Mar
Persil (Parsley)
23
13 Mar
Cochléaria (Scurvy-grass)
24
14 Mar
Pâquerette (Daisy)
25
15 Mar
Thon (Tuna)
26
16 Mar
Pissenlit (Dandelion)
27
17 Mar
Sylvie (Wood Anemone)
28
18 Mar
Capillaire (Maidenhair fern)
29
19 Mar
Frêne (Ash tree)
30
20 Mar
Plantoir (Dibber)

=== Spring ===
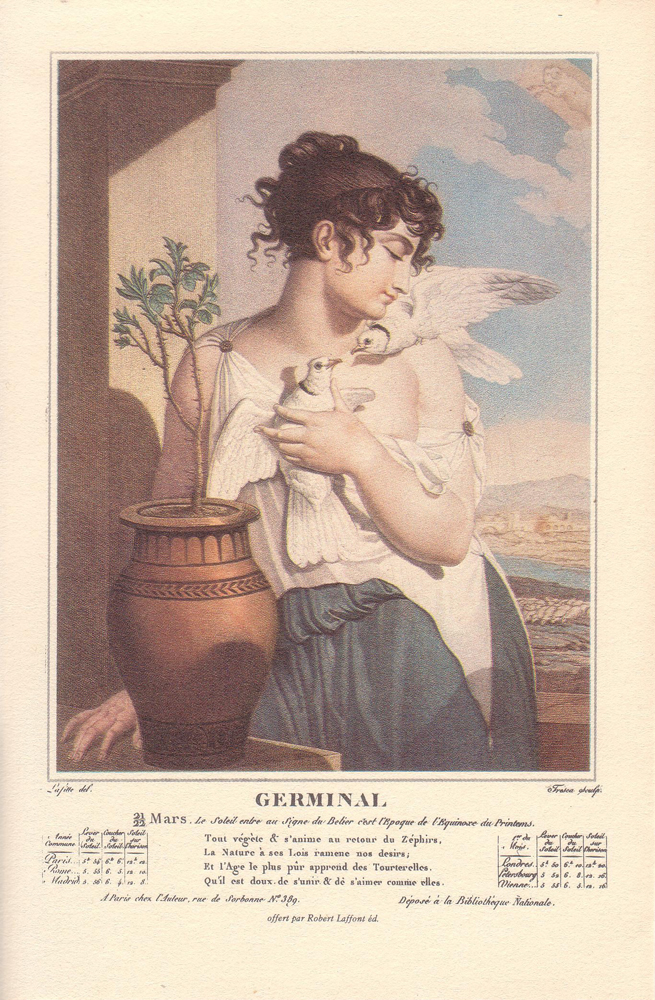

Germinal
(21/23 March – 19/21 April)
1
21 Mar
Primevère (Primrose)
2
22 Mar
Platane (Plane Tree)
3
23 Mar
Asperge (Asparagus)
4
24 Mar
Tulipe (Tulip)
5
25 Mar
Poule (Hen)
6
26 Mar
Bette (Chard)
7
27 Mar
Bouleau (Birch)
8
28 Mar
Jonquille (Daffodil)
9
29 Mar
Aulne (Alder)
10
30 Mar
Couvoir (Incubator)
11
31 Mar
Pervenche (Periwinkle)
12
1 Apr
Charme (Hornbeam)
13
2 Apr
Morille (Morel)
14
3 Apr
Hêtre (Beech Tree)
15
4 Apr
Abeille (Bee)
16
5 Apr
Laitue (Lettuce)
17
6 Apr
Mélèze (Larch)
18
7 Apr
Ciguë (Hemlock)
19
8 Apr
Radis (Radish)
20
9 Apr
Ruche (Beehive)
21
10 Apr
Gainier (Judas tree)
22
11 Apr
Romaine (Romaine lettuce)
23
12 Apr
Marronnier (Horse chestnut)
24
13 Apr
Roquette (Arugula or Rocket)
25
14 Apr
Pigeon (Pigeon)
26
15 Apr
Lilas (Lilac)
27
16 Apr
Anémone (Wood Anemone)
28
17 Apr
Pensée (Pansy)
29
18 Apr
Myrtille (Bilberry)
30
19 Apr
Greffoir (Grafting knife)

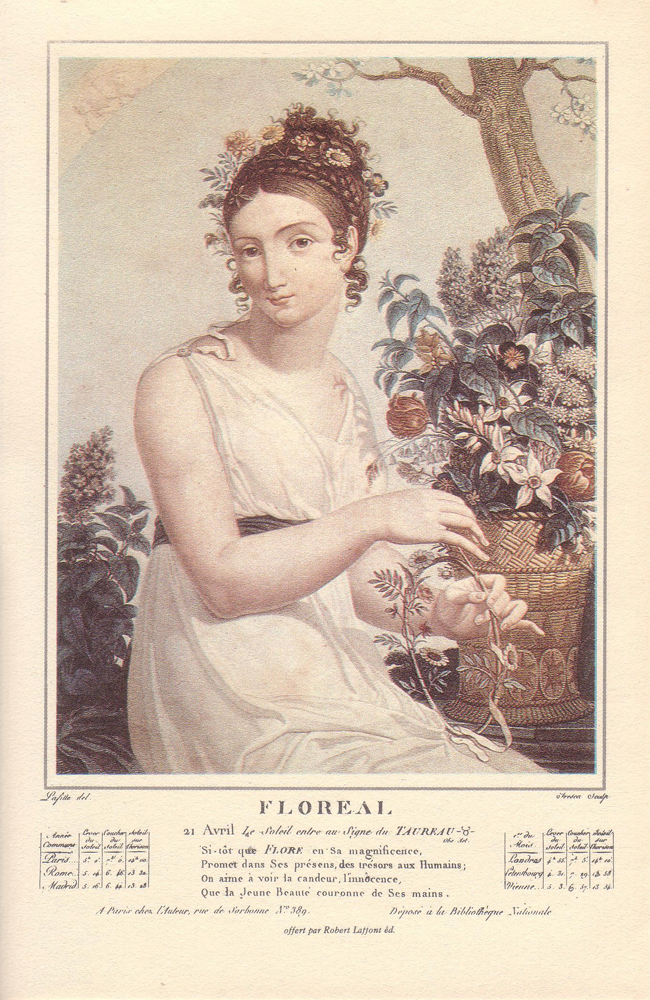

Floréal
(20/22 April – 19/21 May)
1
20 Apr
Rose (Rose)
2
21 Apr
Chêne (Oak Tree)
3
22 Apr
Fougère (Fern)
4
23 Apr
Aubépine (Hawthorn)
5
24 Apr
Rossignol (Nightingale)
6
25 Apr
Ancolie (Common Columbine)
7
26 Apr
Muguet (Lily of the valley)
8
27 Apr
Champignon (Button mushroom)
9
28 Apr
Hyacinthe (Hyacinth)
10
29 Apr
Râteau (Rake)
11
30 Apr
Rhubarbe (Rhubarb)
12
1 May
Sainfoin (Sainfoin)
13
2 May
Bâton d'or (Wallflower)
14
3 May
Chamerisier (Fan Palm tree)
15
4 May
Ver à soie (Silkworm)
16
5 May
Consoude (Comfrey)
17
6 May
Pimprenelle (Salad burnet)
18
7 May
Corbeille d'or (Basket of Gold)
19
8 May
Arroche (Orache)
20
9 May
Sarcloir (Weeding hoe)
21
10 May
Statice (Sea thrift)
22
11 May
Fritillaire (Fritillary)
23
12 May
Bourrache (Borage)
24
13 May
Valériane (Valerian)
25
14 May
Carpe (Carp)
26
15 May
Fusain (Euonymus)
27
16 May
Civette (Chives)
28
17 May
Buglosse (Bugloss)
29
18 May
Sénevé (White mustard)
30
19 May
Houlette (Shepherd's crook)

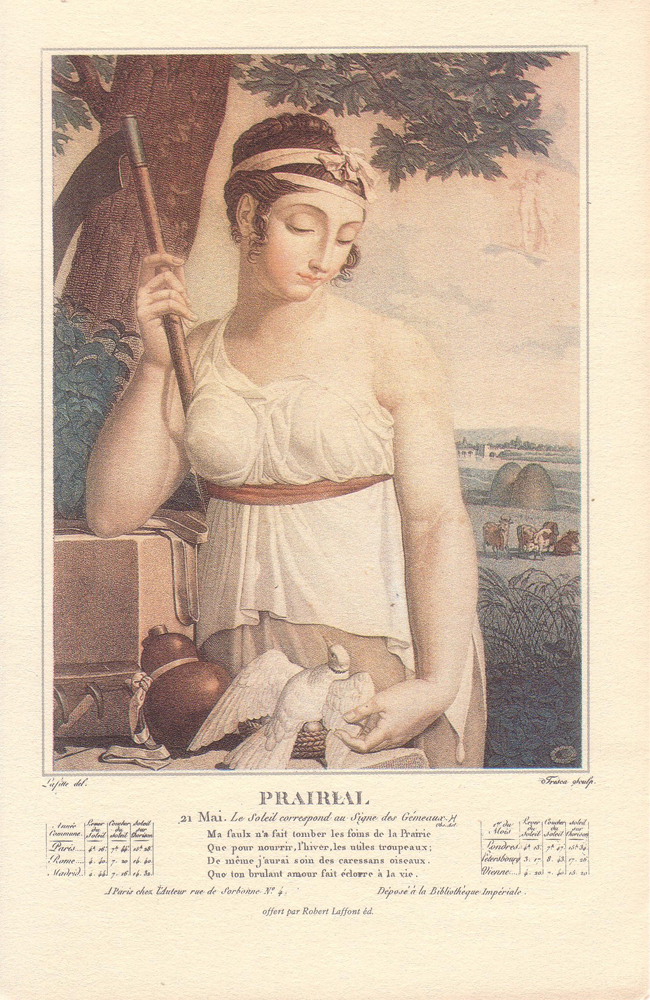

Prairial
(20/22 May – 18/20 June)
1
20 May
Luzerne (Lucerne)
2
21 May
Hémérocalle (Daylily)
3
22 May
Trèfle (Clover)
4
23 May
Angélique (Garden Angelica)
5
24 May
Canard (Duck)
6
25 May
Mélisse (Lemon balm)
7
26 May
Fromental (Oat grass)
8
27 May
Martagon (Martagon lily)
9
28 May
Serpolet (Wild Thyme)
10
29 May
Faux (Scythe)
11
30 May
Fraise (Strawberry)
12
31 May
Bétoine (Betony)
13
1 Jun
Pois (Pea)
14
2 Jun
Acacia (Acacia)
15
3 Jun
Caille (Quail)
16
4 Jun
Œillet (Carnation)
17
5 Jun
Sureau (Elderberry)
18
6 Jun
Pavot (Poppy plant)
19
7 Jun
Tilleul (Linden or Lime tree)
20
8 Jun
Fourche (Pitchfork)
21
9 Jun
Barbeau (Cornflower)
22
10 Jun
Camomille (Camomile)
23
11 Jun
Chèvrefeuille (Honeysuckle)
24
12 Jun
Caille-lait (Bedstraw)
25
13 Jun
Tanche (Tench)
26
14 Jun
Jasmin (Jasmine)
27
15 Jun
Verveine (Vervain)
28
16 Jun
Thym (Thyme)
29
17 Jun
Pivoine (Peony)
30
18 Jun
Chariot (Handcart)

=== Summer ===
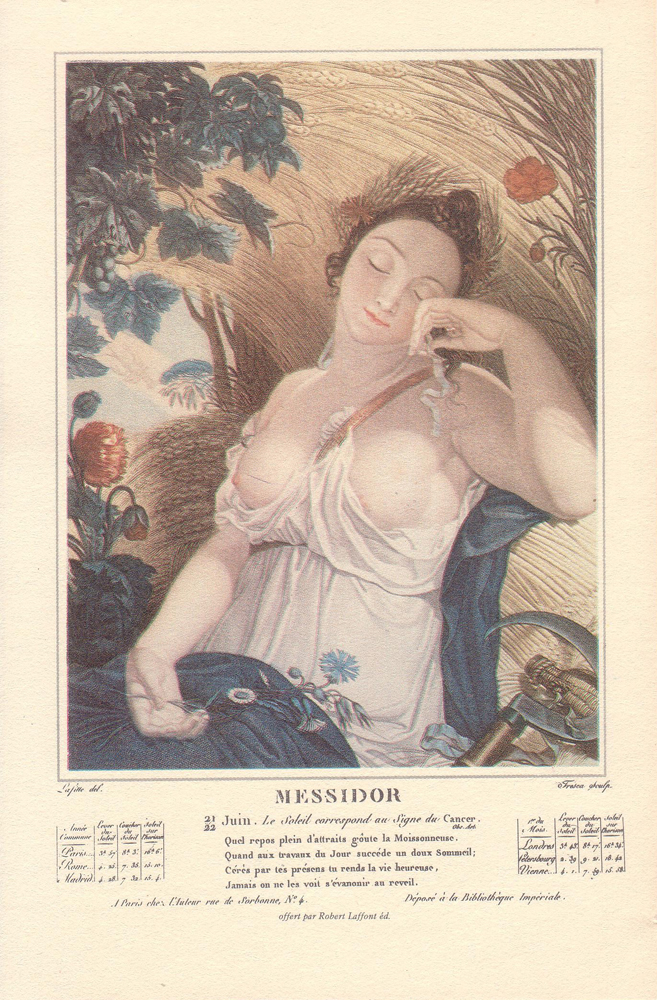

Messidor
(19/21 June – 18/20 July)
1
19 Jun
Seigle (Rye)
2
20 Jun
Avoine (Oat)
3
21 Jun
Oignon (Onion)
4
22 Jun
Véronique (Speedwell)
5
23 Jun
Mulet (Mule)
6
24 Jun
Romarin (Rosemary)
7
25 Jun
Concombre (Cucumber)
8
26 Jun
Échalote (Shallot)
9
27 Jun
Absinthe (Wormwood)
10
28 Jun
Faucille (Sickle)
11
29 Jun
Coriandre (Coriander)
12
30 Jun
Artichaut (Artichoke)
13
1 Jul
Girofle (Clove)
14
2 Jul
Lavande (Lavender)
15
3 Jul
Chamois (Chamois)
16
4 Jul
Tabac (Tobacco)
17
5 Jul
Groseille (Redcurrant)
18
6 Jul
Gesse (Hairy Vetchling)
19
7 Jul
Cerise (Cherry)
20
8 Jul
Parc (Livestock pen)
21
9 Jul
Menthe (Mint)
22
10 Jul
Cumin (Cumin)
23
11 Jul
Haricot (Bean)
24
12 Jul
Orcanète (Alkanet)
25
13 Jul
Pintade (Guineafowl)
26
14 Jul
Sauge (Sage)
27
15 Jul
Ail (Garlic)
28
16 Jul
Vesce (Tare)
29
17 Jul
Blé (Wheat)
30
18 Jul
Chalémie (Shawm)

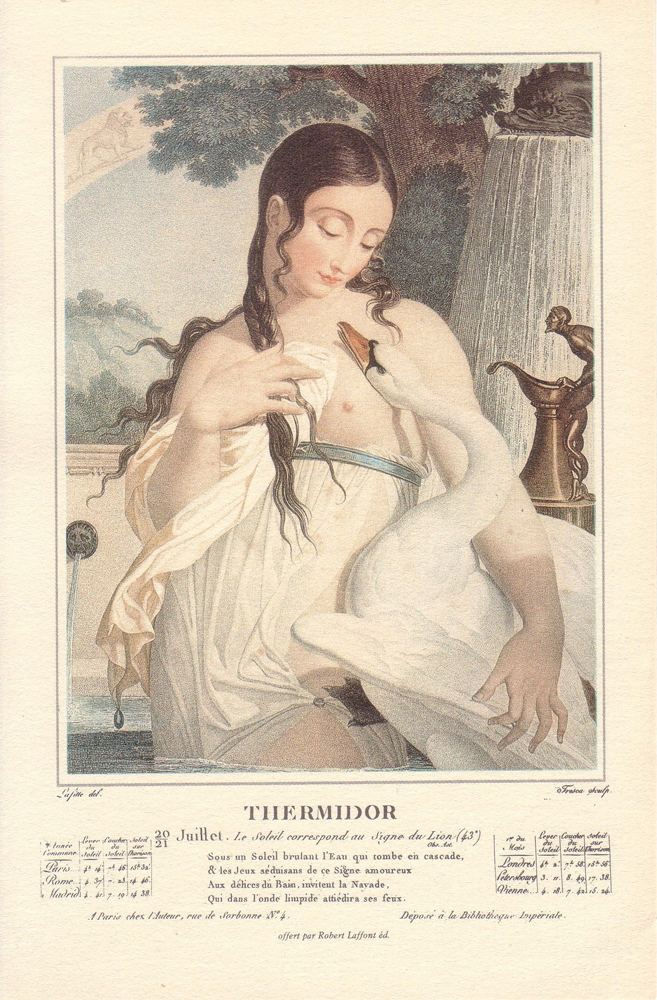

Thermidor
(19/21 July – 17/19 August)
1
19 Jul
Épeautre (Spelt)
2
20 Jul
Bouillon blanc (Common mullein)
3
21 Jul
Melon (Melon)
4
22 Jul
Ivraie (Ryegrass)
5
23 Jul
Bélier (Ram)
6
24 Jul
Prêle (Horsetail)
7
25 Jul
Armoise (Mugwort)
8
26 Jul
Carthame (Safflower)
9
27 Jul
Mûre (Blackberry)
10
28 Jul
Arrosoir (Watering can)
11
29 Jul
Panic (Foxtail millet)
12
30 Jul
Salicorne (Common Glasswort)
13
31 Jul
Abricot (Apricot)
14
1 Aug
Basilic (Basil)
15
2 Aug
Brebis (Ewe)
16
3 Aug
Guimauve (Marshmallow)
17
4 Aug
Lin (Flax)
18
5 Aug
Amande (Almond)
19
6 Aug
Gentiane (Gentian)
20
7 Aug
Écluse (Lock)
21
8 Aug
Carline (Carline thistle)
22
9 Aug
Câprier (Caper)
23
10 Aug
Lentille (Lentil)
24
11 Aug
Aunée (Inula)
25
12 Aug
Loutre (Otter)
26
13 Aug
Myrte (Myrtle)
27
14 Aug
Colza (Rapeseed)
28
15 Aug
Lupin (Lupin)
29
16 Aug
Coton (Cotton)
30
17 Aug
Moulin (Mill)

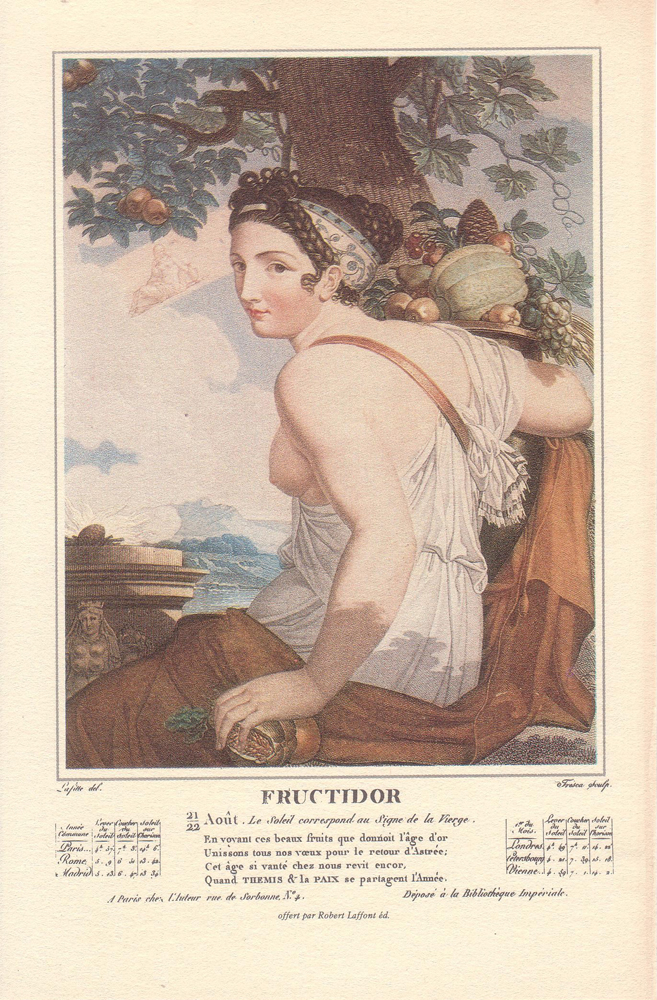

Fructidor
(18/20 August – 16/18 September)
1
18 Aug
Prune (Plum)
2
19 Aug
Millet (Millet)
3
20 Aug
Lycoperdon (Puffball)
4
21 Aug
Escourgeon (Six-row Barley)
5
22 Aug
Saumon (Salmon)
6
23 Aug
Tubéreuse (Tuberose)
7
24 Aug
Sucrion (Winter Barley)
8
25 Aug
Apocyn (Apocynum)
9
26 Aug
Réglisse (Liquorice)
10
27 Aug
Échelle (Ladder)
11
28 Aug
Pastèque (Watermelon)
12
29 Aug
Fenouil (Fennel)
13
30 Aug
Épine vinette (European Barberry)
14
31 Aug
Noix (Walnut)
15
1 Sep
Truite (Trout)
16
2 Sep
Citron (Lemon)
17
3 Sep
Cardère (Teasel)
18
4 Sep
Nerprun (Buckthorn)
19
5 Sep
Tagette (Mexican Marigold)
20
6 Sep
Hotte (Harvesting basket)
21
7 Sep
Églantier (Wild Rose)
22
8 Sep
Noisette (Hazelnut)
23
9 Sep
Houblon (Hops)
24
10 Sep
Sorgho (Sorghum)
25
11 Sep
Écrevisse (Crayfish)
26
12 Sep
Bigarade (Bitter orange)
27
13 Sep
Verge d'or (Goldenrod)
28
14 Sep
Maïs (Maize or Corn)
29
15 Sep
Marron (Sweet Chestnut)
30
16 Sep
Panier (Pack Basket)

== Conversion to conventional timekeeping ==
=== During the Republic ===
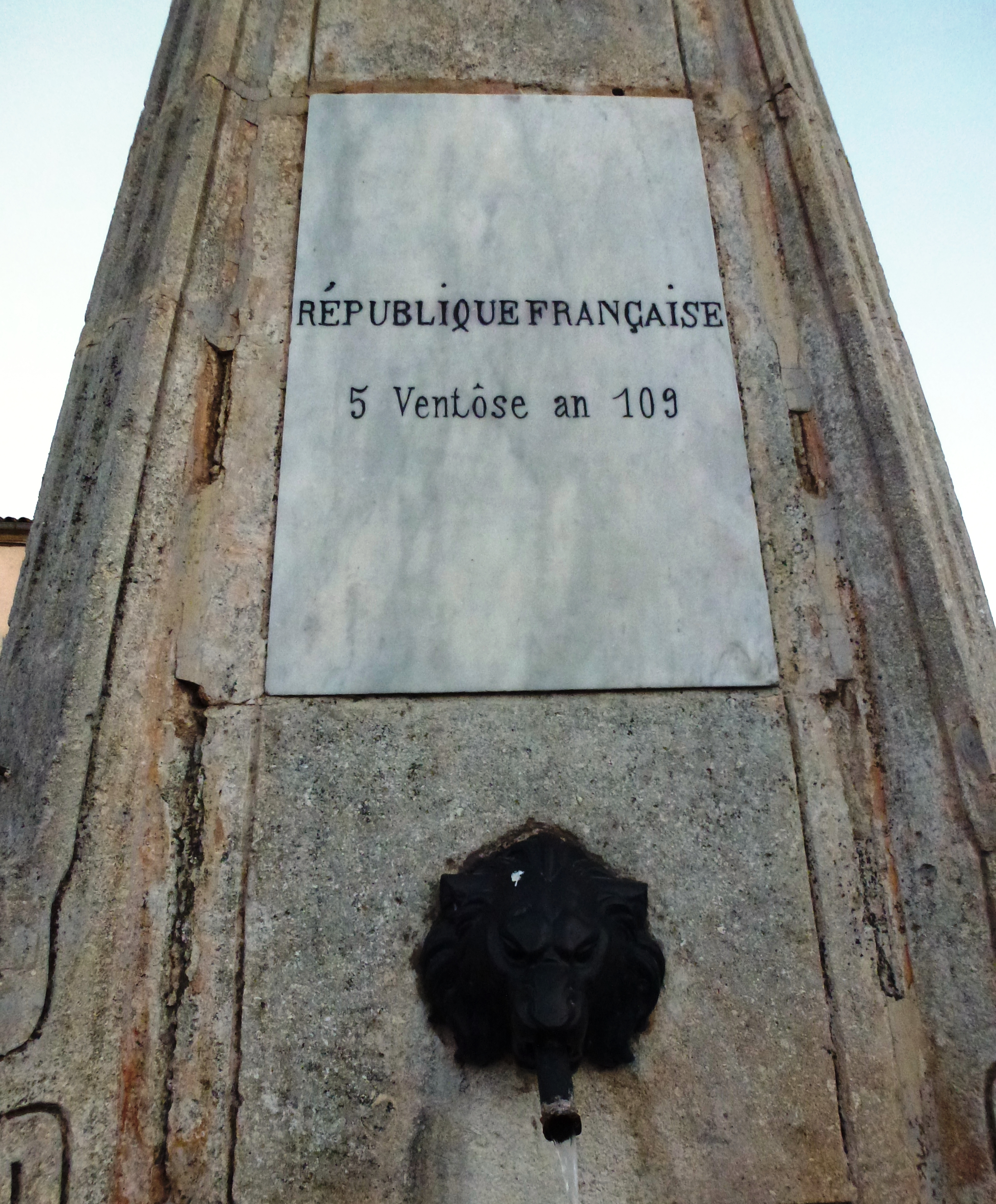
Fountain in Octon, Hérault, with date 5 Ventôse an 109 (24 February 1901)

Below are the Gregorian dates each year of the Republican Era (French: Ère Républicaine) began while the calendar was in effect. Extra (sextile) day inserted before date, due to previous leap year

Republican Era		Gregorian date
I	1	22 September 1792
II	2	22 September 1793
III	3	22 September 1794 (leap year)
IV	4	23 September 1795
V	5	22 September 1796
VI	6	22 September 1797
VII	7	22 September 1798 (leap year)
VIII	8	23 September 1799
IX	9	23 September 1800
X	10	23 September 1801
XI	11	23 September 1802 (leap year)
XII	12	24 September 1803
XIII	13	23 September 1804
XIV	14	23 September 1805
LXXIX	15	23 September 1870

=== After the Republic ===
Today (at UTC+00)
- Saturday, 14 November 2026
- French Republican: Décade III, Tridi de Brumaire de l'Année 235 de la République
Other calendars
Akan	Nwonamemene
Armenian	27 Trē 1476
Aztec	Tlacaxipehualiztli 3, 10 Cōzcacuāuhtli
Babylonian	3 Arakhsamna, 2337 SE
Balinese pawukon	Luang, Pepet, Beteng, Laba, Keliwon, Aryang, Saniscara of Landep, Brahma, Jangur, Raja
Bengali	29 Kartik, BS 1433
Chinese	Yang Water Dragon・Root Mansion; Fire Horse Year, Month 10, Day 6 (Lidong, 8 days until Xiaoxue)
Common Era	14 November 2026 CE
Coptic	5 Hathor, AM 1743
Egyptian	2 Pharmuthi, 2775 NE
Ethiopian	5 H̱edār, 2019 Amätä Məhrät
Gregorian	14 November, AD 2026
Hebrew	4 Kislev, AM 5787
Hindu	Pūrvāṣāḍha・Dhṛti; Solar: 28 Kārtika, 1948 SE; Lunisolar: Pañcamī, Śukla pakṣa of Kārtika, 2083 VE; Rāudra・5127 KY・1,872,893
Icelandic	Laugardagur, 22 Gormánuður 2026
Islamic	3 Jumada al-thani, AH 1448 (using tabular method)
ISO week date	2026-W46-6
Japanese	6 Kannazuki, Reiwa 8 (Rittō, 8 days until Shōsetsu)
Julian	1 November, AD 2026 (AM 7535)
Julian day	2461359
Korean	6 Dwaejidal, 4359 DE
Maya	13.0.14.1.16; 9 Ceh, 10 Cib
Roman	Kalendis Novembribus, MMDCCLXXIX AUC
Solar Hijri	23 Aban, SH 1405
Tibetan	5 smin drug, me pho rta 2153 or 1772 or 1000

The Republican Calendar was abolished in the year XIV (1805). After this year, there are two historically attested calendars which may be used to determine dates. Both calendars gave the same dates for years 17 to 52 (1808–1844), always beginning on 23 September, and it was suggested, but never adopted, that the reformed calendar be implemented during this period, before the Republican Calendar was abolished.

- Republican Calendar: The only legal calendar during the Republic. The first day of the year, 1 Vendémiaire, is always the day the autumn equinox occurs in Paris. About every 30 years, leap years are 5 years apart instead of 4, as happened between the leap years 15 and 20. The lengths of the first 524 years were calculated by Jean Baptiste Joseph Delambre.
- Reformed Republican Calendar: Following a proposal by Delambre in order to make leap years regular and predictable, with leap years being every year divisible by 4, except years divisible by 100 and not by 400. Years divisible by 4000 would also be ordinary years. Intended to be implemented in year 3, the reformed calendar was abandoned after the death of Romme, the head of the calendar committee. This calendar also has the benefit that every year in the third century of the Republican Era (1992–2091) begins on 22 September.

=== Current date and time ===
For this calendar, Delambre's revised method of calculating leap years is used. Other methods may differ by one day. Time may be cached and therefore not accurate. Decimal time is according to Paris Mean Time, which is 9 minutes 21 seconds (6.49 decimal minutes) ahead of Greenwich Mean Time (GMT).

Year: 235
Month: Brumaire
Year: CCXXXV

Weekday:
Primidi
Duodi
Tridi
Quartidi
Quintidi
Sextidi
Septidi
Octidi
Nonidi
Décadi

décade 4
1	Thursday; 22 October 2026
2	Friday; 23 October 2026
3	Saturday; 24 October 2026
4	Sunday; 25 October 2026
5	Monday; 26 October 2026
6	Tuesday; 27 October 2026
7	Wednesday; 28 October 2026
8	Thursday; 29 October 2026
9	Friday; 30 October 2026
10	Saturday; 31 October 2026

décade 5
11	Sunday; 1 November 2026
12	Monday; 2 November 2026
13	Tuesday; 3 November 2026
14	Wednesday; 4 November 2026
15	Thursday; 5 November 2026
16	Friday; 6 November 2026
17	Saturday; 7 November 2026
18	Sunday; 8 November 2026
19	Monday; 9 November 2026
20	Tuesday; 10 November 2026

décade 6
21	Wednesday; 11 November 2026
22	Thursday; 12 November 2026
23	Friday; 13 November 2026
24	Saturday; 14 November 2026
25	Sunday; 15 November 2026
26	Monday; 16 November 2026
27	Tuesday; 17 November 2026
28	Wednesday; 18 November 2026
29	Thursday; 19 November 2026
30	Friday; 20 November 2026

Decimal time – 10 h/day
Paris
8h48m69s

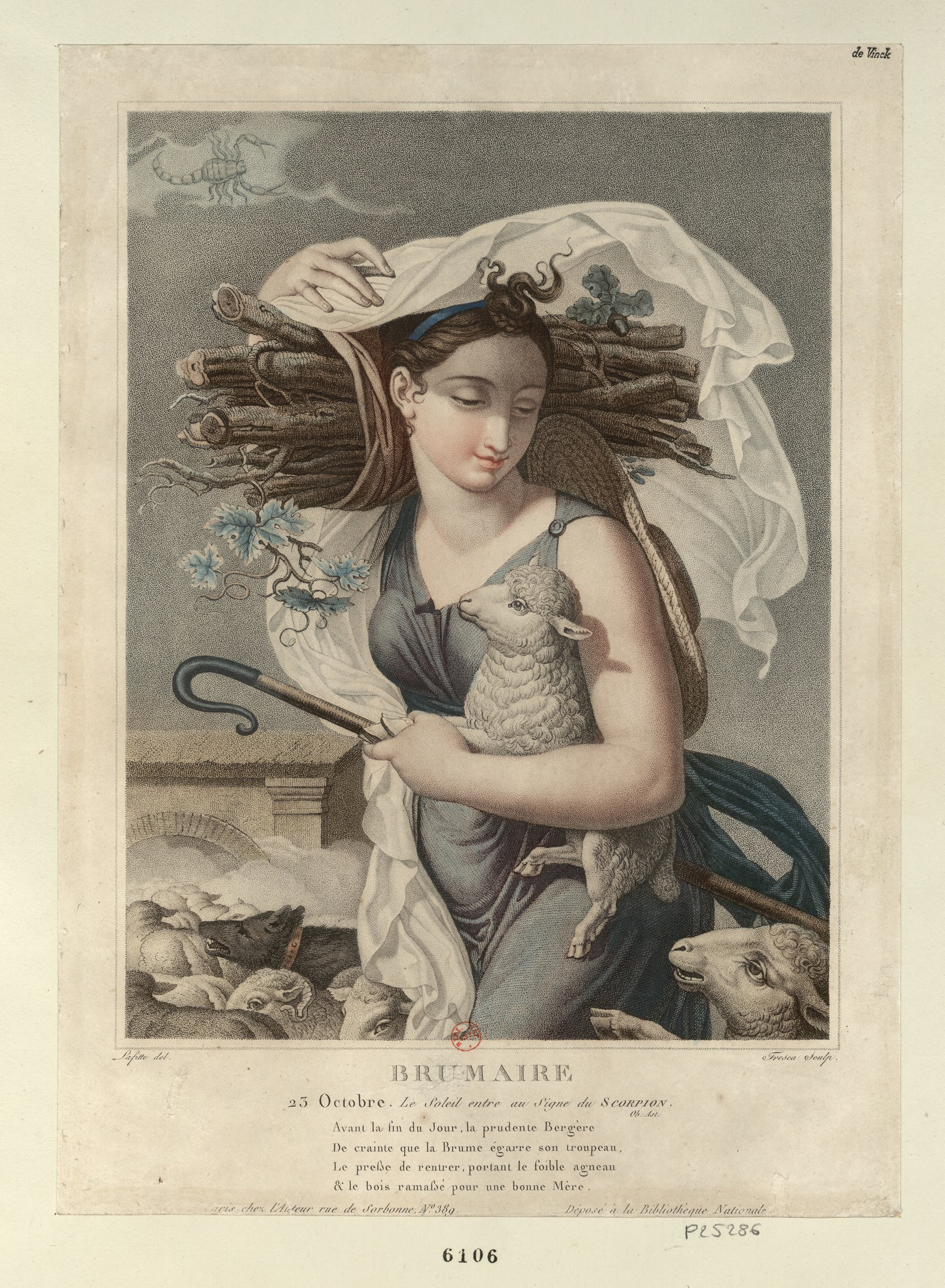
Brumaire

20:12:46
Time of day - 24 h/day
Greenwich

== References to the calendar ==
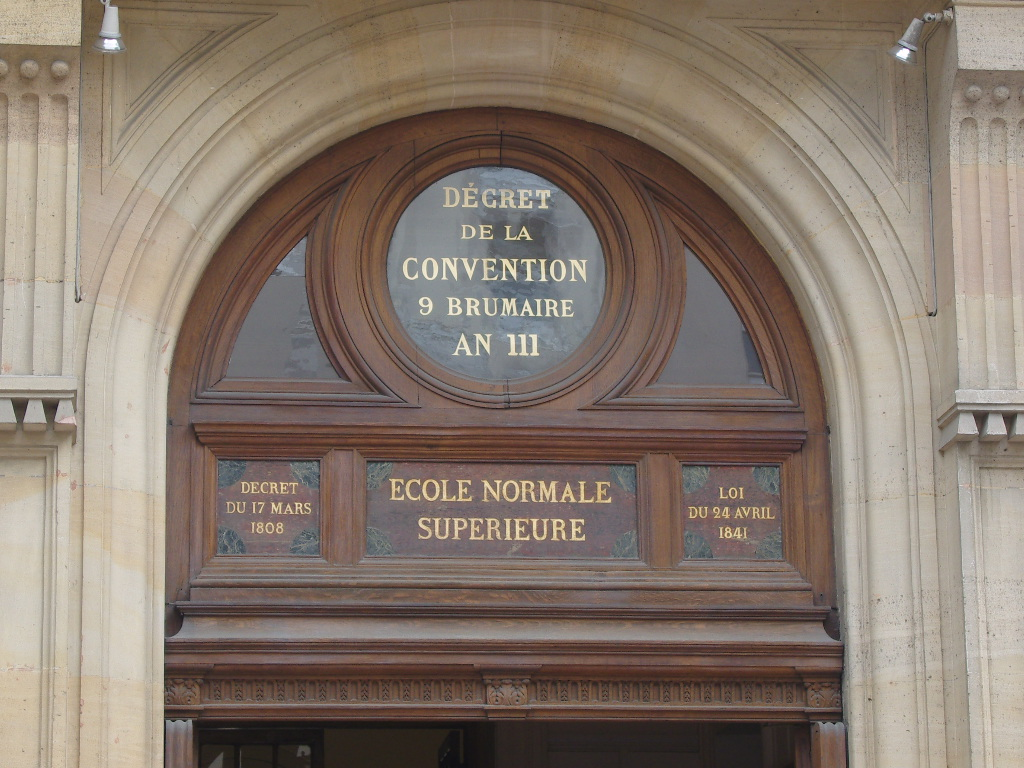
Décret de la Convention 9 Brumaire An III above the entrance to the ENS

The "Coup of 18 Brumaire" or "Brumaire" was the coup d'état of Napoleon Bonaparte on 18 Brumaire An VIII (9 November 1799), which many historians consider to be the end of the French Revolution. Karl Marx's 1852 essay The Eighteenth Brumaire of Louis Bonaparte compares the coup d'état of 1851 of Louis Napoléon unfavorably to his uncle's earlier coup, with the statement "History repeats ... first as tragedy, then as farce".

Another famous revolutionary date is 9 Thermidor An II (27 July 1794), the date the Convention turned against Maximilien Robespierre, who, along with others associated with the Mountain, was guillotined the following day.

Émile Zola's novel Germinal takes its name from the calendar's month of Germinal.

The seafood dish Lobster Thermidor was named after the 1891 play Thermidor, set during the Revolution.

The French frigates of the Floréal class all bear names of Republican months.

Most of the months in J. R. R. Tolkien's Númenórean Calendar are those of the Republican Calendar, translated into Elvish language.

In T Kingfisher's novel Illuminations, each chapter is set on a particular day and month, mostly in Thermidor, of the calendar. She explains her affection for the "delightful and rather absurd" calendar in the author's acknowledgements at the end of the book.

== See also ==
- Agricultural cycle – Annual cycle of crop growth/harvest activities
- Calendar reform – Significant revision of a calendar system
- Solar Hijri calendar – Astronomical equinox-based calendar used in Iran
- Republic of China calendar – Calendar used in Taiwan
- Soviet calendar – Calendar reforms in early 20th century Russia
- World Calendar – Proposed reform of Gregorian calendar
