= Aureimonas pseudogalii =

Scientific classification
- Domain: Bacteria
- Kingdom: Pseudomonadati
- Phylum: Pseudomonadota
- Class: Alphaproteobacteria
- Order: Hyphomicrobiales
- Family: Aurantimonadaceae
- Genus: Aureimonas
- Species: A. pseudogalii

Binomial name
- Aureimonas pseudogalii Aydogan et al. 2016

Species of bacterium

Aureimonas pseudogalii is a Gram-negative and rod-shaped bacteria from the genus Aureimonas which has been isolated from the phyllosphere of the plant Galium album.
