= Aureimonas frigidaquae =

Scientific classification
- Domain: Bacteria
- Kingdom: Pseudomonadati
- Phylum: Pseudomonadota
- Class: Alphaproteobacteria
- Order: Hyphomicrobiales
- Family: Aurantimonadaceae
- Genus: Aureimonas
- Species: A. frigidaquae

Binomial name
- Aureimonas frigidaquae Rathsack et al. 2011

Type strain
- S21B, LMG 23375, KCTC 22106, DSM 21988, CIP 109525, CECT 7138

Synonyms
- Aurantimonas kwangyangensis

Species of bacterium

Aureimonas frigidaquae is a Gram-negative, catalase- and oxidase-positive, facultatively anaerobic bacteria from the genus Aureimonas, which was isolated from a water-cooling system in Gwangyang in the Republic of Korea. Aurantimonas frigidaquae was reclassified to Aureimonas frigidaquae.
