= Aurantimonas aggregata =

Scientific classification
- Domain: Bacteria
- Kingdom: Pseudomonadati
- Phylum: Pseudomonadota
- Class: Alphaproteobacteria
- Order: Hyphomicrobiales
- Family: Aurantimonadaceae
- Genus: Aurantimonas
- Species: A. aggregata

Binomial name
- Aurantimonas aggregata Li et al. 2017

Type strain
- GDMCC 1.1202, KCTC 52919, R14M6

Species of bacterium

Aurantimonas aggregata is a Gram-negative, short-rod-shaped and aerobic bacteria from the genus of Aurantimonas which has been isolated from deep-sea sediments from the Ross Sea in the Antarctica.
