= Jiella aquimaris =

Scientific classification
- Domain: Bacteria
- Kingdom: Pseudomonadati
- Phylum: Pseudomonadota
- Class: Alphaproteobacteria
- Order: Hyphomicrobiales
- Family: Aurantimonadaceae
- Genus: Jiella
- Species: J. aquimaris

Binomial name
- Jiella aquimaris Liang et al. 2015

Type strain
- LZB041, JCM 30119, MCCC 1K00255

Species of bacterium

Jiella aquimaris is a Gram-negative, strictly aerobic, rod-shaped and motile from the genus of Jiella which has been isolated from seawater from the East China Sea.
