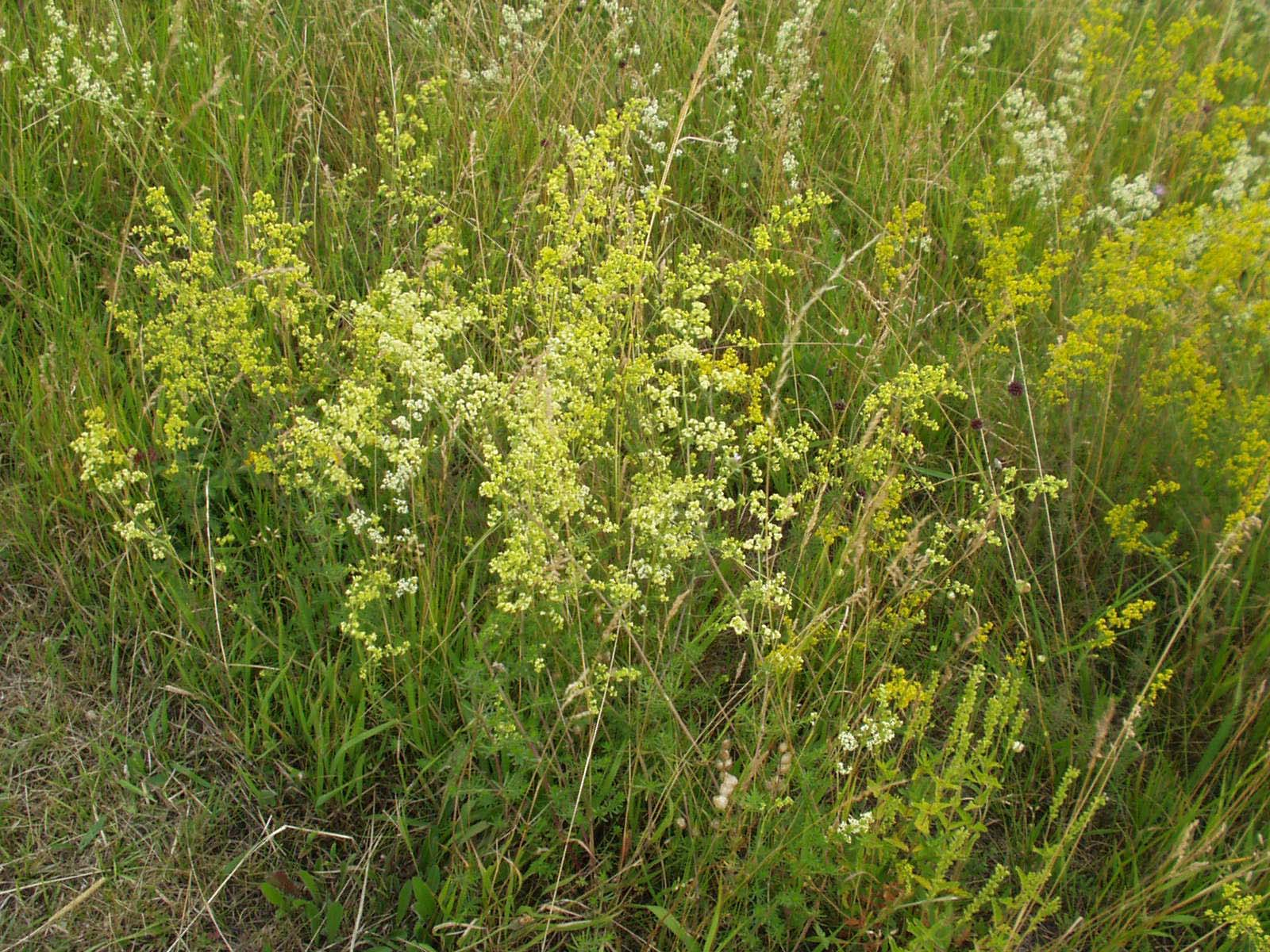

Scientific classification
- Kingdom: Plantae
- Clade: Tracheophytes
- Clade: Angiosperms
- Clade: Eudicots
- Clade: Asterids
- Order: Gentianales
- Family: Rubiaceae
- Genus: Galium
- Species: G. × pomeranicum

Binomial name
- Galium × pomeranicum Retz.

= Galium × pomeranicum =

Pomeranian bedstraw

Nothospecies of plant

Galium × pomeranicum is a species of plants in the family Rubiaceae, named for the region historically called Pomerania, now divided between Germany and Poland. The plant is apparently of hybrid origin, a cross between G. album × G. verum, though established in the wild. It is widespread across most of Europe and sparingly naturalized in a few locations in North America (New York, Massachusetts, Connecticut and New Brunswick).
