= Aureimonas ureilytica =

Scientific classification
- Domain: Bacteria
- Kingdom: Pseudomonadati
- Phylum: Pseudomonadota
- Class: Alphaproteobacteria
- Order: Hyphomicrobiales
- Family: Aurantimonadaceae
- Genus: Aureimonas
- Species: A. ureilytica

Binomial name
- Aureimonas ureilytica (Weon et al. 2007) Rathsack et al. 2011

Synonyms
- Aerobacter ureolyica; Aurantimonas ureilytica

Species of bacterium

Aureimonas ureilytica is a bacterium from the genus Aureimonas. Aurantimonas ureilytica was reclassified to Aureimonas ureilytica.
