= Aureimonas populi =

Scientific classification
- Domain: Bacteria
- Kingdom: Pseudomonadati
- Phylum: Pseudomonadota
- Class: Alphaproteobacteria
- Order: Hyphomicrobiales
- Family: Aurantimonadaceae
- Genus: Aureimonas
- Species: A. populi

Binomial name
- Aureimonas populi Li et al. 2018

Type strain
- 10-107-7, 4M3-2, CFCC 11187, KCTC 42087

Species of bacterium

Aureimonas populi is a Gram-negative, facultative aerobic and motil bacteria from the genus Aureimonas which has been isolated from the bark of a poplar tree.
