= Aureimonas endophytica =

Scientific classification
- Domain: Bacteria
- Kingdom: Pseudomonadati
- Phylum: Pseudomonadota
- Class: Alphaproteobacteria
- Order: Hyphomicrobiales
- Family: Aurantimonadaceae
- Genus: Aureimonas
- Species: A. endophytica

Binomial name
- Aureimonas endophytica Li et al. 2017

Type strain
- CGMCC 1.15367, KCTC 52217, 2T4P-2-4

Species of bacterium

Aureimonas endophytica is a Gram-negative, aerobic, coccoid rod-shaped and motile bacteria from the genus Aureimonas which has been isolated from the plant Aegiceras corniculatum from the Cotai Ecological Zones in China.
