= Aureimonas jatrophae =

Scientific classification
- Domain: Bacteria
- Kingdom: Pseudomonadati
- Phylum: Pseudomonadota
- Class: Alphaproteobacteria
- Order: Hyphomicrobiales
- Family: Aurantimonadaceae
- Genus: Aureimonas
- Species: A. jatrophae

Binomial name
- Aureimonas jatrophae Madhaiyan et al. 2013

Type strain
- L7-484, KACC 16230, DSM 25025

Species of bacterium

Aureimonas jatrophae is a bacterium from the genus Aureimonas which was isolated from the plant Jatropha curcas Linnaeus in the Agrotechnology Experimental Station of Lim Chu Kang in Singapore.
