= Aurantimonas manganoxydans =

Scientific classification
- Domain: Bacteria
- Kingdom: Pseudomonadati
- Phylum: Pseudomonadota
- Class: Alphaproteobacteria
- Order: Hyphomicrobiales
- Family: Aurantimonadaceae
- Genus: Aurantimonas
- Species: A. manganoxydans

Binomial name
- Aurantimonas manganoxydans Anderson et al. 2011

Type strain
- ATCC BAA-1229, DSM 21871, SI85-9A1

Species of bacterium

Aurantimonas manganoxydans is a Gram-negative, catalase- and oxidase-positive, non-spore-forming, motile bacteria from the genus of Aurantimonas which has the ability to oxidize Manganese. Aurantimonas manganoxydans was isolated from coastal water from Oregon in the United States.
