= Fulvimarina manganoxydans =

Scientific classification
- Domain: Bacteria
- Kingdom: Pseudomonadati
- Phylum: Pseudomonadota
- Class: Alphaproteobacteria
- Order: Hyphomicrobiales
- Family: Aurantimonadaceae
- Genus: Fulvimarina
- Species: F. manganoxydans

Binomial name
- Fulvimarina manganoxydans Ren et al. 2014

Type strain
- CGMCC1.10972, JCM 18890, strain 8047

Species of bacterium

Fulvimarina manganoxydans is a Gram-negative and aerobic bacteria from the genus of Fulvimarina which has been isolated from a Hydrothermal vent from the Indian Ocean.
