= Aureimonas glaciei =

Scientific classification
- Domain: Bacteria
- Kingdom: Pseudomonadati
- Phylum: Pseudomonadota
- Class: Alphaproteobacteria
- Order: Hyphomicrobiales
- Family: Aurantimonadaceae
- Genus: Aureimonas
- Species: A. glaciei

Binomial name
- Aureimonas glaciei Guo et al. 2017

Type strain
- CGMCC 1.15493, KCTC 52395, strain B5-2

Species of bacterium

Aureimonas glaciei is a Gram-negative, aerobic, short rod-shaped and motile bacteria from the genus Aureimonas which has been isolated from the Muztagh Glacier in China.
