= Phyllosphaerae =

Phyllosphaerae may refer to:

- Aureimonas phyllosphaerae, species of bacteria
- Duganella phyllosphaerae, species of bacteria
- Methylobacterium phyllosphaerae, species of bacteria
- Microbacterium phyllosphaerae, species of bacteria
- Sphingomonas phyllosphaerae, species of bacteria
