= Aureimonas ferruginea =

Scientific classification
- Domain: Bacteria
- Kingdom: Pseudomonadati
- Phylum: Pseudomonadota
- Class: Alphaproteobacteria
- Order: Hyphomicrobiales
- Family: Aurantimonadaceae
- Genus: Aureimonas
- Species: A. ferruginea

Binomial name
- Aureimonas ferruginea Lin et al. 2013

Type strain
- BCRC 80439, CC-CFT023, JCM 18444

Species of bacterium

Aureimonas ferruginea is a catalase- and oxidase-positive bacteria from the genus Aureimonas which was isolated from a rusty iron plate.
