= Jiella glaciistagni =

Scientific classification
- Domain: Bacteria
- Kingdom: Pseudomonadati
- Phylum: Pseudomonadota
- Class: Alphaproteobacteria
- Order: Hyphomicrobiales
- Family: Aurantimonadaceae
- Genus: Aureimonas
- Species: A. glaciistagni

Binomial name
- Aureimonas glaciistagni Cho et al. 2015

Type strain
- JCM 30183, KCCM 43049, PAMC 27157

Species of bacterium

Aureimonas glaciistagni is a Gram-negative, rod-shaped, aerobic and motile bacteria from the genus Aureimonas which has been isolated from a melt pond from Arctic sea ice.
