= Aurantimonas =

Scientific classification
- Domain: Bacteria
- Kingdom: Pseudomonadati
- Phylum: Pseudomonadota
- Class: Alphaproteobacteria
- Order: Hyphomicrobiales
- Family: Aurantimonadaceae
- Genus: Aurantimonas; Denner et al. 2003

Type species
- Aurantimonas coralicida

Species
- A. aggregata A. altamirensis A. coralicida A. endophytica A. litoralis A. manganoxydans

Genus of bacteria

Aurantimonas is a genus of bacteria from the family of Aurantimonadaceae.
