= Aureimonas rubiginis =

Scientific classification
- Domain: Bacteria
- Kingdom: Pseudomonadati
- Phylum: Pseudomonadota
- Class: Alphaproteobacteria
- Order: Hyphomicrobiales
- Family: Aurantimonadaceae
- Genus: Aureimonas
- Species: A. rubiginis

Binomial name
- Aureimonas rubiginis Lin et al. 2013

Species of bacterium

Aureimonas rubiginis is a bacterium from the genus Aureimonas which was isolated from a rusty iron plate.
