= Aurantimonas endophytica =

Scientific classification
- Domain: Bacteria
- Kingdom: Pseudomonadati
- Phylum: Pseudomonadota
- Class: Alphaproteobacteria
- Order: Hyphomicrobiales
- Family: Aurantimonadaceae
- Genus: Aurantimonas
- Species: A. endophytica

Binomial name
- Aurantimonas endophytica Liu et al. 2016

Type strain
- CPCC 100904, KCTC 52296, EGI 6500337

Species of bacterium

Aurantimonas endophytica is a short-rod-shaped, aerobic and motile bacteria from the genus of Aurantimonas which has been isolated from the roots of the plant Anabasis elatior in Urumqi in China.
