= Aurantimonas litoralis =

Scientific classification
- Domain: Bacteria
- Kingdom: Pseudomonadati
- Phylum: Pseudomonadota
- Class: Alphaproteobacteria
- Order: Hyphomicrobiales
- Family: Aurantimonadaceae
- Genus: Aurantimonas
- Species: A. litoralis

Binomial name
- Aurantimonas litoralis Anderson et al. 2009

Type strain
- HTCC 2156, KCTC 12094, ATCC BAA-667

Species of bacterium

Aurantimonas litoralis is a Gram-negative, catalase- and oxidase-positive, non-motile bacteria from the genus of Aurantimonas which was isolated from coastal water from Oregon in the United States.
