= Aureimonas altamirensis =

Scientific classification
- Domain: Bacteria
- Kingdom: Pseudomonadati
- Phylum: Pseudomonadota
- Class: Alphaproteobacteria
- Order: Hyphomicrobiales
- Family: Aurantimonadaceae
- Genus: Aureimonas
- Species: A. altamirensis

Binomial name
- Aureimonas altamirensis Rathsack et al. 2011

Type strain
- CECT 7138, CIP 109525, DSM 21988, KCTC 22106, LMG 23375, S21B

Synonyms
- Aurantimonas altamirensis

Species of bacterium

Aureimonas altamirensis is a Gram-negative, catalase- and oxidase-positive, non-motile bacteria from the genus Aureimonas which was isolated from Altamira Cave in Cantabria in Spain. Aurantimonas altamirensis was reclassified to Aureimonas altamirensis.
