= Jiella (bacterium) =

Scientific classification
- Domain: Bacteria
- Kingdom: Pseudomonadati
- Phylum: Pseudomonadota
- Class: Alphaproteobacteria
- Order: Hyphomicrobiales
- Family: Aurantimonadaceae
- Genus: Jiella; Liang et al. 2015

Type species
- Jiella aquimaris

Species
- J. aquimaris

Genus of bacteria

Jiella is a genus of bacteria from the family of Aurantimonadaceae with one known species (Jiella aquimaris).
