= Fulvimarina =

Scientific classification
- Domain: Bacteria
- Kingdom: Pseudomonadati
- Phylum: Pseudomonadota
- Class: Alphaproteobacteria
- Order: Hyphomicrobiales
- Family: Aurantimonadaceae
- Genus: Fulvimarina; Cho and Giovannoni 2003

Type species
- Fulvimarina pelagi

Species
- F. manganoxydans F. pelagi

Genus of bacteria

Fulvimarina is a genus of bacteria from the family of Aurantimonadaceae.
