= Fulvimarina pelagi =

Scientific classification
- Domain: Bacteria
- Kingdom: Pseudomonadati
- Phylum: Pseudomonadota
- Class: Alphaproteobacteria
- Order: Hyphomicrobiales
- Family: Aurantimonadaceae
- Genus: Fulvimarina
- Species: F. pelagi

Binomial name
- Fulvimarina pelagi Cho and Giovannoni 2003

Type strain
- ATCC BAA-666, CCUG 52903, CIP 108376, DSM 15513, HTCC 2506, KCTC 12091

Species of bacterium

Fulvimarina pelagi is a Gram-negative, strictly aerobic, non-motile bacteria from the genus of Fulvimarina which was isolated from sea water from the western Sargasso Sea.
