= Aureimonas phyllosphaerae =

Scientific classification
- Domain: Bacteria
- Kingdom: Pseudomonadati
- Phylum: Pseudomonadota
- Class: Alphaproteobacteria
- Order: Hyphomicrobiales
- Family: Aurantimonadaceae
- Genus: Aureimonas
- Species: A. phyllosphaerae

Binomial name
- Aureimonas phyllosphaerae Madhaiyan et al. 2013

Type strain
- L9-753, L7-479, L7-456, KACC 16231, DSM 25026

Species of bacterium

Aureimonas phyllosphaerae is a bacterium from the genus Aureimonas which was isolated from the plant Jatropha curcas from an agrotechnology experimental station in Lim Chu Kang in Singapore.
