= Aureimonas =

Scientific classification
- Domain: Bacteria
- Kingdom: Pseudomonadati
- Phylum: Pseudomonadota
- Class: Alphaproteobacteria
- Order: Hyphomicrobiales
- Family: Aurantimonadaceae
- Genus: Aureimonas; Rathsack et al. 2011

Type species
- Aureimonas altamirensis

Species
- Aureimonas altamirensis; Aureimonas endophytica; Aureimonas ferruginea; Aureimonas frigidaquae; Aureimonas galii; Aureimonas glaciei; Aureimonas glaciistagni; Aureimonas jatrophae; Aureimonas phyllosphaerae; Aureimonas populi; Aureimonas pseudogalii; Aureimonas rubiginis; Aureimonas ureilytica

Genus of bacteria

Aureimonas is a genus of marine bacteria from the family Aurantimonadaceae.
