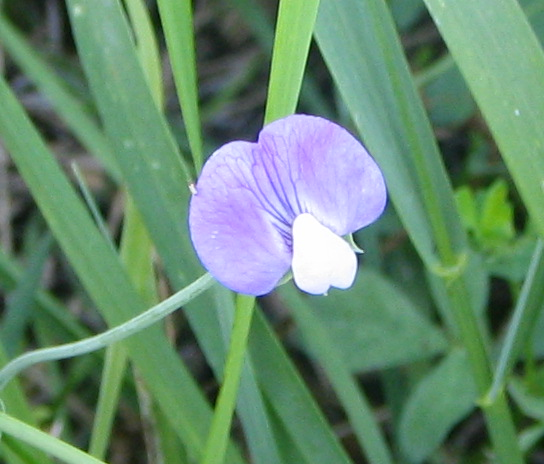

Conservation status
- Least Concern (IUCN 3.1)

Scientific classification
- Kingdom: Plantae
- Clade: Tracheophytes
- Clade: Angiosperms
- Clade: Eudicots
- Clade: Rosids
- Order: Fabales
- Family: Fabaceae
- Subfamily: Faboideae
- Genus: Lathyrus
- Species: L. hirsutus

Binomial name
- Lathyrus hirsutus L.

Synonyms
- Lastila hirsuta (L.) Alef.; Lathyrus cicer Hablitz; Lathyrus coerulescens Boiss. & Reut.; Lathyrus hirtus Lam.; Lathyrus leptophyllus K.Koch ex Boiss.; Lathyrus variegatus Host; Orobus glabratus Nyman; Orobus lathyroides Hablitz; Pisum hirsutum (L.) E.H.L.Krause

= Lathyrus hirsutus =

Species of plant

Lathyrus hirsutus is a species of wild pea known by several common names, including Caley pea, singletary pea, hairy vetchling, and Austrian winter pea. It is native to Europe, North Africa, and much of Asia, and it is known from other continents, including North America, as an introduced species. This is an annual herb producing a winged stem and leaves each made up of two leaflike leaflets with a branching, coiled tendril. The inflorescence holds one or two pink, blue, or bicolored pea flowers each 1 to 1.5 centimeters wide. The fruit is a dehiscent legume pod covered in hairs with each hair growing from a minute bulbous base. The rest of the plant is generally hairless.

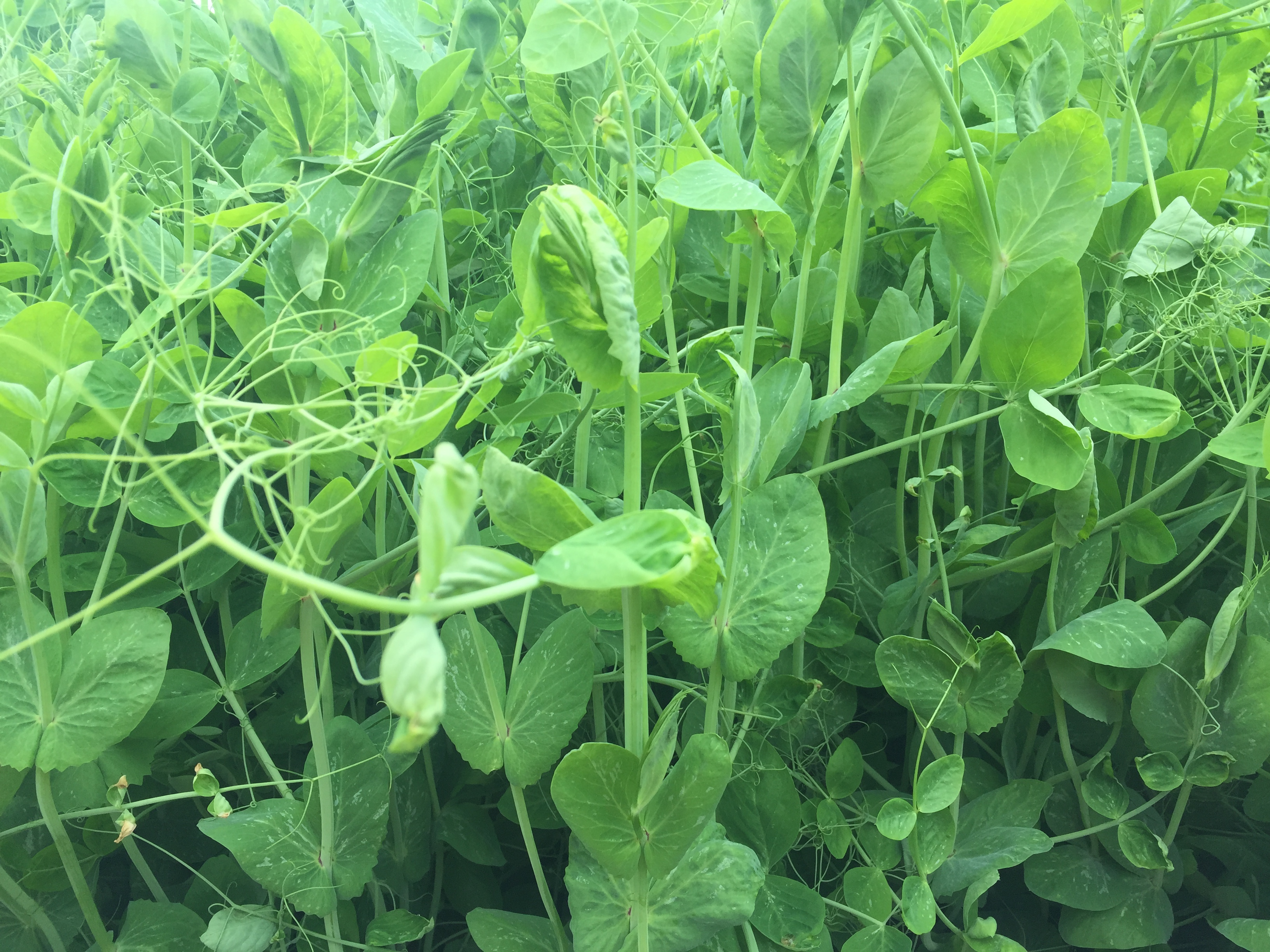
Lathyrus hirsutus sown September 2014 in the UBC Botanical Garden.
