= Grafter =

Garden tool

Grafter, German engraving of 1855 (Pomologische Monatshefte)

A grafter, or grafting knife, is a garden tool used for grafting fruit trees. The grafter is usually in the form of a small knife made of thin metal. The blade of a grafting knife is beveled, or curved, on one side and flat on the other so that the knife can cut easily through wood with a flat cut that provides the most contact possible in the finished graft. Grafting knives should be sharpened after every use.
