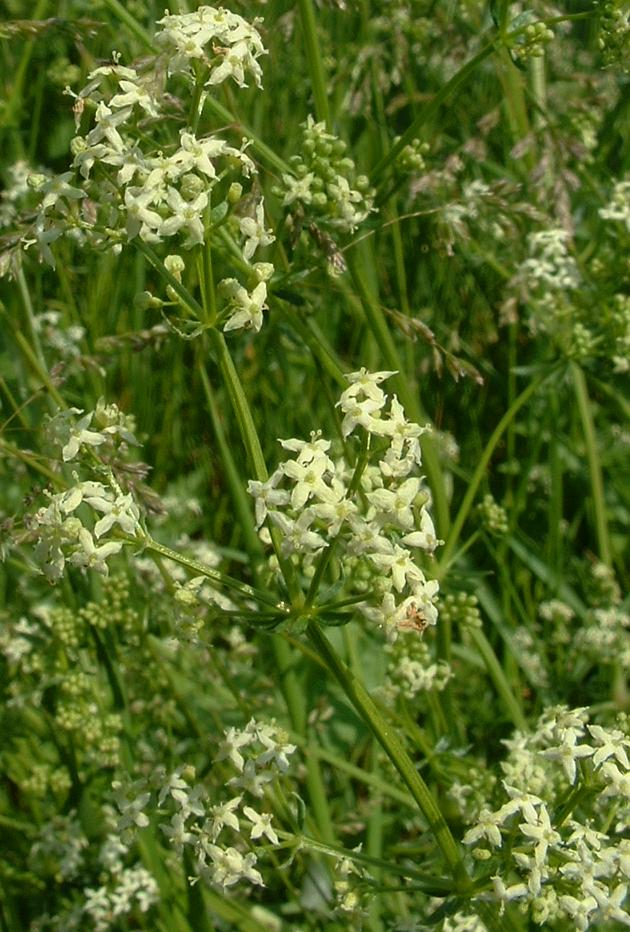

Conservation status
- Unranked (NatureServe)

Scientific classification
- Kingdom: Plantae
- Clade: Tracheophytes
- Clade: Angiosperms
- Clade: Eudicots
- Clade: Asterids
- Order: Gentianales
- Family: Rubiaceae
- Genus: Galium
- Species: G. album

Binomial name
- Galium album Mill.

Subspecies
- See text

Synonyms
- Species: Galium mollugo subsp. album (Mill.) Tzvelev; Subspecies G. album subsp. album: Galium album var. praticola (Heinr.Braun) Michalk.; Galium dumetorum Jord.; Galium elatum var. dumetorum (Jord.) Rouy; Galium elatum subsp. erectum Berher; Galium erectum Huds., nom. illeg.; Galium erectum var. alpinum Timb.-Lagr.; Galium gerardi var. hosmariense Pau, nom. nud.; Galium gerardi var. parviflorum Pau; Galium lucidum var. guilhelmi Pau & Sennen; Galium mixtum Stranski; Galium mollugo var. alpinum (Timb.-Lagr.) Lange; Galium mollugo var. dumetorum (Jord.) Corb.; Galium mollugo subsp. dumetorum (Jord.) Briq.; Galium mollugo subsp. erectum Syme, nom. illeg.; Galium mollugo var. erectum Asch.; Galium mollugo var. guilhelmii (Pau & Sennen) Maire; Galium mollugo var. hosmariense Pau ex Maire; Galium mollugo var. mixtum (Stranski) Stoj. & Stef.; Galium mollugo var. nevadense Lange in M.Willkomm & J.M.C.Lange; Galium mollugo var. parviflorum (Pau) Maire; Galium mollugo var. praticola Heinr.Braun; Galium sphenophyllum Klokov; Galium sylvestre Scop.; Galium sylvestre subsp. mollugo Gaudin; G. album subsp. prusense: Galium prusense K.Koch; Galium fagetorum Klokov; Galium fasciculatum Klokov; Galium juzepczukii Pobed.; Galium mollugo var. anatolicum K.Koch; Galium zelenetzkii Klokov; G. album subsp. pycnotrichum: Galium mollugo f. pycnotrichum Heinr.Braun; Galium mollugo subsp. pycnotrichum (Heinr.Braun) O.Schwarz; Galium pycnotrichum (Heinr.Braun) Borbás; Galium album var. petraeum (Schur) Soó, nom. illeg.; Galium album f. pubescens (Schrad.) Ancev; Galium firmum var. euboeum Halácsy; Galium mollugo var. petraeum Schur; Galium mollugo var. pubescens Schrad.; G. album subsp. suberectum: Galium suberectum Klokov

= Galium album =

Species of plant

Galium album, common names white bedstraw and upright hedge bedstraw, is an annual, herbaceous plant of the family Rubiaceae and is native to much of Europe.

== Description ==
The stems can grow to at least 150 centimetres (5 feet) and are more or less erect with ascending branches. The stem is square in sections with slight flanges. The plant is relatively hairless with shiny leaves and stem. Flowers are white or yellowish. The fruits are hairless.

== Distribution and habitat ==
Galium album is widespread over much of Europe, native to a large region from Britain to Morocco, east to Turkey and Western Siberia. It has been introduced and is naturalized in Ireland, Scandinavia, Greenland and South Australia. It is found in pastures and grassy banks, especially on dry calcareous soils. In Britain, G. album is local in lowland England, rare in the north, and very rare in Scotland.

== Subspecies ==
Five subspecies were accepted by Plants of the World Online as of December 2024, listed here with their native distributions:

- Galium album subsp. album – most of the range of the species
- Galium album subsp. amani Ehrend. & Schönb.-Tem. – parts of Lebanon, Syria, and Turkey
- Galium album subsp. prusense (K.Koch) Ehrend. & Krendl – Greece, Bulgaria, Crimea, Turkey, and Caucasus
- Galium album subsp. pycnotrichum (Heinr.Braun) Krendl – from Poland south to Greece and Turkey
- Galium album subsp. suberectum (Klokov) Michalk. – Carpathian Mountains of western Ukraine
