= Aurantimonadaceae =

Scientific classification
- Domain: Bacteria
- Kingdom: Pseudomonadati
- Phylum: Pseudomonadota
- Class: Alphaproteobacteria
- Order: Hyphomicrobiales
- Family: Aurantimonadaceae; Hördt et al. 2020

Genera
- Aurantimonas Denner et al. 2003; Aureimonas Rathsack et al. 2011; Consotaella Díaz-Cárdenas et al. 2017; Fulvimarina Cho and Giovannoni 2003; Jiella Liang et al. 2015; Mangrovicella Li et al. 2018

Synonyms
- "Aurantimonadaceae" Denner et al. 2003

Family of bacteria

Aurantimonadaceae is a small family of marine bacteria.

== Notable Species ==
Aurantimonas coralicida causes a white plague in corals.

Fulvimarina pelagi was isolated from seawater, and takes the form of nonmotile rods. Fulvimarina pelagi is an obligate aerobe, and obtains its nourishment chemoheterotrophically. It tests positive for oxidase and catalase, and contains carotenoid pigments, possibly to protect against solar radiation.

== Etymology ==
The name Aurantimonas derives from: Neo-Latin aurantus, orange-coloured; Greek monas (μονάς), a unit; to mean an orange-coloured unicellular organism.

Members of the genus Aurantimonas can be referred to as aurantimonads (viz. trivialisation of names).

== Phylogeny ==
The currently accepted taxonomy is based on the List of Prokaryotic names with Standing in Nomenclature (LPSN). The phylogeny is based on whole-genome analysis.

- - Aurantimonadaceae
    - Aureimonas
    - - - Mangrovicella
        - Consotaella
      - - Fulvimarina
        - - Jiella
          - Aurantimonas
  - outgroup
    Devosiaceae
