= List of Michigan flowers =

This is a list of plants that are native to the U.S. state of Michigan.

== A ==
- Acalypha rhomboidea, Rhombic copperleaf
- Acalypha virginica, Virginia copperleaf
- Acorus americanus, American sweet-flag
- Amaranthus arenicola, Sandhill amaranth
- Amaranthus retroflexus, Rough pigweed
- Ambrosia artemisiifolia, Common ragweed
- Ambrosia trifida, Giant ragweed
- Anchusa officinalis, Common bugloss
- Andersonglossum virginianum, Blue hound's-tongue
- Aplectrum hyemale, Putty-root
- Aquilegia canadensis, Wild columbine
- Arisaema dracontium, Green dragon
- Arisaema triphyllum, Jack-in-the-pulpit
- Aristolochia macrophylla, Dutchman's pipe
- Aristolochia serpentaria, Virginia snakeroot
- Artemisia campestris, Field sagewort
- Artemisia vulgaris, Mugwort
- Asarum canadense, Wild ginger
- Asclepias viridiflora, Green milkweed
- Atriplex littoralis, Grass-leaved orache
- Atriplex patula, Halberd-leaved orache
- Atriplex prostrata, Triangle orache

== B ==
- Barbarea vulgaris, Bittercress
- Bassia scoparia, Summer cypress
- Boehmeria cylindrica, False nettle

== C ==
- Cakile edentula, Sea-rocket
- Campanula aparinoides, Marsh bellflower
- Campanula glomerata, Clustered bellflower
- Campanula rapunculoides, Creeping bellflower
- Campanula rotundifolia, Harebell
- Campanula trachelium, Nettle-leaved bellflower
- Campanulastrum americanum, Tall bellflower
- Caulophyllum thalictroides, Blue cohosh
- Chaenorhinum minus, Lesser toadflax
- Chenopodium album, Lamb's quarters
- Chamaesyce polygonifolia, Seaside spurge
- Coeloglossum viride, Frog orchid
- Commelina communis, Common Dayflower
- Commelina erecta, Erect dayflower
- Cypripedium acaule, Pink lady's slipper

== D ==
- Dioscorea villosa, Wild yam
- Dysphania ambrosioides, Mexican-tea
- Dysphania atriplicifolia, Winged pigweed

== E ==
- Echium vulgare, Viper's bugloss
- Epifagus virginiana, Beech-drops
- Euphorbia cyparissias, Cypress spurge
- Euphorbia esula, Leafy spurge
- Euphorbia commutata, Tinted spurge

== F ==
- Floerkea proserpinacoides, False mermaid
- Fragaria virginiana, Virginia strawberry

== G ==
- Galium circaezans, Forest bedstraw
- Galium odoratum, Sweet woodruff
- Gentiana andrewsii, Prairie closed gentian
- Gentiana puberulenta, Prairie gentian
- Gentiana saponaria, Soapwort gentian
- Gentianopsis crinita, Greater fringed gentian

== H ==
- Humulus lupulus, Common hops
- Hybanthus concolor, Green violet

== L ==
- Lappula squarrosa, Stickseed
- Lechea mucronata, Hairy pinweed
- Linum perenne, Blue flax
- Liparis liliifolia, Large twayblade
- Lithospermum caroliniense, Carolina puccoon
- Ludwigia palustris, Water purslane

== M ==
- Maianthemum stellatum, Starry false Solomon's seal
- Malaxis monophyllos, White adder's-tongue
- Mertensia paniculata, Northern bluebell
- Mertensia virginica, Virginia bluebell
- Mitella nuda, Naked mitrewort
- Myosotis arvensis, Field forget-me-not
- Myosotis discolor, Changing Forget-me-not
- Myosotis laxa, Small forget-me-not
- Myosotis scorpioides, True forget-me-not
- Myosotis stricta, Strict forget-me-not
- Myosotis sylvatica, Garden forget-me-not
- Myriophyllum heterophyllum, Water-milfoil

== N ==
- Neottia auriculata, Auricled twayblade
- Neottia cordata, Heart-leaved twayblade

== P ==
- Parietaria pensylvanica, Pellitory
- Peltandra virginica, Arrow-arum
- Phlox divaricata, Wild blue phlox
- Platanthera aquilonis, Tall northern bog-orchid
- Platanthera clavellata, Green woodland orchid
- Platanthera flava, Tubercled orchid
- Platanthera hookeri, Hooker's orchid
- Platanthera lacera, Ragged fringed orchid
- Polygonatum biflorum, Smooth Solomon's seal
- Polygonatum pubescens, Hairy Solomon's seal
- Potamogeton crispus, Curled pondweed
- Potamogeton diversifolius, Common snailseed pondweed
- Potamogeton epihydrus, Ribbon-leaved pondweed
- Potamogeton gramineus, Variable pondweed
- Potamogeton natans, Floating pondweed
- Potentilla indica, Mock strawberry
- Proserpinaca palustris, Common mermaid-weed
- Pterospora andromedea, Pine-drops

== R ==
- Rumex acetosella, Sheep's sorrel
- Rumex crispus, Curled dock
- Rumex obtusifolius, Bitter dock
- Rumex verticillatus, Water dock

== S ==
- Scleranthus annuus, Knawel
- Scrophularia lanceolata, American figwort
- Scrophularia marilandica, Eastern figwort
- Silene latifolia, White campion
- Smilax herbacea, Carrion-flower
- Smilax rotundifolia, Common greenbriar
- Stuckenia pectinata, Sago pondweed
- Symplocarpus foetidus, Eastern skunk cabbage

== T ==
- Taraxacum officinale, Common dandelion
- Tradescantia bracteata, Sticky spiderwort
- Tradescantia ohiensis, Smooth spiderwort
- Tradescantia virginiana, Virginia spiderwort
- Triodanis perfoliata, Venus's looking-glass
- Trillium recurvatum, Prairie trillium
- Trillium sessile, Toad trillium

== U ==
- Urtica dioica, Stinging nettle

== V ==
- Vicia cracca, Tufted vetch
- Vincetoxicum nigrum, Black swallow-wort
- Viola adunca, Hook-spurred violet
- Viola bicolor, Wild pansy
- Viola labradorica, American dog violet
- Viola rostrata, Long-spurred violet
- Viola tricolor, Johnny-jump-up

== X ==
- Xanthium strumarium, Common cocklebur
