= Galium proliferum =

Scientific classification
- Kingdom: Plantae
- Clade: Tracheophytes
- Clade: Angiosperms
- Clade: Eudicots
- Clade: Asterids
- Order: Gentianales
- Family: Rubiaceae
- Genus: Galium
- Species: G. proliferum

Binomial name
- Galium proliferum A.Gray

Synonyms
- Galium virgatum var. diffusum A.Gray; Galium proliferum var. subnudum Greenm.

Species of plant

Galium proliferum, also known as limestone bedstraw, is a species of plant in the Rubiaceae family. It is native to Northeastern Mexico and the Southeastern United States. More specifically, it can be found in American states California (San Diego and San Bernardino County), southern Nevada (Clark County), southern Utah (Kane and Washington County), Arizona, New Mexico, Texas, as well as the Mexican states Coahuila and Nuevo León.

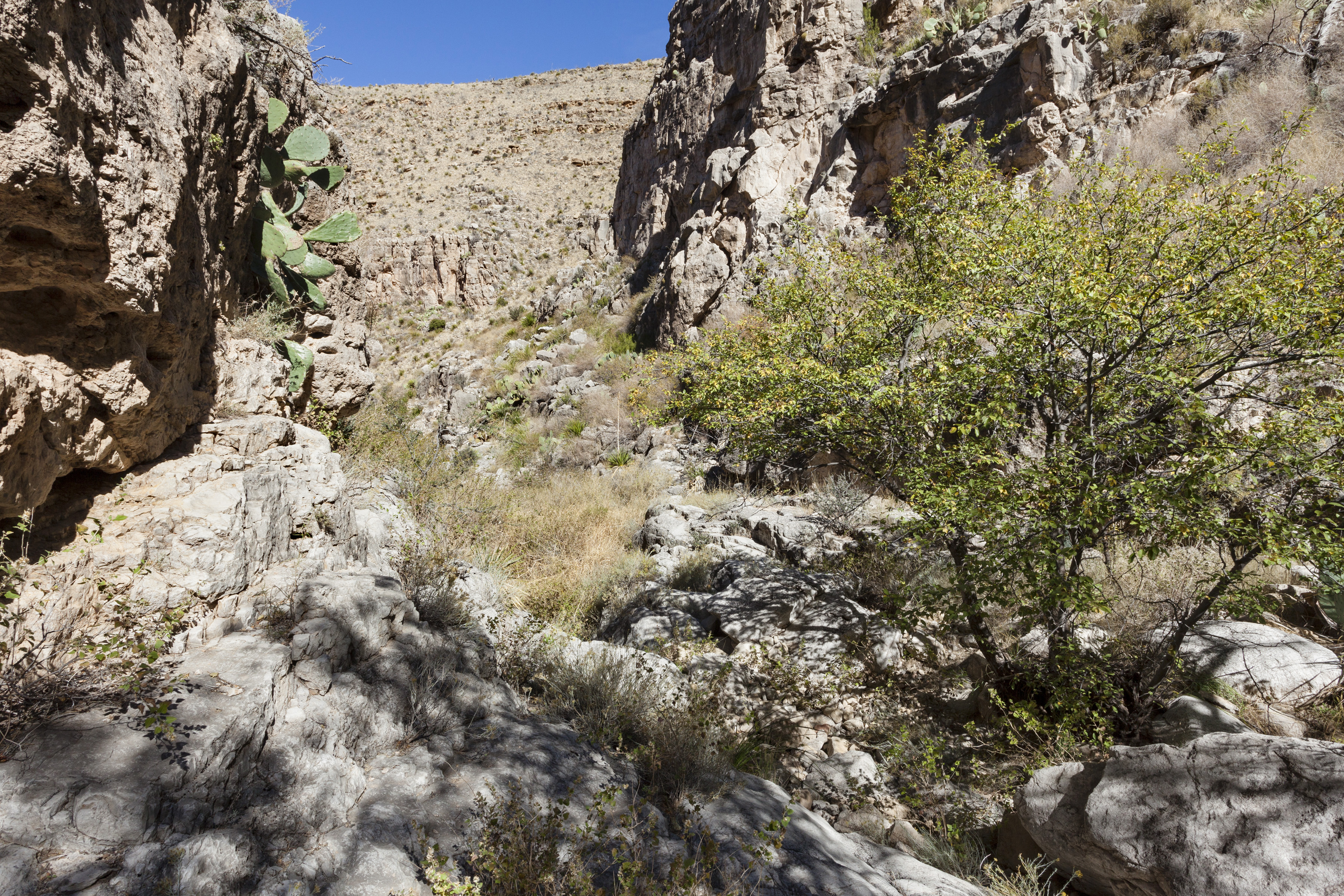
Natural habitat of Galium proliferum in the Western Guadalupe Mountains, Sevenshooter Canyon, New Mexico, USA

== Phylogeny ==
It is the sister group to Galium virgatum. It is also closely related to Galium texense and Galium circaezans, as can be seen in the following cladogram:

- - - - Galium proliferum
      - Galium virgatum
    - Galium texense
  - Galium circaezans
