= Apple Island (Michigan) =

Archaeological site in Michigan, United States

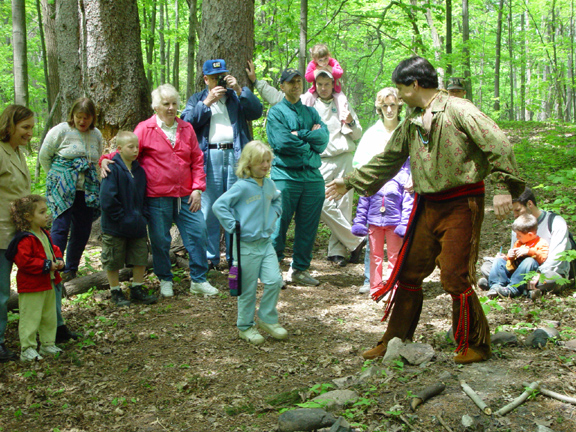
- Métis reenactor on Apple Island

- Location within Michigan

Geography
- Location: Orchard Lake
- Coordinates: 42°35′21″N 83°22′18″W
- Area: 0.14 km^{2} (0.054 sq mi)

Administration
- United States
- State: Michigan
- County: Oakland County
- City: Orchard Lake Village

Demographics
- Population: Uninhabited
- Ethnic groups
- Apple Island Historical Archaeological Site
- U.S. National Register of Historic Places
- NRHP reference No.: 100002685
- Added to NRHP: July 20, 2018

Apple Island is a 35-acre (140,000 m^{2}) island that lies in the middle of Orchard Lake, in Orchard Lake Village, Michigan. The island was formed during the region's last ice age, 10,000 to 12,000 years ago. Over 400 species of flora currently inhabit the island, including many rare varieties in Oakland County. Native Americans previously inhabited Apple Island, until ceding the island to the United States in the Treaty of Detroit. Currently, the West Bloomfield School District uses the island as an educational nature center.

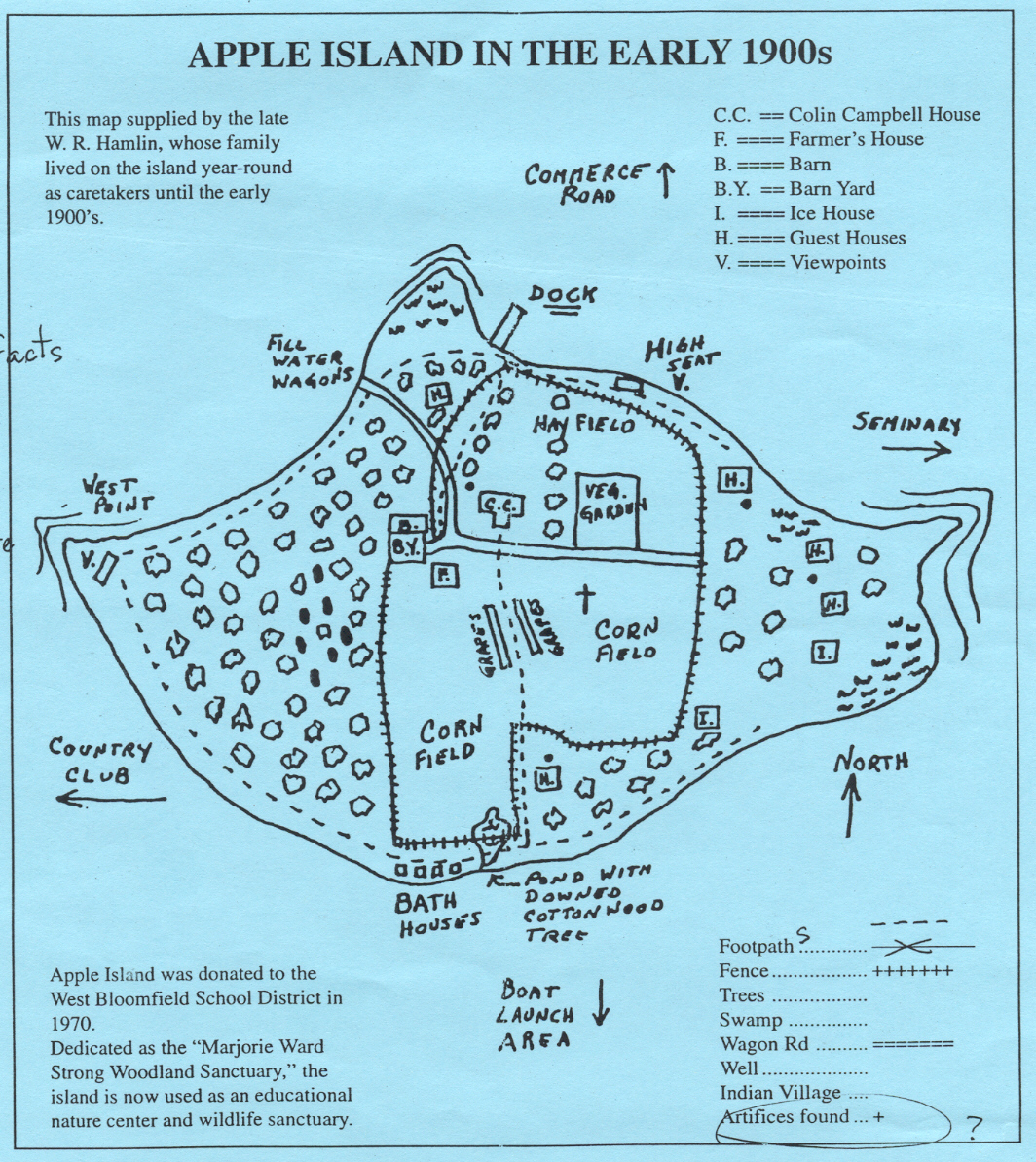
Apple Island, Orchard Lake, Michigan

== Topography ==
Apple Island is a 35-acre (140,000 m^{2}) island, spanning three-eighths of a mile in length and a quarter of a mile in width. The island's highest point is 960 feet (290 m) in elevation, approximately 31 feet (9.4 m) above the normal elevation of Orchard Lake. The island's formation traces back to the recession of the region's last ice age glacier 10,000 to 12,000 years ago.

Apple Island Sanctuary contains examples of every type of ecological system identified within the southeastern Michigan region. Over 400 species of flora live upon the island, including many rare varieties in Oakland County.

== Archaeology ==
In the 1930s an Apple Island resident discovered a French-made spun pewter bowl while plowing his cornfield. The bowl was filled with wampum, and was constructed in the late 18th century or early 19th century. The bowl was probably a gift from the French to the Native Americans. The Cranbrook Collection currently houses the artifact.

Several one-meter-square test pits dug on the west side of the island in 1997 yielded pottery and stone tools. No evidence however exists that pottery production ever occurred on the island, nor is there a local source of flint or other stone suitable for the manufacturing of tools. Accordingly, these items were most likely brought to the island. These artifacts signal the influence of early Europeans on the area's native population. Many of these silver trade items were recovered during archaeological excavations on the island in June 2000. A third dig conducted in August 2008 concluded that, "[i]t is currently impossible to determine how often or for how long the site was occupied by American Indians or exactly when this may have occurred. It is most likely that the site area was one of the many local archaeological sites various American Indian groups used casually and ephemerally during the 15th or 16th or even the early 17th century and then occupied again, possibly by very different peoples, some time around the last half of the 18th or the early 19th century. But it is also possible that 200K52/476 is one of those extremely rare sites occupied between 1625 AD and 1725 AD when both aboriginal stone-working and ceramic manufacturing technologies and European trade co-existed. Only carefully planned and executed archaeological excavation and professional analyses documenting undisturbed deposits can determine the facts regarding the potential importance of this site on Apple Island."

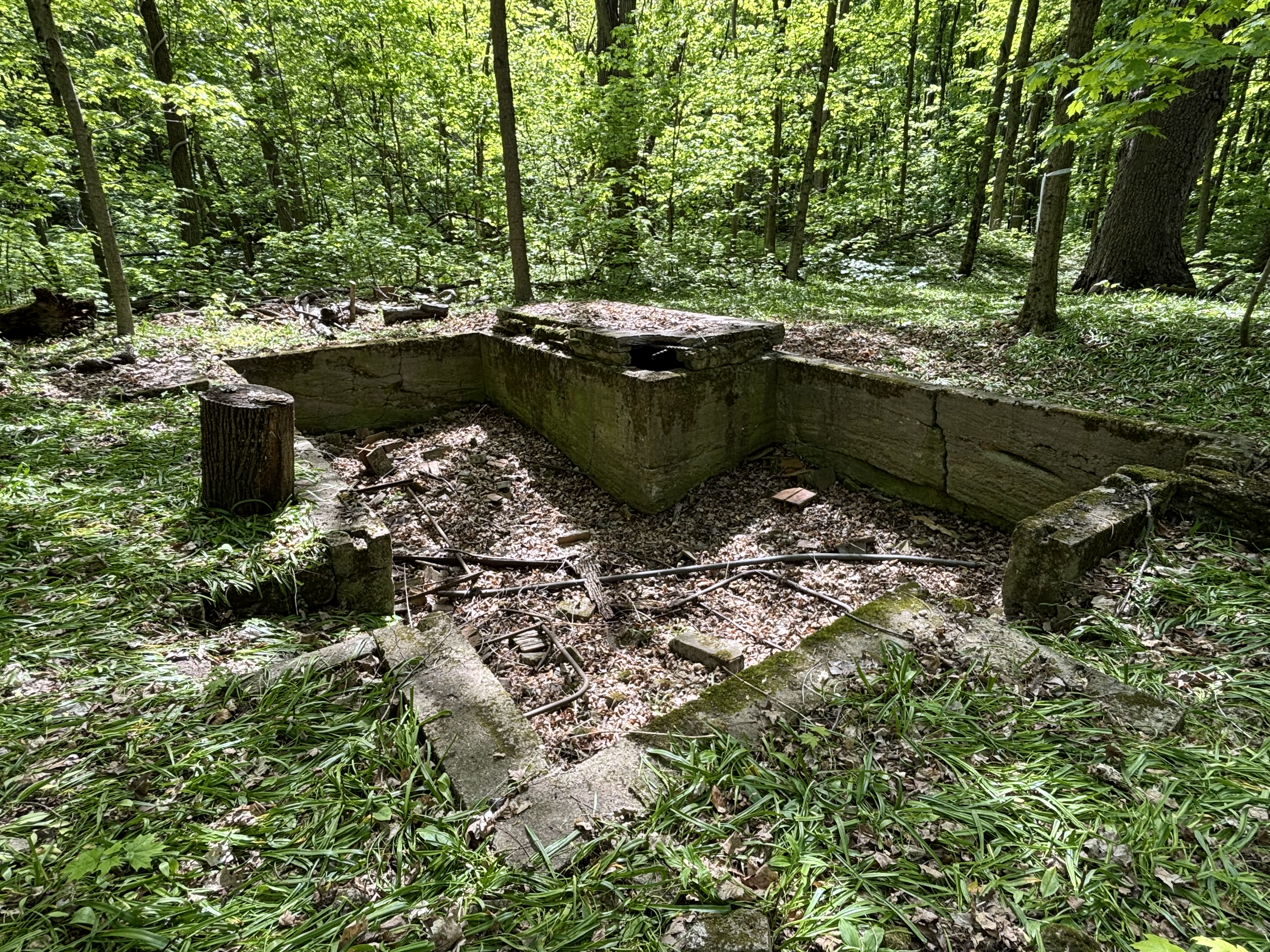
A 20th century foundation of a structure on Apple Island

Local folklore recounts Ottawa Chief Pontiac's burial on the island. To test the validity of these accounts, a limited excavation was conducted on a site the islanders referred to as "Pontiacs Mound" during a 2008 excavation. The results of the test suggested that it "appears to be only one of several rather level promontories extending without discernible interruption from the central plateau of the island toward northwestern shore. While additional deep testing may reveal other information, at this time the most appropriate hypothesis is to regard all of these adjacent landforms as non-cultural portions of the higher soils, dissected by centuries [if not millennia] of natural headward erosion and downslope weathering."

The island was listed on the National Register of Historic Places in 2018 for its archaeological significance.

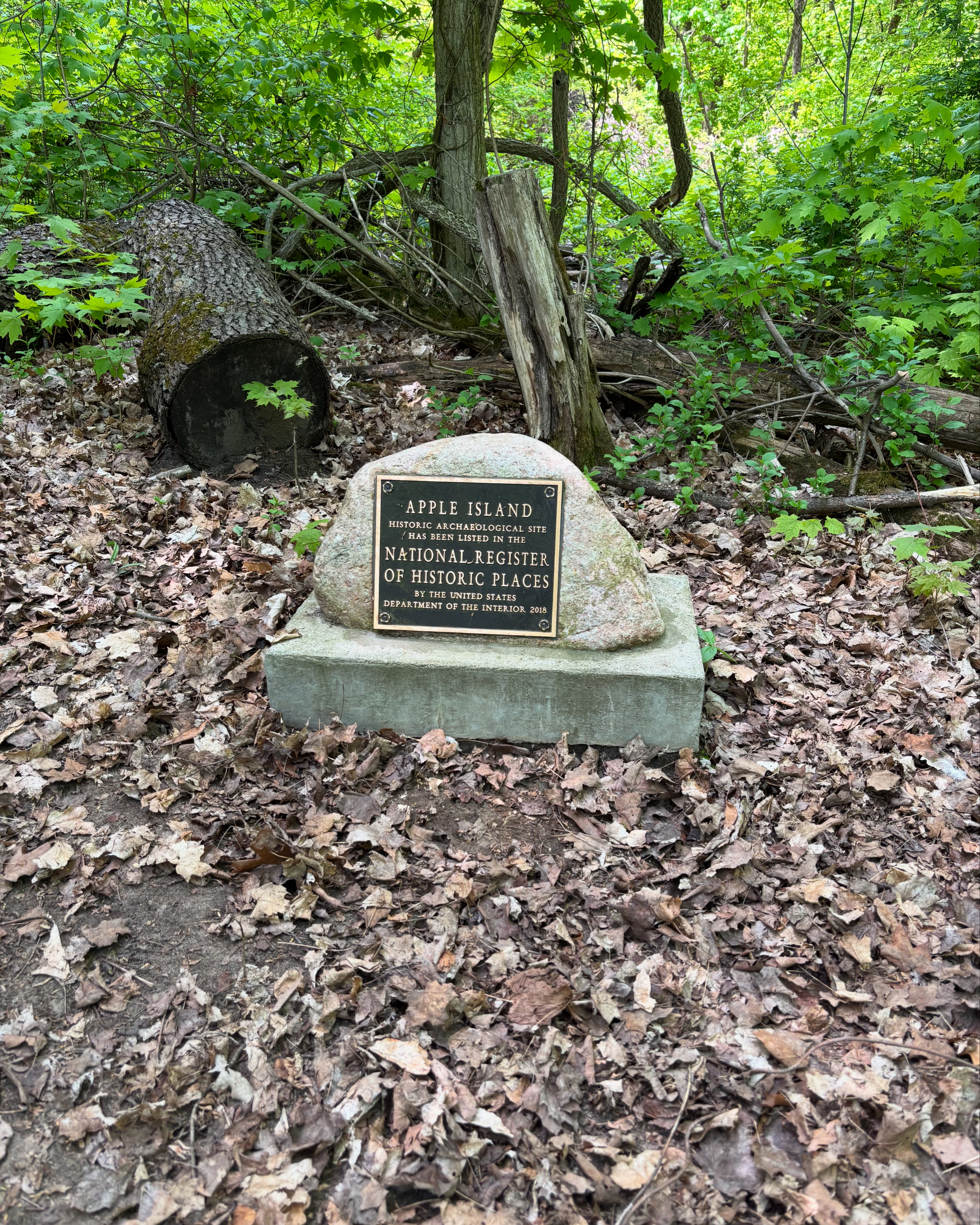
Apple Island historical marker

== Menahsagorning ==
Dr. Samuel M. Leggett's epic poem, circulated in 1909, first makes light of the fact that the island was once known as Me-Nah-Sa-Gor-Ning. The poem chronicles an insane Native American maiden's devotion to her deceased husband, and her subsequent murder at the hands of her tribe. Leggett claimed that his poem formalized popular lore.

According to one writer, a lake in Oakland County was called Menahsagorning, "apple place" by the Native Americans because of the nearby apple trees and orchards. (Baraga's dictionary defines mishiminatig as 'apple tree.') Early white settlers consequently named the body of water located there "Orchard Lake", as well as the town established there in 1827. The penultimate syllable of the aboriginal name is probably corrupted, because the "r" sound is not a part of the Three Fires language. In short, whatever words Native Americans actually used to refer to the island remain a mystery.

Samuel W. Durant's 1877 publication, The History of Oakland County Michigan, first mentions that Apple Island and 107 acres (0.43 km^{2}) on Orchard Lake's south shore were reservation lands. Durant does not indicate his source for this statement, and no independent source verifies this assertion. All subsequent publications have relied on Durant as the authority for this proposition.

== Native American settlement ==
Native American discovery of Apple Island happened at least 2,000 years ago. Apple Island’s first admirers were ancient Native Americans. They were drawn to the island because of the security and abundant resources that the land provided as a centerpoint around the surrounding lakes and fertile land for mainly hunting but also farming. While which Native American tribes inhabited the site prior to white settlement is unknown, each tribe left artifacts as to its way of life; the entire West Bloomfield lakes area has yielded many hammerstones, chert spearheads and bird stones left by Native Americans.

Upon this island, a great abundance of rich history, most of which is surely simply unknown or mythical, is clearly visible through the various artifacts collected. Tradition states that it was upon this island that meetings took place between many tribal groups, such as the Chief "Walk-in-the-Water" and the mightier Chief Pontaic himself. This island served as a stronghold for the Native Americans throughout several centuries as its unique geography from the charm of nature during the last ice age ten thousand years ago made the large island a unique place different Native American tribes called home. It is not known exactly which Native Americans frequented Apple Island over the centuries before white settlement, but each group left clues to its way of life, including those which were raising crops at the time of Carpenter’s 1817 survey.

The Treaty of Detroit, negotiated on November 17, 1807, surrendered land consisting of approximately the southeast quarter of the lower peninsula of present-day Michigan and a small section of present-day Ohio from the Odawa, Ojibwe, Wyandot, and Potawatomi to the United States government. The eventual settlers to this island remarked that Native Americans frequently visited the island, and referred to the area in their language as "apple place".

When deposed in 1856, Chief Okemos stated, "I was born in Michigan, near Pontiac, on an island in a lake… I was 30 years old when I left the place I was born." Okemos's reference may have been to Apple Island.

== White settlement ==
=== James Galloway ===
After Native Americans ceded the island to the United States in the Treaty of Detroit, James Galloway of Palmyra, New York, purchased the island on June 18, 1827, at the price of eleven shillings, eight pence per acre. Galloway probably never lived on the island, because his name is absent from the 1830 census of the Michigan Territory. One of his sons however eventually settled east of Pontiac. Galloway's last will and testament, dated November 19, 1838, states: "I give to my said daughter Julia Ann Galloway all that piece of land, called Apple Island in Orchard Lake. So called, situated in the state of Michigan, and not many miles from Pontiac." West Bloomfield records show that "non-resident" Joseph Allen, Julia Ann Galloway's husband, paid $1.23 in taxes on the island in 1847.

=== William Dow ===
In 1830, William Dow accompanied by his parents and siblings immigrated to the area from Fife, Scotland. The family settled on 270 acres (1.1 km^{2}) on the isthmus between Orchard and Cass lakes, now called Dow Ridge for William Dow, in sections 9 and 10. Dow was probably the first white person to live on the island, and the first members of what would later be known as the "Scotch settlement." On August 19, 1847, William Dow purchased Apple Island from the Allens for $1,050. In 1849, Dow paid taxes based partly on personal property associated with the parcel. Dow spent his final years as a farmer in West Bloomfield after later selling his property to John Coats. William Dow and his descendants continue to live on Dow ridge (In between Cass Lake and Orchard lake) until the early twentieth century. William Dow died on January 2, 1862, and is buried in Pontiac's Oak Hill Cemetery.

=== John Coats ===
John Coats subsequently purchased the island on June 25, 1851, for $1,600. Coats immigrated from Paisley, Scotland, and was the youngest son of cotton thread innovator James Coats. Two of John Coats' brothers, James and Peter, formed the J & P Coats Thread Co. In the late 1840s, John Coats came to the island to act as an agent for his brothers' company. He was a founding member of Detroit's St. Andrew's Society in 1849, and co-owner of Jack & Coats, a wholesale and retail dry-goods store on Jefferson Avenue. After Coats's left his business, he built a single-story Greek Revival home on the island's highest point. Coats eventually returned to Scotland when his son James was old enough to attend school.

=== Colin Campbell ===
On August 27, 1856, John Coats sold the island to Colin Campbell for $3,050. Campbell was a successful Scottish dry goods merchant with a store on Jefferson and a founding member of the St. Andrew's Society. Campbell's extended family and friends lived on the island for almost 60 years. Extensive gardens and orchards were planted, and many new structures were built. However the island retained some of its historic feel by remaining free from electricity, telephones and indoor plumbing. Colin Campbell's wife Caroline was instrumental in the formation of Orchard Lake Community Church, Presbyterian in 1871.

=== The Wards ===
David Ward was trained by his father to be a surveyor. In 1863, Ward moved to a farm at Orchard Lake after his prosecution of "log thieves" caused his children to be harassed. Ward lived at the farm, except in the winter when business required him to return to Detroit.

Ward's son Willis published his own book, Orchard Lake and its Island, in 1942. The book recounts stories of many Orchard Lake families, and how diverse wildlife once occupied the area. Willis Ward's children, Marjorie Ward Strong and Harold Lee Ward, inherited the island after their father's death in 1943. After Ward Strong died in 1970, the island was conveyed to its present owner, the West Bloomfield School District, for use as an educational nature center.

== Sources ==
This material was originally compiled for the Greater West Bloomfield Historical Society GWBHS for the Winter, 2002 newsletter. The material was further revised in May 2006 and became part of the historical society's Pocket Professor series.

== See also ==
- National Register of Historic Places listings in Oakland County, Michigan
