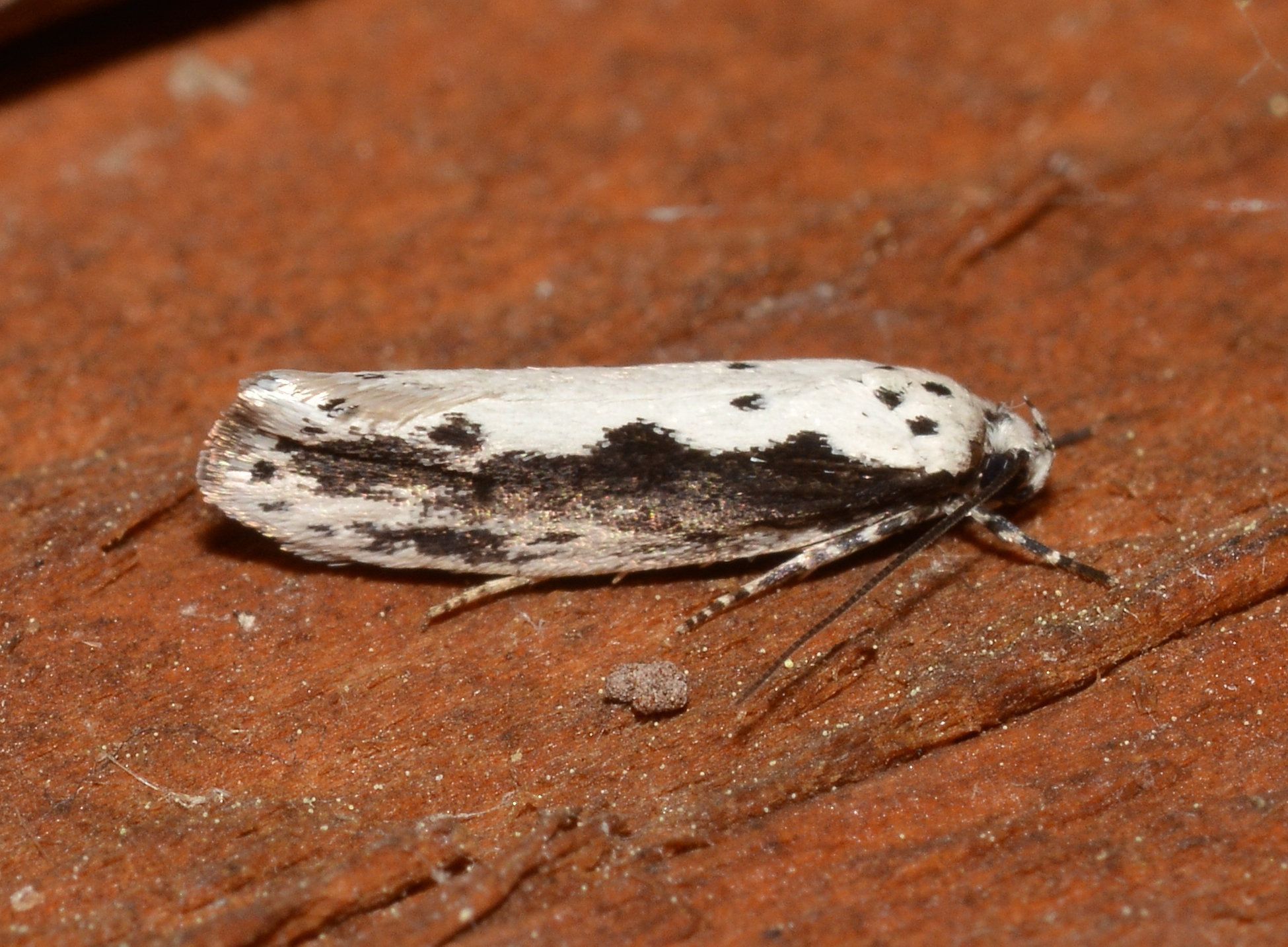

Scientific classification
- Kingdom: Animalia
- Phylum: Arthropoda
- Clade: Pancrustacea
- Class: Insecta
- Order: Lepidoptera
- Family: Depressariidae
- Genus: Ethmia
- Species: E. trifurcella

Binomial name
- Ethmia trifurcella (Chambers, 1873)

Synonyms
- Anesychia trifurcella Chambers, 1873

= Ethmia trifurcella =

Species of moth

Ethmia trifurcella is a moth in the family Depressariidae. It is found in North America from Pennsylvania, Ohio and Kentucky to North Carolina and northern Florida and westward, Nuevo León, Arizona and Wyoming.

The length of the forewings is 7.6–9.8 mm (0.30–0.39 in). The pattern of the forewings is divided longitudinally by a somewhat sinuate (wavy) line. The dorsal area is white or pale gray and contains a single dark spot at about the basal one-third. The costal half is dark brownish or blackish. The ground color of the hindwings is pale brownish, slightly darker distally. Adults are on wing in April (in Florida and Ohio), in May (in Kentucky), in June (in Nuevo León and Florida), in July (in Kentucky, Wyoming, Pennsylvania and Maryland) and September (in North Carolina). There are probably two generations per year.

The larvae feed on Cynoglossum virginianum. They form a tubular shelter on the underside of the leaf and feeds upon the leaves.
