= Limestone bedstraw =

Limestone bedstraw is a common name for several plants and may refer to:

- Galium proliferum, native to the southwestern United States and northern Mexico
- Galium sterneri, native to northern Europe
