= Panthertown Valley Bog =

Bog in Nantahala National Forest, Jackson County, North Carolina

Coordinates: 35°9′51″N 83°1′26″W

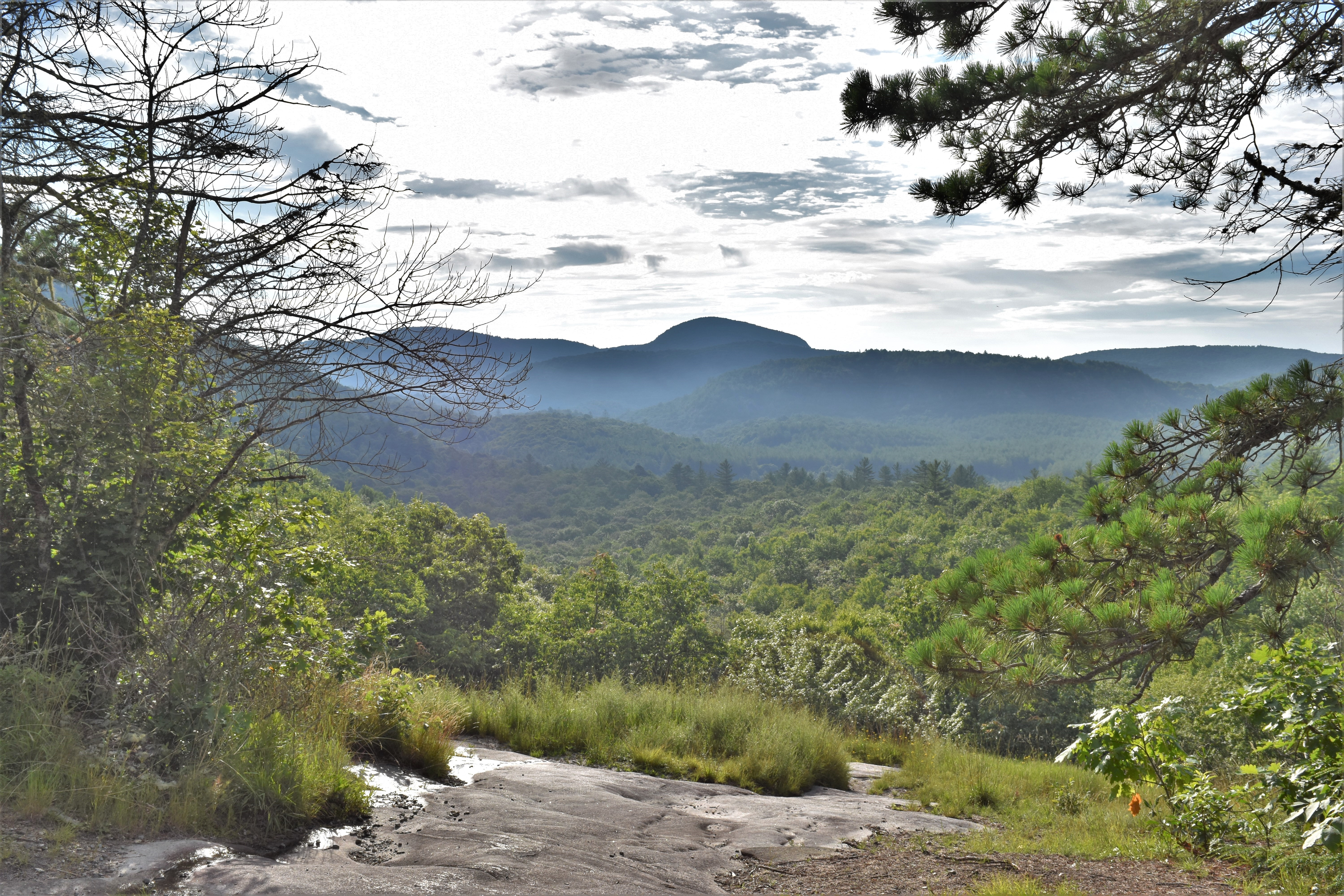
Scene above Panthertown Valley Bog

The Panthertown Valley Bog is a rare high-elevation mountain bog in Southern Appalachia. It spans approximately 15 to 30 acres (12 ha) within the larger 6,300-acre Panthertown Valley in the Nantahala National Forest, Jackson County, North Carolina. It was formed atop a layer of bedrock which has created poor drainage conditions. Water accumulating in the bog primarily comes from groundwater seeping down from the surrounding granite domes. Over time, these conditions have allowed organic matter to build up and form a thick mucky soil layer. Slow decomposition of sphagnum moss has led to an accumulation of peat, which increases acidity in the soil. These conditions have created a suitable environment for a unique community of wildlife and plant species.

== Ecological significance and biodiversity ==
While this wetland is often referred to as a bog, hydrologically it would be considered a poor fen as it is fed primarily by groundwater seepage rather than rainfall. This bog particularly differs from a fen as it is higher in acidity and abundant in Sphagnum moss. Fens typically have higher pH and its vegetation dominated by sedges. Water from the bog drains into Boggy Creek and Panthertown Creek, which serve as headwaters for the Tuckasegee River. This system ultimately contributes to the Tennessee River basin, which functions as regional water filtration and watershed health.

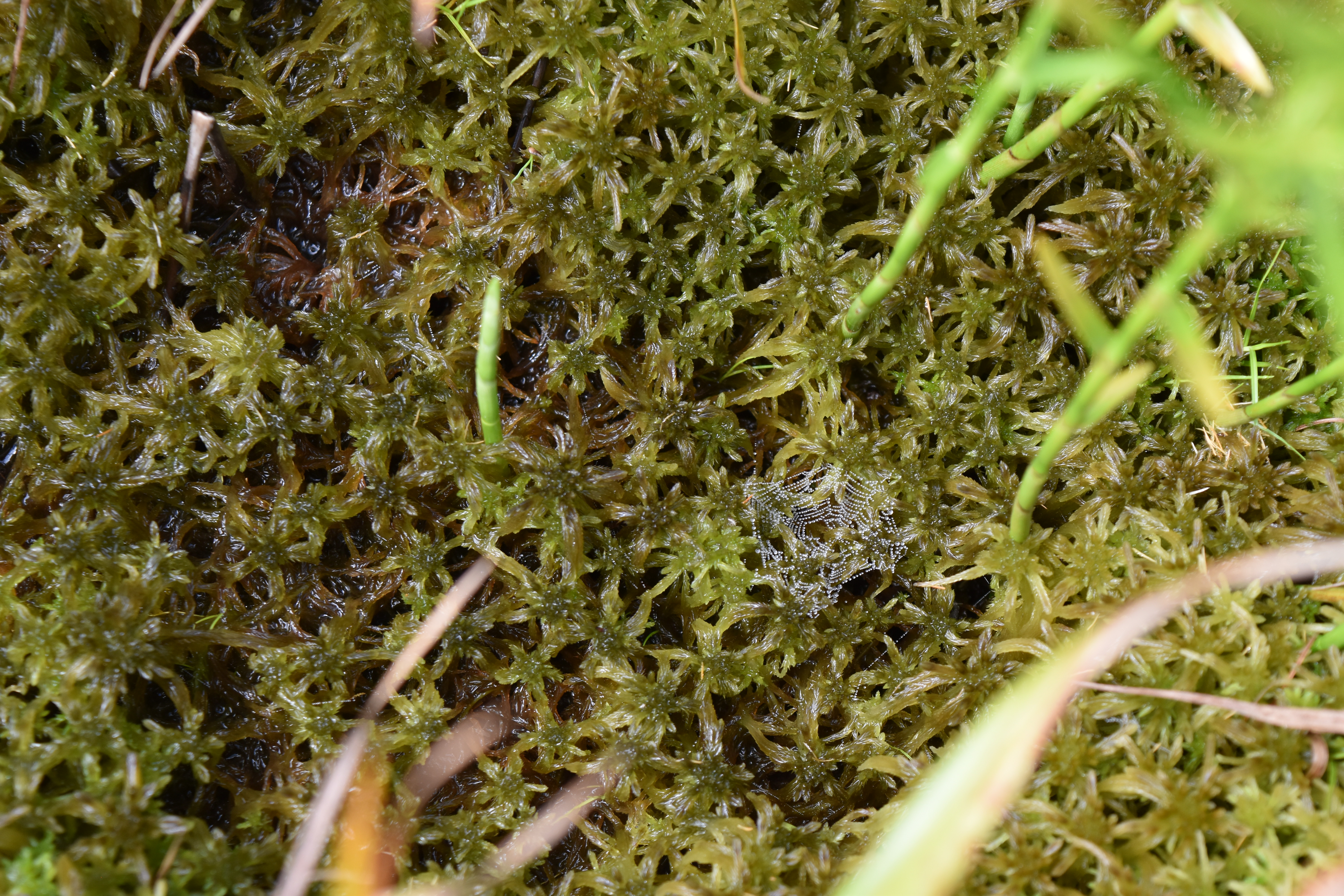
Sphagnum moss in Panthertown Valley bog

This bog is open dominated by sphagnum moss and herbaceous species with fewer tree species due to periodic disturbances. Tree species found in these Southern Appalachian Bogs are red maple (Acer rubrum), white pine (Pinus strobus), eastern hemlock (Tsuga canadensis), and pitch pine (Pinus rigida). Other species present in the bog are cinnamon fern (Osmundastrum cinnamomeum), St. Johns wort (Hypericum perforatum), sundews, and sedges (Carex and Cyperus spp,). Under the USDA's management plan, they have listed the forest surrounding the bog as an acidic cove that provide various wildlife an ecotone between the bog. Some wildlife present within this system is wild turkey, white-tailed deer, black bear, and eastern smooth earth snake.

Panthertown Valley Bog also provides habitat and conditions for rare species such as the Baltimore checkerspot. Mountain sweet pitcher (Sarracenia jonesii) plant is another important species as it is federally endangered. Bog turtles are another important species that have been heavily impacted by land fragmentation. Panthertown Valley Bog provides habitat to the bog turtle and is currently being managed to encourage the bog turtle back into the wetland. Other rare species include swamp pink (Helonias bullata), marsh bellflower (Campanula aparinoides) and narrowleaf peatmoss (Sphagnum angustifolium).

== History ==
Prior to colonization, native tribes such as the Cherokee inhabited and impacted the wetland and surrounding Nantahala National Forest. In the early 1900's the land was purchased by Moltz Lumber Co. The lumber company harvested thousands of valuable hemlock and hardwood species a day and built logging railroads along the French Broad River to the Tuckasegee River. In the 1930's due to the leftover slash from heavy logging there were likely wildfire's that maintained the open bog. Other disturbances that have been proposed for the development of the bog is flooding caused by beaver activity and animal grazing. From 1950-1980 Liberty Life Insurance owned the land and planted white pine that now threatens the diversity of the bog. In 1980 Duke Power Energy purchased the land and built power lines along the valley. Duke Energy then sold the land in 1989 to the Nature Conservancy for around $7 million dollars which then was sold in the same year to the current owner, the U.S Forest Service.

== Management and conservation ==
In recent years, conservation agencies have intensified efforts to protect what remains of mountain wetlands like Panthertown Valley Bog. Because these bogs are such fragile ecosystems, natural disturbances, such as periods of dryness from the surrounding pine forests can quickly diminish bog stability. Human impacts, such as recreation on the trails can result in high-risk introduction of invasive species and trampling. Particularly woody plant invasion is resulting in the closure of previously open portions of the bog.

Within the 2023 Nantahala and Pigsah National Forest land management plan, they outline goals to sustain healthy ecosystems. This includes the goal to reduce woody plant encroachment and non-native invasive plants in Southern Appalachian bogs like Panthertown Valley Bog. This would help to preserve habitat for threatened bog turtles, endangered swamp pink, and other rare species in Panthertown Valley.

This management plan also notes than an overabundance of white pine has impacted the bog's species diversity. To sustain healthy ecosystems, increasing young forest conditions in the area is needed, as well as greater open forest in mid- to late-seral stages.

Examining the swamp pink species in Appalachian bogs generally, it is threatened by trampling, habitat loss, fragmentation, and siltation. In a study done by the USFWS, buffer zones that were designed specifically to protect these species were found to be insufficient; recovery plans now recommend at least 500 feet of vegetated buffer to protect bogs from runoff associated with disturbance of adjacent areas. In some cases, they state that protection of the entire watershed may be necessary.

In 2022, Friends of Panthertown, a nonprofit conservation organization, was awarded a $35,000 Environmental Enhancement Grant (EEG) to help fund a major restoration effort in the valley. The USFS partnered with Friends of Panthertown and the Watershed Association of the Tuckasegee River to work on various remediation efforts for its natural resources. Remediation plans include planting native plants along eroded areas. constructing a 100-foot long backcountry boardwalk along the most eroded section of the main valley trail-which is bordered on both sides by the wetland. The bridge's primary purpose is to provide pedestrians access to this popular trail while avoiding further disturbance.

== Recreation ==
Within Panthertown Valley, there is a large network of trails that offer views of eight of its major waterfalls. The backcountry provides visitors with opportunities for long distance hiking, rock climbing on granitic domes, horseback riding, and deer and turkey hunting. Since tourism is a major economic driver for the area, these lands provide nature-based recreation in support of such.

One of the Nantahala land management goals is to work with recreation groups in maintaining the resiliency of rare plant communities through site specific management, stewardship, and education.
