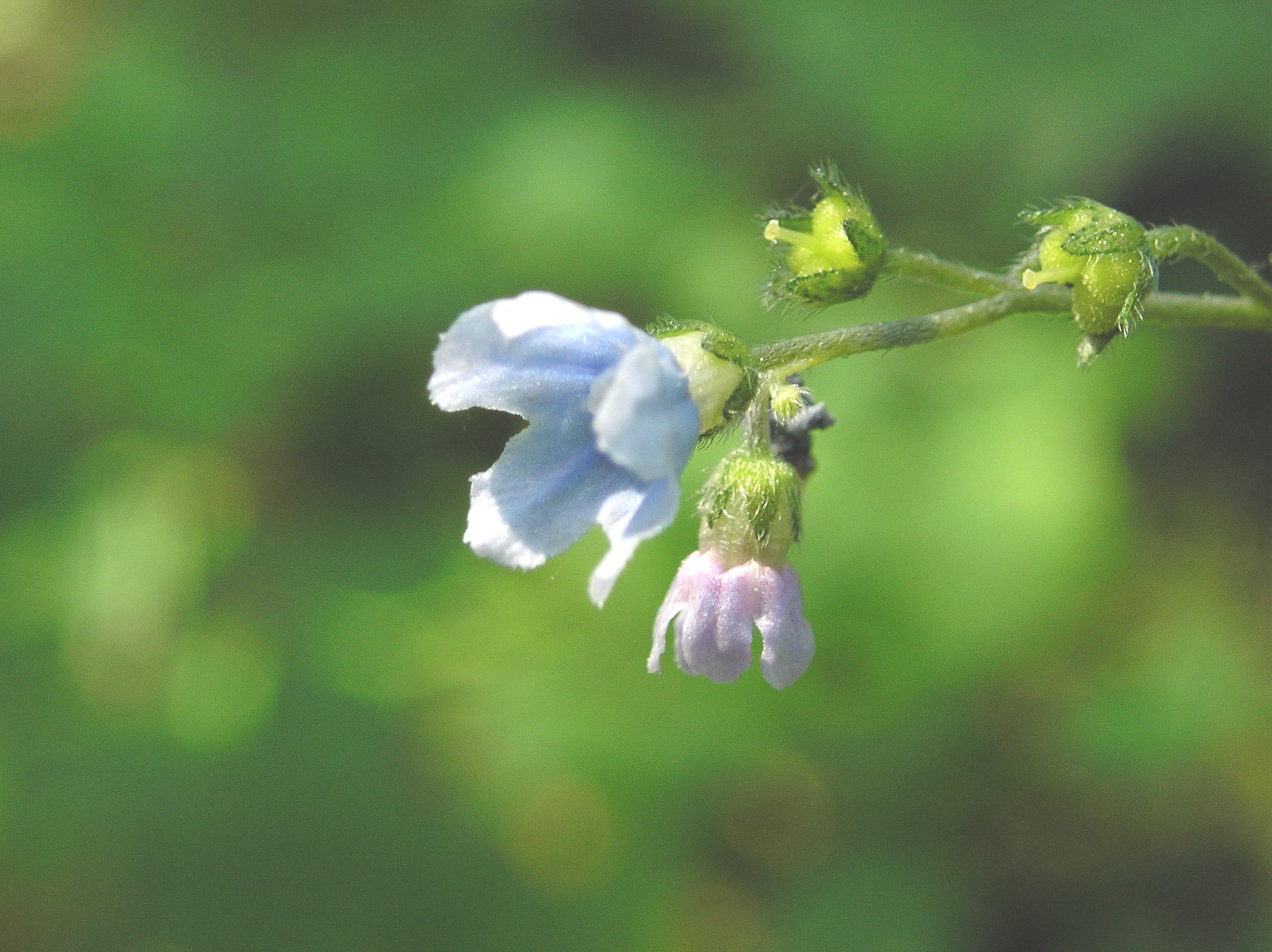
- Andersonglossum boreale

Scientific classification
- Kingdom: Plantae
- Clade: Tracheophytes
- Clade: Angiosperms
- Clade: Eudicots
- Clade: Asterids
- Order: Boraginales
- Family: Boraginaceae
- Tribe: Cynoglosseae
- Genus: Andersonglossum; J.I.Cohen

Type species
- Andersonglossum virginianum (L.) J.I.Cohen

= Andersonglossum =

Genus of flowering plants

Andersonglossum is a small genus of North American plants in the borage family (Boraginaceae). They are commonly called American comfreys, wild comfreys, or hound's tongues.

== Taxonomy ==
Members of this genus were formerly placed in the genus Cynoglossum. They were separated in 2015 from other members of Cynoglossum by James I. Cohen into the newly named Andersonglossum. Cohen named the genus in honor of William Russell Anderson (1942–2013), American botanist, director of the New York Botanical Garden Herbarium, and recipient of the Asa Gray Award. Of Anderson, Cohen stated: "an incomparable professor, botanist, and person, who inspired me to study plant systematics".

The type species is Andersonglossum virginianum (L.) J.I.Cohen (Cynoglossum virginianum L.).

=== Species ===
There are three species in Andersonglossum:

- Andersonglossum boreale (Fernald) Jim.Mejías, J.I.Cohen & Naczi — northern wild comfrey (Canada, northeastern United States)
- Andersonglossum occidentale (A.Gray) J.I.Cohen — western hound's tongue (California, Oregon)
- Andersonglossum virginianum (L.) J.I.Cohen — southern wild comfrey (eastern United States)
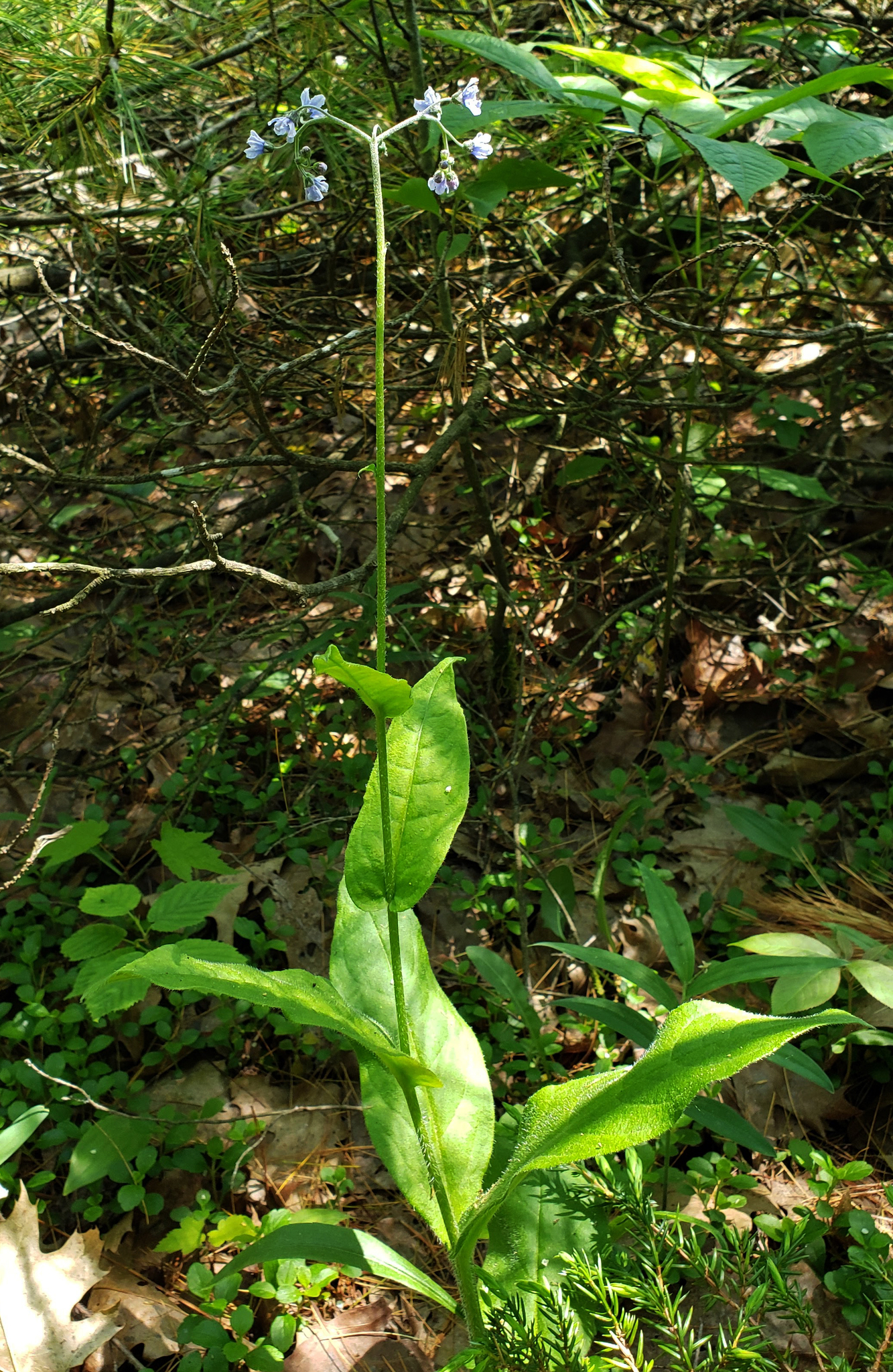
Andersonglossum boreale

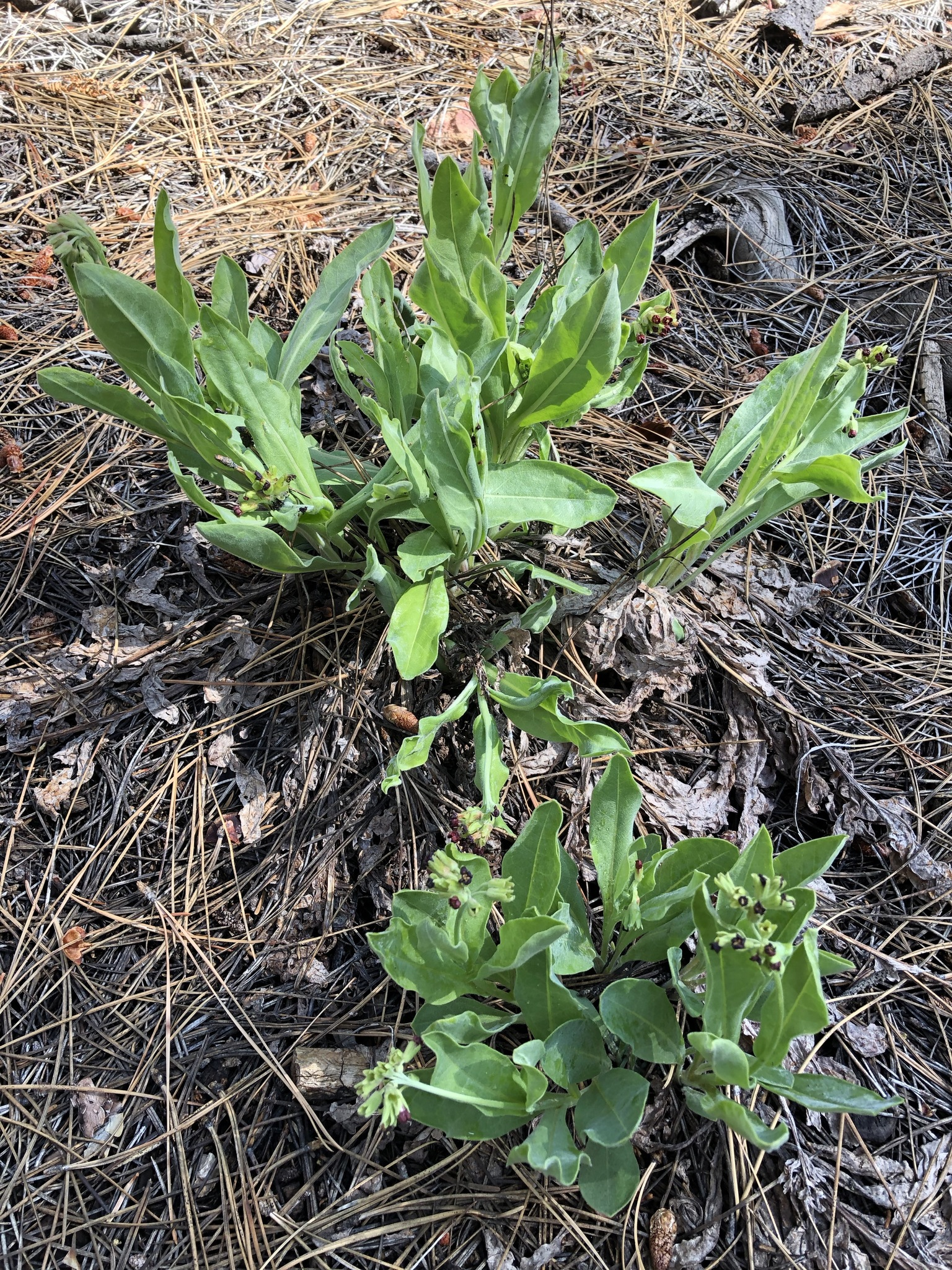
Andersonglossum occidentale

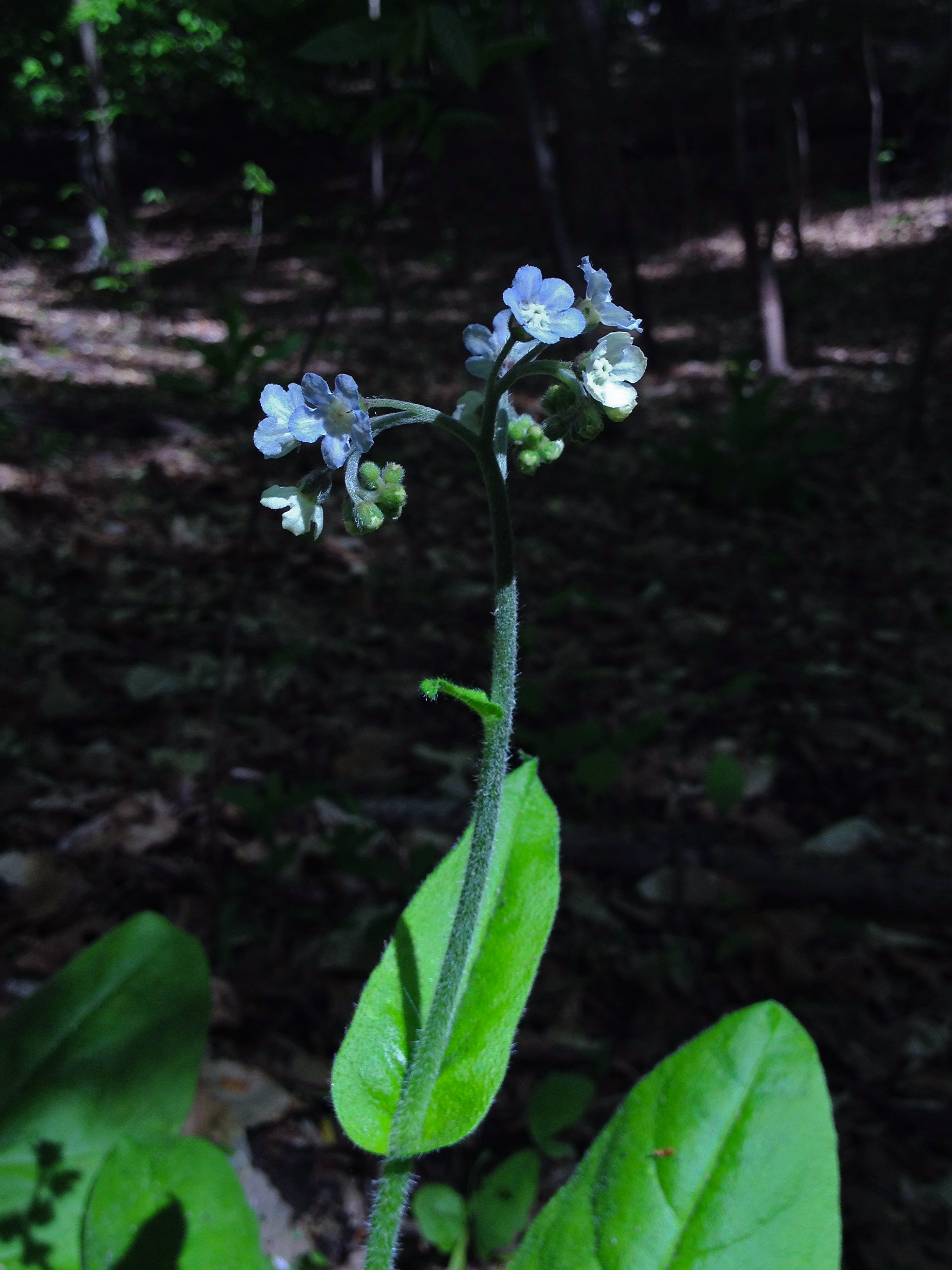
Andersonglossum virginianum
