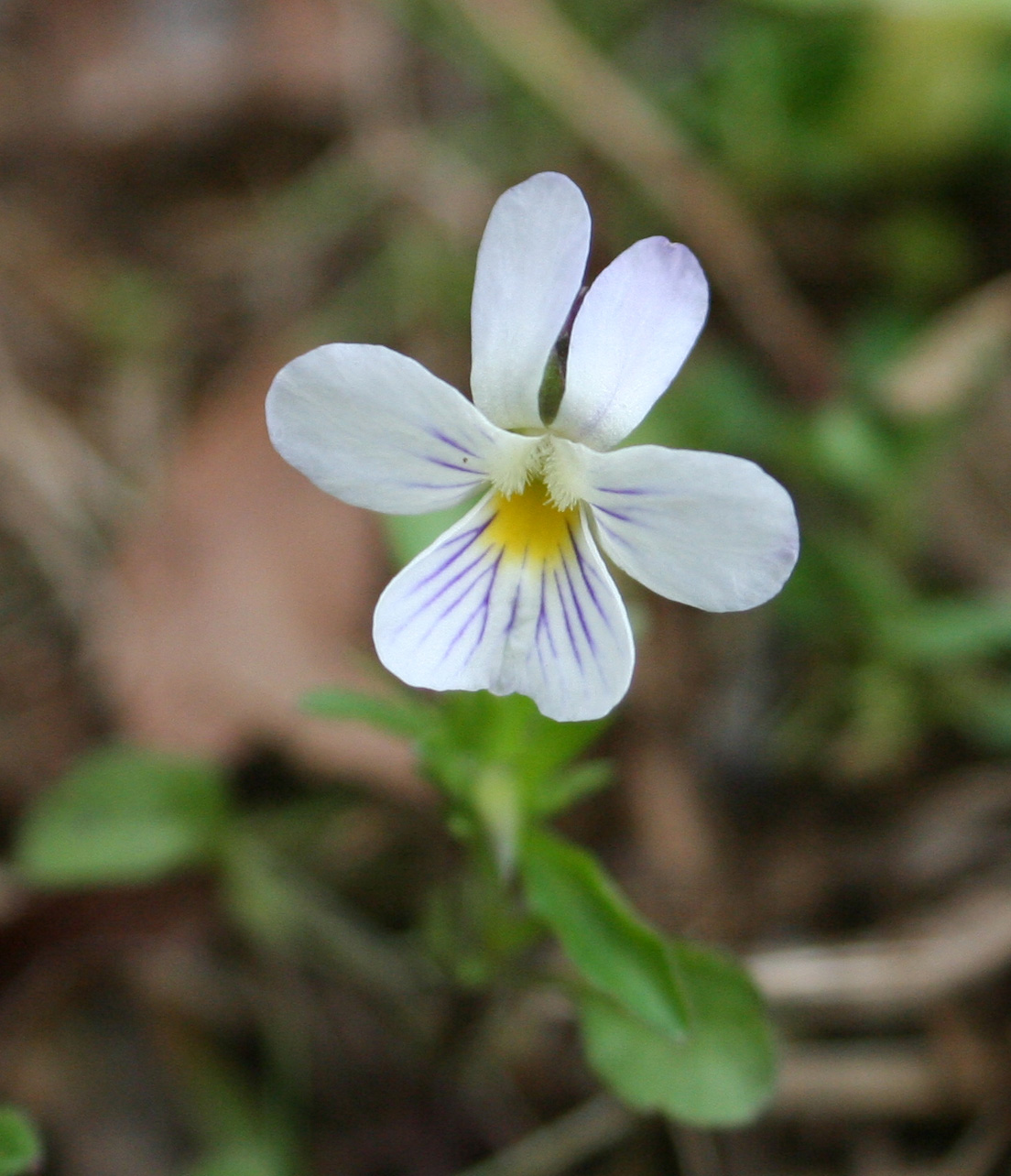
- A light morph flower growing in a sandy field along the mouth of the James River in southeastern Virginia

Conservation status
- Secure (NatureServe)

Scientific classification
- Kingdom: Plantae
- Clade: Embryophytes
- Clade: Tracheophytes
- Clade: Spermatophytes
- Clade: Angiosperms
- Clade: Eudicots
- Clade: Rosids
- Order: Malpighiales
- Family: Violaceae
- Genus: Viola
- Species: V. rafinesqueii

Binomial name
- Viola rafinesqueii Greene

Synonyms
- Mnemion rafinesquei (Greene) Nieuwl.; Mnemion tenellum Webb; Viola bicolor Pursh; Viola kitaibeliana var. rafinesquei (Greene) Fernald; Viola rafinesquei f. minor Moldenke

= Viola rafinesquei =

Species of flowering plant

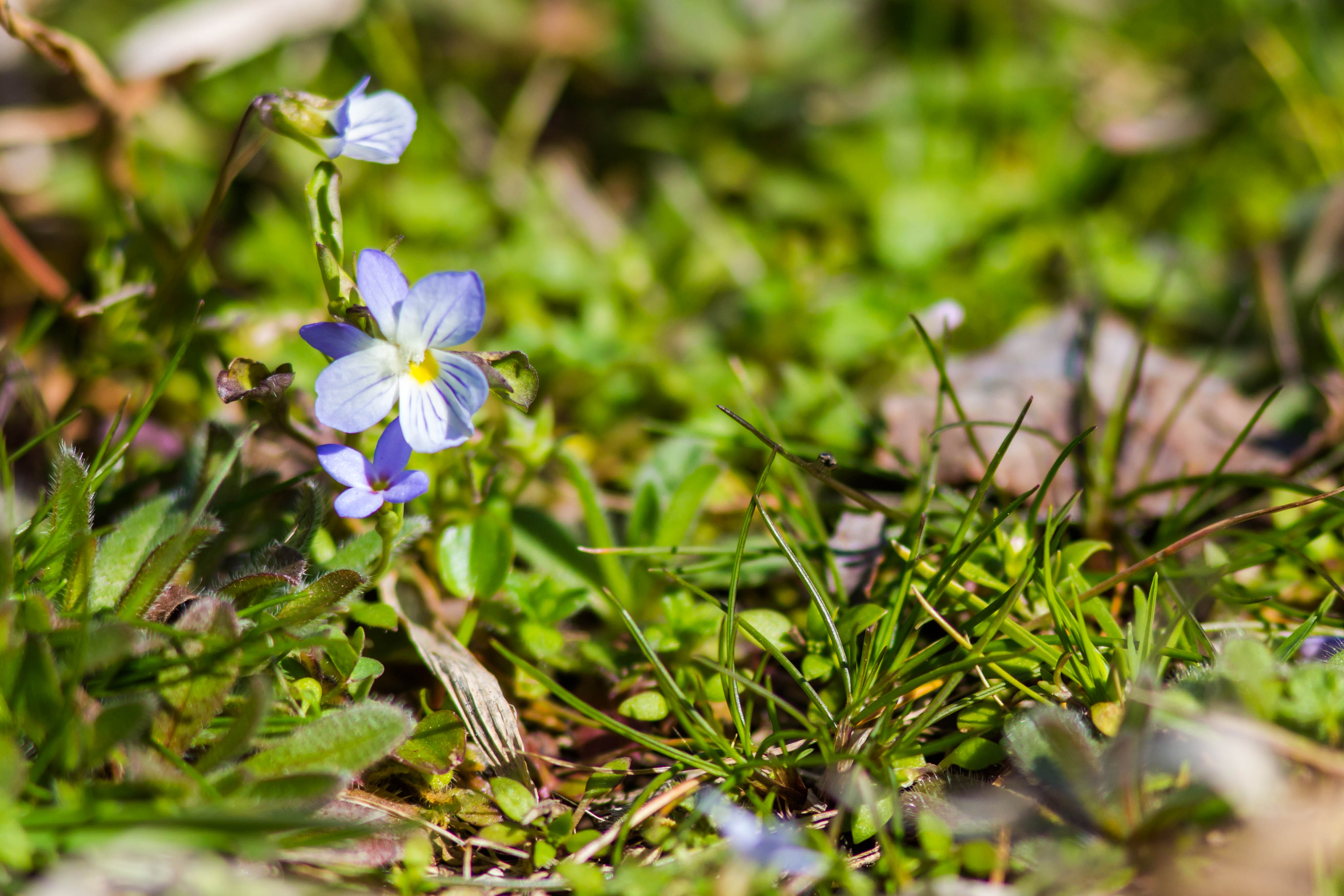
Viola rafinesqueii displaying its typical pale blue color.

Viola rafinesquii (syn. Viola bicolor), commonly known as the American field pansy or wild pansy, is an annual plant in the violet family found throughout much of North America. There has been some debate as to whether the plant is native to North America or if it was introduced from the Old World as a variety of Viola kitaibeliana, but it is now generally thought to be native to the North America. It is common in disturbed habitats but is also found in fields and open woods on substrates ranging from sandy soil to clay to limestone. It experiences a period of dormancy in the winter and flowers in the spring. V. rafinesquii holds a mutualistic relationship with ants, potentially aiding in reproduction. It held medicinal purposes among North American natives.

== Physical description ==
V. rafinesquii possesses five blue-white flower petals, five sepals, and displays a head inflorescence. The base of the lowest petal has a hint of yellow. They are asymmetrical, with the lowermost petal being larger than the others. The petals are much longer than their lanceolate sepals, measuring 9 mm. Dense, clavate hairs can be found on the petals. The stem is freely branched and measures anywhere from 0.5 to 5 inches in height. The leaves are simple, subpinnately lobed, and alternately arranged. They are found on an above-ground stem, and lack surface hairs. The upper leaves are larger than the lower leaves, measuring 24 x 6 mm and 14 x 11 mm, respectively. They also differ in morphology, with the upper leaves appearing oblanceolate and the lower leaves oblong-ovate. The edges of both upper and lower leaves are serrated. The seeds produced are light brown in color.

== Distribution and habitat ==
The American field pansy is native to North America, and can be found throughout central and eastern United States, ranging from New York to Florida. It can also be found in midwestern states, including Colorado and Arizona. V. rafinesquii can be found in large populations, often on roadsides. V. rafinesquii prefers sandy soils, but can survive in other habitats. Direct sun is also preferred, but the plant can survive in areas of partial shade. Although V. rafinesquii appears to be resilient in varying habitats in eastern North America, attempts to cultivate the species in California and Denmark were largely unsuccessful.

== Phenology ==
V. rafinesquii is a winter annual, as it germinates in the fall, is vegetative in the winter, and produces seeds in the spring. V. rafinesquii is dimorphic and possesses cosexual flowers, allowing them to engage in both cross-pollination and self-pollination. Initially, chasmogamous flowers are produced, and cleistogamy is displayed later in the spring. This opens the possibility for both genetic diversity and reproductive assurance. Cleistogamous flowers differ physically from their chasmogamous counterparts in the reduction of four anthers. This also distinguishes V. rafinesquii from other flowers in the Viola genus whose cleistogamous flowers have a reduction of three anthers. Fruit from the chasmogamous flowers is produced beginning in March, and fruit from the cleistogamous flowers is produced later in May. V. rafinesquii seeds enter a stage of relative dormancy, where germination is prevented until the seed experiences certain environmental conditions, 1–2 months after a short period of primary dormancy, or the germination delay that occurs following dispersal. Once in this stage, the seeds germinate in response to low temperatures, but as time progresses, the seeds exit this period of dormancy. The seeds are then able to germinate in a wider range of environmental conditions, specifically higher temperatures.

== Myrmecochory ==
Ants and flowers from the Violaceae family engage in a mutualistic relationship, known as myrmecochory, in which ants disperse seeds in return for nutrients supplied by the flower seed in the form of an elaiosome. This dispersal allows for the relocation of seeds to environments that may be better suited for survival and promotes outcrossing. V. rafinesquii experience seed removal by ants less frequently than other species in the viola genus. This could be due to the smaller size of their seeds, or a decreased need for ant removal due to other dispersal methods.

== Taxonomy ==
V. rafinesquii was originally classified as Viola tenella. This name has since been abandoned, as it was also used to refer to Viola kitaibeliana, which is native to Europe. The American field pansy has also been categorized as Viola bicolor, which was determined to be the same plant in 1961. V. bicolor was considered to be synonymous with Viola tricolor, however this plant is native to Europe, and therefore was categorized differently. Some hypothesize that V. rafinesquii may have instead originated in Mexico. The presence of 17 chromosome pairs, rather than the 13 possessed by V. tricolor, aided in this differentiation.

=== Etymology ===
Greene's obersvations ultimately delineated this flower as Viola rafinesquii. This name derives from the Latin term for violet, viola, and Constantine Samuel Rafinesque, a French mathematician.

=== Viola genus ===
Comprising over 600 species, the Viola genus is larger than most angiosperm genera. It is primarily composed of violets and pansies. Members of this genus can be found worldwide, but are common in temperate zones specifically. Flowers in this genus often had medicinal uses, but were also cultivated for their fragrance and grown as ornamentals. Flowers in the Viola genus compare in physical characteristics, such as white, blue, and yellow coloring. A reproductive strategy common of flowers in this genus is dimorphic cleistogamy in which flowers produced when days are long are typically cleistogamous compared to the chasmogamous flowers that are produced in periods of short days. Hybridzation is common within this genus, leading to allopolyploidization. This has made the identification of species within the Viola genus difficult.

== Ethnobotany ==
A paste made from the leaves of Viola rafinesquii was used by the Cherokee people as a pain reliever and topical agent. The plant was also steeped in hot water to relieve a variety of symptoms, including a cough, dysentery, and congestion.

V. rafinesquii can now be used as an alternative to grass in landscaping. It is not well suited for a garden, however, due to its weed-like behavior, and therefore should be planted in an open area.
