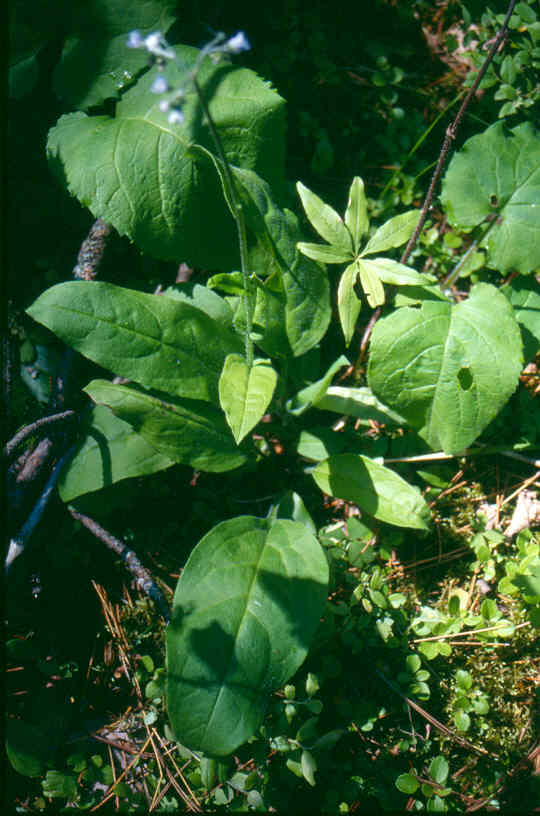
- In Bruce County, Ontario

Conservation status
- Apparently Secure (NatureServe)

Scientific classification
- Kingdom: Plantae
- Clade: Tracheophytes
- Clade: Angiosperms
- Clade: Eudicots
- Clade: Asterids
- Order: Boraginales
- Family: Boraginaceae
- Genus: Andersonglossum
- Species: A. boreale

Binomial name
- Andersonglossum boreale (Fernald) Jim.Mejías, J.I.Cohen & Naczi

Synonyms
- Cynoglossum boreale Fernald; Cynoglossum virginianum subsp. boreale (Fernald) A.Haines; Cynoglossum virginianum var. boreale (Fernald) Cooperr.

= Andersonglossum boreale =

Species of flowering plant

Andersonglossum boreale, known as northern wild comfrey or just wild comfrey, is a species of flowering plant in the borage family, Boraginaceae. It is native to boreal coniferous and mixed forests in North America, from Nova Scotia to British Columbia and Yukon in Canada, south to New Jersey and Indiana in the United States. It is often found in rocky or sandy soils. It is extirpated (locally extinct) from many of the southern parts of its range.

== Description ==
Northern wild comfrey is a small, perennial herbaceous plant growing up to 2 ft (61 cm) tall. The oval-shaped leaves are broader at the base of the plant, growing 4–8 in (10–20 cm) long and 1–3 in (25–76 mm) wide with short petioles. The upper leaves clasp the stem. A branching inflorescence is produced at the top of the plant, with several, small, five-petaled blue flowers. The fruit is a bristly nutlet.

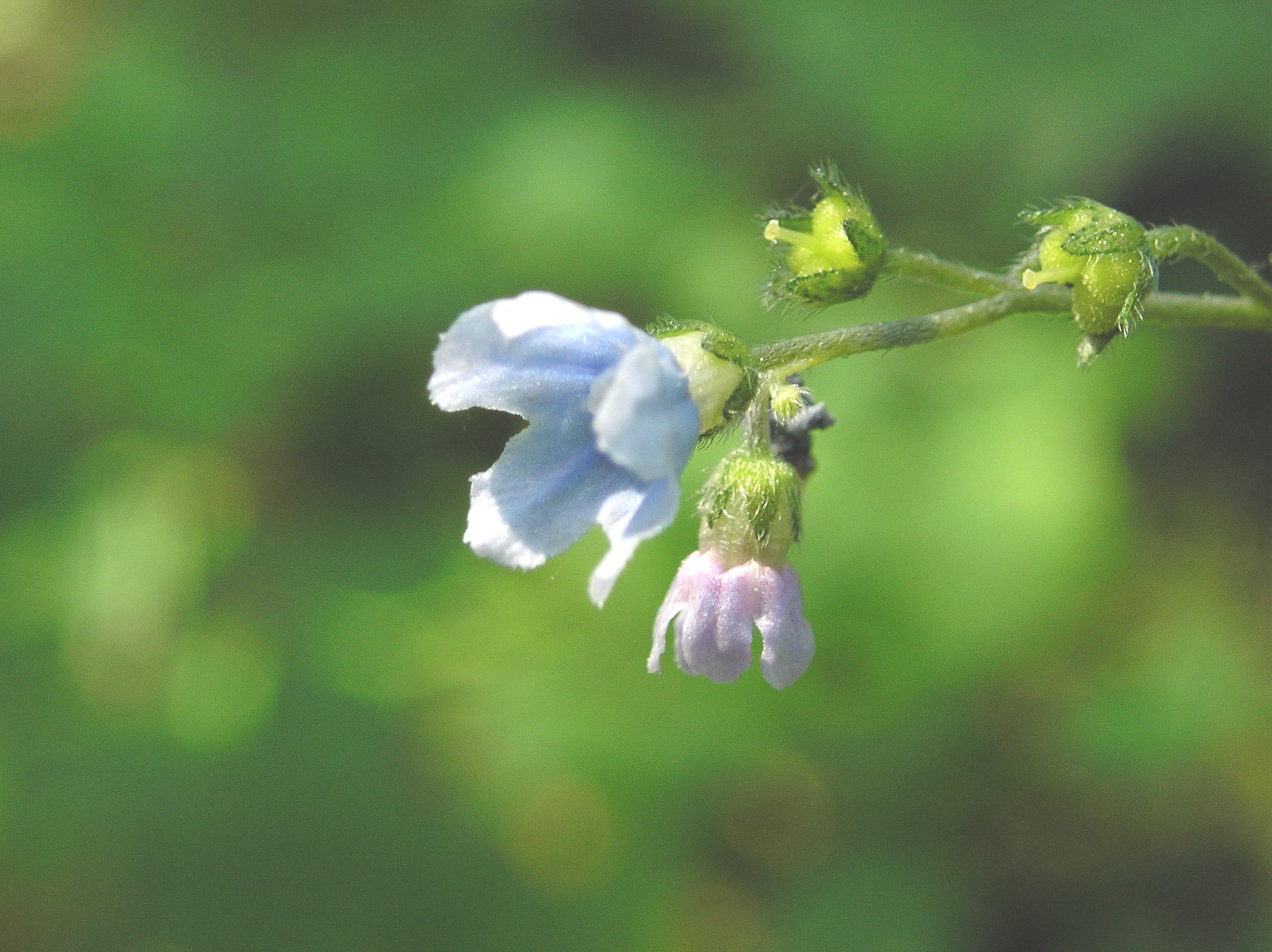
Flower detail

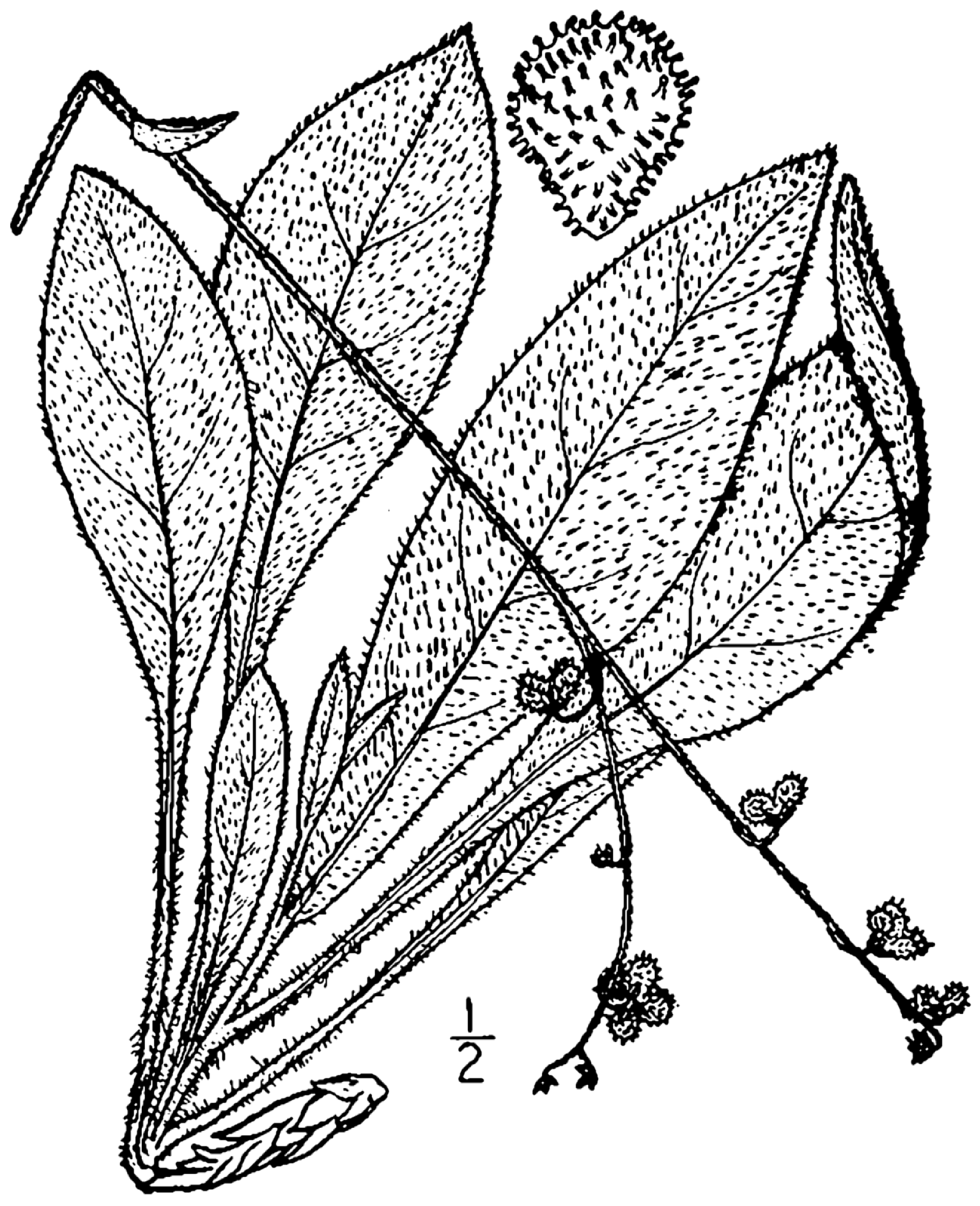
Illustration from Briton and Brown 1913

== Taxonomy ==
Northern wild comfrey was originally described as Cynoglossum boreale Fernald in 1905. It has since been treated as a subspecies or variety of Cynoglossum virginianum (now Andersonglossum virginanum), a more southerly species, but re-elevated to species as Andersonglossum boreale. Its first description as A. boreale in 2015 was invalid per the International Code of Nomenclature for algae, fungi, and plants (ICN, Article 36), as the author had created the new combination but did not personally accept it as a species distinct from A. virginianum:

"Although the author does not accept A. boreale as distinct from A. virginianum, given that it is accepted by other botanists, the appropriate new combination has been made."

— James I. Cohen, 2015

A 2017 study by the same author, with Pedro Jiménez-Mejías and Robert F. C. Naczi, compared the morphology of digitized herbarium specimens and confirmed its distinctness from Andersonglossum virginianum, validating the name Andersonglossum boreale. The study found that A. boreale has a shorter calyx length, smaller corolla diameter, and smaller nutlets.
