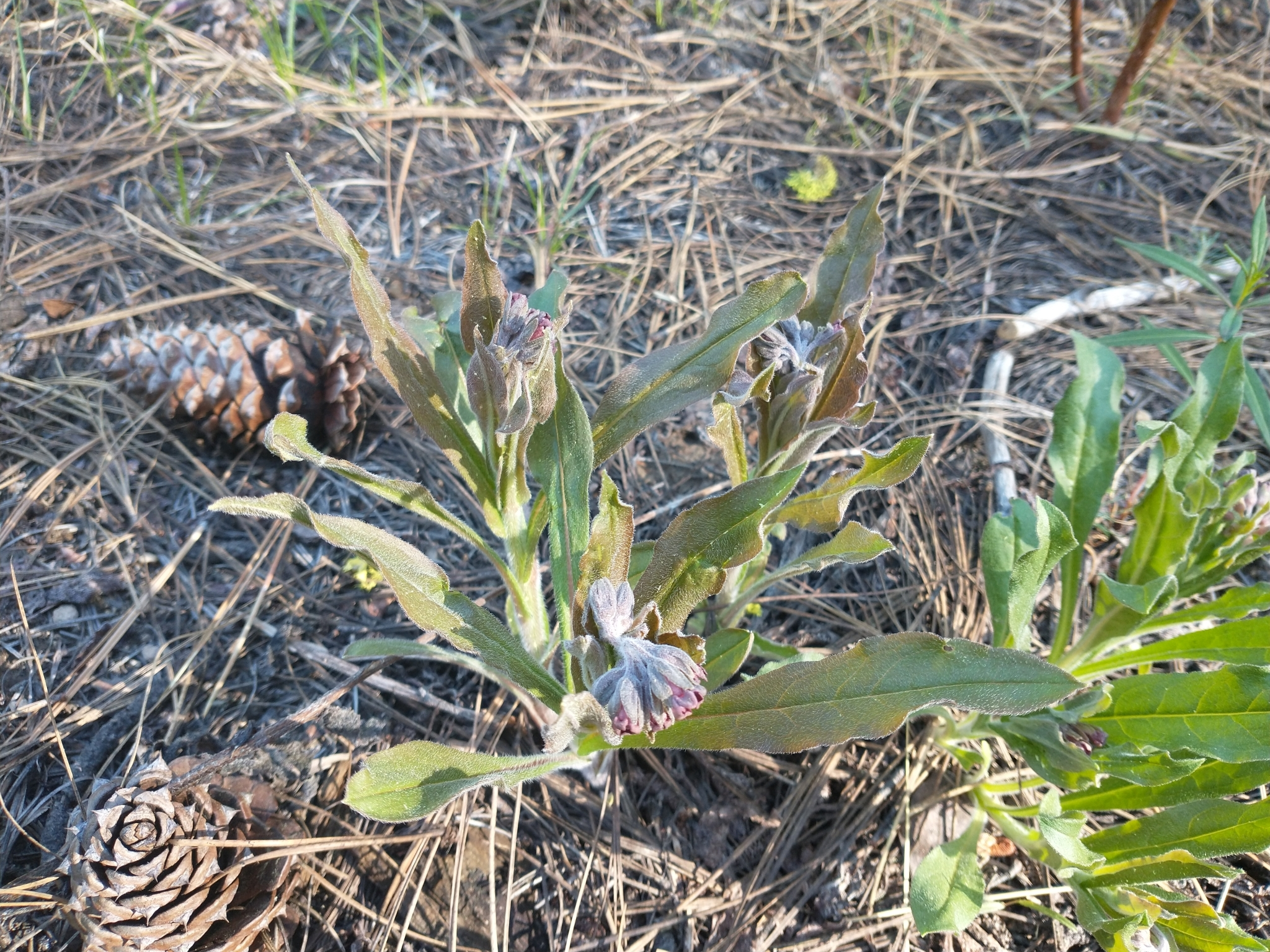

Conservation status
- Vulnerable (NatureServe)

Scientific classification
- Kingdom: Plantae
- Clade: Tracheophytes
- Clade: Angiosperms
- Clade: Eudicots
- Clade: Asterids
- Order: Boraginales
- Family: Boraginaceae
- Genus: Andersonglossum
- Species: A. occidentale

Binomial name
- Andersonglossum occidentale (Gray) J.I.Cohen

Synonyms
- Cynoglossum occidentale

= Andersonglossum occidentale =

Species of flowering plant

Andersonglossum occidentale is a species of flowering plant in the borage family known by the common name western hound's tongue.

It is native to Oregon and northern California, where it is a resident of the coniferous understory, including in the Cascade Range, Klamath Mountains, and the Sierra Nevada.

== Description ==
It is a perennial plant with hairy stems which may approach half a metre in height. It has rough, hairy leaves up to 15 centimetres (5.9 in) long and 4 cm (1.6 in) wide with winged petioles. From the top of the leafy stem appears an inflorescence of tube-shaped reddish-purple flowers, each about a centimetre long. The fruits are bumpy, bristly nutlets attached to each other in clusters of four.
