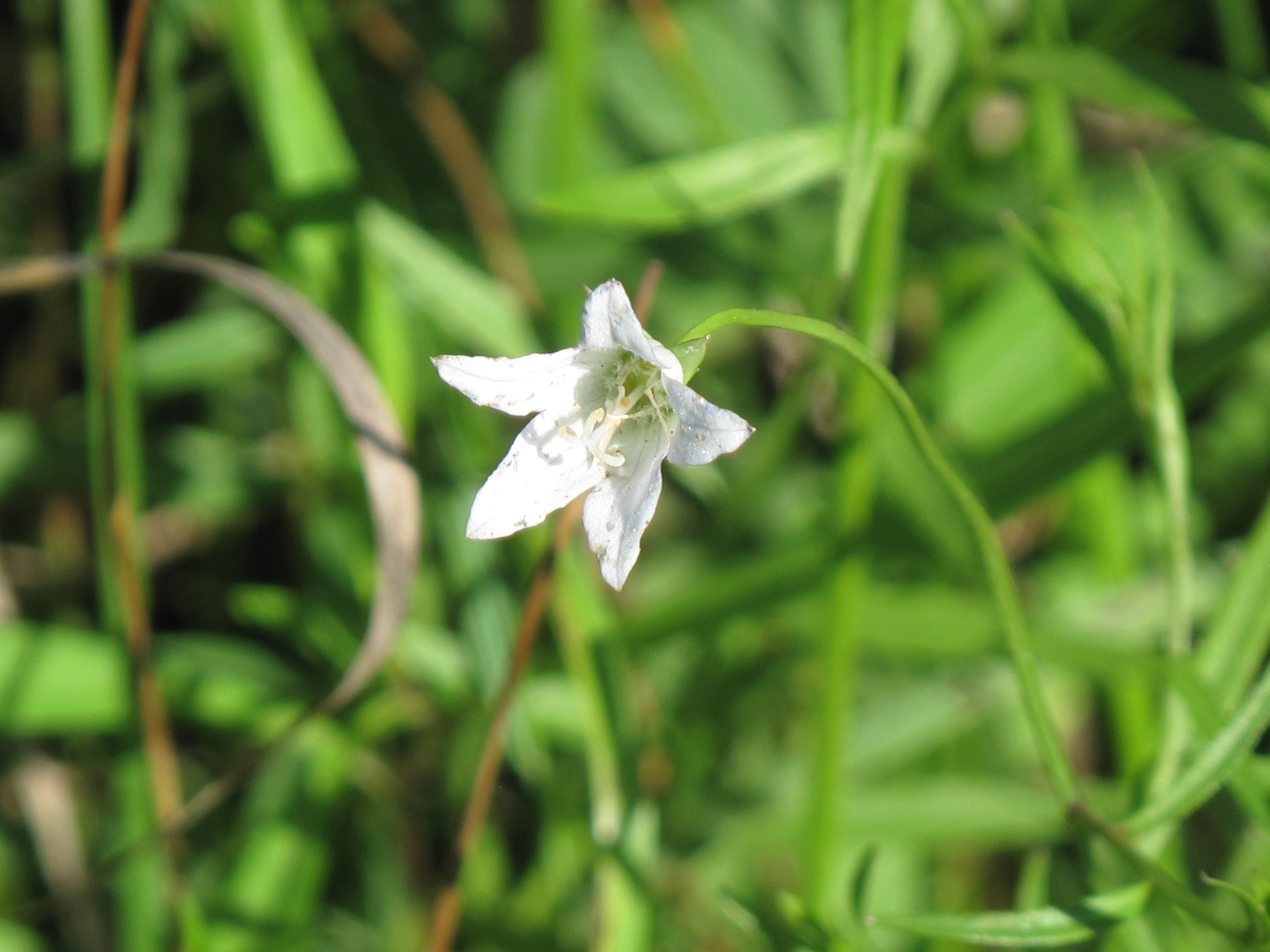
- Palustricodon aparinoides

Scientific classification
- Kingdom: Plantae
- Clade: Tracheophytes
- Clade: Angiosperms
- Clade: Eudicots
- Clade: Asterids
- Order: Asterales
- Family: Campanulaceae
- Genus: Palustricodon; Morin

Species
- Palustricodon aparinoides (Pursh) Morin; Palustricodon uliginosus (Rydb.) A.Haines

= Palustricodon =

Genus of flowering plants

Palustricodon is a genus of flowering plants in the family Campanulaceae. It includes two species native to central and eastern Canada and the eastern and central United States.

- Palustricodon aparinoides (Pursh) Morin – central and eastern Canada and the eastern and central United States
- Palustricodon uliginosus (Rydb.) A.Haines – central and eastern Canada and northeastern and north-central United States
