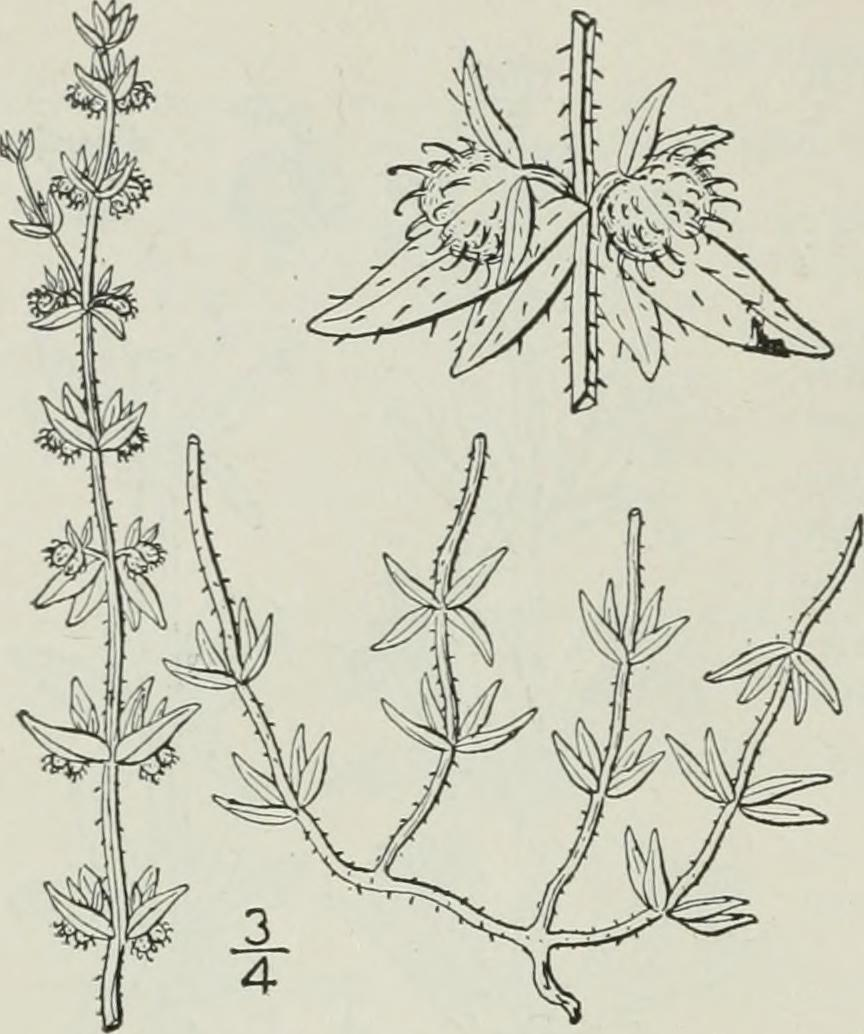
- Illustration of Galium virgatum

Scientific classification
- Kingdom: Plantae
- Clade: Tracheophytes
- Clade: Angiosperms
- Clade: Eudicots
- Clade: Asterids
- Order: Gentianales
- Family: Rubiaceae
- Genus: Galium
- Species: G. virgatum

Binomial name
- Galium virgatum Nutt. ex Torr. & A.Gray 1841

Synonyms
- Galium nutans Nutt.; Galium texanum Scheele; Galium virgatum var. leiocarpum Torr. & A.Gray

= Galium virgatum =

Southwestern bedstraw

Species of plant

Galium virgatum, common name southwestern bedstraw, is a North American species of plants in the Rubiaceae. It is native to the south-central part of the United States, primarily in the southern Great Plains from Texas to Missouri, but with scattered populations as far east as South Carolina.
