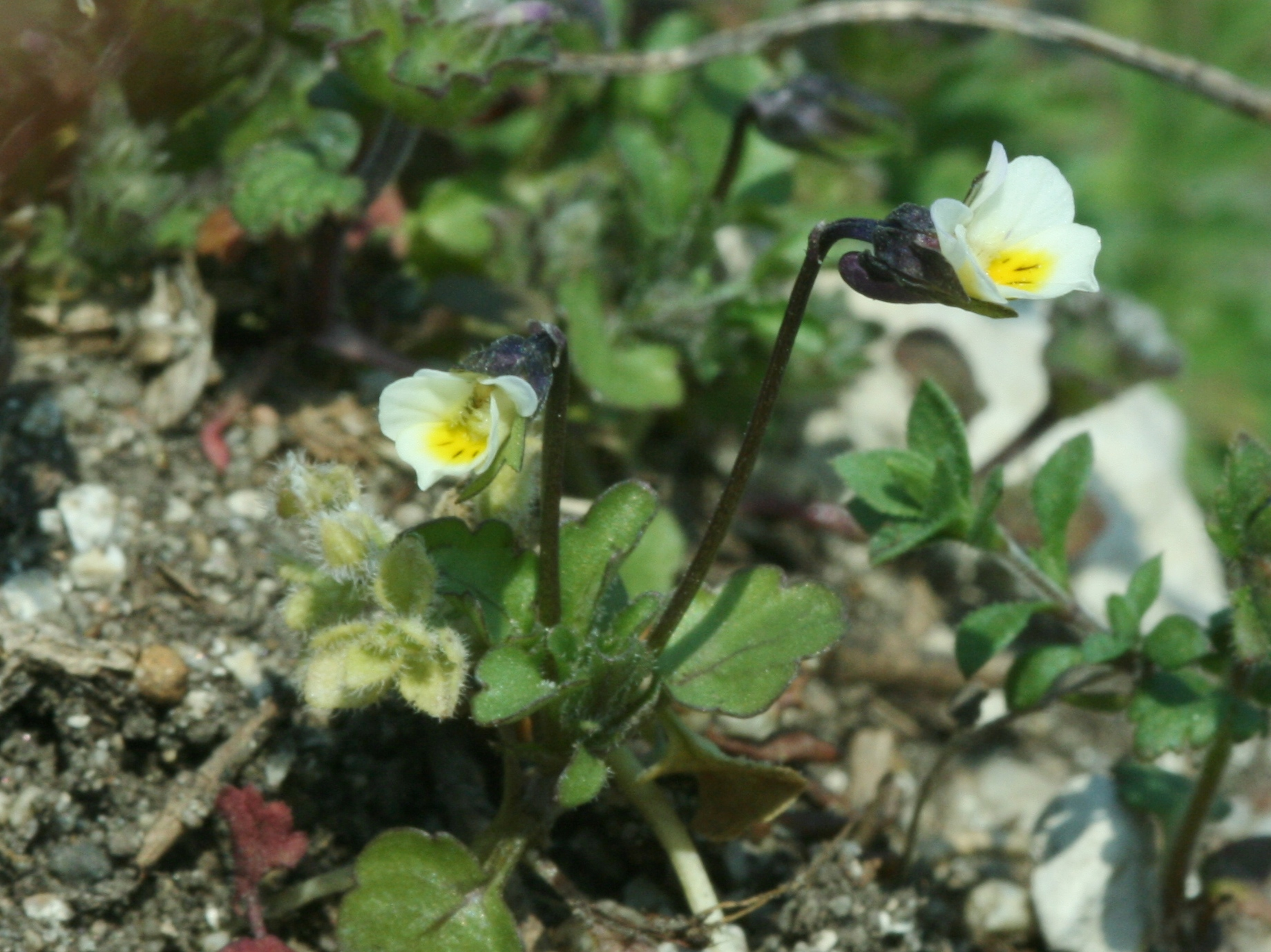

Scientific classification
- Kingdom: Plantae
- Clade: Tracheophytes
- Clade: Angiosperms
- Clade: Eudicots
- Clade: Rosids
- Order: Malpighiales
- Family: Violaceae
- Genus: Viola
- Species: V. kitaibeliana

Binomial name
- Viola kitaibeliana Schult.

Synonyms
- Viola arvensis subsp. kitaibeliana (Schult.) Mateo & Figuerola; Viola brachyantha Stapf; Viola karakalensis Klokov

= Viola kitaibeliana =

Species of flowering plant

Viola kitaibeliana, the dwarf violet, is a plant species in the genus Viola. It is native to a large area from the Canary Islands, across Europe, to northern Iran and southern Turkmenistan.

It is an annual, and requires disturbed or grazed soil to grow.

In 2021, two plants were discovered flowering on the 0.16 sq km island of Teän, in the Scilly Isles; the first seen there for 16 years.

== Taxonomy ==
Besides the nominate taxon, there are two other infraspecific taxa which are recognised in Plants of the World Online as of 2017:

- Viola kitaibeliana subsp. kitaibeliana
- Viola kitaibeliana subsp. machadiana (Cout.) Capelo & C.Aguiar
- Viola kitaibeliana subsp. trimestris (DC. ex Ging.) Espeut

== Description ==
This herbaceous plant is not higher than 12 cm. Like all violets the flowers are zygomorphic.
