= Galium texense =

Texas bedstraw

Scientific classification
- Kingdom: Plantae
- Clade: Tracheophytes
- Clade: Angiosperms
- Clade: Eudicots
- Clade: Asterids
- Order: Gentianales
- Family: Rubiaceae
- Genus: Galium
- Species: G. texense

Binomial name
- Galium texense A.Gray

Synonyms
- Galium californicum var. texanum Torr. & A. Gray 1841 not Galium texanum Scheele 1848; Galium texanum (Torr. & A. Gray) Wiegand 1903, illegitimate homonym; Galium uncinulatum A.Gray 1857, illegitimate homonym not DC. 1830

Species of plant

Galium texense, the Texas bedstraw, is a species of plants in the coffee family. It is native to Texas, Oklahoma and Arkansas.
