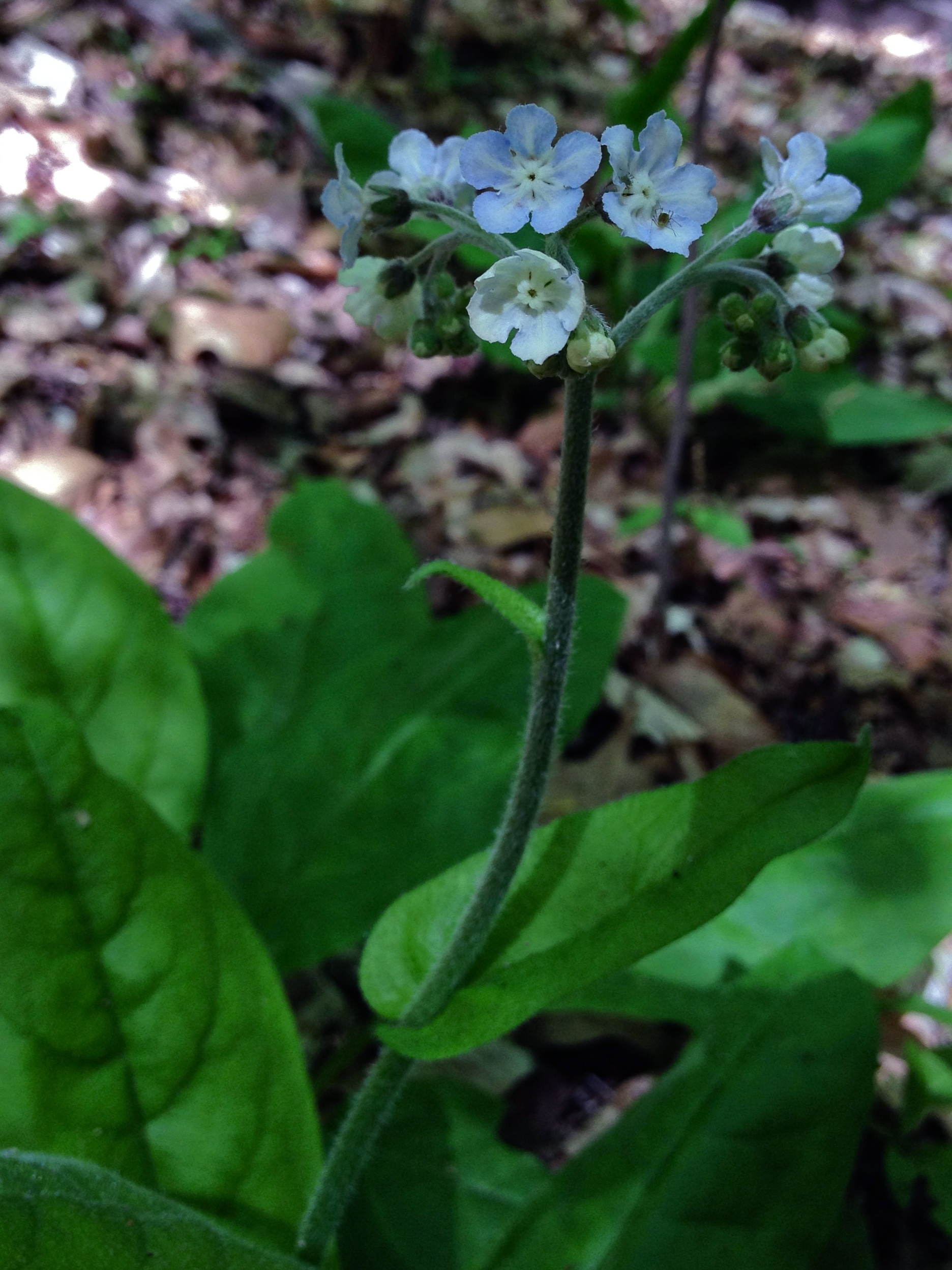

Conservation status
- Secure (NatureServe)

Scientific classification
- Kingdom: Plantae
- Clade: Tracheophytes
- Clade: Angiosperms
- Clade: Eudicots
- Clade: Asterids
- Order: Boraginales
- Family: Boraginaceae
- Genus: Andersonglossum
- Species: A. virginianum

Binomial name
- Andersonglossum virginianum (L.) J.I.Cohen

Synonyms
- Cynoglossum amplexicaule Michx.; Cynoglossum virginianum L.; Cynoglossum virginicum L.; Cynoglossum lucidum Stokes

= Andersonglossum virginianum =

Species of flowering plant

Andersonglossum virginianum, known as southern wild comfrey, is a flowering plant in the borage family native to North America. It is also sometimes called blue houndstongue.

Formerly placed in the genus Cynoglossum, it was transferred to the genus Andersonglossum in 2015.

== Distribution ==
Andersonglossum virginianum is native to the eastern United States. It densely populates the central and southeastern parts of the U.S. and is often found in open uplands, such as in southern New England, from New York to Illinois, Louisiana, Oklahoma, and from the south to Florida. A closely related species, Andersonglossum boreale, is disappearing from the southern part of its range in the United States.

== Description ==
Andersonglossum virginianum is an erect, unbranched perennial with rough fine hair on its leaves and stem. Their leaves are simple, entire, and have an alternate pattern. The leaves are denser at the lower end of the stem and they get smaller going up the stem. It has two to six racemes. The flowers have five deep lobes that are connected to a superior ovary which in turn is connected to the style. The flowers have rounded, light blue corollas that overlap each other. The corollas alternate with stamen with anthers.

Unlike A. virginianum, Andersonglossum boreale has petioles on its cauline leaves and its corolla lobes are not rounded and do not overlap. It, in general, is a smaller plant.

Pyrrolizidine alkaloids, hepatoxins capable of affecting grazing animals and humans, are synthesized by many borages including Andersonglossum officinale. Presumably this provides some protection against generalist herbivores. Botanists suspect that C. virginianum may also contain some of these alkaloids.

Leaves

- 10–20 cm long
- 2.5–7 cm wide
- Alternate
- Simple
- Entire
- Not margined
- Leaves get smaller going up the branch, towards the apical meristem

=== Reproduction ===
Andersonglossum virginianum forms above-ground foliage from a taproot every spring around May. Plants that do not flower grow more leaves in a rosette. The flowering stem grows from the center of the rosette. It is a monoecious plant which is self-compatible. It flowers from May to June and produces fruits from July to August. The flowers produce four grayish brown seeds that adhere to animals.

Flowers

- Flower size: 8–12 mm
- Flower color: Pale blue
- Pistil: superior ovary, deeply lobed into four parts.
- Corolla: 5-8mm wide, light blue, sympetalous, short tube, lobes oblong and do not overlap.
- Calyx: 1–3 mm

Fruit

- 1-4 nutlets per flower
- 3.5-5mm each with one seed
- prickly
- convex surface
- protruding horizontally
- no margin

== Medicinal uses ==
Herbalists from the nineteenth-century suggested that A. virginianum could be a replacement or a substitute for Symphytum officinale (also known as comfrey). A. virginianum was traditionally used to help treat wounds and to flush out any internal digestive disorders and respiratory infections. It also acts as a sedative medication.

Like many plants in the borage family traditionally used as medicine, A. virginianum is now known to contain pyrrolizidine alkaloids, compounds that can cause acute and chronic liver damage and cancer. Herbalists recommend avoiding internal usage and large or extended doses.
