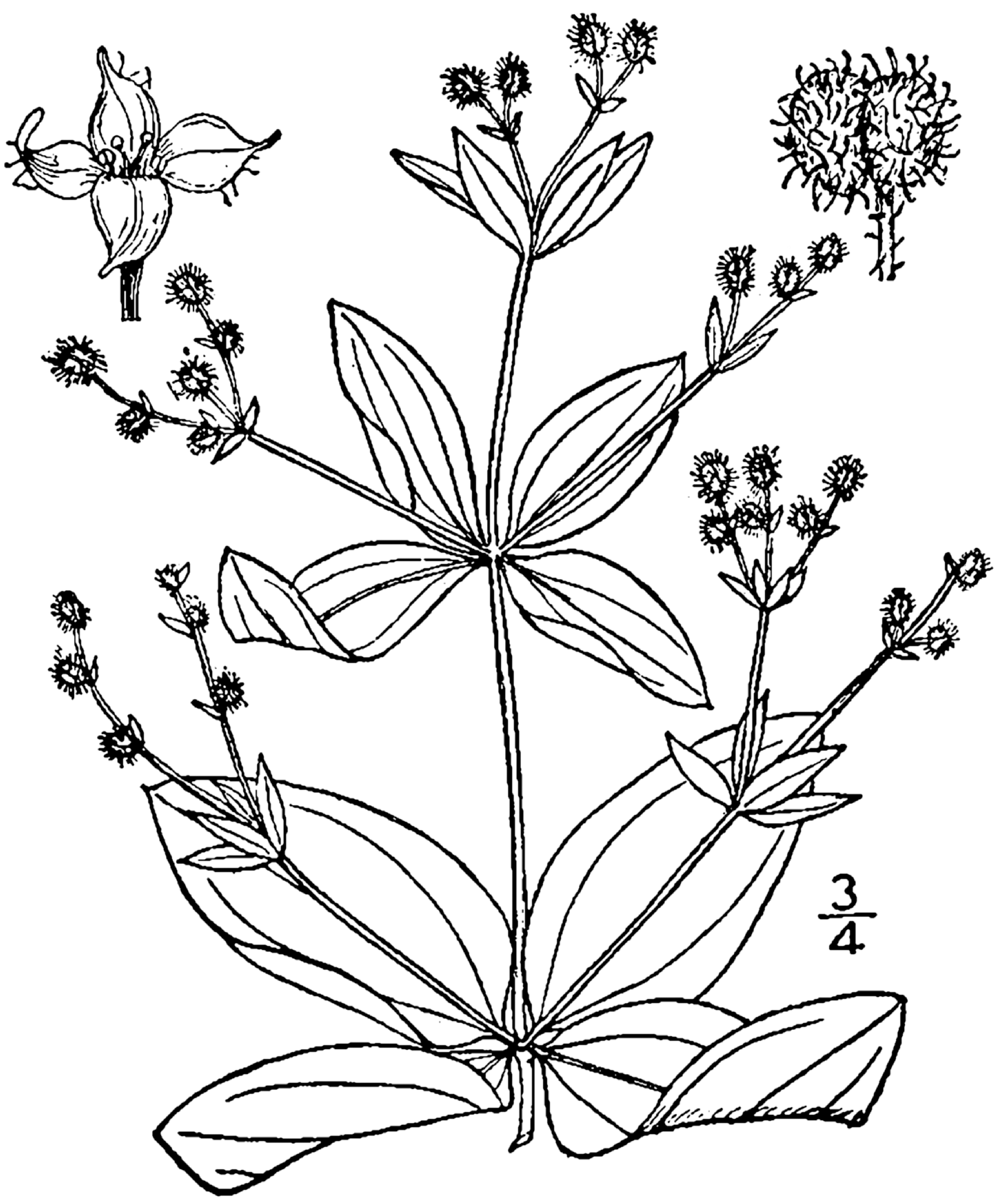

Scientific classification
- Kingdom: Plantae
- Clade: Tracheophytes
- Clade: Angiosperms
- Clade: Eudicots
- Clade: Asterids
- Order: Gentianales
- Family: Rubiaceae
- Genus: Galium
- Species: G. circaezans

Binomial name
- Galium circaezans Michx.

= Galium circaezans =

Species of plant

Galium circaezans, common name licorice bedstraw or wild licorice, is a plant species in the family Rubiaceae. It is native to the eastern half of the United States from the Great Plains to the Atlantic, plus Quebec and Ontario. There are also a few isolated populations in Washington state, probably adventive. Galium circaezans was originally described by André Michaux in Flora Boreali-Americana (published March 19, 1803). It is also known as white licorice, forest bedstraw, and more. Galium circaezans is a weedy, herbaceous perennial or subshrub. It is native to Central and Eastern North America. Other synonyms of Galium circaezans include Galium brachiatum Muhl. (Illegitimate), Galium circaeoides Roem. & Schult, and Galium rotundifolium var. circaezans (Michx.) Kuntze. Galium circaezans is not threatened to go extinct.

== Description ==
Galium circaezans reaches a height of about 1 to 2 feet and a spread of 1 to 2 feet. It blooms with tiny flowers that are sessile along the branches of each inflorescence from May to July. There are 3-4 greenish lobes on each flower. Each flower is about 1/8 of an inch across and is radially symmetrical. They each have a pair of styles, a double-ovoid ovary, 4-lobed greenish-white to greenish yellow corolla, and 4 stamens. When an ovary reaches maturity, it becomes a dry, spherical, indehiscent, reflexed, one-seeded fruit that is dark brown or black. They are also covered in hooked bristles that aid in dispersal. The fruit is dry but does not split open when ripe and is about 3 mm in length. Galium circaezans has pubescent, lanceolate to ovate green leaves in whorls of 4 and light green, square stems. The leaves are about 2.5 inches long, medium green, sparsely pubescent, has three prominent parallel veins, and are sessile. The margins of Galium circaezans leaves are entire.

Galium circaezans is most closely related to other Galium species that mostly have leaves whorled in groups of 4 (or rarely 5 or 6 in some species) at the primary nodes.

== Taxonomy ==
Galium circaezans is within the family Rubiaceae which is commonly referred to as the madder, coffee, and bedstraw family. Plants in Rubiaceae are characterized by opposite stipulate leaves, regular flowers with stamens borne on the corolla tube, and 1- to 10-celled ovaries with ovules that become a capsule, berry, or distinct nutlet. Galium L. is the largest genus in the Rubiaceae family with more than 600 species worldwide. It contains the bedstraws and is characterized by whorled leaves.

== Distribution and habitat ==
Galium circaezans is found in the lower 48 as well as parts of Canada and Alaska. It has been found throughout the Southeastern United States; as far west as Texas, Oklahoma, and Nebraska; and north into the Canadian provinces of Quebec and Ontario. Its habitat consists mainly of mesic to dry forests. It has been found in places like rich, loamy ravines; rich moist or dry woods; and dry wooded bluffs. Galium circaezans prefers partial shade, dry to medium amounts of water, has medium maintenance, and tolerates drought to dry soil. Galium circaezans wetland region status is FACU for the Arid West; Atlantic and Gulf Coastal Plain; Great Plains; Midwest; Northcentral & Northeast; and Western Mountains, Valleys, and Coast. Its wetland region status is UPL for Eastern Mountains and Piedmont.

== Dispersal ==
Galium circaezans is slowly spread via creeping rhizomes and/or self seeding. It is also dispersed by ants. The hooked bristles on the mature ovaries of G. circaezans also aid in dispersal by sticking to things like animal fur and human clothing in order to be distributed to a new location. Galium circaezans have elaiosomes that are structurally different from any that have been heretofore described. All Galium are didyrnous or twin-fruited. In Galium circaezans, only one of the fruits develop and the other fruit becomes an elaisome by developing into a small fleshy appendage. Typically, the second fruit would just abort.

== Varieties ==
Galium circaezans consists of two well geographically marked varieties: typicum and hypomalacum. The G. circaezans specimen collected from Cabell County, WV are a mixture of these two varieties. Galium circaezans var. hypomalacum is more northern, has lower leaf surface appressed-pilose, long hirsute in the veins, and larger leaves (2-5 cm long and 1-2.5 cm wide). Variety typicum have small and glabrous leaves. There is also another variety named Galium circaezans var. circaezans. This variety is more southern, has a lower leaf surface that are glabrous or sparsely short-hispid on the veins, and has larger leaves (1.5-2.5 cm long and 0.7-1.4 cm wide).

== Etymology ==
Galium comes from the Greek word gala, which means milk. This would also mean the plants that are used to curdle milk. The specific epithet circaezans comes from "Circaea" or "Circe". Circe was an enchantress of Greek mythology that was said to use the plant in her potions.
