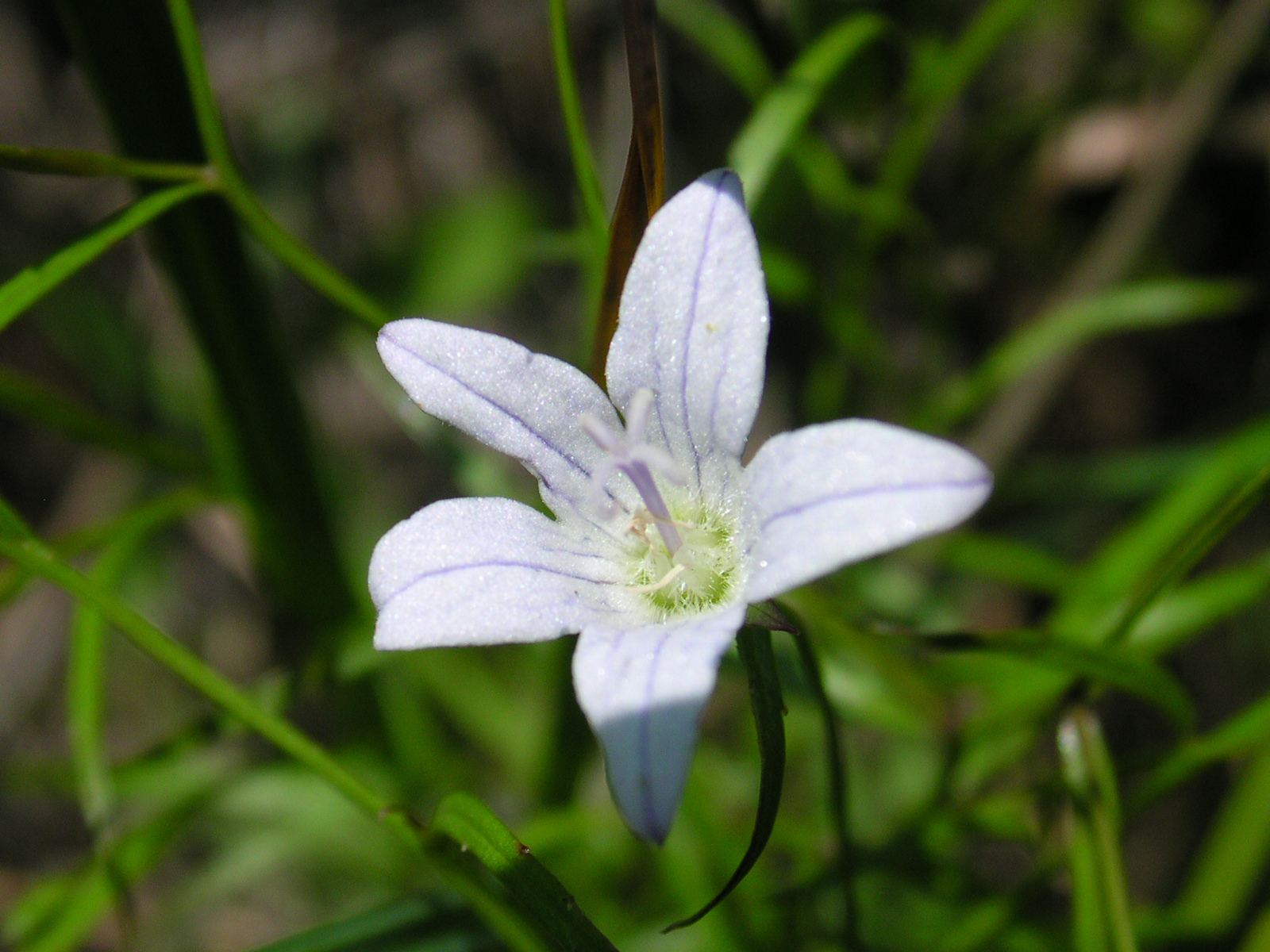
- Close-up of flower
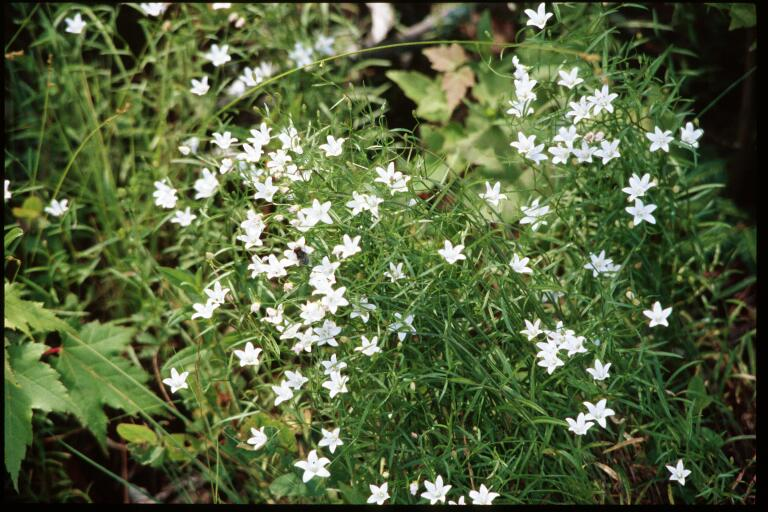
- In the Superior National Forest

Conservation status
- Least Concern (IUCN 3.1)

Scientific classification
- Kingdom: Plantae
- Clade: Tracheophytes
- Clade: Angiosperms
- Clade: Eudicots
- Clade: Asterids
- Order: Asterales
- Family: Campanulaceae
- Genus: Palustricodon
- Species: P. aparinoides

Binomial name
- Palustricodon aparinoides (Pursh) Morin

Synonyms
- Campanula aparinoides Pursh; Campanula aparinoides var. erinoides Alph.Wood; Campanula aparinoides var. multiflora A.DC.; Campanula aparinoides var. rosea Coleman; Campanula erinoides Muhl.

= Palustricodon aparinoides =

Species of plant

Palustricodon aparinoides, the marsh bellflower, is a species of flowering plant in the family Campanulaceae. It is native to cool-temperate areas of central and eastern Canada and the north-central and eastern United States, and it has been introduced to Washington state and Finland. A perennial herb, it is an obligate wetland species. Under its synonym Campanula aparinoides it has been assessed as Least Concern.
