= List of Verbascum species =

The following species in the flowering plant genus Verbascum, the mulleins, are accepted by Plants of the World Online. Verbascum has recently undergone rapid radiation.

== A ==
- Verbascum × abandense Hub.-Mor.
- Verbascum abieticola Bornm.
- Verbascum abyadicum Hemaid
- Verbascum acaule (Bory & Chaub.) Kuntze
- Verbascum adamovicii Velen.
- Verbascum adeliae Heldr.
- Verbascum adenanthum Bornm.
- Verbascum adenocarpum Hub.-Mor.
- Verbascum adenocaulon Boiss. & Balansa
- Verbascum adenophorum Boiss. & Balansa
- Verbascum adrianopolitanum Podp.
- Verbascum adzharicum P.P.Gritz.
- Verbascum afyonense Hub.-Mor.
- Verbascum agastachyum Hub.-Mor.
- Verbascum agrimoniifolium (K.Koch) Hub.-Mor.
- Verbascum akdarense (Murb.) Hub.-Mor.
- Verbascum akhalkalakiense Bordz.
- Verbascum albidiflorum Ranjbar & Nouri
- Verbascum alceoides Boiss. & Hausskn.
- Verbascum alepense Benth.
- Verbascum aliciae Post
- Verbascum alpigenum K.Koch
- Verbascum alyssifolium Boiss.
- Verbascum × amaliense Rech.f.
- Verbascum amanum Boiss.
- Verbascum × ambigens Hausskn.
- Verbascum × ambiguum Lej.
- Verbascum × ambracicum Halácsy
- Verbascum anastasii Nábelek
- Verbascum ancyritanum Bornm.
- Verbascum andrusii Post
- Verbascum anisophyllum Murb.
- Verbascum antari Post
- Verbascum antilibanoticum Hub.-Mor.
- Verbascum antinori Boiss. & Heldr.
- Verbascum antiochium Boiss. & Heldr.
- Verbascum antitauricum Hub.-Mor.
- Verbascum aphentulium Heldr.
- Verbascum apiculatum Hub.-Mor.
- Verbascum aqranse Al-Bermani & Al-Musawi
- Verbascum × arabkirense Hub.-Mor.
- Verbascum × araratense Hub.-Mor.
- Verbascum arbelense Bornm.
- Verbascum arbusculum (A.Rich.) Hub.-Mor.
- Verbascum × arctotrichum Murb.
- Verbascum arcturus L.
- Verbascum × arenicola Hub.-Mor.
- Verbascum argenteum Ten.
- Verbascum armenum Boiss. & Kotschy
- Verbascum × arpaczajicum Bordz.
- Verbascum artvinense E.Wulff
- Verbascum aschersonii Boiss. & Sint. ex Murb.
- Verbascum asiricum Hemaid
- Verbascum asperuloides Hub.-Mor.
- Verbascum assurense Bornm. & Hand.-Mazz.
- Verbascum × atchleyianum Rech.f.
- Verbascum atlanticum Batt.
- Verbascum atroviolaceum (Sommier & Levier) Murb.
- Verbascum aucheri (Boiss.) Hub.-Mor.
- Verbascum auriculatum Sm.
- Verbascum × austroanatolicum Hub.-Mor.
- Verbascum austroiranicum Hub.-Mor.
- Verbascum aydogdui Karavel., Vural, B.Sahin & Aslan
- Verbascum azerbaijanense

Sharifnia & Assadi

== B ==
- Verbascum baldaccii Degen
- Verbascum × balikesirense Hub.-Mor.
- Verbascum ballii (Batt.) Hub.-Mor.
- Verbascum ballsianum Murb.
- Verbascum banaticum Schrad.
- Verbascum barbeyi Post
- Verbascum barnadesii Vahl
- Verbascum basivelatum Hub.-Mor.
- Verbascum × bastardii Roem. & Schult.
- Verbascum battandieri (Murb.) Hub.-Mor.
- Verbascum × baumgartnerianum Rech.f.
- Verbascum bellum Hub.-Mor.
- Verbascum benthamianum Hepper
- Verbascum beryteum Boiss.
- Verbascum betonicifolium (Desf.) Desf.
- Verbascum biledschikianum Bornm.
- Verbascum × binbogense Hub.-Mor.
- Verbascum birandianum Hub.-Mor.
- Verbascum biscutellifolium Benth.
- Verbascum bithynicum Boiss.
- Verbascum × bitlisianum Hub.-Mor.
- Verbascum blancheanum Boiss.
- Verbascum blattaria L.
- Verbascum boerhavii L.
- Verbascum boevae Stef.-Gat.
- Verbascum boissieri (Heldr. & Sart. ex Boiss.) Kuntze
- Verbascum bombyciferum Boiss.
- Verbascum × borbasianum Soó
- Verbascum bornmuellerianum Hub.-Mor.
- Verbascum botuliforme Murb.
- Verbascum bourgeauanum Hub.-Mor.
- Verbascum bracteosum Freyn & Sint.
- Verbascum × brockmuelleri Ruhmer
- Verbascum bugulifolium Lam.
- Verbascum × bulanikense Hub.-Mor.
- Verbascum × burdurense Hub.-Mor.

== C ==
- Verbascum caesareum Boiss.
- Verbascum × calcicola Hub.-Mor.
- Verbascum calvum Boiss. & Kotschy
- Verbascum calycinum Ball
- Verbascum calycosum Hausskn. ex Murb.
- Verbascum campestre Boiss. & Heldr.
- Verbascum × candelabrum Kar. & Kir.
- Verbascum capitis-viridis Hub.-Mor.
- Verbascum cappadocicum Bornm.
- Verbascum carduchorum Bornm.
- Verbascum cariense Hub.-Mor.
- Verbascum × carinthiacum Fritsch
- Verbascum carmanicum (Bornm.) Hub.-Mor.
- Verbascum caudatum Freyn & Bornm.
- Verbascum cedreti Boiss.
- Verbascum × cephalariense Hub.-Mor. & Rech.f.
- Verbascum cerinum Boiss. & Heldr.
- Verbascum × cernyi Rohlena
- Verbascum chaixii Vill.
- Verbascum charidemi Murb.
- Verbascum charputense Murb.
- Verbascum chaudharyanum Hemaid
- Verbascum chazaliei H.Boissieu
- Verbascum cheiranthifolium Boiss.
- Verbascum chionophyllum Hub.-Mor.
- Verbascum chiovendae Hub.-Mor.
- Verbascum × chium Rech.f.
- Verbascum chlorostegium Bornm. & Murb.
- Verbascum chrysochaete Stapf
- Verbascum × chrysopolitanum Rech.f.
- Verbascum chrysorrhacos Boiss.
- Verbascum cicekdagensis Karavel. & Vural
- Verbascum cilicicum Boiss.
- Verbascum cilicium (Boiss. & Heldr.) Kuntze
- Verbascum × clinantherum Bordz.
- Verbascum × coenobitanum Hausskn. & Heldr.
- Verbascum × congestum Huter
- Verbascum conocarpum Moris
- Verbascum corinthiacum Kit Tan, Zarkos, V.Christodoulou & Vold
- Verbascum coromandelianum (Vahl) Hub.-Mor.
- Verbascum coronopifolium (Boiss. & Balansa) Kuntze
- Verbascum × coum Rech.f.
- Verbascum × crenulatum Hub.-Mor.
- Verbascum creticum (L.) Cav.
- Verbascum cucullatibracteum Hub.-Mor.
- Verbascum cylindrocarpum Griseb.
- Verbascum cylleneum (Boiss. & Heldr.) Kuntze
- Verbascum cymigerum Hub.-Mor.
- Verbascum cystolithicum (Pett.) Hub.-Mor.

== D ==
- Verbascum daenzeri (Fauché & Chaub.) Fenzl
- Verbascum dalamanicum Hub.-Mor.
- Verbascum damascenum Boiss.
- Verbascum × danubiale Simonk.
- Verbascum davidoffii Murb.
- Verbascum davisianum Hub.-Mor.
- Verbascum decaisneanum Kuntze
- Verbascum × decalvans Borbás
- Verbascum decorum Velen.
- Verbascum decursivum Hub.-Mor.
- Verbascum × degenianum Soó
- Verbascum delphicum Boiss. & Heldr.
- Verbascum demirizianum Hub.-Mor.
- Verbascum densiflorum Bertol.
- Verbascum dentifolium Delile
- Verbascum × denudatum Pfund
- Verbascum × derekolense Rech.f.
- Verbascum × dervichorum Hausskn. & Heldr.
- Verbascum detersile Boiss. & Heldr.
- Verbascum dieckianum Borbás & Degen
- Verbascum × digitalifolium Boiss. & Hausskn.
- Verbascum dimoniei Velen.
- Verbascum dingleri Mattf. & Stef.
- Verbascum × diphyon Franch.
- Verbascum × dirmilense Hub.-Mor.
- Verbascum × dirupatae Huter
- Verbascum discolor Murb.
- Verbascum disjectum (Murb.) Hub.-Mor.
- Verbascum × divaricatum Kitt.
- Verbascum diversifolium Hochst.
- Verbascum × dobrogense Prodan
- Verbascum × doiranense Bornm.
- Verbascum × dominii Rohlena
- Verbascum × dramense Rech.f.
- Verbascum drymophilum Hub.-Mor.
- Verbascum drymophyloides P.P.Gritz.
- Verbascum × duernsteinense Teyber
- Verbascum dumulosum P.H.Davis & Hub.-Mor.
- Verbascum × dupnicense Murb.
- Verbascum durmitoreum Rohlena
- Verbascum duzgunbabadagensis Karavel. & E.Yüce

== E ==
- Verbascum × edessanum Hub.-Mor. & Rech.f.
- Verbascum × edremiticum Sutorý
- Verbascum × eginense Hub.-Mor.
- Verbascum × elasigense Hub.-Mor.
- Verbascum elegantulum Hub.-Mor.
- Verbascum eleonorae Hub.-Mor.
- Verbascum epixanthinum Boiss. & Heldr.
- Verbascum eremobium Murb.
- Verbascum ergin-hamzaoglui Karavel.
- Verbascum erianthum Benth.
- Verbascum eriocarpum (Freyn & Sint.) Bornm.
- Verbascum eriophorum Godr.
- Verbascum eriorrhabdon Boiss.
- Verbascum erivanicum E.Wulff
- Verbascum × ermenekense Hub.-Mor.
- Verbascum erosum Cav.
- Verbascum × erraticum Hausskn.
- Verbascum × ersin-yucelii Karavel.
- Verbascum × erzindschanense Hub.-Mor.
- Verbascum eskisehirensis Karavel., Ocak & Ekici
- Verbascum euboicum Murb. & Rech.f.
- Verbascum euphraticum Benth.
- Verbascum exuberans Hub.-Mor.

== F ==
- Verbascum faik-karaveliogullarii Çingay & Cabi
- Verbascum × fallax Freyn & Sint.
- Verbascum farsistanicum (Murb.) Hub.-Mor.
- Verbascum faurei (Murb.) Hub.-Mor.
- Verbascum × festii Hayek
- Verbascum flavidum (Boiss.) Freyn & Bornm.
- Verbascum flavipannosum Hub.-Mor.
- Verbascum × florinense Hub.-Mor. & Rech.f.
- Verbascum × fluminense A.Kern. ex Nyman
- Verbascum foetidum Boiss. & Heldr.
- Verbascum fontqueri Benedí & J.M.Monts.
- Verbascum formosum Fisch. ex Schrank
- Verbascum × fragriforme Pfund
- Verbascum × freynianum Borbás
- Verbascum freynii (Sint.) Murb.
- Verbascum × fridae Murb.
- Verbascum froedinii Murb.
- Verbascum fruticulosum Post

== G ==
- Verbascum gabrieliae (Bornm.) Hub.-Mor.
- Verbascum × gabrielianae (Hub.-Mor.) Hub.-Mor.
- Verbascum gaetulum (Maire) Murb.
- Verbascum gaillardotii Boiss.
- Verbascum galilaeum Boiss.
- Verbascum × geminatum Freyn
- Verbascum geminiflorum Hochst.
- Verbascum georgicum Benth.
- Verbascum germaniciae Hausskn. ex Boiss.
- Verbascum giganteum Willk.
- Verbascum gilanicum Mozaff.
- Verbascum gimgimense Firat
- Verbascum × gintlii Rohlena
- Verbascum × giresunense Hub.-Mor.
- Verbascum glabratum Friv.
- Verbascum glanduliferum (Post) Hub.-Mor.
- Verbascum glandulosum Delile
- Verbascum globiferum Hub.-Mor.
- Verbascum globiflorum Boiss. & Noë
- Verbascum glomeratum Boiss.
- Verbascum glomerulosum Hub.-Mor.
- Verbascum gnaphalodes M.Bieb.
- Verbascum × godronii Boreau
- Verbascum × goeldschuekense Hub.-Mor.
- Verbascum golawanense Firat
- Verbascum gossypinum M.Bieb.
- Verbascum gracilescens Hub.-Mor.
- Verbascum graecum Heldr. & Sart.
- Verbascum × guelnarense Hub.-Mor.
- Verbascum guicciardii Heldr.
- Verbascum gypsicola Vural & Aydogdu

== H ==
- Verbascum hadschinense Freyn & Sint.
- Verbascum haesarense Freyn & Bornm.
- Verbascum hajastanicum Bordz.
- Verbascum halacsyanum Sint. & Bornm. ex Halácsy
- Verbascum haraldi-adnani Parolly & Eren
- Verbascum hasbenlii Aytaç & H.Duman
- Verbascum × hatayense Hub.-Mor.
- Verbascum haussknechtianum Hub.-Mor.
- Verbascum haussknechtii Heldr. ex Hausskn.
- Verbascum × haynaldianum Borbás
- Verbascum helianthemoides Hub.-Mor.
- Verbascum hema-figranum Hemaid
- Verbascum hervieri Degen
- Verbascum herzogii Bornm.
- Verbascum heterobarbatum Hub.-Mor.
- Verbascum heterodontum Hub.-Mor.
- Verbascum hookerianum Ball
- Verbascum × horakii Rohlena
- Verbascum × horticola Hub.-Mor.
- Verbascum humile Janka
- Verbascum × humnickii Franch.
- Verbascum × hybridum Brot.
- Verbascum hypoleucum Boiss. & Heldr.

== I ==
- Verbascum ibrahim-belenlii Karavel.
- Verbascum iconium Hub.-Mor.
- Verbascum ifranensis Khamar, Civeyrel, Pelissier, Badr, El Oualidi & Touhami-Ouaz
- Verbascum × ignescens Tausch
- Verbascum ikaricum Murb.
- Verbascum × ilgazdagense Hub.-Mor.
- Verbascum inaequale Freyn & Sint.
- Verbascum × incanum Gaudin
- Verbascum × inegoelense Hub.-Mor.
- Verbascum × inexspectatum Rech.f.
- Verbascum infidelium Boiss. & Hausskn.
- Verbascum × innominatum Rech.f.
- Verbascum × insignitum Beck
- Verbascum insulare Boiss. & Heldr.
- Verbascum × interjectum Pfund
- Verbascum × intermedium Rupr. ex Pfund
- Verbascum interruptum (Fresen.) Kuntze
- Verbascum intricatum (Benth.) Kuntze
- Verbascum × inulifolioides Hub.-Mor.
- Verbascum inulifolium Hub.-Mor.
- Verbascum isauricum Boiss. & Heldr.
- Verbascum × isfendiyarense Hub.-Mor.
- Verbascum × iskenderunense Hub.-Mor.
- Verbascum × ispartense Hub.-Mor.

== J ==
- Verbascum jankaeanum Pancic
- Verbascum × johannis-zernyi Murb.
- Verbascum jordanicum Murb.
- Verbascum jordanovii Stef.-Gat.
- Verbascum josgadense Murb.
- Verbascum juruk Stef.

== K ==
- Verbascum × kalabakense Hub.-Mor. & Rech.f.
- Verbascum × karaboertlenense Hub.-Mor.
- Verbascum × karadagense Hub.-Mor.
- Verbascum × karlikdaghense Rech.f.
- Verbascum × karpatii Boros
- Verbascum kastamunicum Murb.
- Verbascum × kavallense Rech.f.
- Verbascum × kavinae Rohlena
- Verbascum × kayseriense Hub.-Mor.
- Verbascum × keklikolukense Hub.-Mor.
- Verbascum × kemerense Hub.-Mor.
- Verbascum × kerneri Borbás
- Verbascum kochiiforme Boiss. & Hausskn.
- Verbascum korovinii P.P.Gritz.
- Verbascum × korphiaticum Hub.-Mor. & Rech.f.
- Verbascum kotschyi Boiss. & Hohen.
- Verbascum × kozaniense Hub.-Mor. & Rech.f.
- Verbascum krauseanum Murb.
- Verbascum × krokeense Hub.-Mor. & Rech.f.
- Verbascum × kubedagense Hub.-Mor.
- Verbascum × kuetahyense Hub.-Mor.
- Verbascum kurdicum Hub.-Mor.
- Verbascum kurdistanicum Firat

== L ==
- Verbascum lachnopus Hub.-Mor.
- Verbascum laetum Boiss. & Hausskn.
- Verbascum lagurus Fisch. & C.A.Mey.
- Verbascum lanatum Schrad.
- Verbascum × laramberguei Rouy
- Verbascum × lasianthiforme Hub.-Mor.
- Verbascum lasianthum Boiss. ex Benth.
- Verbascum latisepalum Hub.-Mor.
- Verbascum leianthoides Murb.
- Verbascum leianthum Benth.
- Verbascum × leilense Rech.f.
- Verbascum leiocarpum Murb.
- Verbascum leiocladum Murb.
- Verbascum × lemaitrei Boreau
- Verbascum leptocladum Boiss. & Heldr.
- Verbascum leptostachyon DC.
- Verbascum letourneuxii Asch.
- Verbascum leuconeurum Boiss. & Heldr.
- Verbascum × leucophylloides Hub.-Mor. & Rech.f.
- Verbascum leucophyllum Griseb.
- Verbascum levanticum I.K.Ferguson
- Verbascum libanoticum Murb. & J.Thiébaut
- Verbascum limnense Fraas
- Verbascum lindae Parolly & Kit Tan
- Verbascum linearilobum (Boiss.) Hub.-Mor.
- Verbascum linguifolium Hub.-Mor.
- Verbascum litigiosum Samp.
- Verbascum lobatum Hub.-Mor.
- Verbascum × lobulatum Hub.-Mor.
- Verbascum × longeracemosum Chaub.
- Verbascum longibracteatum Deflers
- Verbascum longifolium Ten.
- Verbascum longipedicellatum Hub.-Mor.
- Verbascum longirostre (Murb.) Hub.-Mor.
- Verbascum luciliae (Boiss.) Kuntze
- Verbascum luntii Baker
- Verbascum luridiflorum Hub.-Mor.
- Verbascum lychnitis L.
- Verbascum lydium Boiss.
- Verbascum lyprocarpum (Murb.) Hub.-Mor.
- Verbascum lyratifolium W.D.J.Koch ex Benth.
- Verbascum lysiosepalum Hub.-Mor.

== M ==
- Verbascum macedonicum Kosonin & Murb.
- Verbascum × macilentum Franch.
- Verbascum macrocarpum Boiss.
- Verbascum macrosepalum Boiss. & Kotschy ex Murb.
- Verbascum macrurum Ten.
- Verbascum maeandri Bornm.
- Verbascum × maeandriforme Hub.-Mor.
- Verbascum mairei (Murb.) Hub.-Mor.
- Verbascum mallophorum Boiss. & Heldr.
- Verbascum maroccanum (Ball) Hub.-Mor.
- Verbascum × martini Franch.
- Verbascum masguindalii (Pau) Benedí & J.M.Monts.
- Verbascum maurum Maire & Murb.
- Verbascum mecit-vuralii Karavel.
- Verbascum medinecum Hemaid
- Verbascum megricum (Tzvelev) Hub.-Mor.
- Verbascum meinckeanum Murb.
- Verbascum melhanense (Murb.) Hub.-Mor.
- Verbascum melitenense Hub.-Mor.
- Verbascum microsepalum Hub.-Mor.
- Verbascum × mirabile (Rech.f. & Hub.-Mor.) Hub.-Mor.
- Verbascum misirdalianum Karavel., Çeçen & Ünal
- Verbascum × mixtum Ramond ex DC.
- Verbascum × montenegrinum Sagorski ex Murb.
- Verbascum × morronense Huter
- Verbascum × mucronatiforme Hub.-Mor.
- Verbascum mucronatum Lam.
- Verbascum mughlaeum H.Duman, Uzunh. & Kit Tan
- Verbascum × muglense Hub.-Mor. & Reese
- Verbascum murbeckianum Hub.-Mor.
- Verbascum × murbeckii Teyber
- Verbascum × mutense Hub.-Mor.
- Verbascum mykales Bornm.
- Verbascum myrianthum Boiss.
- Verbascum × myriocarpoides Hub.-Mor.
- Verbascum myriocarpum Boiss. & Heldr.
- Verbascum × mytilinense Rech.f.

== N ==
- Verbascum napifolium Boiss.
- Verbascum natolicum (Fisch. & C.A.Mey.) Hub.-Mor.
- Verbascum × neilreichii Reichardt
- Verbascum nevadense Boiss.
- Verbascum nicolai Rohlena
- Verbascum nigrum L.
- Verbascum nihatgoekyigitii Karavel. & Çingay
- Verbascum niveum Ten.
- Verbascum nobile Velen.
- Verbascum × nothum W.D.J.Koch
- Verbascum × nudatiforme Hub.-Mor.
- Verbascum nudatum Murb.
- Verbascum nudicaule (Wydler) Takht.
- Verbascum nudiusculum Hub.-Mor.
- Verbascum × nusaybinense Hub.-Mor.
- Verbascum × nydeggeri Hub.-Mor.

== O ==
- Verbascum × obtusifoliiforme Sutorý
- Verbascum × obtusifolioides Hub.-Mor.
- Verbascum obtusifolium Hub.-Mor.
- Verbascum olympicum Boiss.
- Verbascum omanense Hub.-Mor.
- Verbascum × omissum Sutorý
- Verbascum oocarpum Murb.
- Verbascum orbicularifolium Hub.-Mor.
- Verbascum × ordymnense Rech.f.
- Verbascum oreodoxa Hub.-Mor.
- Verbascum × oreodoxiforme Hub.-Mor.
- Verbascum oreophilum K.Koch
- Verbascum orgyale Boiss. & Heldr.
- Verbascum orientale (L.) All.
- Verbascum orphanideum Murb.
- Verbascum ovalifolium Donn ex Sims
- Verbascum ozturkii Karavel., Uzunh. & S.Çelik

== P ==
- Verbascum pallidiflorum Hub.-Mor.
- Verbascum palmyrense Post
- Verbascum × pancicii Bornm.
- Verbascum pangaeum Murb. & Rech.f.
- Verbascum paniculatum E.Wulff
- Verbascum × paphlagonicum Bornm.
- Verbascum × paradoxum Hausskn.
- Verbascum × parallelum Hausskn.
- Verbascum parsana Sotoodeh, Attar & Civeyrel
- Verbascum × parvifloriforme Hub.-Mor. & Nydegger
- Verbascum parviflorum Lam.
- Verbascum × patris (Bordz.) Bordz.
- Verbascum pedunculosum (Hochst. & Steud. ex Benth.) Kuntze
- Verbascum × pelitnopilodes Murb. & Rech.
- Verbascum pellitum Hub.-Mor.
- Verbascum pentelicum Murb.
- Verbascum peraffine (Rech.f.) Zograf. & Strid
- Verbascum pestalozzae Boiss.
- Verbascum petiolare Boiss. & Kotschy
- Verbascum petrae P.H.Davis & Hub.-Mor.
- Verbascum × phalereum Hausskn.
- Verbascum × philippiense Rech.f.
- Verbascum phlomoides L.
- Verbascum × phoeniceiforme Rothm.
- Verbascum phoeniceum L.
- Verbascum phrygium Bornm.
- Verbascum phyllostachyum Boiss. & Hausskn.
- Verbascum pinardii Boiss.
- Verbascum pinetorum (Boiss.) Kuntze
- Verbascum pinnatifidum Vahl
- Verbascum pinnatisectum (Batt.) Benedí
- Verbascum piscicidum Candargy
- Verbascum × pobicum Sutorý
- Verbascum × polyphyllopyramidatum Bordz.
- Verbascum ponticum (Boiss.) Kuntze
- Verbascum porteri Post
- Verbascum postianum Murb.
- Verbascum × pozanticum Hub.-Mor.
- Verbascum × praetutianum Huter
- Verbascum × prokopiense Hub.-Mor. & Rech.f.
- Verbascum protractum Fenzl
- Verbascum prunellii Rodr.Gracia & Valdés Berm.
- Verbascum × prusianiforme Hub.-Mor.
- Verbascum prusianum Boiss.
- Verbascum × pseudobanaticum Hub.-Mor. & Rech.f.
- Verbascum × pseudoblattaria (Gaudin) Schleich. ex W.D.J.Koch
- Verbascum × pseudochrysochaete Hub.-Mor.
- Verbascum pseudocreticum Benedí & J.M.Monts.
- Verbascum pseudodigitalis Nábelek
- Verbascum × pseudogeorgicum Hub.-Mor.
- Verbascum × pseudohajastanicum Hub.-Mor.
- Verbascum pseudoholotrichum Hub.-Mor.
- Verbascum × pseudolychnitis Schur
- Verbascum × pseudolydium Hub.-Mor.
- Verbascum pseudonobile Stoj. & Stef.
- Verbascum × pseudopterocalycinum Hub.-Mor.
- Verbascum × pseudosinuatum Hausskn.
- Verbascum × pseudosoongaricum Hub.-Mor.
- Verbascum × pseudospeciosum Rech.f.
- Verbascum × pseudothapsus Hub.-Mor.
- Verbascum pseudovarians Hub.-Mor.
- Verbascum × pterocalyciniforme Hub.-Mor.
- Verbascum pterocalycinum Hub.-Mor.
- Verbascum × pterocaulon Franch.
- Verbascum pterocladum Hub.-Mor.
- Verbascum ptychophyllum Boiss.
- Verbascum pubescens (Skan) Hub.-Mor.
- Verbascum pulverulentum Vill.
- Verbascum pumiliforme Hub.-Mor.
- Verbascum pumilum Boiss. & Heldr.
- Verbascum punalense Boiss. & Buhse
- Verbascum purpureum (Janka) Hub.-Mor.
- Verbascum pycnostachyum Boiss. & Heldr.
- Verbascum pyramidatum M.Bieb.
- Verbascum pyroliforme (Boiss. & Heldr.) Kuntze
- Verbascum × quercetorum Hub.-Mor.

== Q ==
- Verbascum qulebicum Post

== R ==
- Verbascum racemiferum Boiss. & Hausskn.
- Verbascum × ramigerum Link ex Schrad.
- Verbascum reeseanum Hub.-Mor.
- Verbascum × regelianum Wirtg.
- Verbascum reiseri Halácsy
- Verbascum renzii Hub.-Mor.
- Verbascum × rhodium Rech.f.
- Verbascum × rilaense Murb.
- Verbascum × roopianum Bordz. ex Murb.
- Verbascum roripifolium (Halácsy) I.K.Ferguson
- Verbascum rotundifolium Ten.
- Verbascum × rubiginosum Waldst. & Kit.
- Verbascum rubricaule Boiss. & Heldr.
- Verbascum × rumiciforme O.Schwarz
- Verbascum rupestre (Davidov) I.K.Ferguson
- Verbascum rupicola (Hayek & Siehe) Hub.-Mor.
- Verbascum × ruscinonense Rouy

== S ==
- Verbascum saccatum K.Koch
- Verbascum × sakaryense Hub.-Mor.
- Verbascum salgirensis Soldano
- Verbascum × salmoneum Troickij
- Verbascum salviifolium Boiss.
- Verbascum × samium Rech.f.
- Verbascum samniticum Ten.
- Verbascum × sarikamischense Hub.-Mor.
- Verbascum scabridum (Skan) Hub.-Mor.
- Verbascum scamandri Murb.
- Verbascum scaposum Boiss.
- Verbascum schachdagense P.P.Gritz.
- Verbascum × schaklavense Bornm. ex Murb.
- Verbascum schimperianum Boiss.
- Verbascum × schottianum Schrad.
- Verbascum scoparium Mozaff.
- Verbascum sedgwickianum (G.W.Schimp. ex Engl.) Hub.-Mor.
- Verbascum × selimense Hub.-Mor.
- Verbascum × semialbum Chaub.
- Verbascum × semilanatum Borbás
- Verbascum × semirigidum Hausskn.
- Verbascum × semisplendidum Rech.f.
- Verbascum × semiundulatum Rech.f.
- Verbascum × semivulcanicum Hub.-Mor.
- Verbascum serpenticola (Hub.-Mor.) Hub.-Mor.
- Verbascum serratifolium (Hub.-Mor.) Hub.-Mor.
- Verbascum sessiliflorum Murb.
- Verbascum × sevanense Hub.-Mor.
- Verbascum seydisehirense Tugay & Ulukus
- Verbascum shahsavarensis Sotoodeh, Attar & Civeyrel
- Verbascum sheilae Hemaid
- Verbascum shiqricum Hemaid
- Verbascum × siatistense Hub.-Mor. & Rech.f.
- Verbascum × sibyllinum Sutorý
- Verbascum siculum Tod. ex Lojac.
- Verbascum × silifkense Hub.-Mor.
- Verbascum × silvanense Hub.-Mor.
- Verbascum simavicum Hub.-Mor.
- Verbascum × simonianum Hub.-Mor.
- Verbascum simplex Hoffmanns. & Link
- Verbascum sinaiticum Benth.
- Verbascum × sinuatifolium Hub.-Mor.
- Verbascum sinuatum L.
- Verbascum × sivasicum Hub.-Mor.
- Verbascum × skamneliense Hub.-Mor. & Rech.f.
- Verbascum smyrnaeum Boiss.
- Verbascum songaricum Schrenk
- Verbascum sorgerae (Hub.-Mor.) Hub.-Mor.
- Verbascum spathulisepalum Greuter & Rech.f.
- Verbascum × speciosiforme Hub.-Mor.
- Verbascum speciosum Schrad.
- Verbascum sphenandroides K.Koch
- Verbascum spinosum L.
- Verbascum splendidum Boiss.
- Verbascum spodiotrichum (Hub.-Mor.) Hub.-Mor.
- Verbascum stachydifolium Boiss. & Heldr.
- Verbascum stachydiforme Boiss. & Buhse
- Verbascum stelurum Murb.
- Verbascum × steniense Rech.f.
- Verbascum stenocarpum Boiss. & Heldr.
- Verbascum stenostachyum Hub.-Mor.
- Verbascum stepporum Hub.-Mor.
- Verbascum × sterile Hausskn.
- Verbascum straussii (Bornm.) Hub.-Mor.
- Verbascum × stribrny Murb. ex Sutorý
- Verbascum strictum E.D.Clarke
- Verbascum × subantinori Hub.-Mor.
- Verbascum × subcaudatum Hub.-Mor.
- Verbascum × subcheiranthifolium Hub.-Mor.
- Verbascum × subcymosum Hub.-Mor.
- Verbascum × suberiocarpum Hub.-Mor.
- Verbascum × sublasianthum Hub.-Mor.
- Verbascum sublobatum Murb.
- Verbascum × submesopotamicum Hub.-Mor.
- Verbascum subnivale Boiss. & Hausskn.
- Verbascum × subphlomoides Hausskn.
- Verbascum subserratum Hub.-Mor.
- Verbascum × subsplendidum Rech.f.
- Verbascum × subvacillans Rech.f.
- Verbascum sudanicum (Murb.) Hepper
- Verbascum × sultanense Bornm. ex Murb.
- Verbascum suworowianum (K.Koch) Kuntze
- Verbascum symes Murb. & Rech.f.
- Verbascum syriacum Schrad.
- Verbascum szovitsianum Boiss.

== T ==
- Verbascum tabukum Hemaid
- Verbascum × tamderense Hub.-Mor.
- Verbascum tauri Boiss. & Kotschy
- Verbascum × tauricum Hook.
- Verbascum × tekirovense Hub.-Mor.
- Verbascum tenue Murb.
- Verbascum tenuicaule (Murb.) Hub.-Mor.
- Verbascum × terdschanense Hub.-Mor.
- Verbascum tetrandrum Barratte & Murb.
- Verbascum × thapsi L.
- Verbascum thapsus L.
- Verbascum × thessalum Hausskn.
- Verbascum tiberiadis Boiss.
- Verbascum tibesticum (Quézel) Hub.-Mor.
- Verbascum × tomentosulum Freyn
- Verbascum × torculifragum Murb.
- Verbascum tossiense Freyn & Sint.
- Verbascum transcaucasicum E.Wulff
- Verbascum transjordanicum Murb.
- Verbascum transolympicum Hub.-Mor.
- Verbascum trapifolium (Stapf) Hub.-Mor.
- Verbascum trichostylum Hub.-Mor.
- Verbascum tripolitanum Boiss.
- Verbascum tropidocarpum Murb.
- Verbascum × tschamlibelense Hub.-Mor.
- Verbascum × tschilemelekdagense Hub.-Mor.
- Verbascum × tschivrilense Hub.-Mor.
- Verbascum tuna-ekimii Karavel., A.Duran & Hamzaoglu
- Verbascum × tundscheliense Hub.-Mor.
- Verbascum turcicum Bani, Adigüzel & Karavel.
- Verbascum turcomanicum Murb.
- Verbascum turkestanicum Franch.
- Verbascum tzar-borisii (Davidov ex Stoj.) Stef.-Gat.

== U ==
- Verbascum undulatum Lam.
- Verbascum urceolatum Hub.-Mor.
- Verbascum urobracteum Hub.-Mor.
- Verbascum urumoffii Stoj. & Acht.
- Verbascum uschakense (Murb.) Hub.-Mor.
- Verbascum × ustulatum Celak.

== V ==
- Verbascum vacillans Murb.
- Verbascum × vajdae Boros
- Verbascum vandasii (Rohlena) Rohlena
- Verbascum vanense Hub.-Mor.
- Verbascum × varciorovae Nyár.
- Verbascum varians Freyn & Sint.
- Verbascum × versiflorum Schrad.
- Verbascum × vidavense Simonk.
- Verbascum virgatum Stokes
- Verbascum × vlassianum Hub.-Mor. & Rech.f.
- Verbascum × vodnense Bornm.
- Verbascum vulcanicum Boiss. & Heldr.
- Verbascum × vuyckii Kloos

== W ==
- Verbascum wiedemannianum Fisch. & C.A.Mey.
- Verbascum wilhelmsianum K.Koch
- Verbascum wraberi Micevski & Matevski

== X ==
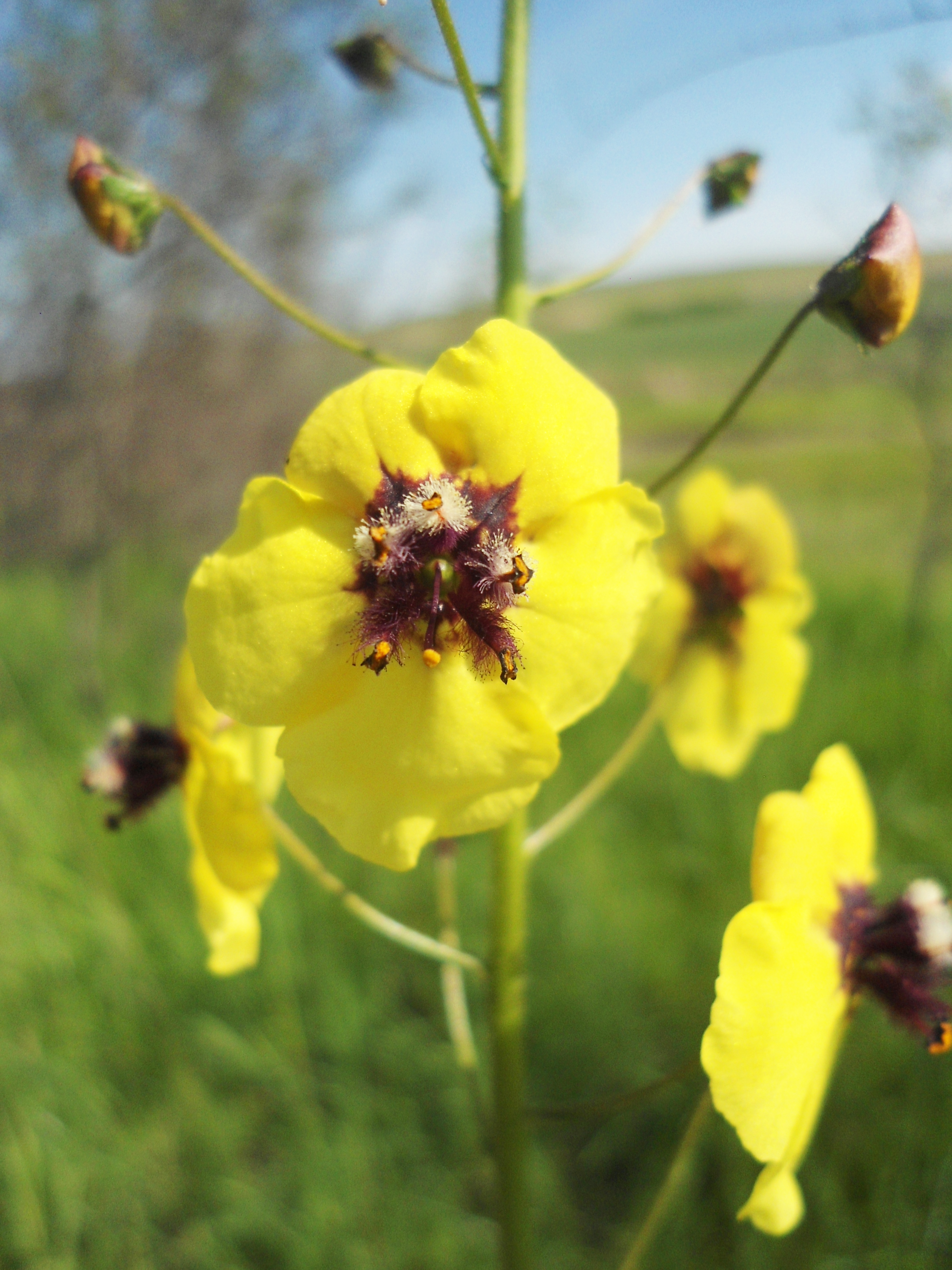
V. xanthophoeniceum

- Verbascum xanthophoeniceum Griseb.

== Y ==
- Verbascum yemense Deflers
- Verbascum yurtkuranianum Kaynak, Daskin & Yilmaz

== Z ==
- Verbascum zaianense (Murb.) Hub.-Mor.
- Verbascum × zlataroffii Davidov
