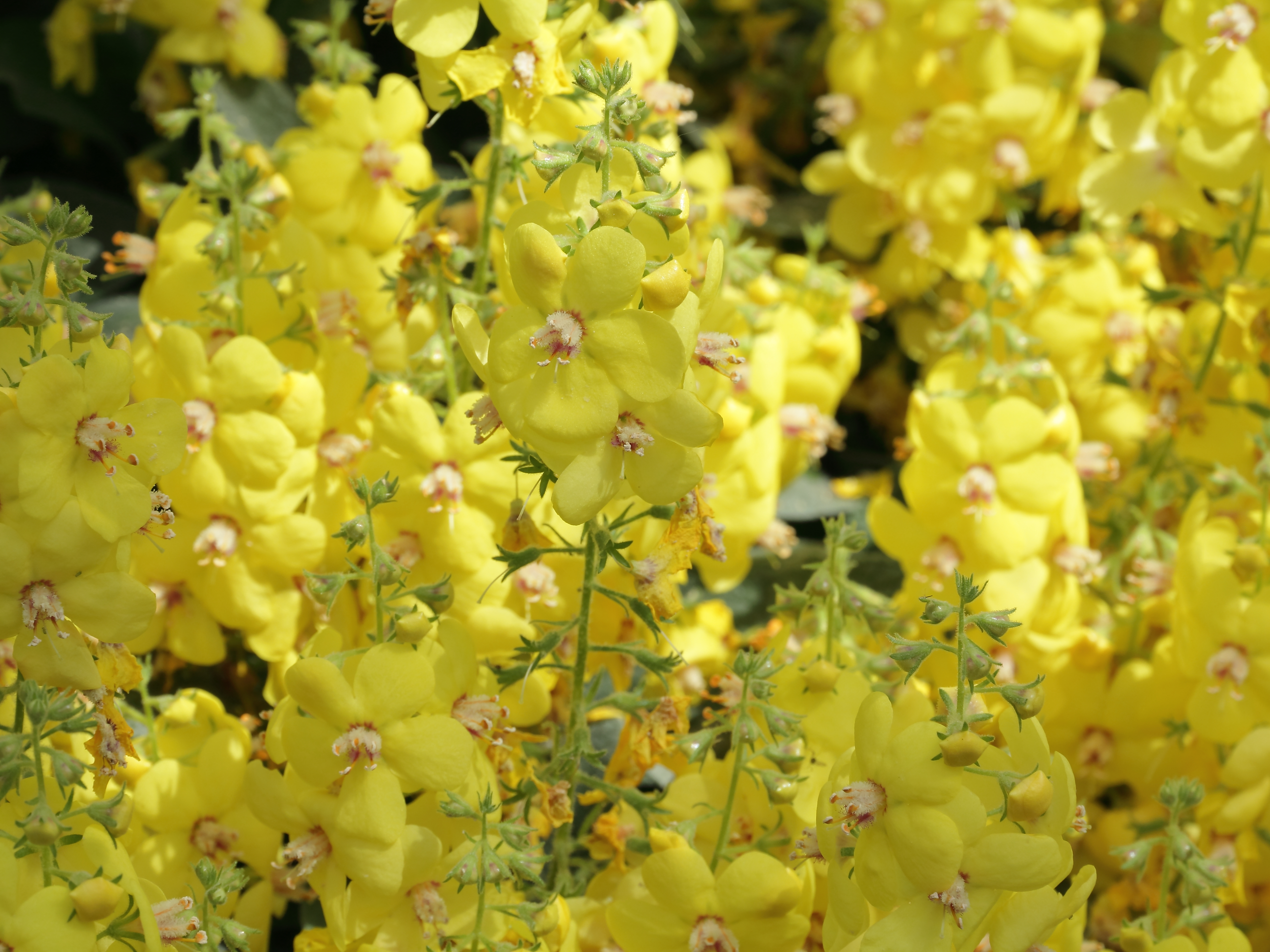
- Gothenburg Botanical Garden

Scientific classification
- Kingdom: Plantae
- Clade: Tracheophytes
- Clade: Angiosperms
- Clade: Eudicots
- Clade: Asterids
- Order: Lamiales
- Family: Scrophulariaceae
- Genus: Verbascum
- Species: V. dumulosum

Binomial name
- Verbascum dumulosum P.H.Davis & Hub.-Mor.

= Verbascum dumulosum =

Species of shrub

Verbascum dumulosum, the shrubby mullein, is a species of flowering plant in the family Scrophulariaceae, native to south west Turkey. Growing to 25 cm (10 in) tall by 40 cm (16 in) wide, it is an evergreen subshrub with sage-like, felted grey-green leaves and masses of saucer-shaped yellow flowers with red eyes in summer. As it requires sharp drainage, it is often planted in full sun in a gravel bed or in rock crevices.

The specific epithet dumulosum means "bushy".

It has gained the Royal Horticultural Society's Award of Garden Merit.
