= Verbascum capitis-viridis =

Conservation status
- Vulnerable (IUCN 3.1)

Scientific classification
- Kingdom: Plantae
- Clade: Tracheophytes
- Clade: Angiosperms
- Clade: Eudicots
- Clade: Asterids
- Order: Lamiales
- Family: Scrophulariaceae
- Genus: Verbascum
- Species: V. capitis-viridis

Binomial name
- Verbascum capitis-viridis Hub.-Mor., 1973

Synonyms
- Celsia insularis Murb.

Species of flowering plant

Verbascum capitis-viridis is a species of flowers that belongs to the family Scrophulariaceae. The species is endemic to Cape Verde. The species was first named Celsia insularis by Murbeck, but Arthur Huber-Morath placed it in the Verbascum species in 1973. Its local name is sabão de feticeira.

Verbascum capitis-viridis is only found on the islands of Santo Antão, São Nicolau and Santiago. It is considered extinct on the islands of São Vicente, Boa Vista and Maio.
