= Verbascum fruticulosum =

Scientific classification
- Kingdom: Plantae
- Clade: Tracheophytes
- Clade: Angiosperms
- Clade: Eudicots
- Clade: Asterids
- Order: Lamiales
- Family: Scrophulariaceae
- Genus: Verbascum
- Species: V. fruticulosum

Binomial name
- Verbascum fruticulosum Post

Species of mullein

Verbascum fruticulosum is a species of mullein native to Israel, northwestern Jordan and southwestern Syria.

== Description ==
The plant grows as a mass of branches of small, rusty to glaucous, pubescent curled foliage. Verbascum fruticulosum sometimes occupies the area of 1 square meter and reaches the height of 1 meter.

The flowers are vivid yellow petals with bright purple or burgundy-colored inner elements. The flowers are hermaphrodite, and bear homogeneous seed-fruits.

Leaves are arranged alternately, one leaf per node, rosette pattern. The leaves are dentate or serrate, and stipule is absent. The plant manages to keep live foliage year around, flowers March to September. It fruits April to August, and disperses seed August to December.

== Habitat ==
Its habitat is batha (garrigue, phrygana), desert tracks, and hard rock outcrops. The plant is obligate natural, and not synanthropic.

== Ecology ==
The plant is very drought resistant.
