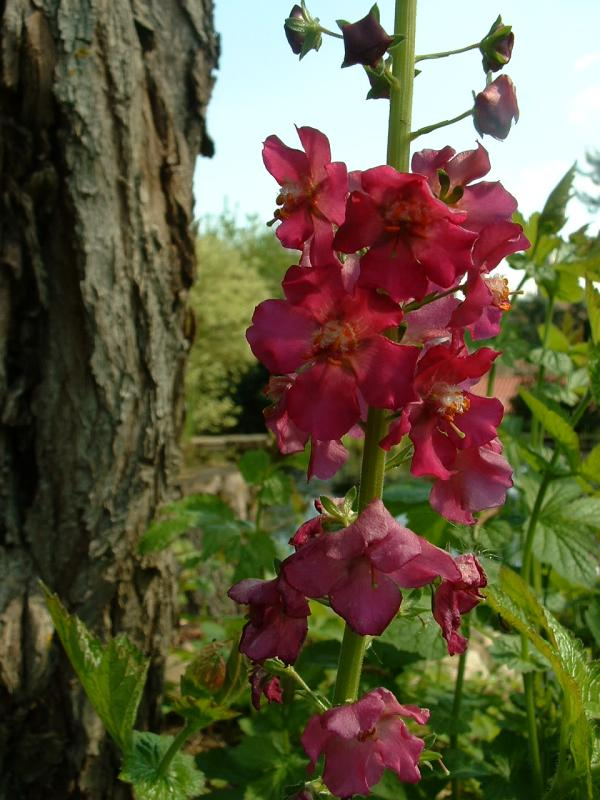

Scientific classification
- Kingdom: Plantae
- Clade: Tracheophytes
- Clade: Angiosperms
- Clade: Eudicots
- Clade: Asterids
- Order: Lamiales
- Family: Scrophulariaceae
- Genus: Verbascum
- Species: V. phoeniceum

Binomial name
- Verbascum phoeniceum L.

= Verbascum phoeniceum =

Species of flowering plant

Verbascum phoeniceum, known as purple mullein, is a species of mullein that is part of the family Scrophulariaceae native to Central Europe, Central Asia and Western China. It is also naturalized in certain regions of the US and Canada. It successfully grows in USDA’s zones 4 to 8. It is a short-lived perennial species, and blooms earlier than other mullein species on average, producing vibrant purple-pink flowers; it can grow up to 1m or more.

== Description ==
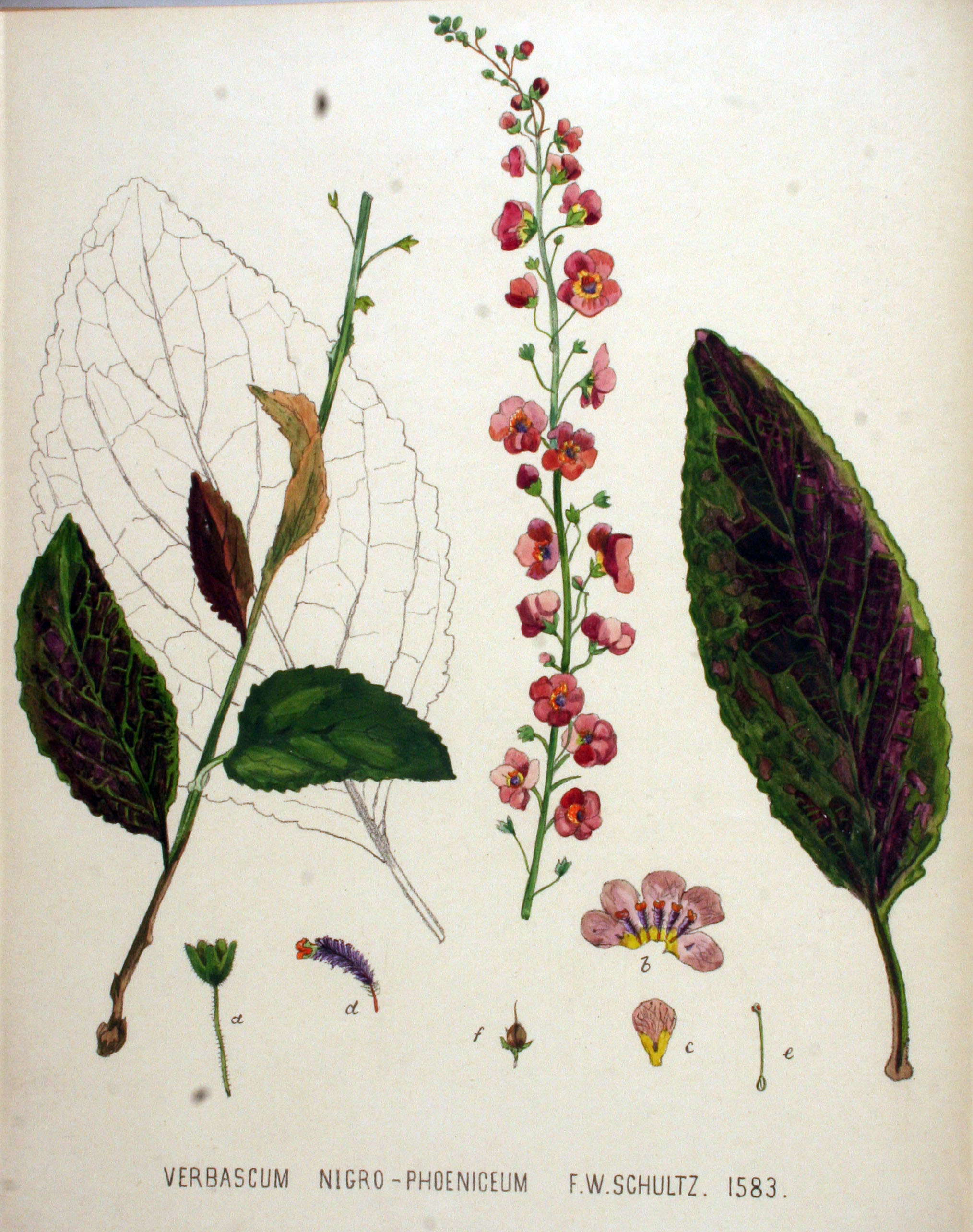
General morphology

Verbascum phoeniceum is a dicot plant that begins with rosette growth in late spring and into summer. The initial lower rosette shows whorled basal leaves with pinnate venation and as growth continues, simple leaves grow in an alternating fashion on the stem. The shape of the leaf blades of the V. phoeniceum can be elliptical, ovate, chordate or lanceolate depending on the environment in which it grows in. Five-petaled flowers appear when in bloom, where it grows as an inflorescence with multiple flowers on a spike starting with the first blooms on the bottom of the spike and newer ones upwards of the spike. V. phoeniceum exhibits pentamerous growth of perianth and corolla that is characteristic of the dicotyledonous mulleins.

The flowers can be deep purple in color (violetta) to pink (rosetta) and white (flush of white). The variation in shades for V. phoeniceum makes it ideal for hybridization with other mulleins. Hybrids may have flower colors ranging from white to various shades of pink and plum; as well as the advantage of a longer growing season due to its perennial nature. In the center of each flower are fuzzy golden-yellow stamens. The height of V. phoeniceum is shorter than most mulleins but can range between 0.9m – 1.2m in an herbaceous habit.

== Subspecies ==
There are two recognized subspecies of Verbascum phoeniceum:

- Verbascum phoeniceum subsp. flavidum (yellow corollas, found in Greece)
- Verbascum phoeniceum subsp. phoeniceum

== Distribution ==
Verbascum phoeniceum is found in southern Europe, northern Africa and central Asia. It thrives in dry soils with full sunlight. Although they can tolerate moderate shade, they are unable to withstand soggy soils thereby requiring efficient water drainage. It can be found growing wild on hillsides, disturbed sites and woodlands in their native habitats. V. phoeniceum has been brought over to the US among other temperate regions and cultivated as an ornamental garden plant. It thrives in USDA’s hardiness zones 4-8, with possible natural occurrence in New York and Ohio where the winter temperatures are also required for seed germination after dormancy.

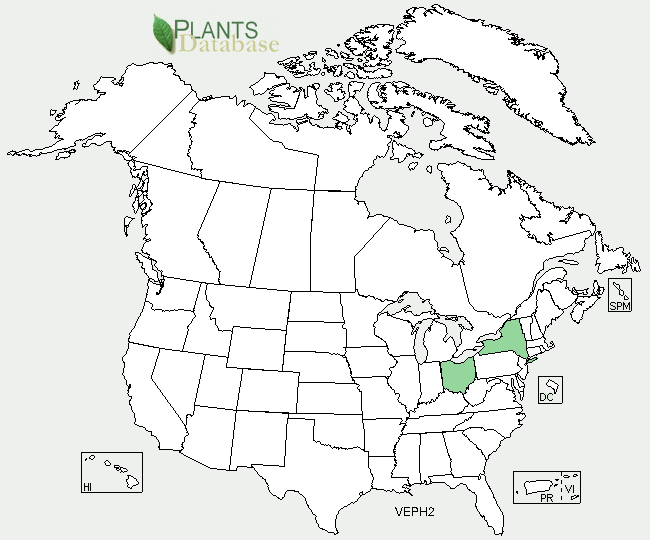
USDA map of V. phoeniceum zones.

== Ecology ==
Verbascum phoeniceum is pollinated by hoverflies and bees although it is suspected that moths also take part in pollinating the mulleins. The flowers expel a fragrance early in the day believed to attract moths and close up midday.

In a study by Branimir Petkovic et al. 2004, V. phoeniceum were planted on three different substratum soil types, serpentine, andesite and limestone. Results showed that plant morphology and anatomy varies with soil type. Plants grown on serpentine substratum produced smaller stem leaves with the blades chordate shaped and dentate margins; plants grown on limestone substratum featured lanceolate stem leaves with entire margins and plants grown on andesite substratum featured even narrower chordate stem leaves with dentate margins. Serpentine soil produces an overall decrease in average values of the V. phoeniceum while limestone yields the highest values with andesite an intermediate, these values includes plant height, inflorescent length, flower numbers, and pedicel length.

The first observation of self-incompatibility in plants was made on V. phoeniceum in the late 18th century and published by Joseph Gottlieb Kölreuter. Unlike other mulleins V. thapsus and V. lychnitis which are able to self-pollinate, V. phoeniceum pollinated with their own pollen do not set seed but are cross-fertile; this had been attributed to the allotetraploidy of the plant. Despite perfect flowers, individual V. phoeniceum flowers are shown to display either extreme male or extreme female characteristics, yielding more successful pollinations when used as such. V. phoeniceum has 2n= 32, 36 chromosomes.

Verbascum phoeniceum plants will self-seed, dropping their seed pods freely where the plants occur to join the soil seed bank. Horticulturalists growing V. phoeniceum often deadhead flowers to keep the plant in continuous bloom throughout its short-perennial lifespan.

== Cultivation ==
Verbascum phoeniceum is cultivated as an ornamental plant, useful for adding vertical accents to the garden. It prefers alkaline or poor soil in a sunny position.

Several cultivars have been developed in a range of shades, including:

- 'Cotswold Queen' (yellow with maroon eye)
- 'Flush of White' (white with yellow centre)
- 'Gainsborough' (pale yellow)
- 'Rosetta' (pink)
- 'Temptress Purple' (purple)
- 'Violetta' (purple)

== Usage ==
Other than horticultural, there are not as many known uses for Verbascum phoeniceum compared to other mulleins. However in a study by Tatli et al. 2006, the methanolic extracts taken from the leaves and flowers of V. phoeniceum and other verbascum plants showed strong antimicrobial activity.
