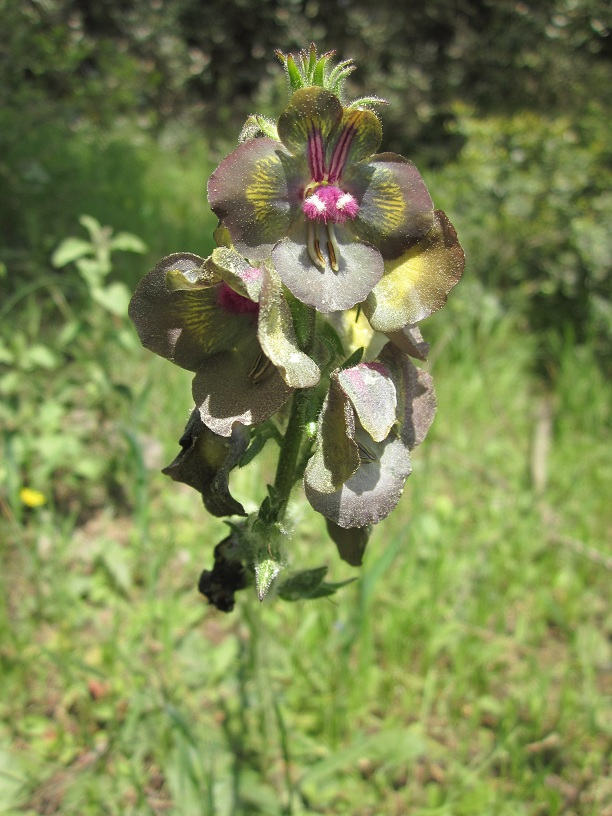

Scientific classification
- Kingdom: Plantae
- Clade: Tracheophytes
- Clade: Angiosperms
- Clade: Eudicots
- Clade: Asterids
- Order: Lamiales
- Family: Scrophulariaceae
- Genus: Verbascum
- Species: V. bugulifolium

Binomial name
- Verbascum bugulifolium Lam.

Synonyms
- Celsia bugulifolia (Lam.) Jaub. & Spach; Janthe bugulifolia (Lam.) Griseb.; Verbascum bugulaefolium Lam.

= Verbascum bugulifolium =

Species of flowering plant

Verbascum bugulifolium is a species of Verbascum native to Bulgaria and western Turkey.

== Description ==
Verbascum bugulifolium grows to 15–75 cm (5.9–29.5 in) tall, with a basal rosette of ovate leaves 25–80 mm (0.98–3.15 in) long and 10–30 mm (0.39–1.18 in) wide. The round or slightly angled stem also bears a few much smaller leaves. The inflorescence is a simple raceme, with each flower attached to the main stem by a short pedicel. The corolla is 20–35 mm (0.79–1.38 in) in diameter, and is "yellowish to bluish green" in colour, with purplish lines.
