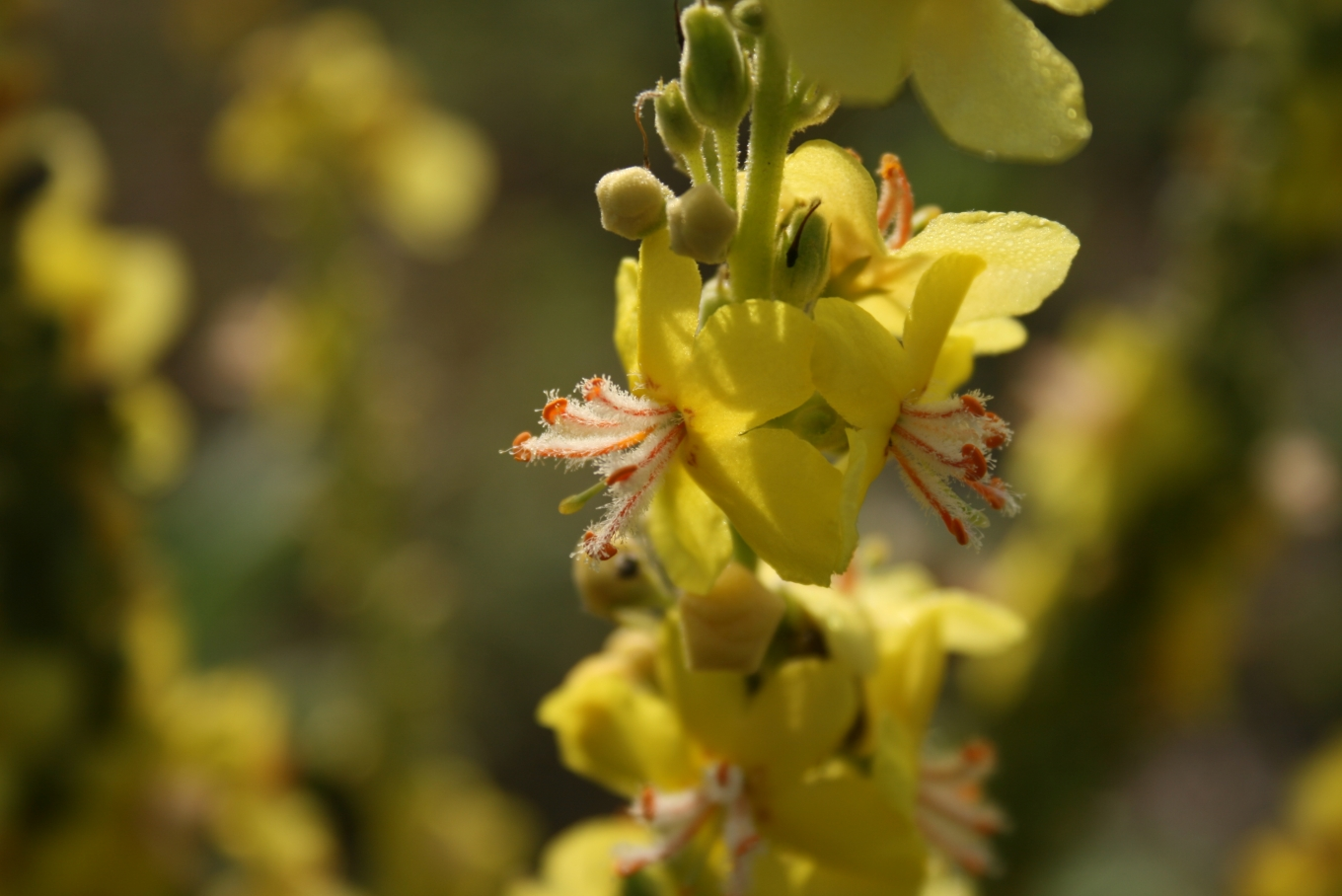

Scientific classification
- Kingdom: Plantae
- Clade: Tracheophytes
- Clade: Angiosperms
- Clade: Eudicots
- Clade: Asterids
- Order: Lamiales
- Family: Scrophulariaceae
- Genus: Verbascum
- Species: V. speciosum

Binomial name
- Verbascum speciosum Schrad.

= Verbascum speciosum =

Species of flowering plant

Verbascum speciosum is a species of flowering plant in the figwort family known by the common name Hungarian mullein or showy mullein. It is native to eastern Europe and western Asia, and it is known in many other regions as an introduced species and roadside weed. It is a biennial herb forming a rosette of large leaves and an erect stem well exceeding one meter in maximum height. The leaves are 30 to 40 centimeters long and have smooth edges and pointed tips. The plant blooms in a large panicle with many branches lined with flowers. Each flower has a corolla measuring 2 to 3 centimeters wide with five yellow petals. There are five stamens coated in long white hairs at the center. The fruit is a capsule up to 7 millimeters in length containing many seeds.
