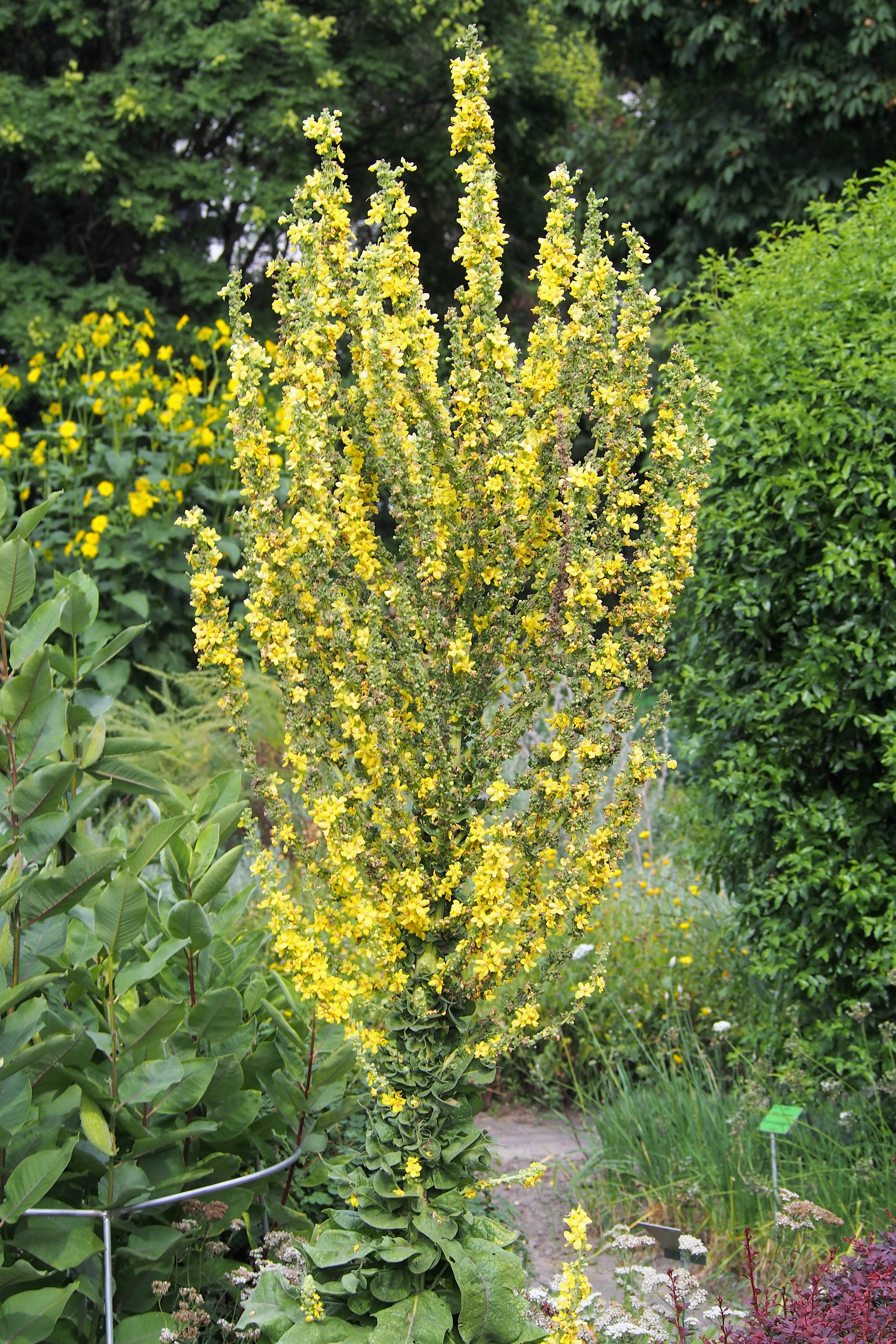
- At the University of Wrocław Botanical Garden
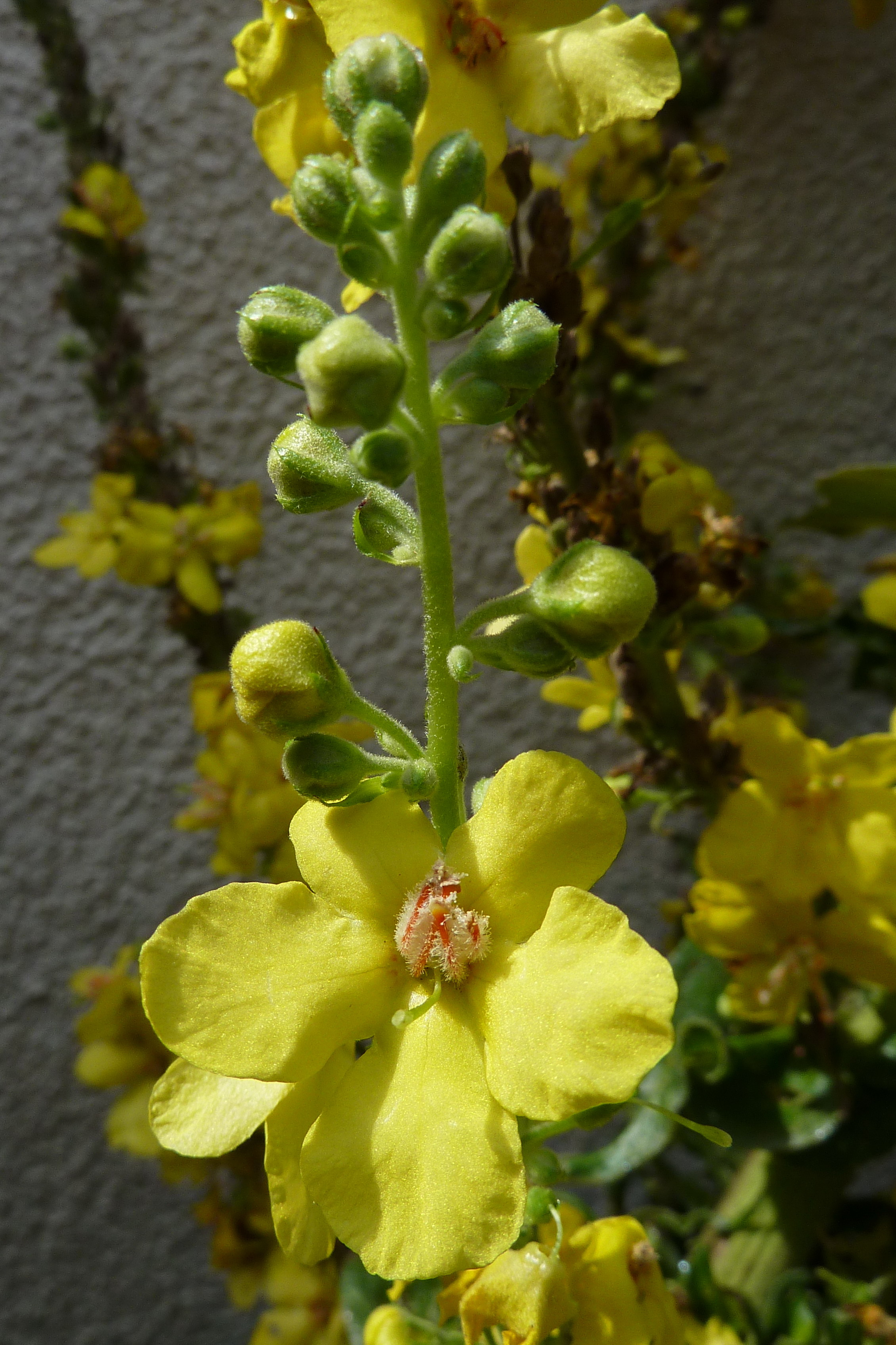
- Flower spike

Scientific classification
- Kingdom: Plantae
- Clade: Embryophytes
- Clade: Tracheophytes
- Clade: Angiosperms
- Clade: Eudicots
- Clade: Asterids
- Order: Lamiales
- Family: Scrophulariaceae
- Genus: Verbascum
- Species: V. olympicum

Binomial name
- Verbascum olympicum Boiss.

= Verbascum olympicum =

Species of flowering plant

Verbascum olympicum, the Greek mullein, Olympian mullein or Olympic mullein, is a species of flowering plant in the family Scrophulariaceae, native to northwest Turkey. A short-lived perennial reaching 2 m (6 ft 7 in), the Royal Horticultural Society considers it a good plant to attract pollinators.
