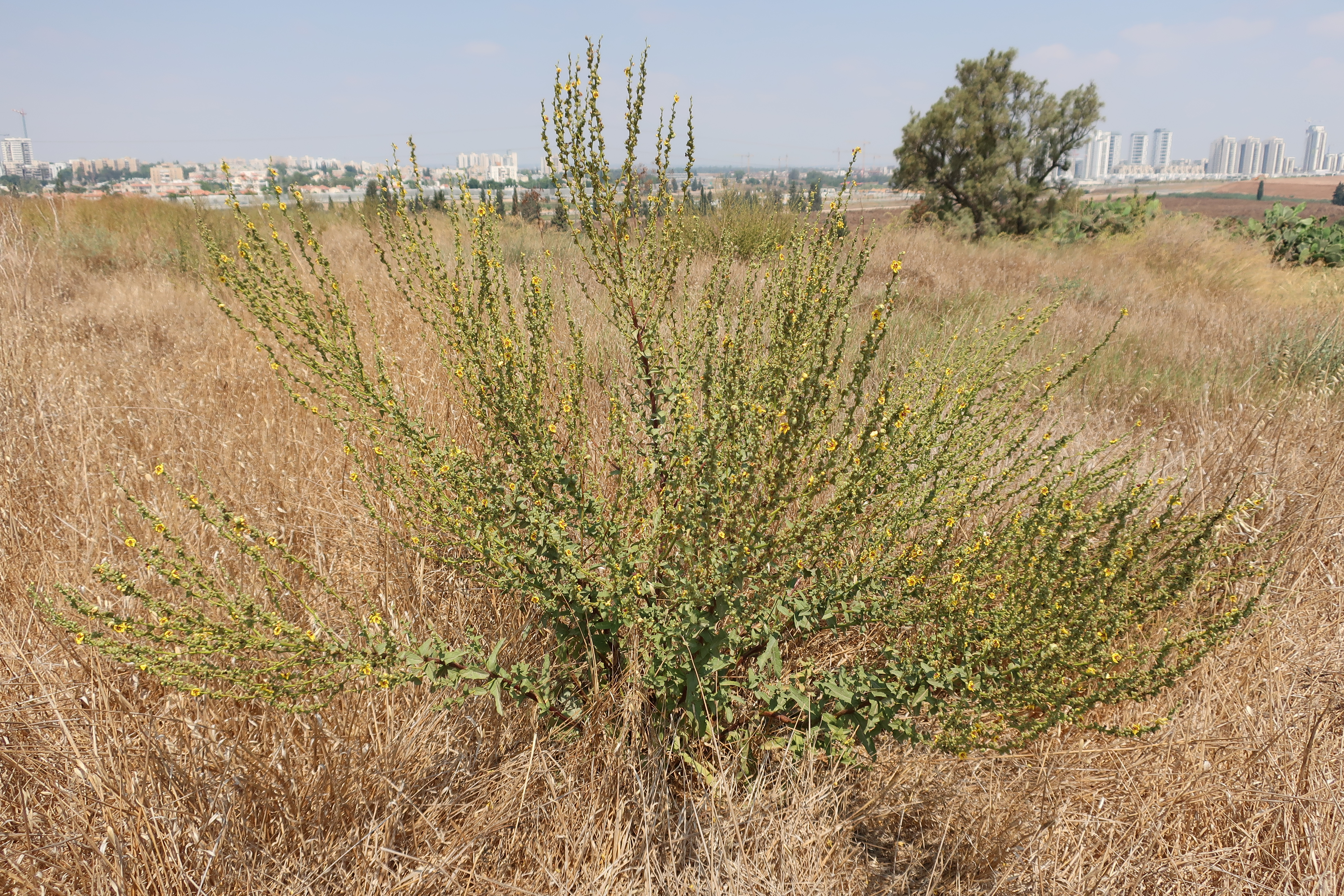

Scientific classification
- Kingdom: Plantae
- Clade: Tracheophytes
- Clade: Angiosperms
- Clade: Eudicots
- Clade: Asterids
- Order: Lamiales
- Family: Scrophulariaceae
- Genus: Verbascum
- Species: V. sinuatum

Binomial name
- Verbascum sinuatum L.

Synonyms
- Celsia sinuata (L.) Colla; Lychnitis sinuata (L.) Fourr.; Thapsus sinuatum (L.) Raf.

= Verbascum sinuatum =

Species of plant

Verbascum sinuatum, commonly known as the scallop-leaved mullein, the wavyleaf mullein, or Candela regia, is a species of perennial herbaceous plants in the genus Verbascum (mullein), growing in heavy soils in Central Asia and the Mediterranean region. It grows to 1.2–1.5 m (3.9–4.9 ft). The plant has an erect inflorescence stem, and is entirely covered with stellate hairs (trichomes) which are not pleasant to the touch.

== Description ==
In the winter, a rosette of broad-leaves grows at the base of the Scallop-leaved mullein and spreads itself on the ground (length 30–50 cm). In the spring, a leafless stalk grows from the base of the plant, splitting into many diagonal stems that can grow as much as 50 to 100 cm. in length, on which the flowers are located. The plant bears simple, emarginate leaves, and has a yellow lamp-shaped flower (hence its name Candela) of 5 petals, blossoming mostly in late May to August, although sometimes as late as October.

The plant's leaves are alternate, rosette, entire, dentate or serrate.

== Distribution and habitat ==
The plant has a broad Irano-Turanian distribution, as well as a broad Mediterranean distribution (stretching from the Mediterranean coastal regions to West and South Iran). The plant is native to Israel, where it grows in the Golan, the Hermon, the coastline of the Mediterranean Sea, Gilboa, Carmel, Samarian Mountains, Judean Mountains, the Jordan Valley, the Sharon valley, Shephelah, Northern Negev, and Eilat Mountains, and the Arabah, typically found in waste habitats, along waysides, and in open chaparrals (shrublands) and phrygana.

== Properties ==
The scallop-leaved mullein does not produce nectar, but it produces pollen, which attracts bees that collect the pollen. One of the plant's unique features is that when the flower of the plant is merely touched or damaged (such as when one tries tearing one of its petals, or cutting out the stamens) it reacts abruptly by shedding the complete corolla. However, the response is not instantaneous, but "calculated": at first, nothing happens, as if the plant is "thinking" and considering its response; After 30 seconds, the corolla suddenly drops-off. The corolla is short-lived, usually no more than a day. The mechanism is triggered by a sudden shrinking of the calyx, but how the command is transferred from the sensors in the petals of the flower to its activation of the calyx has yet to be determined.

=== Medicinal and other uses ===
In some societies, the flower of certain species of mullein have been used to flavor alcoholic beverages. Other medicinal uses of the flower include a remedy for sore throat and cough, although its efficacy has yet to be scientifically proven. The leaves of certain species of mullein are applied to the skin for wounds, burns, and frostbite. The leaves are used topically to soften and protect the skin.

== Gallery ==
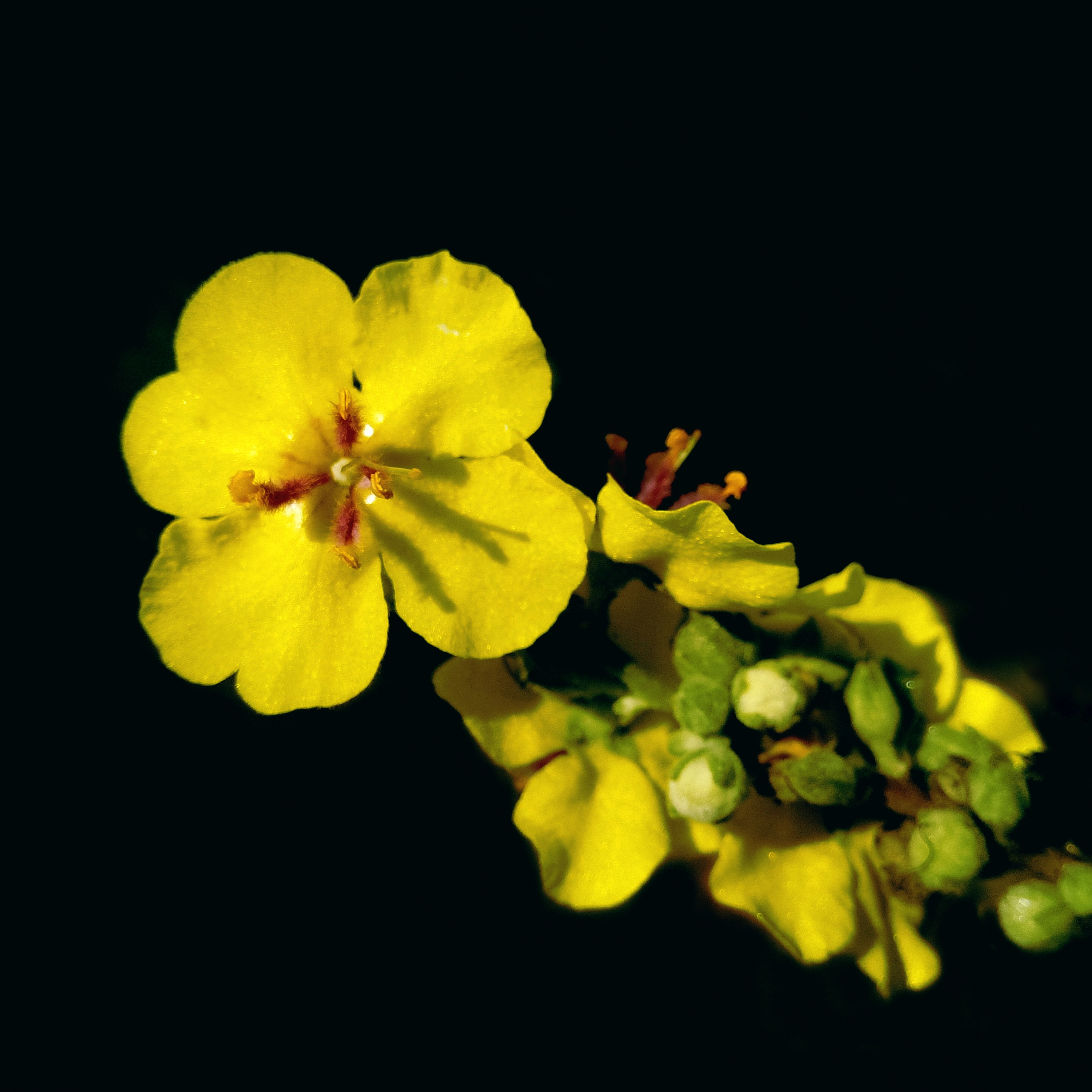
The scallop-leaved mullein flowers

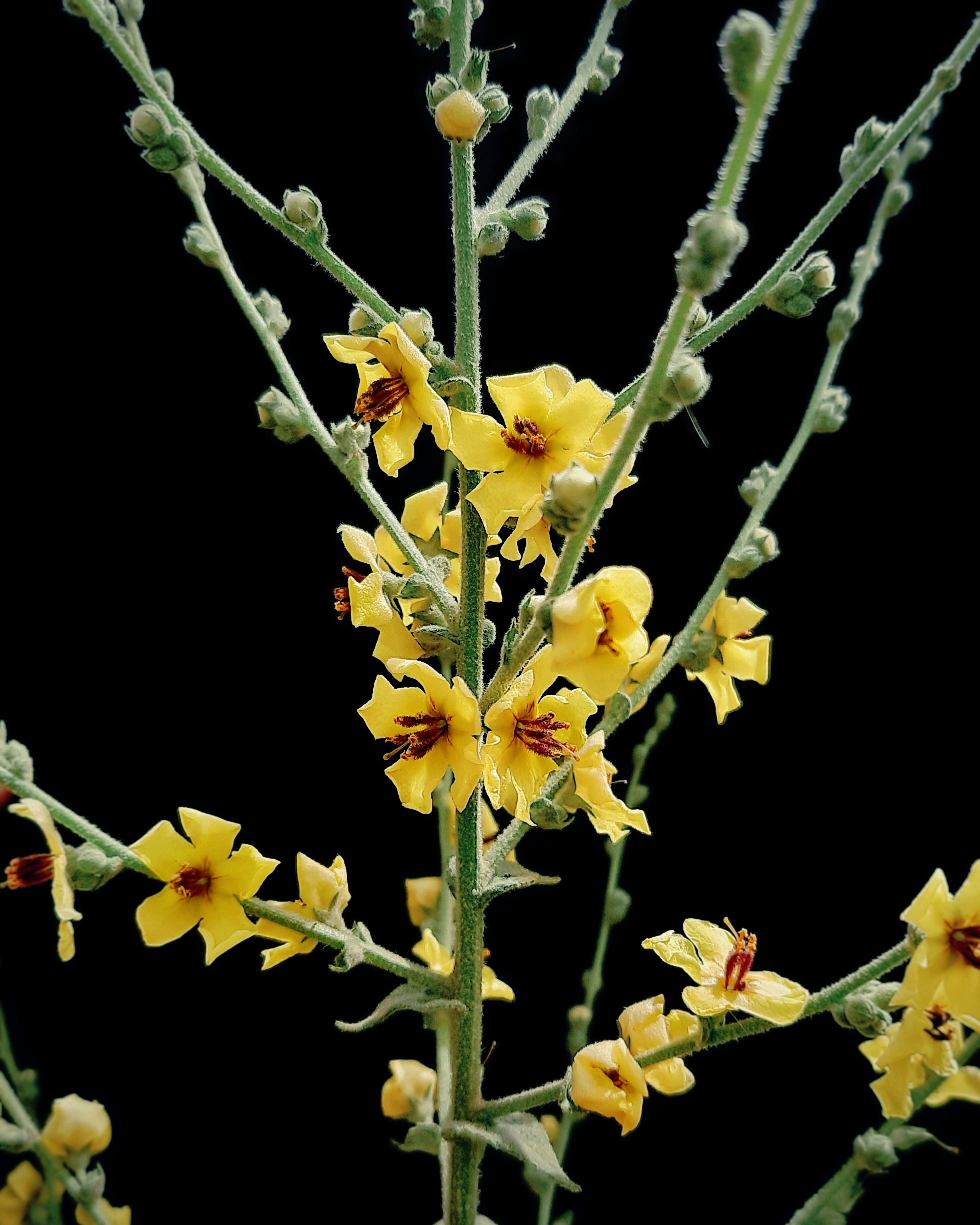
Verbascum sinuatum inflorescence

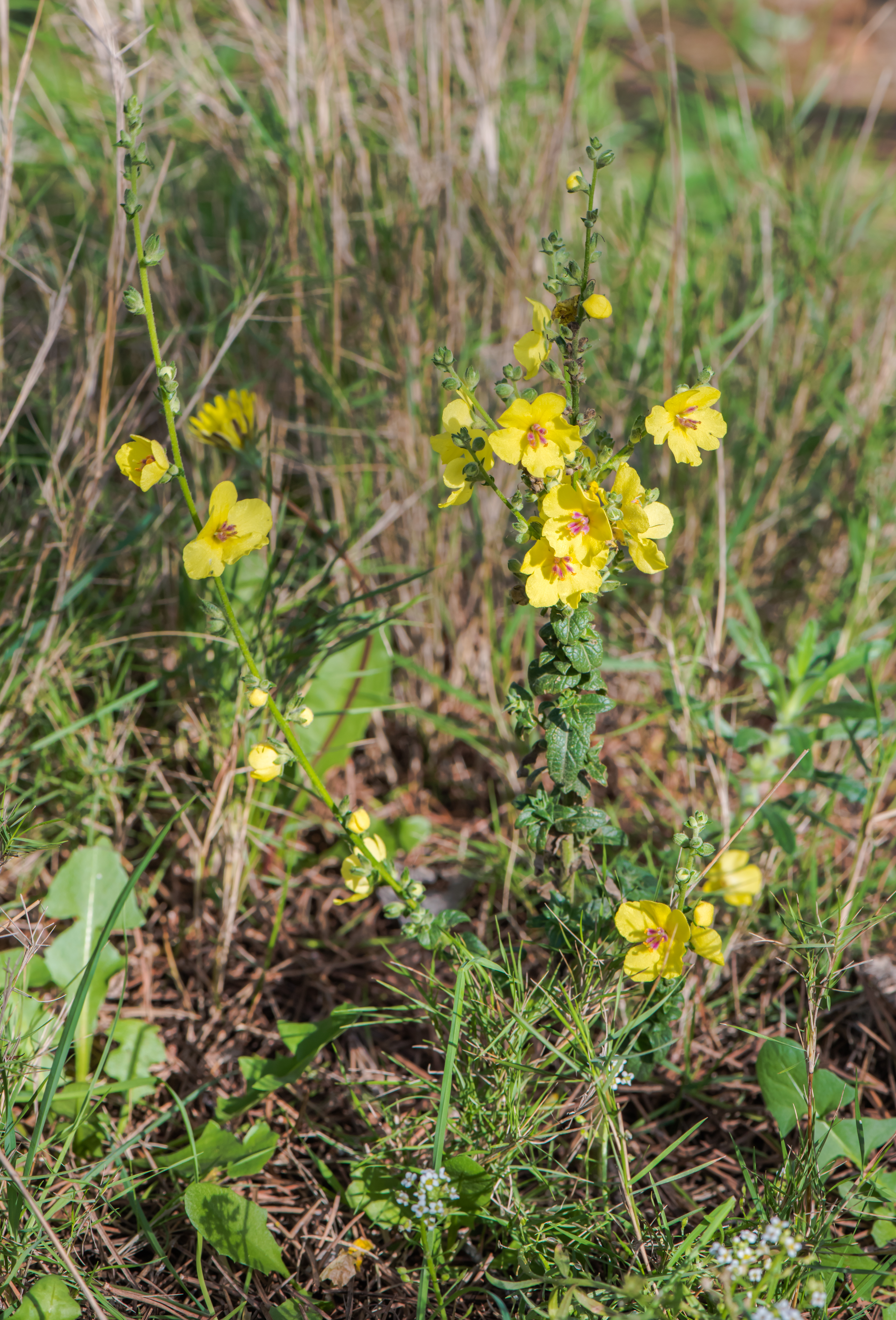

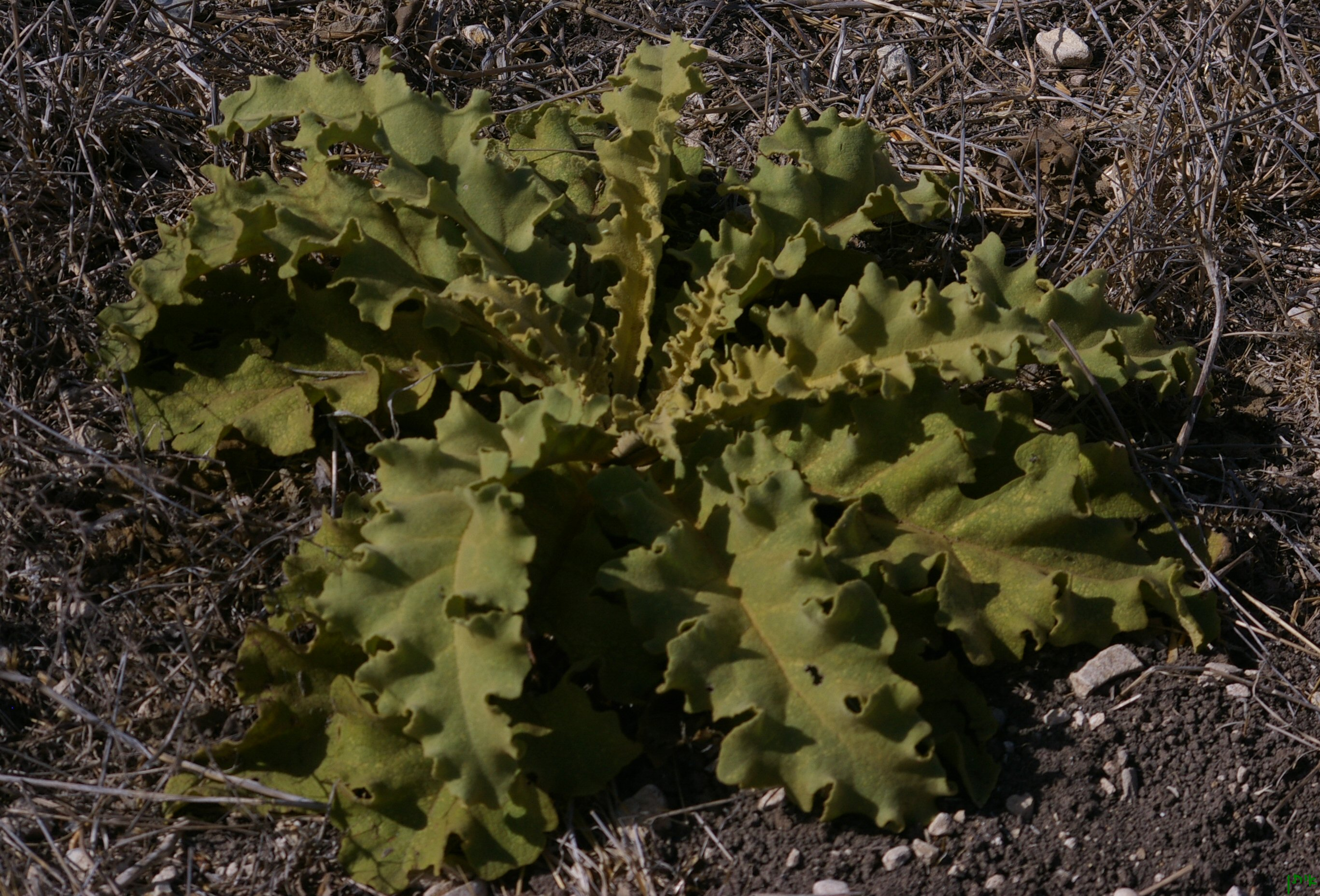
Verbascum sinuatum leaves

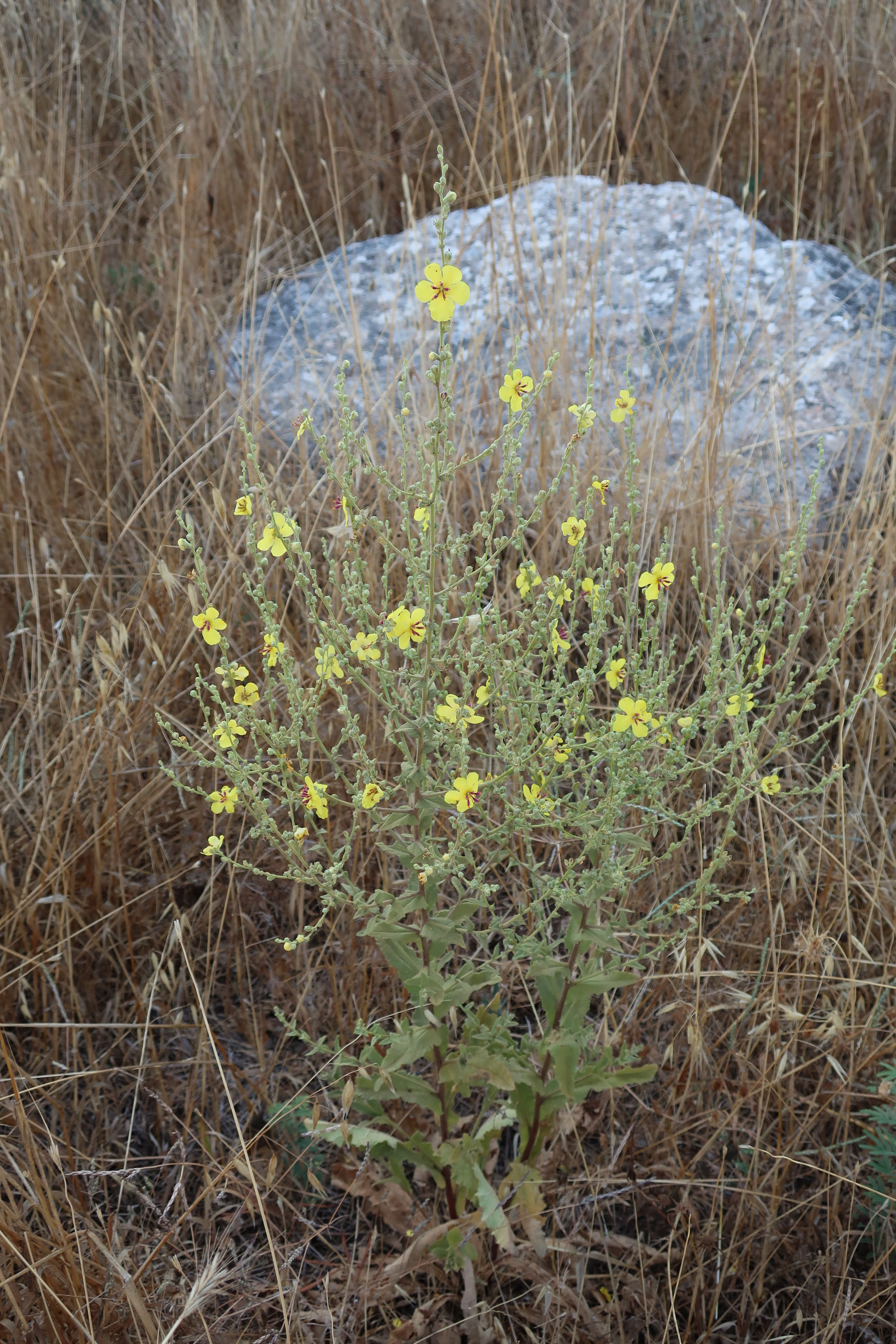
Verbascum sinuatum in Israel

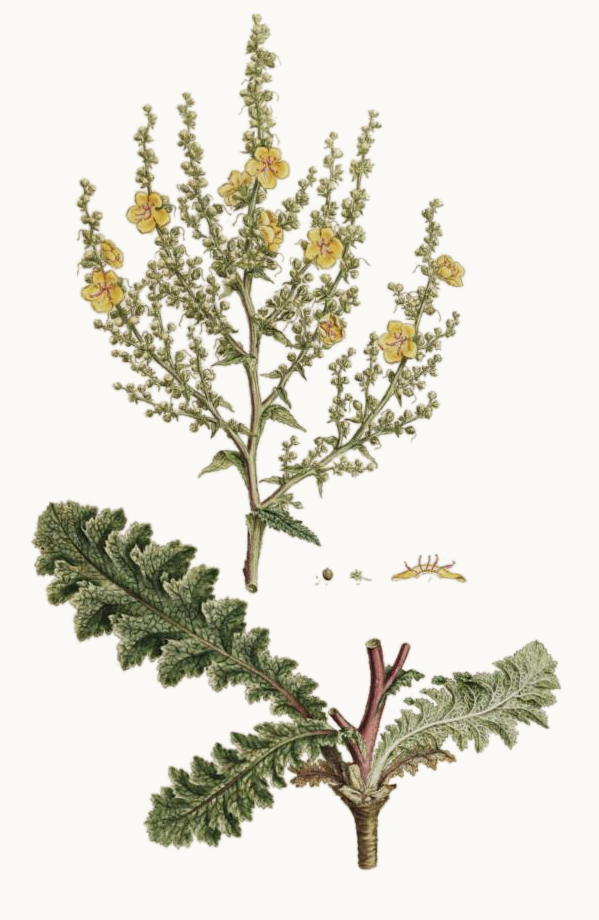
Verbascum sinuatum illustration

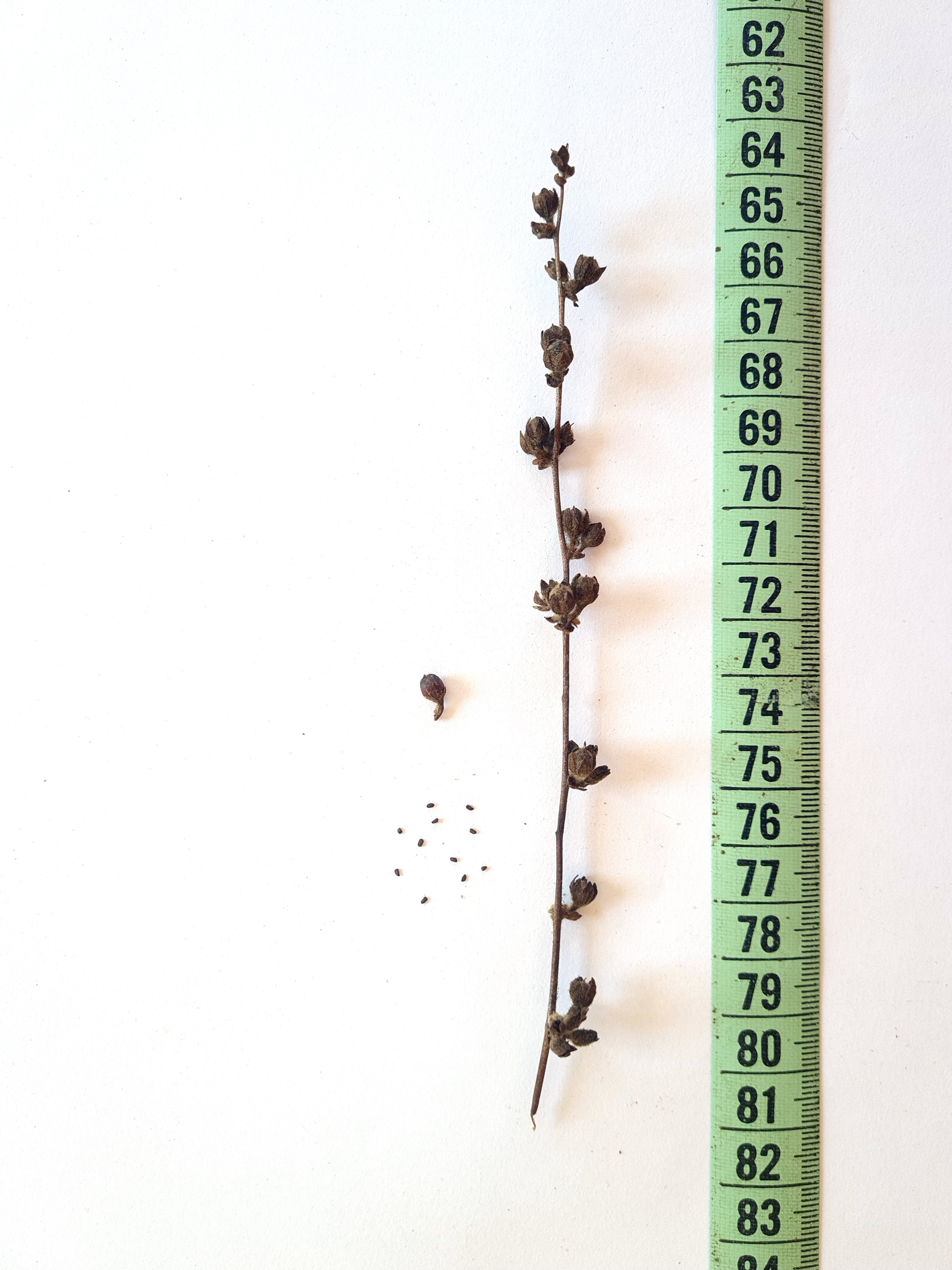
Fruits and seeds of Verbascum sinuatum
