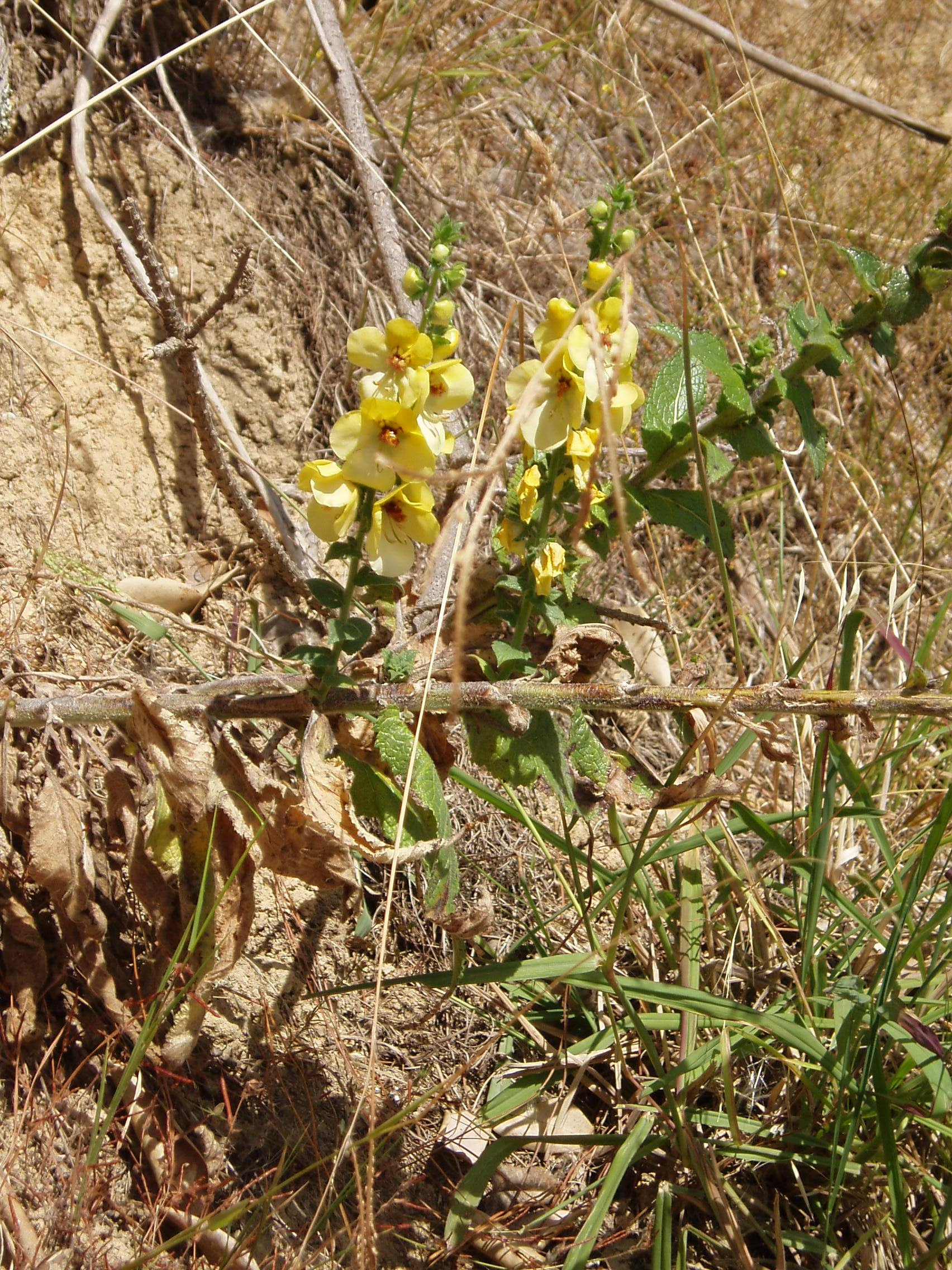

Scientific classification
- Kingdom: Plantae
- Clade: Tracheophytes
- Clade: Angiosperms
- Clade: Eudicots
- Clade: Asterids
- Order: Lamiales
- Family: Scrophulariaceae
- Genus: Verbascum
- Species: V. creticum

Binomial name
- Verbascum creticum (L.) Cav.

Synonyms
- Celsia cretica

= Verbascum creticum =

Species of plant

Verbascum creticum is a species of plant in the family Scrophulariaceae.

== Sources ==
This article incorporates text from a free content work. Licensed under CC0 (license statement/permission). Text taken from Verbascum creticum. Encyclopedia of Life.
