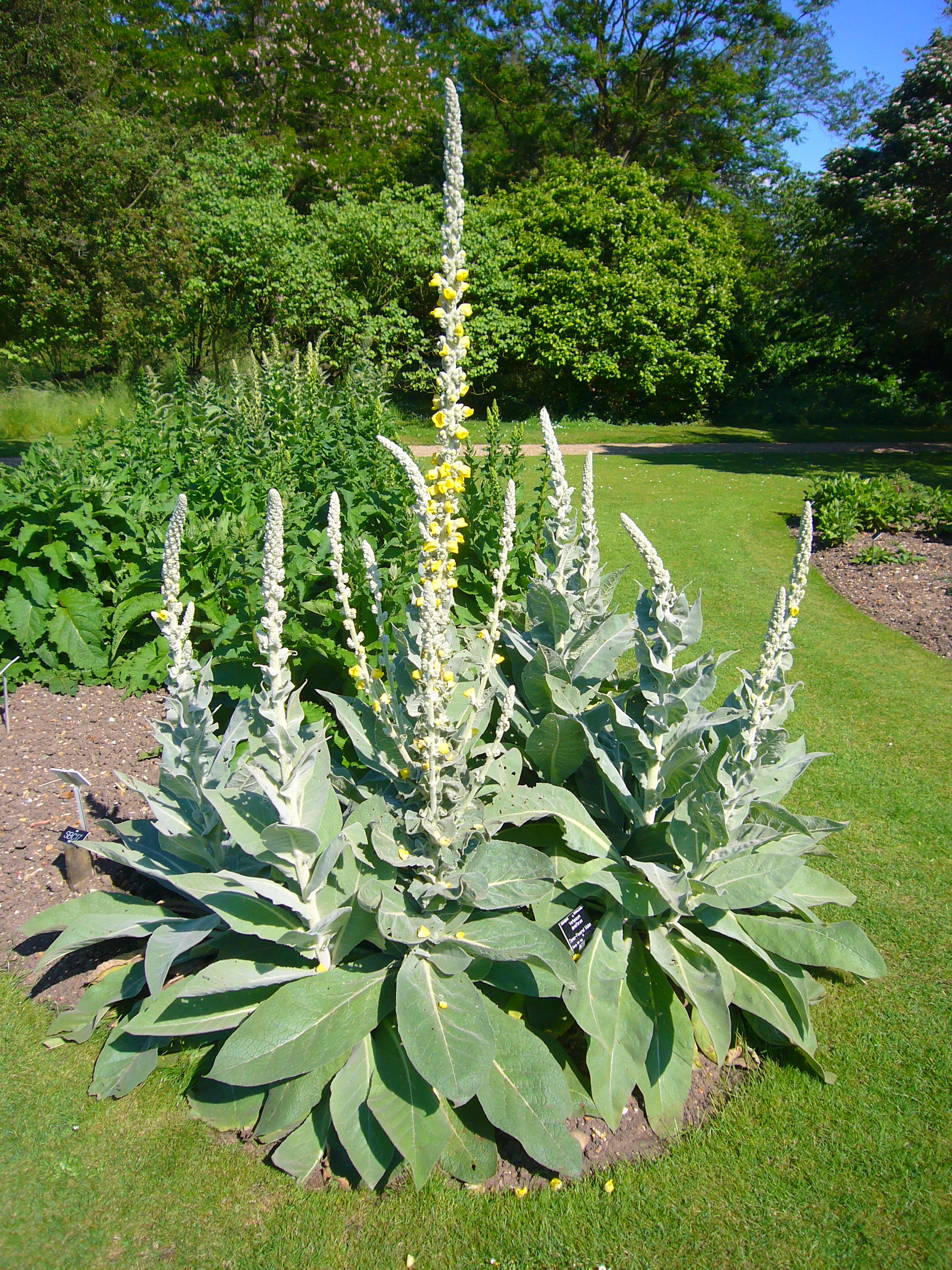

Scientific classification
- Kingdom: Plantae
- Clade: Tracheophytes
- Clade: Angiosperms
- Clade: Eudicots
- Clade: Asterids
- Order: Lamiales
- Family: Scrophulariaceae
- Genus: Verbascum
- Species: V. densiflorum

Binomial name
- Verbascum densiflorum Bertol.

Synonyms
- List: Verbascum thapsiforme subsp. densiflorum (Bertol.) Nyman; Verbascum bicolle Schrank; Verbascum cuspidatum Schrad.; Verbascum floccosum var. gymnostemon (Franch.) Rouy; Verbascum macrantherum Halácsy; Verbascum messanense Tineo; Verbascum phlomoides var. cuspidatum (Schrad.) Wirtg.; Verbascum phlomoides var. cuspidatum (Schrad.) Alef.; Verbascum phlomoides var. gymnostemon Franch.; Verbascum phlomoides subsp. thapsiforme (Schrad.) Čelak.; Verbascum phlomoides var. thapsiforme (Schrad.) P.Fourn.; Verbascum phlomoides subsp. thapsiforme Rouy; Verbascum thapsiforme Schrad.; Verbascum thapsiforme var. bicolle (Schrank) Gaudin; Verbascum thapsiforme subsp. cuspidatum (Schrad.) Arcang.; Verbascum thapsiforme var. laxum Klett & Richt.; Verbascum thapsiforme var. thapsonigrum Gaudin; Verbascum thapsus var. thapsiforme (Schrad.) Wahlenb.; Verbascum velenovskyi Horák

= Verbascum densiflorum =

Species of flowering plant

Verbascum densiflorum, also known as denseflower mullein and dense-flowered mullein, is a species of plant in the figwort family Scrophulariaceae.
