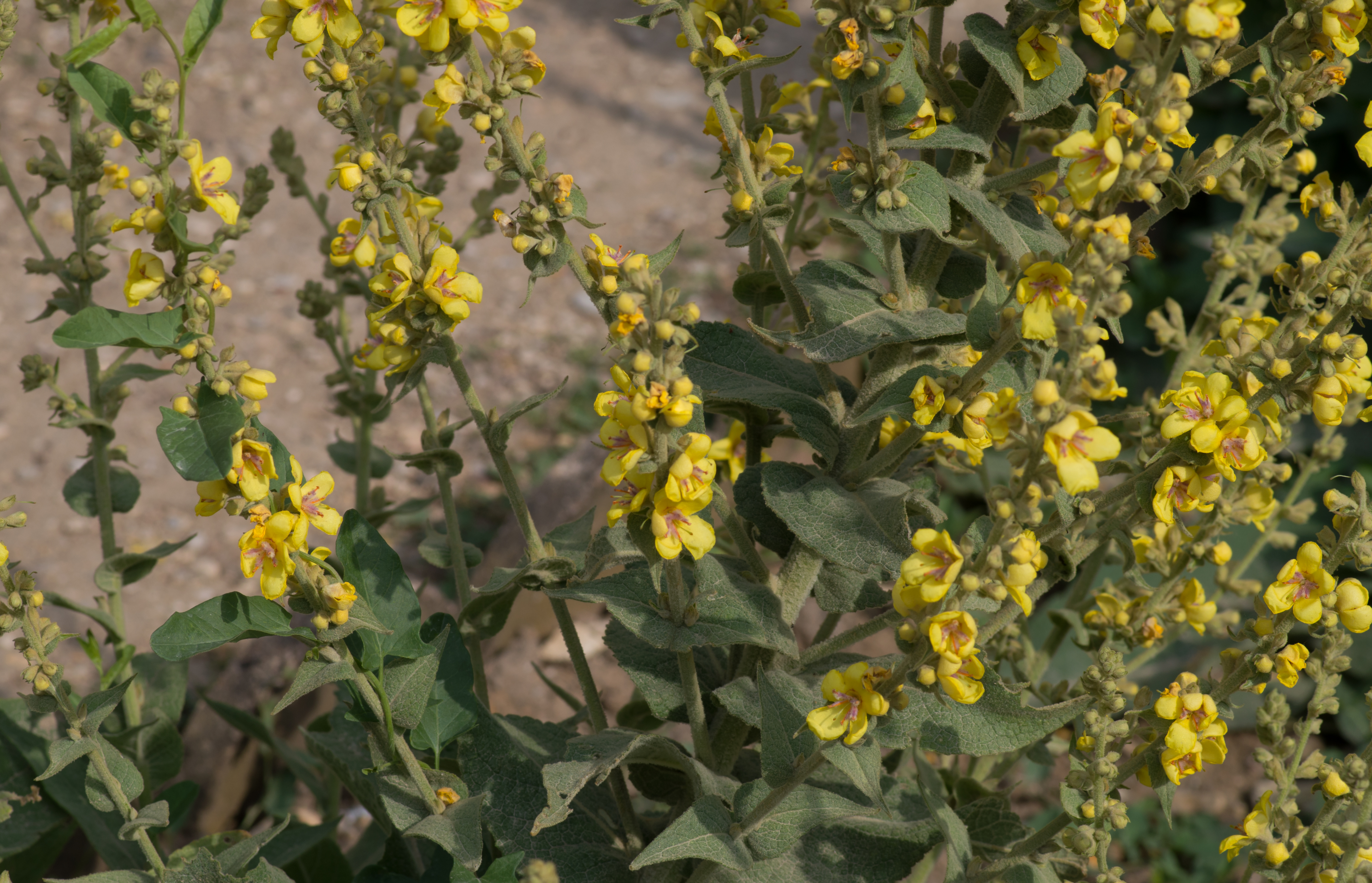
- At the Jardin des plantes de Paris

Scientific classification
- Kingdom: Plantae
- Clade: Embryophytes
- Clade: Tracheophytes
- Clade: Angiosperms
- Clade: Eudicots
- Clade: Asterids
- Order: Lamiales
- Family: Scrophulariaceae
- Genus: Verbascum
- Species: V. epixanthinum

Binomial name
- Verbascum epixanthinum Boiss. & Heldr.

Synonyms
- Verbascum adenotrichum Halácsy; Verbascum agrimonioides Degen & Borbás ex Formánek; Verbascum parnassicum Halácsy

= Verbascum epixanthinum =

Species of flowering plant

Verbascum epixanthinum, the yellow mullein, is a species of flowering plant in the family Scrophulariacee, native to Greece. Growing to 1 m (3.3 ft) tall, it is an erect herbaceous perennial with grey-green leaves, and dense 70 cm (28 in) spikes of yellow flowers in summer. Though perennial, it may be short-lived.

It has won the Royal Horticultural Society's Award of Garden Merit. It is hardy, but requires a sheltered position in full sun. It is also considered by the RHS to be a good plant to attract pollinators.
