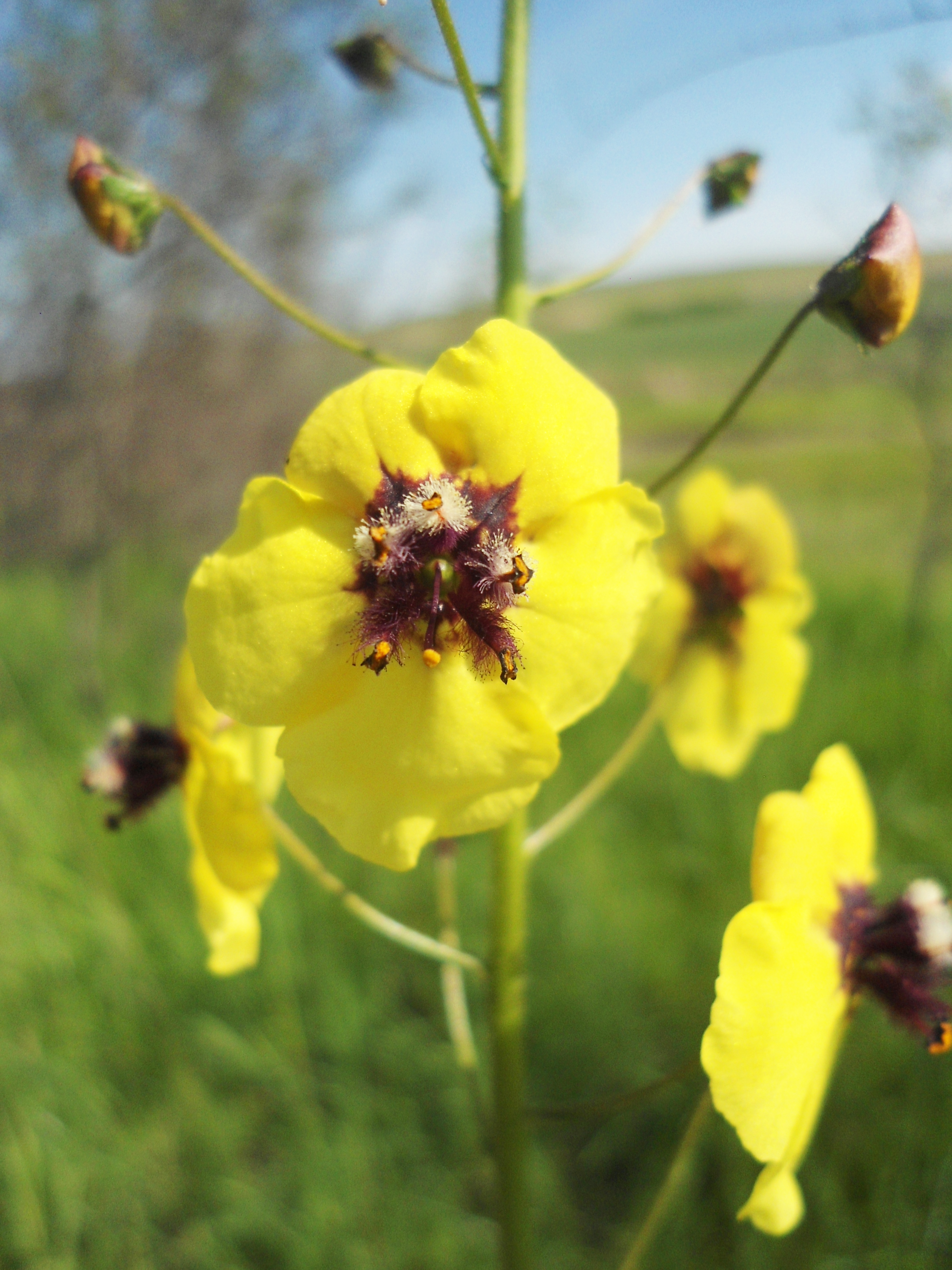

Scientific classification
- Kingdom: Plantae
- Clade: Tracheophytes
- Clade: Angiosperms
- Clade: Eudicots
- Clade: Asterids
- Order: Lamiales
- Family: Scrophulariaceae
- Genus: Verbascum
- Species: V. xanthophoeniceum

Binomial name
- Verbascum xanthophoeniceum Griseb.

Synonyms
- Verbascum blattarioides Wahlenb. ex Griseb., not validly publ.; Verbascum xanthophoeniceum var. albiflorum Voliotis

= Verbascum xanthophoeniceum =

Species of plant

Verbascum xanthophoeniceum is a binnenial plant belonging to the family Scrophulariaceae. It is native to Bulgaria, Greece, and European and Asian Turkey.
