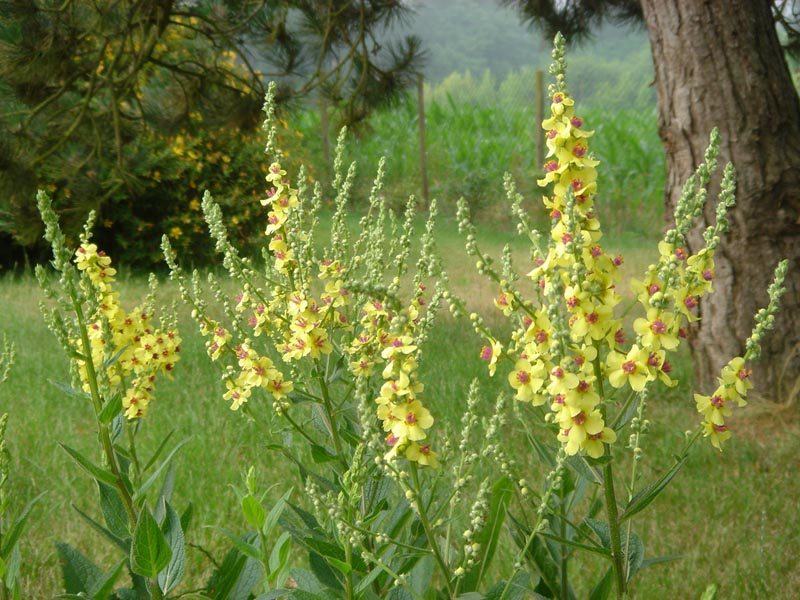
- 'Sixteen Candles' cultivar
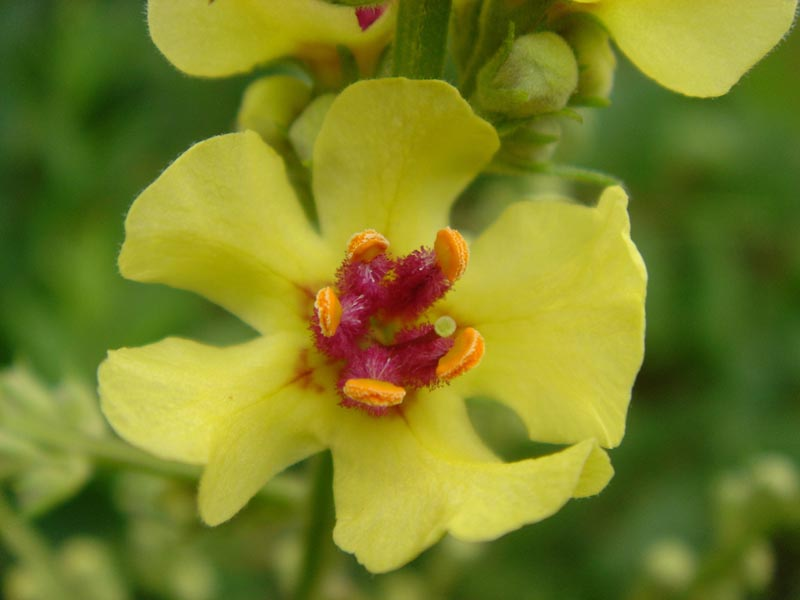
- Close up of flower

Scientific classification
- Kingdom: Plantae
- Clade: Embryophytes
- Clade: Tracheophytes
- Clade: Angiosperms
- Clade: Eudicots
- Clade: Asterids
- Order: Lamiales
- Family: Scrophulariaceae
- Genus: Verbascum
- Species: V. chaixii

Binomial name
- Verbascum chaixii Vill.

= Verbascum chaixii =

Species of flowering plant

Verbascum chaixii, the nettle-leaved mullein, is a species of flowering plant in the genus Verbascum, native to Spain, France, Italy (including Sicily), the former Yugoslavia, and Greece. It is considered a good plant to attract pollinators. With Verbascum bombyciferum it is a parent of the 'Pink Domino' cultivar, which has gained the Royal Horticultural Society's Award of Garden Merit.
