= Verbascum litigiosum =

Conservation status
- Vulnerable (IUCN 3.1)

Scientific classification
- Kingdom: Plantae
- Clade: Tracheophytes
- Clade: Angiosperms
- Clade: Eudicots
- Clade: Asterids
- Order: Lamiales
- Family: Scrophulariaceae
- Genus: Verbascum
- Species: V. litigiosum

Binomial name
- Verbascum litigiosum Samp.
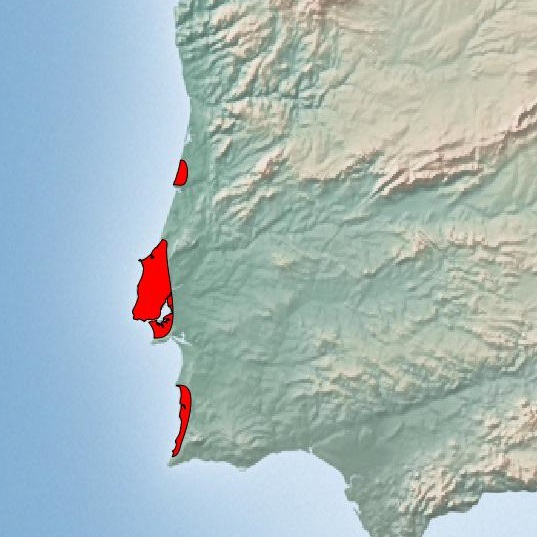
- Verbascum litigiosum distribution map

Synonyms
- Verbascum thapsus subsp. litigiosum (Samp.) A. Galán & Vicente Orell.

Species of flowering plant

Verbascum litigiosum is a species of mullein in the figwort family Scrophulariaceae, endemic to coastal Portugal. It inhabits coastal sands in secondary dunes, preferably in coastal areas close to limestone regions.

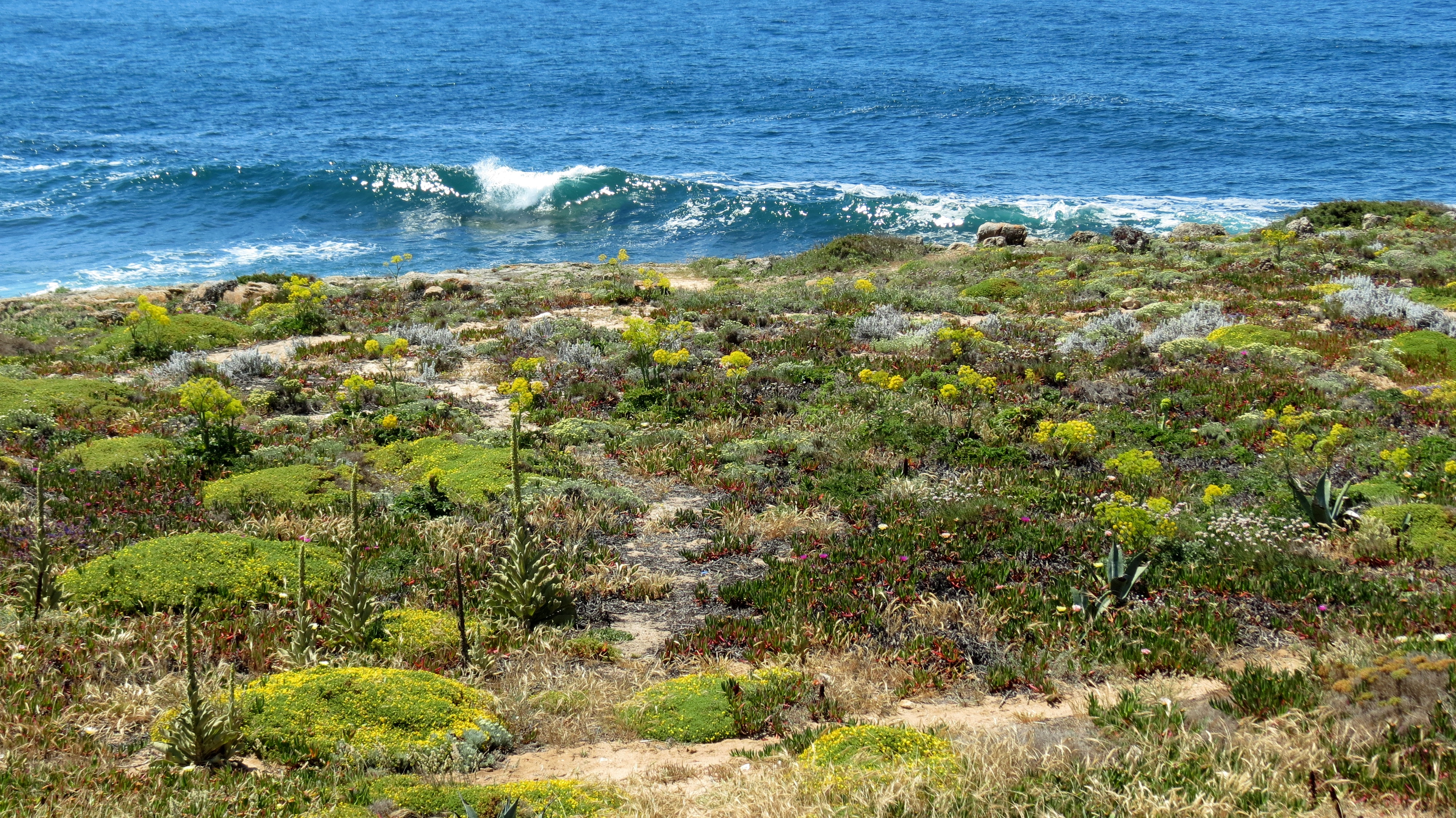
Verbascum litigiosum (bottom left) at Cabo Raso in May, along with native gorse, Thapsia and invasive Agave americana
