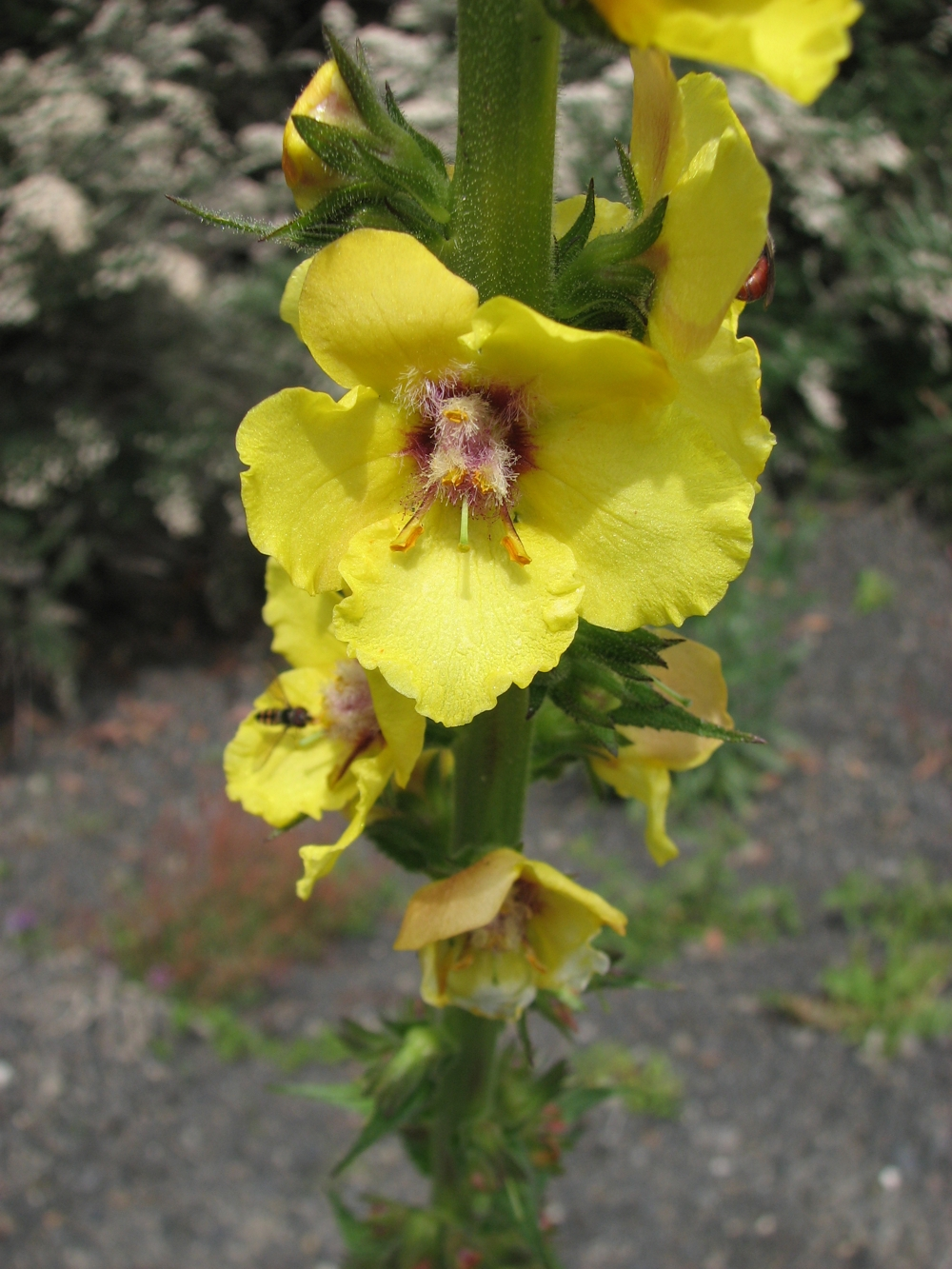

Scientific classification
- Kingdom: Plantae
- Clade: Tracheophytes
- Clade: Angiosperms
- Clade: Eudicots
- Clade: Asterids
- Order: Lamiales
- Family: Scrophulariaceae
- Genus: Verbascum
- Species: V. virgatum

Binomial name
- Verbascum virgatum Stokes

= Verbascum virgatum =

Species of flowering plant

Verbascum virgatum, commonly known as twiggy mullein and wand mullein, is a plant species in the family Scrophulariaceae.

== Description ==
It is a tall-growing biennial herb reaching a height of between 1 and 2 metres. The flowers are 3 to 4 cm in diameter and are yellow with a purple centre.

== Distribution ==
The species is native to Great Britain, Italy, France, the Iberian Peninsula, the Canary Islands and the Madeira Islands.

Additionally, it is naturalised in South Africa, North America, South America, Australia, New Zealand, Melanesia, Polynesia and the Azores.
