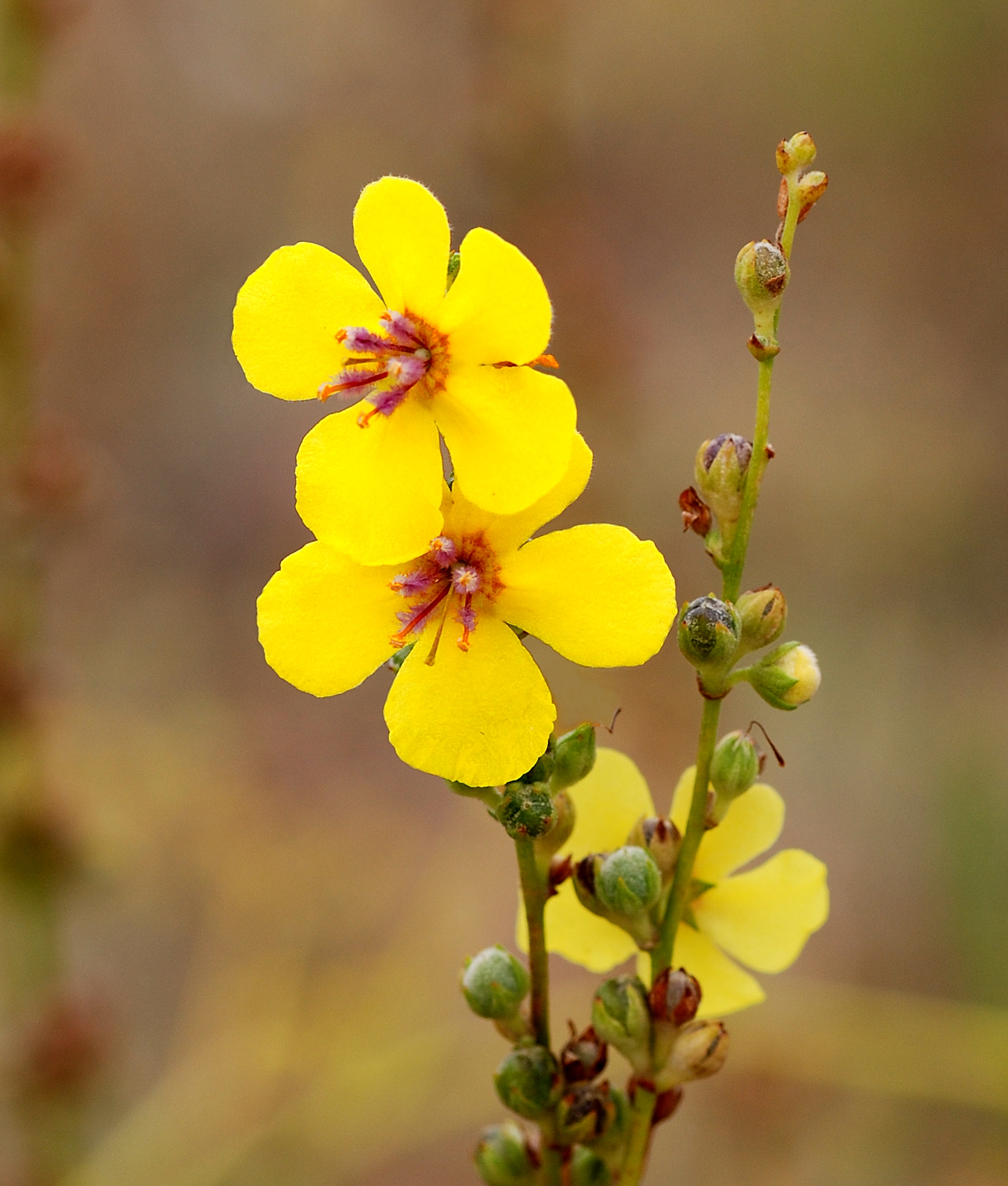
- Wavyleaf mullein, Verbascum sinuatum

Scientific classification
- Kingdom: Plantae
- Clade: Tracheophytes
- Clade: Angiosperms
- Clade: Eudicots
- Clade: Asterids
- Order: Lamiales
- Family: Scrophulariaceae
- Tribe: Scrophularieae
- Genus: Verbascum; L.

Type species
- Verbascum thapsus L.

Synonyms
- Celsia (L.); Rhabdotosperma (Hartl); Staurophragma (Fisch. & C. A. Mey.)

= Verbascum =

Genus of flowering plants

Verbascum is a genus of over 450 species of flowering plants, common name mullein (/ˈmʌlɪn/), in the figwort family Scrophulariaceae. They are native to Europe, Africa and Asia, with the highest species diversity in the Mediterranean.

Mullein or "mullein leaf" often refers to the leaves of Verbascum thapsus, the great or common mullein, which is frequently used in herbal medicine.

== Description ==
Verbascum are biennial or perennial plants, rarely annuals or subshrubs, growing to 0.5 to 3.0 m (1.6 to 9.8 ft) tall. The plants first form a dense rosette of leaves at ground level, subsequently sending up a tall flowering stem. Biennial plants form the rosette the first year and the stem the following season. The leaves are spirally arranged, often densely hairy, though glabrous (hairless) in some species. The flowers have five symmetrical petals; petal colours in different species include yellow (most common), orange, red-brown, purple, blue, or white. The fruit is a capsule containing numerous minute seeds.

== Cultivation ==
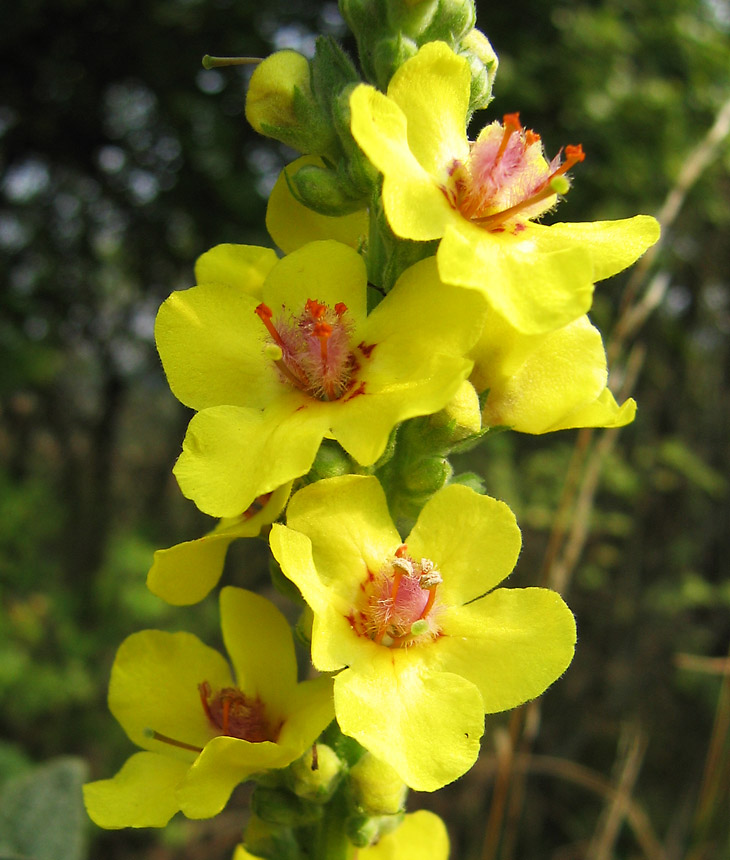
Dark mullein (V. nigrum)

In gardening and landscaping, the mulleins are valued for their tall narrow stature and for flowering over a long period of time, even in dry soils.

These cultivars have received the Royal Horticultural Society's Award of Garden Merit:

- 'Gainsborough' (Cotswold Group)
- 'Letitia'
- 'Pink Domino' (Cotswold Group)
- 'Tropic Sun'

== Select species ==
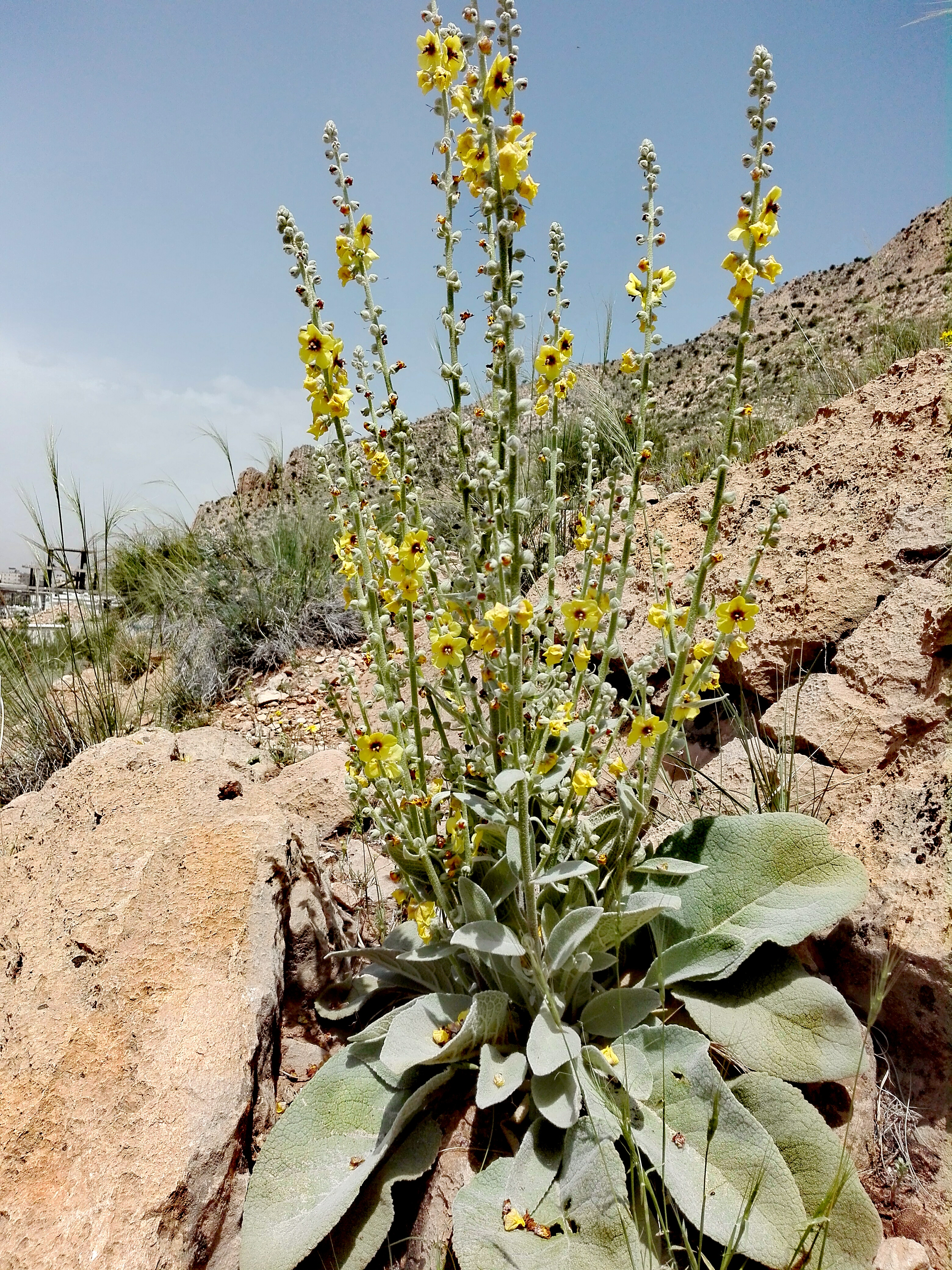
Verbascum sp.

- Verbascum acaule ((Bory & Chaub.) Kuntze)
- Verbascum adeliae (Heldr.)
- Verbascum adenanthum (Bornm.)
- Verbascum adrianopolitanum (Podp.)
- Verbascum agrimoniifolium (Huber-Morath)
- Verbascum anisophyllum (Murb.)
- Verbascum arcturus (L.)
- Verbascum argenteum (Ten.)
- Verbascum austriacum (Schott)
- Verbascum baldaccii (Degen)
- Verbascum banaticum (Schrad.)
- Verbascum barnadesii (Vahl)
- Verbascum bithynicum (Boiss.)
- Verbascum blattaria (L.)
- Verbascum boerhavei (L.)
- Verbascum boissieri ((Heldr. & Sart. ex Boiss.) Kuntze)
- Verbascum botuliforme (Murb.)
- Verbascum brevipedicellatum ((Engl.) Hub.-Mor.)
- Verbascum bugulifolium (Lam.)
- Verbascum calycosum (Hausskn. ex Murb.)
- Verbascum × candelabrum (Kar. & Kir.)
- Verbascum chaixii (Vill.)
- Verbascum chinense ((L.) Santapau)
- Verbascum creticum ((L.f.) Cav.)
- Verbascum cylindrocarpum (Griseb.)
- Verbascum cylleneum ((Boiss. & Heldr.) Kuntze)
- Verbascum daenzeri ((Fauché & Chaub.) Fenzl)
- Verbascum davidoffii (Murb.)
- Verbascum decorum (Velen.)
- Verbascum delphicum (Boiss. & Heldr.)
- Verbascum densiflorum (Bertol.)
- Verbascum dentifolium (Delile)
- Verbascum dieckianum (Borbás & Degen)
- Verbascum dingleri (Mattf. & Stef.)
- Verbascum drymophiloides (Gritzenko)
- Verbascum durmitoreum (Rohlena)
- Verbascum × edirnense (Dane & G.Yılmaz)
- Verbascum epixanthinum (Boiss. & Heldr.)
- Verbascum eriophorum (Godr.)
- Verbascum eskisehirensis (Karavel., Ocak & Ekici)
- Verbascum euboicum (Murb. & Rech.f.)
- Verbascum flavidum ((Boiss.) Freyn & Bornm.)
- Verbascum × gabrielianae (Hub.-Mor.)
- Verbascum georgicum (Benth.)
- Verbascum glabratum (Friv.)
- Verbascum glandulosum (Delile)
- Verbascum gnaphalodes (M.Bieb.)
- Verbascum graecum (Heldr. & Sart.)
- Verbascum guicciardii (Heldr.)
- Verbascum halacsyanum (Sint. & Bornm. ex Halácsy)
- Verbascum haraldi-adnani (Parolly & Eren)
- Verbascum hervieri (Degen)
- Verbascum herzogii (Bornm.)
- Verbascum humile (Janka)
- Verbascum jankaeanum (Pančić)
- Verbascum laciniatum ((Poir.) Kuntze)
- Verbascum lagurus (Fisch. & C.A.Mey.)
- Verbascum lanatum (Schrad.)
- Verbascum lasianthum (Boiss. ex Benth.)
- Verbascum laxum (Filar. & Jav.)
- Verbascum leucophyllum (Griseb.)
- Verbascum lesnovoensis (Micevski)
- Verbascum levanticum (I.K.Ferguson)
- Verbascum litigiosum (Samp.)
- Verbascum longifolium (Ten.)
- Verbascum lychnitis (L.)
- Verbascum macedonicum (Kosonin & Murb.)
- Verbascum macrocarpum (Boiss.)
- Verbascum macrurum (Ten.)
- Verbascum mallophorum (Boiss. & Heldr.)
- Verbascum megricum (Huber-Morath)
- Verbascum mucronatum (Lam.)
- Verbascum nevadense (Boiss.)
- Verbascum nicolai (Rohlena)
- Verbascum nigrum (L.)
- Verbascum niveum (Ten.)
- Verbascum nobile (Velen.)
- Verbascum nudicaule (Takht.)
- Verbascum olympicum (Boiss.)
- Verbascum oreophilum (C. Koch)
- Verbascum orientale ((L.) All.)
- Verbascum orphanideum (Murb.)
- Verbascum ovalifolium (Donn ex Sims)
- Verbascum ozturkii (Karavel., Uzunh. & S.Çelik)
- Verbascum × patris (Bordz.)
- Verbascum pelium (Halácsy)
- Verbascum pentelicum (Murb.)
- Verbascum phlomoides (L.)
- Verbascum phoeniceum (L.)
- Verbascum pinnatifidum (Vahl)
- Verbascum pseudonobile (Stoj. & Stef.)
- Verbascum pterocaulon (Nyman)
- Verbascum pulverulentum (Vill.)
- Verbascum purpureum ((Janka) Hub.-Mor.)
- Verbascum pyramidatum (M.Bieb.)
- Verbascum reiseri (Halácsy)
- Verbascum roripifolium ((Halácsy) I.K.Ferguson)
- Verbascum rotundifolium (Ten.)
- Verbascum × rubiginosum (Waldst. & Kit.)
- Verbascum rupestre ((Davidov) I.K.Ferguson)
- Verbascum salgirensis (Soldano)
- Verbascum samniticum (Ten.)
- Verbascum schachdagense (Gritzenko)
- Verbascum siculum (Tod. ex Lojac.)
- Verbascum sinaiticum (Benth.)
- Verbascum sinuatum (L.)
- Verbascum songaricum (Schrenk)
- Verbascum speciosum (Schrad.)
- Verbascum spinosum (L.)
- Verbascum suworowianum (Kuntze)
- Verbascum szovitsianum (Boiss.)
- Verbascum thapsus (L.)
- Verbascum undulatum (Lam.)
- Verbascum vandasii ((Rohlena) Rohlena)
- Verbascum varians (Freyn & Sint.)
- Verbascum virgatum (Stokes)
- Verbascum xanthophoeniceum (Griseb.)
- Verbascum zuccarinii ((Boiss.) I.K.Ferguson)

== See also ==
- Mullein moth, a species in the order Lepidoptera which feeds on Verbascum and other plants.
