= List of Scrophularia species =

This is a list of species in the plant genus Scrophularia, commonly known as figworts. There are almost 300 species recognised in the genus Scrophularia:

== A ==
- Scrophularia aequilabris P.C.Tsoong
- Scrophularia aestivalis Griseb.
- Scrophularia alaschanica Batalin
- Scrophularia alata A.Gray
- Scrophularia alhagioides Attar & Joharchi
- Scrophularia alpestris J.Gay ex Benth.
- Scrophularia altaica Murray
- Scrophularia amadiyana Ghaz. & Haloob
- Scrophularia amana S.S.Lall
- Scrophularia amgunensis F.Schmidt
- Scrophularia amplexicaulis Benth.
- Scrophularia arguta Aiton
- Scrophularia atrata Pennell
- Scrophularia atroglandulosa Grau
- Scrophularia atropatana Grossh.
- Scrophularia attariae Ranjbar & Rahch.
- Scrophularia auriculata L.
- Scrophularia azerbaijanica Grau

== B ==
- Scrophularia badakhshanica Grau
- Scrophularia badghysi Botsch.
- Scrophularia bahorucana Zanoni
- Scrophularia bheriensis T.Yamaz.
- Scrophularia birmanica H.L.Li
- Scrophularia bitlisica S.S.Lall
- Scrophularia bosniaca Beck
- Scrophularia botryoides Grau
- Scrophularia botschanzevii Turak.
- Scrophularia buergeriana Miq.
- Scrophularia bulgarica (Stoj.) Peev

== C ==
- Scrophularia cabulica Benth.
- Scrophularia californica Cham. & Schltdl.
- Scrophularia calliantha Webb & Berthel.
- Scrophularia calycina Benth.
- Scrophularia canescens Bong.
- Scrophularia canina L.
- Scrophularia capillaris Boiss. & Balansa
- Scrophularia carduchorum R.R.Mill
- Scrophularia catariifolia Boiss. & Heldr.
- Scrophularia charadzae Kem.-Nath.
- Scrophularia chasmophila W.W.Sm.
- Scrophularia chlorantha Kotschy & Boiss.
- Scrophularia chrysantha Jaub. & Spach
- Scrophularia clematidifolia Eig
- Scrophularia cooperi R.R.Mill
- Scrophularia × costei Biau
- Scrophularia crassicaulis Boiss.
- Scrophularia crassipedunculata Attar & Joharchi
- Scrophularia crassiuscula Grau
- Scrophularia crenophila Boiss.
- Scrophularia cretacea Fisch. ex Spreng.
- Scrophularia cryptophila Boiss. & Heldr.
- Scrophularia czapandaghi B.Fedtsch.
- Scrophularia czernjakowskiana B.Fedtsch.

== D ==
- Scrophularia decomposita Royle ex Benth.
- Scrophularia delavayi Franch.
- Scrophularia denaensis Attar
- Scrophularia densifolia Urb. & Ekman
- Scrophularia dentata Royle ex Benth.
- Scrophularia depauperata Boiss.
- Scrophularia deserti Delile
- Scrophularia desertorum (Munz) R.J.Shaw
- Scrophularia dianatnejadii Ranjbar & Rahch.
- Scrophularia diffusa Sommier & Levier
- Scrophularia diplodonta Franch.
- Scrophularia divaricata Ledeb.
- Scrophularia domingensis Urb.
- Scrophularia dshungarica Golosk. & Tzag.
- Scrophularia duplicatoserrata Makino

== E ==
- Scrophularia edelbergii Rech.f.
- Scrophularia edgeworthii Benth.
- Scrophularia eggersii Urb.
- Scrophularia elatior Wall. ex Benn.
- Scrophularia elbursensis Bornm.
- Scrophularia elymaitica Mozaff.
- Scrophularia eriocalyx Emb. & Maire
- Scrophularia erzincanica R.R.Mill
- Scrophularia exilis Popl.

== F ==
- Scrophularia fargesii Franch.
- Scrophularia fatmae Kandemir & Ilhan
- Scrophularia fedtschenkoi Gorschk.
- Scrophularia flava Grau
- Scrophularia floribunda Boiss. & Balansa
- Scrophularia fontqueri Ortega Oliv. & Devesa
- Scrophularia formosana H.L.Li
- Scrophularia frigida Boiss.
- Scrophularia frutescens L.

== G ==
- Scrophularia galilaea Eig
- Scrophularia gaubae Bornm.
- Scrophularia ghahremanii Attar & Hamzehee
- Scrophularia glabella Botsch. & Junussov
- Scrophularia glabrata Aiton
- Scrophularia gontscharovii Gorschk.
- Scrophularia gorganica Rech.f.
- Scrophularia gracilis Blakelock
- Scrophularia grandiflora DC.
- Scrophularia granitica Klokov & Krasnova
- Scrophularia grayanoides M.Kikuchi
- Scrophularia gypsicola Hub.-Mor. & Lall

== H ==
- Scrophularia haematantha Boiss. & Heldr.
- Scrophularia henryi Hemsl.
- Scrophularia herminii Hoffmanns. & Link
- Scrophularia heterophylla Willd.
- Scrophularia heucheriiflora Schrenk ex Fisch. & C.A.Mey.
- Scrophularia hierochuntina Boiss.
- Scrophularia hilbigii Jäger
- Scrophularia himalensis Royle ex Benth.
- Scrophularia hirta Lowe
- Scrophularia horizontalis Rech.f.
- Scrophularia hypericifolia Wydler
- Scrophularia hypsophila Hand.-Mazz.
- Scrophularia hyssopifolia Boiss. & Hausskn.

== I ==
- Scrophularia ilwensis K.Koch
- Scrophularia imerethica Kem.-Nath.
- Scrophularia incisa Weinm.
- Scrophularia integrifolia Pavlov
- Scrophularia iranica Attar
- Scrophularia ispahanica Attar & Nowrouzi

== J-K ==
- Scrophularia jafrii Khatoon & Qaiser
- Scrophularia jinii P.Li
- Scrophularia kabadianensis B.Fedtsch.
- Scrophularia kakudensis Franch.
- Scrophularia kamelinii Botsch. & Kurbanov
- Scrophularia kansuensis Batalin
- Scrophularia kermanica Ghahr. & Mirtadz.
- Scrophularia khorassanica Attar & Joharchi
- Scrophularia kiriloviana Schischk.
- Scrophularia kjurendaghi Botsch. & Kurbanov
- Scrophularia koeiei Rech.f.
- Scrophularia koelzii Pennell
- Scrophularia kollakii S.A.Ahmad
- Scrophularia kotschyana Benth.
- Scrophularia kurbanovii Botsch.
- Scrophularia kurdica Eig

== L ==
- Scrophularia laevigata Vahl
- Scrophularia laevis Wooton & Standl.
- Scrophularia lanceolata Pursh
- Scrophularia landroveri Wendelbo
- Scrophularia laportifolia T.Yamaz.
- Scrophularia lateriflora Trautv.
- Scrophularia laxiflora Lange
- Scrophularia lepidota Boiss.
- Scrophularia leucoclada Bunge
- Scrophularia lhasaensis D.Y.Hong
- Scrophularia libanotica Boiss.
- Scrophularia lijangensis T.Yamaz.
- Scrophularia litvinovii B.Fedtsch.
- Scrophularia longiflora Benth.
- Scrophularia lowei Dalgaard
- Scrophularia lucida L.
- Scrophularia lucidaifolia Uzunh. & E.Doğan
- Scrophularia luridiflora Fisch. & C.A.Mey.

== M ==
- Scrophularia macrantha Greene ex Stiefelh.
- Scrophularia macrobotrys Ledeb.
- Scrophularia macrocarpa P.C.Tsoong
- Scrophularia macrophylla Boiss.
- Scrophularia macrorrhyncha (Humbert, Litard. & Maire) Ibn Tattou
- Scrophularia maharluica Ranjbar & Rahch.
- Scrophularia mandarinorum Franch.
- Scrophularia mandshurica Maxim.
- Scrophularia mapienensis P.C.Tsoong
- Scrophularia marginata Boiss.
- Scrophularia marilandica L.
- Scrophularia megalantha Rech.f.
- Scrophularia mersinensis S.S.Lall
- Scrophularia mesopotamica Boiss.
- Scrophularia mexicana Mayfield & G.L.Nesom
- Scrophularia minima M.Bieb.
- Scrophularia minutiflora Pennell
- Scrophularia modesta Kitag.
- Scrophularia moellendorffii Maxim.
- Scrophularia mollis Sommier & Levier
- Scrophularia moniziana Menezes
- Scrophularia montana Wooton
- Scrophularia morisii Vals.
- Scrophularia multicaulis Turcz.
- Scrophularia musashiensis Bonati
- Scrophularia myriophylla Boiss. & Heldr.

== N ==
- Scrophularia nabataeorum Eig
- Scrophularia nachitschevanica Grossh.
- Scrophularia nana Stiefelh.
- Scrophularia nankinensis P.C.Tsoong
- Scrophularia nervosa Benth.
- Scrophularia nikitinii Gorschk.
- Scrophularia ningpoensis Hemsl.
- Scrophularia nodosa L.
- Scrophularia nudata Pennell
- Scrophularia nuraniae Tzag.

== O ==
- Scrophularia oblongifolia Loisel.
- Scrophularia obtusa Edgew. ex Hook.f.
- Scrophularia olgae Grossh.
- Scrophularia olympica Boiss.
- Scrophularia omeri Khatoon & Qaiser
- Scrophularia orientalis L.
- Scrophularia oxyrhyncha Coincy
- Scrophularia oxysepala Boiss.

== P ==
- Scrophularia pallescens Lowe ex Menezes
- Scrophularia pamirica (O.Fedtsch.) Ivanina
- Scrophularia pamiroalaica Gorschk.
- Scrophularia paphlagonica R.R.Mill
- Scrophularia papyracea Attar
- Scrophularia parviflora Wooton & Standl.
- Scrophularia pauciflora Benth.
- Scrophularia pegaea Hand.-Mazz.
- Scrophularia peregrina L.
- Scrophularia petraea Aitch. & Hemsl.
- Scrophularia peyronii Post
- Scrophularia pinardii Boiss.
- Scrophularia pindicola Hausskn.
- Scrophularia pluriflora Urb. & Ekman
- Scrophularia polyantha Royle ex Benth.
- Scrophularia potaninii Ivanina
- Scrophularia prasiifolia Boiss. & Hausskn.
- Scrophularia pruinosa Boiss.
- Scrophularia przewalskii Batalin
- Scrophularia puberula Boiss.
- Scrophularia pulverulenta Boiss. & Noë
- Scrophularia pumilio S.S.Lall
- Scrophularia pyrenaica Benth.

== R ==
- Scrophularia racemosa Lowe
- Scrophularia rechingeri Grau
- Scrophularia regelii Ivanina
- Scrophularia rimarum Bornm.
- Scrophularia × ritae Mateo
- Scrophularia robusta Pennell
- Scrophularia rodinii Hamidullah
- Scrophularia rostrata Boiss. & Buhse
- Scrophularia rosulata Stiefelh.
- Scrophularia rubricaulis Boiss.
- Scrophularia rudolfii F.O.Khass., Serekeeva & Kadyrov
- Scrophularia rupestris M.Bieb. ex Willd.
- Scrophularia ruprechtii Boiss.

== S ==
- Scrophularia sambucifolia L.
- Scrophularia sangtodensis B.Fedtsch.
- Scrophularia sanguinea Grau
- Scrophularia sardashtensis Ranjbar & Rahch.
- Scrophularia scabiosifolia Benth.
- Scrophularia scariosa Boiss.
- Scrophularia schiraziana Attar & Hatami
- Scrophularia scoparia Pennell
- Scrophularia scopolii Hoppe ex Pers.
- Scrophularia scorodonia L.
- Scrophularia serratifolia Hub.-Mor. & Lall
- Scrophularia shulabadensis Attar & Hamzehee
- Scrophularia singularis Rech.f.
- Scrophularia smithii Hornem.
- Scrophularia sosnowskyi Kem.-Nath.
- Scrophularia souliei Franch.
- Scrophularia spicata Franch.
- Scrophularia spinulescens Hausskn. & Degen
- Scrophularia sprengeriana Sommier & Levier
- Scrophularia stenothyrsa Pennell
- Scrophularia stewartii Pennell
- Scrophularia striata Boiss.
- Scrophularia strizhoviae Abdusal.
- Scrophularia stylosa P.C.Tsoong
- Scrophularia subaequiloba S.S.Lall
- Scrophularia subaphylla Boiss.
- Scrophularia sublyrata Brot.
- Scrophularia subsessilis R.R.Mill
- Scrophularia suffruticosa Pennell
- Scrophularia sulaimanica S.A.Ahmad

== T ==
- Scrophularia tadshikorum Gontsch.
- Scrophularia tagetifolia Boiss. & Hausskn.
- Scrophularia taihangshanensis C.S.Zhu & H.W.Yang
- Scrophularia takhtajanii Gabrieljan
- Scrophularia talassica Tzag.
- Scrophularia tanacetifolia Willd.
- Scrophularia tenuipes Coss. & Durieu
- Scrophularia thesioides Boiss. & Buhse
- Scrophularia tortuosissima Attar & Joharchi
- Scrophularia × towndrowii Druce
- Scrophularia trichopoda Boiss. & Balansa
- Scrophularia trifoliata L.
- Scrophularia tuerckheimii Urb.

== U-V ==
- Scrophularia uniflora Richt. ex Stapf
- Scrophularia urticifolia Wall. ex Benth.
- Scrophularia valdesii Ortega Oliv. & Devesa
- Scrophularia valida Grau
- Scrophularia variegata M.Bieb.
- Scrophularia vernalis L.
- Scrophularia versicolor Boiss.
- Scrophularia viciosoi Ortega Oliv. & Devesa
- Scrophularia villosa Pennell
- Scrophularia vvedenskyi Bondarenko & Filatova

== W-Z ==
- Scrophularia wattii (Hook.f.) P.Li
- Scrophularia xanthoglossa Boiss.
- Scrophularia xylobasis Rech.f.
- Scrophularia xylorrhiza Boiss. & Hausskn.
- Scrophularia yoshimurae T.Yamaz.
- Scrophularia yunnanensis Franch.
- Scrophularia zuvandica Grossh.
- Scrophularia zvartiana Gabrieljan
