= Mountain figwort =

Mountain figwort is a common name for several plants and may refer to:

- Scrophularia desertorum
- Scrophularia lanceolata
- Scrophularia montana
