= Doctrine of signatures =

Ancient herbalist theory

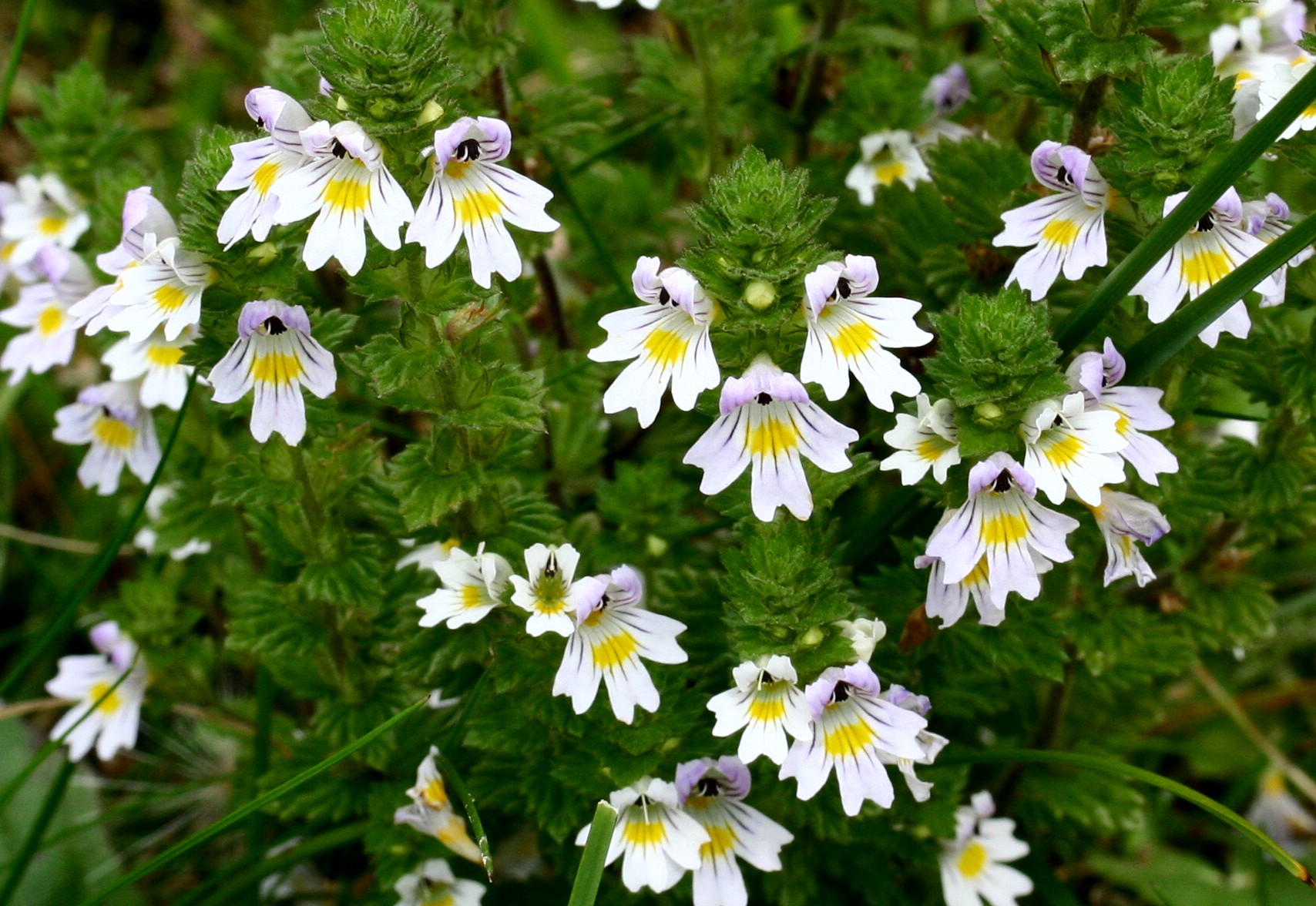
Eyebright was used for eye infections, owing to the supposed resemblance of its flower to an eye.

The doctrine of signatures, also known as the doctrine of correspondences or signaturism, is a biomedicinal theory of pseudoscience. It states that herbs or animals have physical or behavioral traits that mirror the ailment it can successfully treat. Theological justifications, such as that of botanist William Cole, were that God would want to show men what plants would be useful for. The doctrine of signatures has a debated origin. Many historians believe it begins with primitive thinking methods, while other historians believe it originated with Dioscorides and was popularized in the 16th and 17th centuries after Jakob Böhme coined the doctrine of signatures in his book The Signature of All Things. A holder of this doctrine was formarly called a signaturist.

This theory is a possible explanation for the ancient discovery of medicinal properties; however, there is no definitive proof as to whether the medicinal property or the connection in physical/behavioral traits was realized first. The theory later became a scientific basis for trying new remedies solely based upon their qualities in an attempt to find new medicines. While there are some homeopathic remedies that are still used today which have been connected to this theory, there are also remedies from this theory which have been found harmful. For instance, birthwort (so-called because of its resemblance to the uterus) was once used widely for pregnancies, but is carcinogenic and very damaging to the kidneys, owing to its aristolochic acid content. As a defense against predation, many plants contain toxic chemicals, the action of which is not immediately apparent or easily tied to the plant rather than other factors.

== History ==
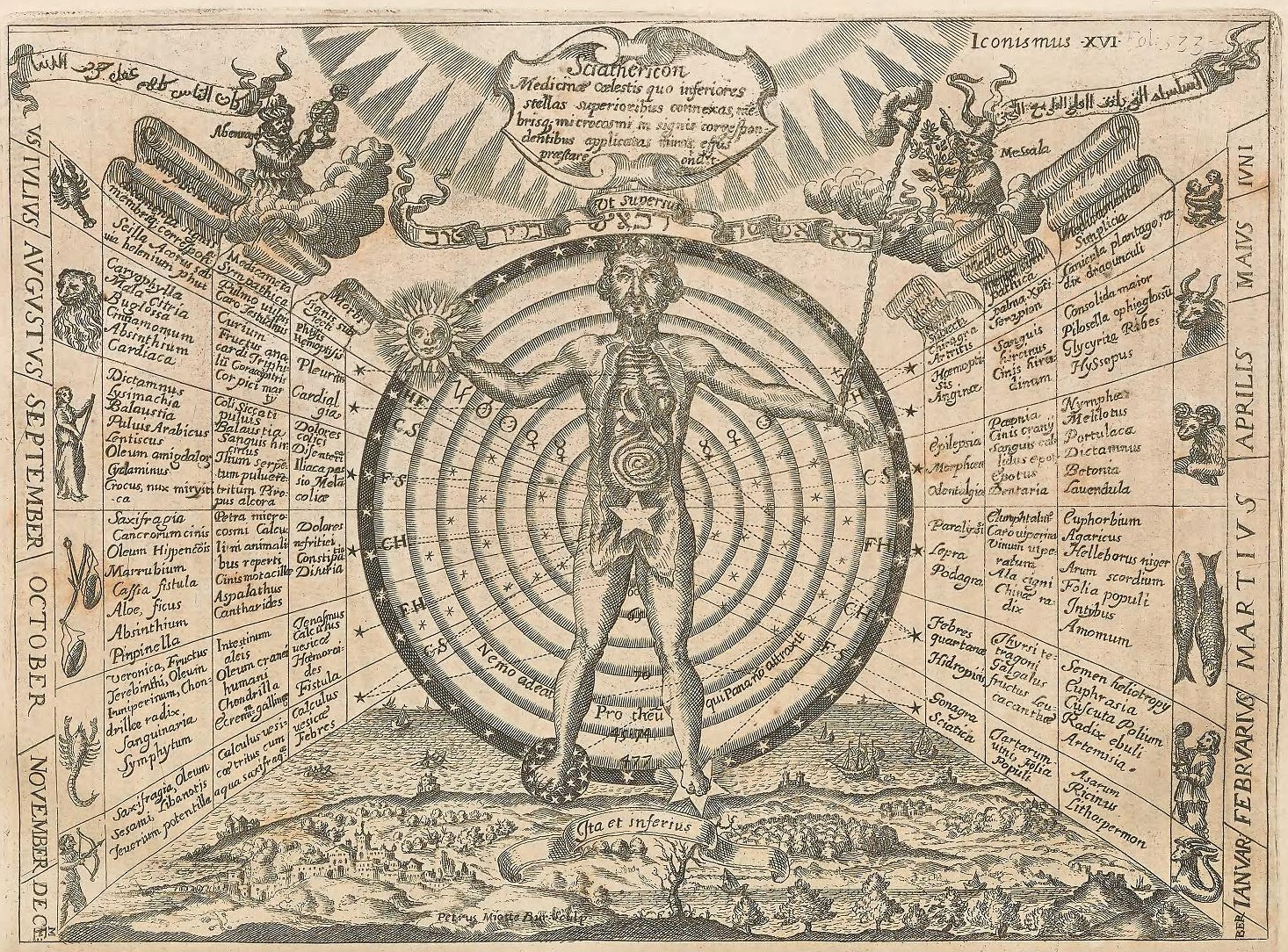
Diagram by Athanasius Kircher describing the relationship of the human body, constellations, and plants with signatures for medical use

The origins of the doctrine of signatures are debated by historians. The concept of the doctrine of signatures dates back to Hippocratic medicine and the belief that "cures for human ills were divinely revealed in nature, often through plants." The concept would be further developed by Dioscorides. Dioscorides would provide ample descriptions of plant medications through various drawings, detailing the importance of their look, name, shelf life, how to tell when plants have gone bad, and how to properly harvest the crop for medical use. Paracelsus (1493–1541) developed the concept further, writing that "nature marks each growth ... according to its curative benefit", and it was further developed by Giambattista della Porta in his Phytognomonica (1588).

The writings of Jakob Böhme (1575–1624) coined the term "doctrine of signatures" within his book The Signature of All Things (or Signatura Rerum), published in 1621. He suggested that God marked objects with a sign, or "signature", for their purpose, specifically that "to that Signature, his inward form is noted in the form of his face; and thus also is a beast, an herb, and the trees; every thing as it is inwardly [in its innate virtue and quality] so it is outwardly signed". Plants bearing parts that resembled human body parts, animals, or other objects were thought to have useful relevance to those parts, animals, or objects. The "signature" could sometimes also be identified in the environments or specific sites in which plants grew.

The English physician-philosopher Sir Thomas Browne, in his discourse The Garden of Cyrus (1658), uses the quincunx pattern as an archetype of the 'doctrine of signatures' pervading the design of gardens and orchards, botany, and the macrocosm at large.

The 17th-century botanist William Coles supposed that God had made "Herbes for the use of men, and hath given them particular Signatures, whereby a man may read the use of them." Coles's The Art of Simpling and Adam in Eden, stated that walnuts were good for curing head ailments because, in his opinion, "They have the perfect signatures of the head." Regarding Hypericum, he wrote, "The little holes whereof the leaves of Saint Johns wort are full, doe resemble all the pores of the skin and therefore it is profitable for all hurts and wounds that can happen thereunto."

In the late 19th century, Andrew Dickson White published his book History of the Warfare of Science with Theology in Christendom, which pushed back against the doctrine of signatures. White explains the connectiveness between Christianity and the doctrine of signatures as its increased presence and significance in the orthodox faith as theological pseudoscience. White further explains how the doctrine of signatures developed into the church as a justification to "[disgust] the demon with the body which he tormented" and how "the patient was made to swallow or apply to himself various unspeakable ordures", with various uses of animal organs as medications to protect against demons.

For the late medieval viewer, the natural world was vibrant with images of the Deity: 'as above, so below', a Hermetic principle expressed as the relationship between macrocosm and microcosm; the principle is rendered sicut in terra. Michel Foucault expressed the wider usage of the doctrine of signatures, which rendered allegory more real and more cogent than it appears to a modern eye:

Up to the end of the sixteenth century, resemblance played a constructive role in the knowledge of Western culture. It was resemblance that largely guided exegesis and the interpretation of texts; it was resemblance that organized the play of symbols, made possible knowledge of things visible and invisible, and controlled the art of representing them. (The Order of Things, p. 17)

Late 20th-century mentions of the doctrine of signatures include five cited publications in the 1996 Economic Botany Index (1947–1996). In the early 21st century, Amots Dafni and Efraim Lev conducted a survey and used literature to understand how the doctrine of signatures has evolved in the Middle East. Their studies show that the doctrine of signatures evolved into four main categories: "similarity of the plant or plant organ to the damaged human organ, similarity to animal shape or behavior, similarity of plant color to the color of the disease's symptoms or the medical phenomena, and similarity of plant habitat or characteristic to human features."

== Linked remedies ==
Name	Link to doctrine	History of use	Effectiveness
Common figwort (Scrophulariaceae) Sample of Scrophularia capillaris and root structure	Figwort's roots have small nodules that resemble nodes within the lymph system or swelling.	Used in Spain to treat hemorrhoids, digestive conditions, respiratory conditions, and skin conditions. In ancient China, Scrophularia ningpoensis, another member of the Scrophulariaceae family, was used for sore throats, abscesses, carbuncles, and constipation. Native American women in the Shenandoah Valley would use this plant after childbirth to prevent bleeding and cramps or as a calming tonic. The treatment linked to the doctrine of signs was for inflammation and conditions that cause lymph node swelling, which are thought to resemble the root nodules.	Study of this plant has correlated it with anti-inflammatory effects. This is potentially linked to the fact that this species has iridoids, which can exhibit anti-inflammatory and antioxidant properties.
Eyebright aka Euphrasy/Euphrasia (Euphrasia rostkoviana) Euphrasia flower	Named "eyebright" because its flower blossoms resemble eyes.	Used in medieval Europe to treat conditions that have to do with irritated or swollen eyes, like cataracts or conjunctivitis. They also were used for digestive conditions, jaundice, diabetes, and respiratory conditions. Some of these treatments are not eye-related and thus do not reflect the doctrine.	Contains flavonoids and polyphenols, which have been linked to lowered inflammation by interacting with cytokines. Extracts of the plant have successfully shown antibacterial properties, specifically with gram-positive bacteria. It is still used and effective within conjunctivitis and blepharitis treatments through eye drops.
Swallowwort (Papaveraceae) Swallowwort plant	Linked through animal behavior, "some say that this [the name] was because it flowered at about the time the swallows reappeared and finished when they left; but there grew a story that swallow mothers bathed their blind nestlings with its [figwort's] juices to help them see." Swallowwort may also be referred to as celandine (species Chelidonium majus in the family Papaveraceae), and this is cited as being linked to the doctrine because of the yellow latex believed to link with jaundice and liver bile.	In traditional Chinese medicine, this plant was used for the treatment of jaundice, accumulation of fluids, or clots. In other regions it was used for ulcers, liver conditions, digestive complaints, oral infections, tuberculosis, and dermatological conditions.	"Isoquinoline alkaloids, flavonoids, carotenoids, saponins, organic acids, and vitamins A and C are the distinct biologically active compounds of C. majus. According to the metabolites identified, it has been found to possess a range of pharmacological effects such as antimicrobial activity, anti-inflammatory, analgesic, natriuretic, antidiuretic, and anticancer effects." The plant has been linked with hepatotoxicity. Due to the cause of this side effect being under investigation, medicinal use in high or consistent doses is unusual due to potential health effects.
Birthwort (Aristolochia clematitis) Aristolochia clematitis	Said to resemble the womb and birth canal in shape and believed to provide a good birth.	Utilized in India, Greece, and China to induce menstruation (emmenagogues), induce labor, abortive measures, contraception, fever reduction (febrifuge), bladder stones, edemas, and gout. It was also combined with quicklime and used as fish poison.	This plant has been linked with aristolochic acid nephropathy, which can cause progressive interstitial fibrosis—a lung disease—and bladder, kidney, or urethral cancers. Specifically, it is linked to urothelial neoplasms, a precancerous cell in the urinary system.
Hedge woundwort (Stachys sylvatica) Stachys sylvatica	Believed to treat wounds and bruises because the plants themselves have holes in the leaves.	During the medieval period, flowers were ground, mixed with salt, and used on spear and sword wounds.	Both the flower and leaf extract show antibacterial and antioxidant attributes, which help to control oxidative stress and risk of infection in healing.
Liverwort (Marchantiophyta or Hepatica) Illustration of Hepatica plant	The mat-forming liverworts resembled lobes of the liver.	"Antimicrobial, antifungal, antipyretic, antidotal activity; used to cure cuts, burns, scalds, fractures, swollen tissue, poisonous snake bites and gallstones".	There is some scientific support for specific species having properties that can aid treatment of hepatitis, blisters, gastrointestinal complaints, and fever. This is linked to antibacterial and antifungal properties. Liverworts also have metabolites that interact with the central nervous system and thus can have serious side effects.
Lungwort (Pulmonaria officinalis) Lungwort plant	The spotted leaves resemble structures within the lungs.	Was used in Europe to treat phthisis, another name for tuberculosis.	Within a 2022 systematic review of scientific research, Chauhan and associates concluded that "safety studies and clinical trials are missing for lungworts to establish most of their potential biological properties."
Spleenwort (Asplenium) Spleenwort plant	The grass is said to resemble both hair and worms and is used to treat worms or hair loss.	Usually ingested as a tea used to relieve stomach issues and parasitic worm infections in both Europe and China.	As of 2021, systematic reviews of different medicinal applications showed no scientific consensus that they are effective in treating any conditions.
Walnuts (Juglans) Walnut nut and shell	Believed to treat brain-related conditions because the seed resembles a brain or gastrointestinal complaints because of the appearance of the intestines.	Used to treat headaches.	Walnuts contain fatty acids, which are valuable for the brain. From a medicinal standpoint, there is not a significant evidence base that it can prevent cognitive decline.

It is worth noting that it is possible that these are post hoc attributions—the appearance and treatment linked after the medicinal property was discovered. Depending on the article, remedies connected to the doctrine vary in number and consistency.

== Scientific, spiritual, and social context ==
Signatures are often described as post hoc attributions and mnemonics used to remember the properties of a plant rather than the reason it was originally used. There is no scientific or historical evidence that plant shapes and colors have aided in the discovery of their medical uses.

In Europe, the idea of doctrine of signatures was linked with Christian beliefs. However, similar theories were created within black magic with sympathetic magic. Similar theories have been observed all over the world in ancient Egypt, China, pre-Columbian America, and the Middle East. This can also explain how varied, and at times contradictory, applications of the doctrine can be because traditional botany is subject to optimal foraging theory. Remedies would, in many cases, be based on the environmental availability of that resource rather than its objective effectiveness.

Some sociologists frame the doctrine of signatures as a type of "enchantment", the idea that it is not just what one observes but how they observe it, and it was a device used to elevate a group of "elite" observers who could interpret the world with more accuracy. In this context, the elite observers would be those that, for example, notice that lungwort's leaves look like lung tissue rather than positing that the dark red flowers could look like blood clots or the pink petals like irritated skin. The idea being that within many descriptors, the "correct" one that links to the signature could only be found by someone within this elite group.

There are similar yet conflicting theories like the theory of opposites, where Galen supposed that a cold and wet thing could be used to treat an imbalance in a hot and dry organ. Hypotheses like these and the questions they posed, regardless of the validity of the hypotheses themselves, inspired scientific investigations into the safety and usefulness of many plant-based remedies.

== In literature and television ==
The phrase "signatures of all things" appears in the beginning of episode three in James Joyce's novel Ulysses. The character Stephen Dedalus is walking along the beach, thinking to himself, "Signatures of all things I am here to read, seaspawn and seawrack, the nearing tide, that rusty boot". The Canadian poet Anne Szumigalski, 1922–1999, entitled her third full-length collection Doctrine of Signatures. The doctrine of signatures is a major plot point in the Lewis episode "The Soul of Genius" (Series 6, 2012).

== See also ==
- Table of magical correspondences
- Sympathetic magic
- Naturalistic fallacy
- Pictogram
