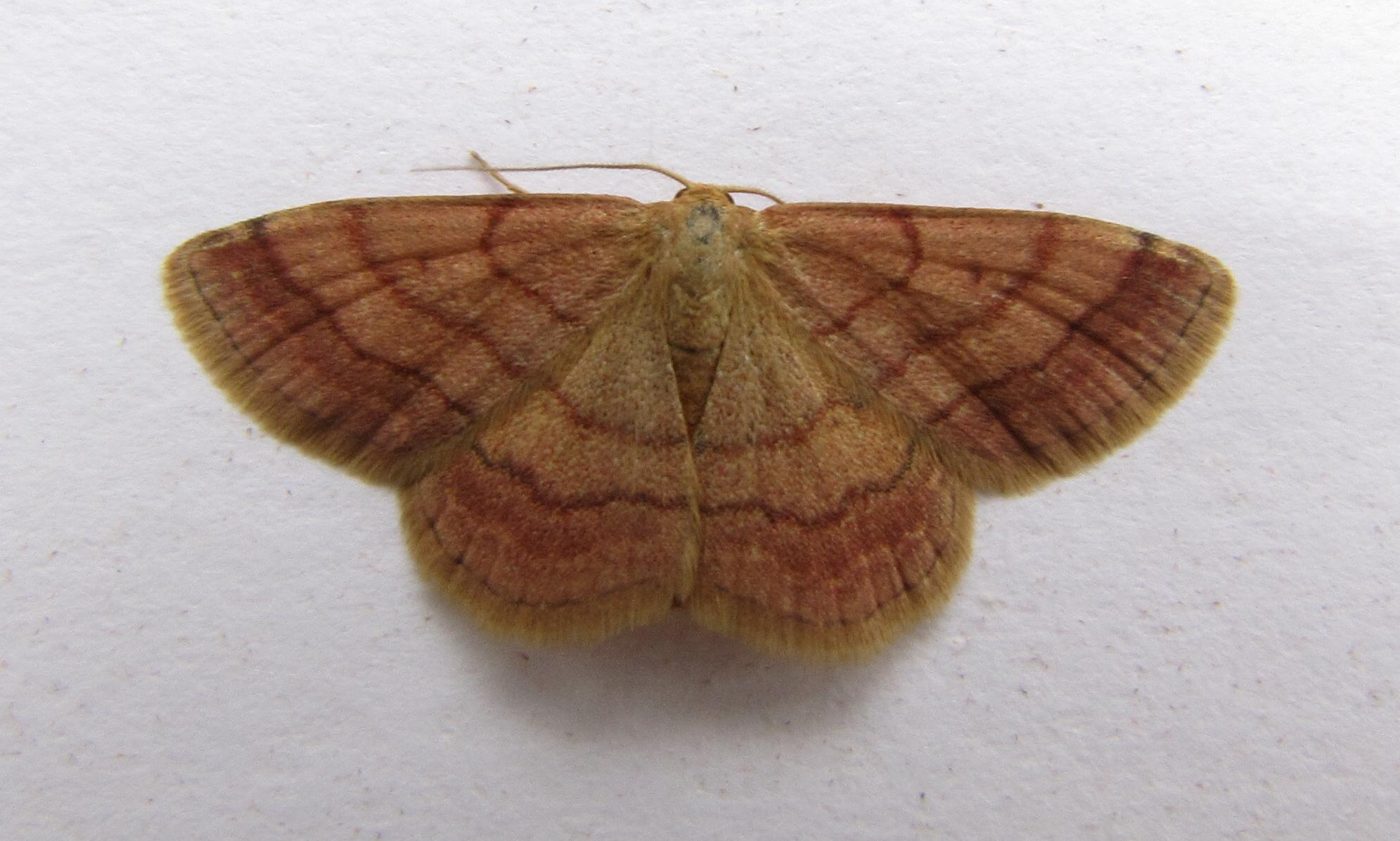
- Mounted specimen

Scientific classification
- Kingdom: Animalia
- Phylum: Arthropoda
- Class: Insecta
- Order: Lepidoptera
- Family: Geometridae
- Genus: Scopula
- Species: S. rubiginata

Binomial name
- Scopula rubiginata (Hufnagel, 1767)

Synonyms
- List: Phalaena rubiginata Hufnagel, 1767; Phalaena domialla Fourcroy, 1785; Geometra rubricaria Hubner, 1799; Geometra rubricata Denis & Schiffermuller, 1775; Idaea subangularia Herrich-Schaffer, 1839; Phalaena Geometra variata Villers, 1789; Geometra vittata Thunberg, 1784

= Scopula rubiginata =

Species of geometer moth in subfamily Sterrhinae

Scopula rubiginata, the tawny wave, is a moth of the family Geometridae. The species was first described by Johann Siegfried Hufnagel in 1767.

== Subspecies ==
Subspecies Scopula rubiginata ochraceata Staudinger, 1901 is mostly treated as a species, Scopula ochraceata.

== Etymology ==
The Latin species name rubiginata means "rusty", with reference to the coloration of the wings.

== Distribution and habitat ==
This species is present from the Iberian Peninsula up to the Ural. In the North its range extends to Denmark and Southern Sweden and Finland. It is not present in most of the southern part of the Iberian Peninsula (with the exception of Gibraltar), Sicily and the southern Greek islands. In Morocco it is found in the Atlas mountains. Furthermore, it is also present in North Turkey, the Caucasus and the Crimea. Eastwards, its range stretches through southern Siberia, the northern central Asian mountains up to Mongolia. These moths preferably inhabit sandy terrain, such as sand dunes dry-warm environment, grasslands and heath, at an elevation up to 1,000 metres (3,300 ft) above sea level.

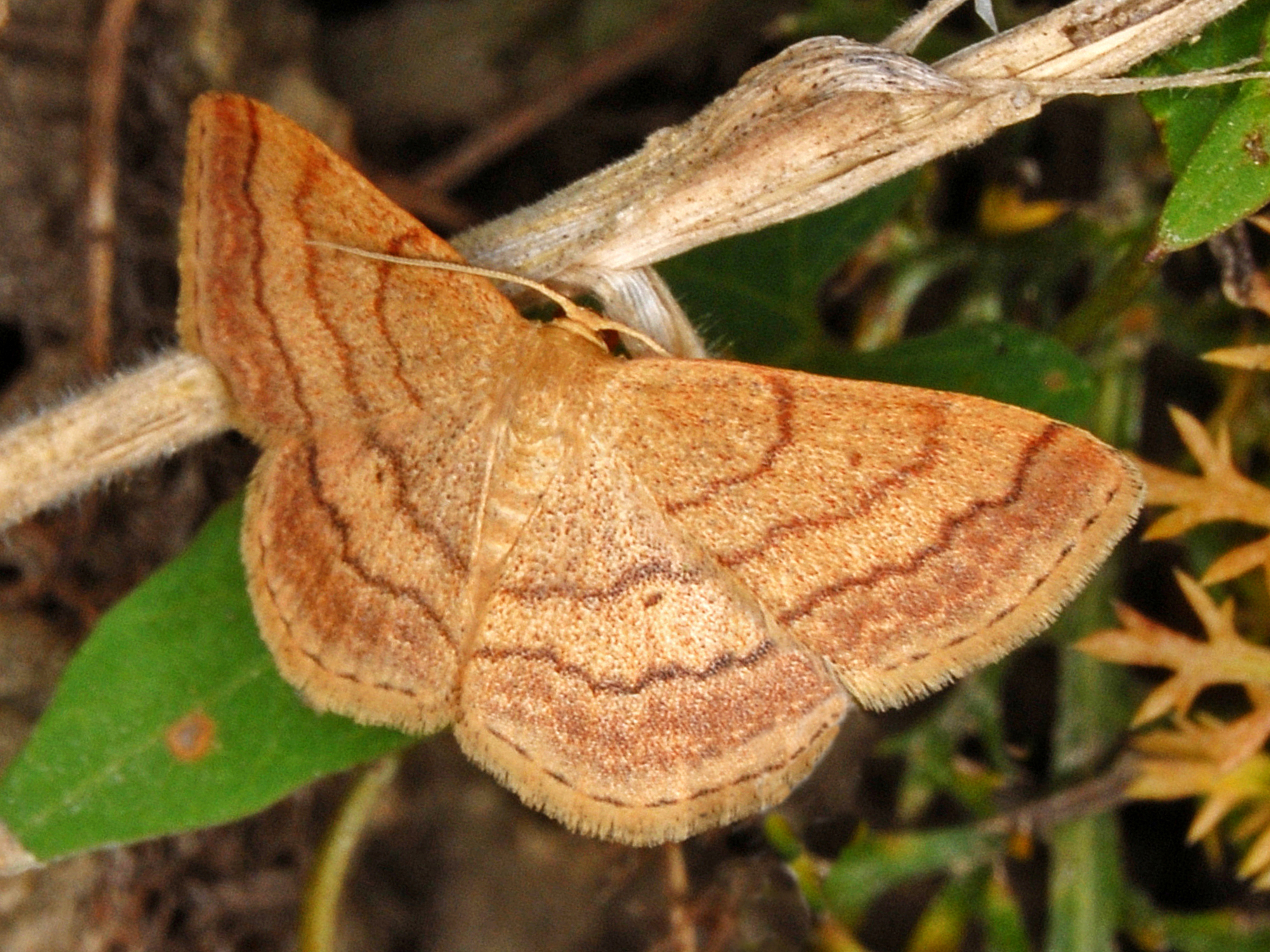
A live specimen of Scopula rubiginata

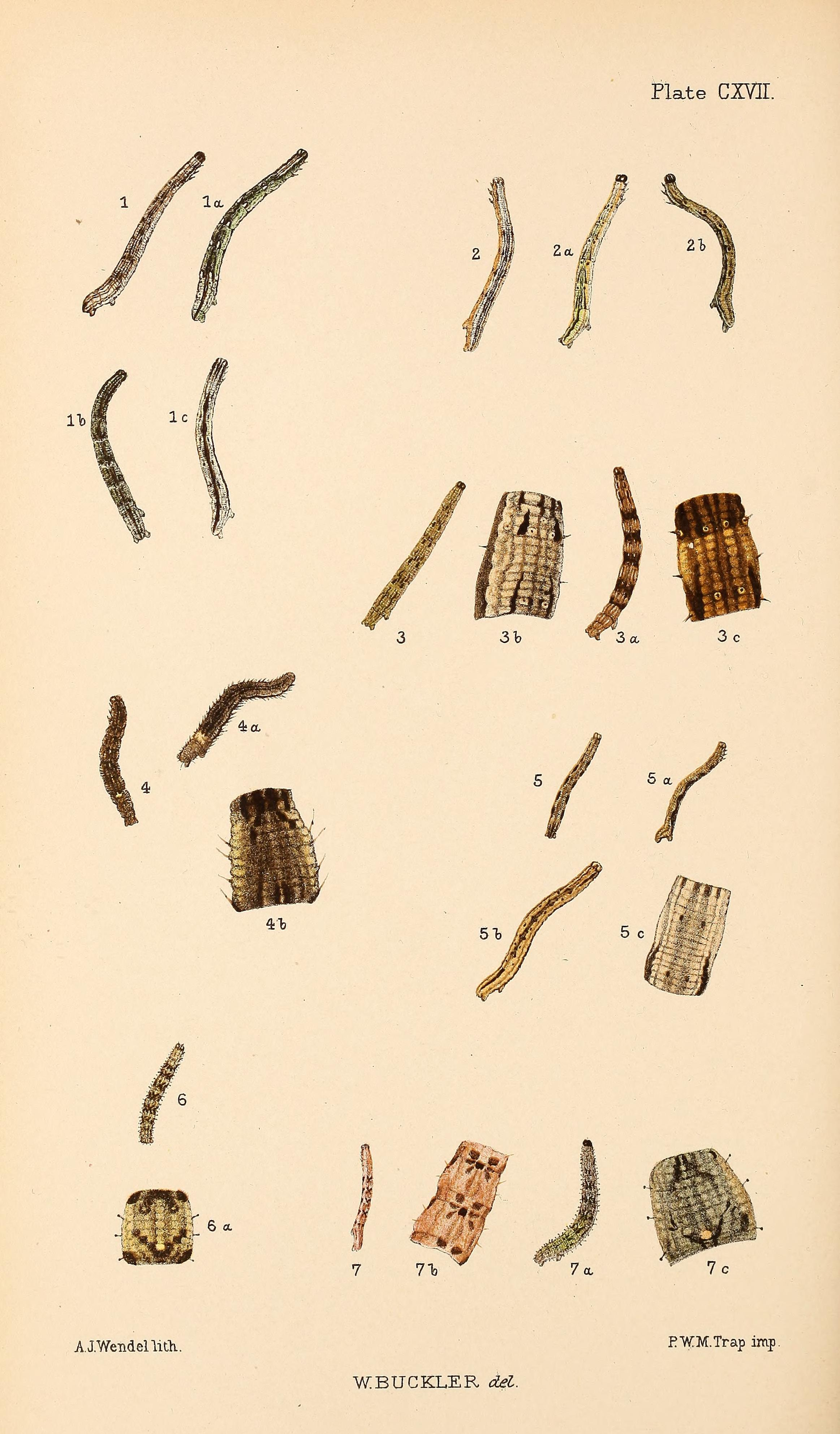
Fig 1,1a,1b,1c Larvae after final moult

== Description ==
Scopula rubiginata has a wingspan of 16–22 mm. These moths are rather small in size in comparison to other geometrids. They present a rather high variability in basic color and drawings. The basic color depends on the humidity. As a matter of fact wings may be tawny, pale brown, violet-reddish, greyish or straw-coloured, with darker brown or darker reddish, transverse and slightly wavy markings (hence the common name of the species) on the upper sides. The inner transverse line is missing on the hind wings. Similar markings are present on the under sides. The apex of the forewings is rounded. The hindwing margin is uniform, almost round. The fringes are paler than the basic color.

The eggs are approximately cylindrical. The surface is covered with 16 distinct longitudinal ribs. The caterpillars are relatively slender and a bit thicker towards the rear end. The color is variable, ranging from yellowish, brownish, slightly reddish to gray. The ventral side is greenish. The back shows a relatively thin line, but darker than the basic color, The head is relatively small, roundish and slightly reddish. The pupa is brown, with fine bristles.

This species is quite similar to Idaea ochrata, but this last species shows a dented hindwing margin.

== Biology ==
The moths fly in one (June to August), two (May to June and July to September) or three (in overlapping generations from April to October) generations depending on the location. These moths are day and night active, but especially from dusk onwards. At night, they come to artificial light sources. The moths were observed on the flowers of the following plants: figworts (Scrophularia canina), small rattle-pail (Rhinanthus minor), yellow mignonette (Reseda lutea), hoary ragwort (Senecio erucifolius), broad-leaved thyme (Thymus pulegioides), alfalfa (Medicago sativa) and carrot (Daucus carota).

The larva feeds on various herbaceous plants, including knotgrass (Polygonum), Thymus glabrescens, Calluna vulgaris, Artemisia campestris, Rumex acetosella, Thymus serpyllum, Medicago lupulina, Vicia, Lotus, Trifolium, Cytisus scoparius, Thalictrum, Galium, Taraxacum officinale and Convolvulus arvensis. The partly grown larvae hibernate in the sward. Later they pupate in a cocoon amongst debris.
