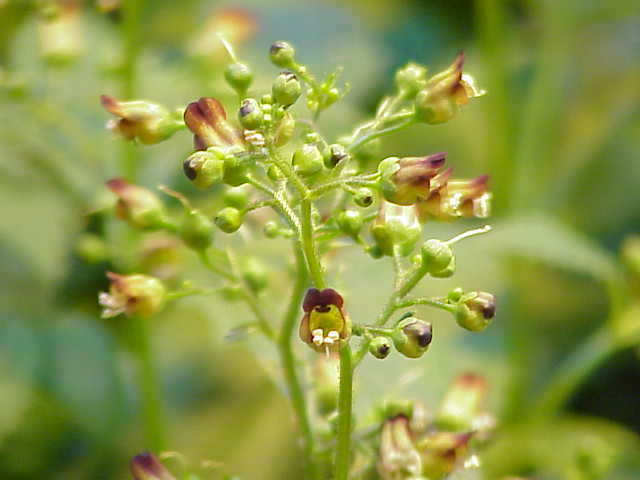
- Scrophularia nodosa

Scientific classification
- Kingdom: Plantae
- Clade: Tracheophytes
- Clade: Angiosperms
- Clade: Eudicots
- Clade: Asterids
- Order: Lamiales
- Family: Scrophulariaceae
- Tribe: Scrophularieae
- Genus: Scrophularia; L.

Species
- 289, see List

Synonyms
- List: Ceramanthe (Rchb.) Dumort.; Mosheovia Eig; Oreosolen Hook.f.; Scrophucephalus A.P.Khokhr.; Tomiephyllum Fourr.; Tuerckheimocharis Urb.; Venilia Fourr.

= Scrophularia =

Genus of flowering plants

The genus Scrophularia of the family Scrophulariaceae comprises about 200 species of herbaceous flowering plants commonly known as figworts. Species of Scrophularia all share square stems, opposite leaves and open two-lipped flowers forming clusters at the end of their stems. The genus is found throughout the Northern Hemisphere.

Scrophularia species are used as food plants by the larvae of some Lepidoptera species including Phymatopus hectoides.

Some species in this genus are known to contain potentially useful substances, such as iridoids, and several Scrophularia species, such as the Ningpo figwort (S. ningpoensis), have been used by herbal medicine practitioners around the world. The name Scrophularia comes from scrofula, a form of tuberculosis, because several species have been used in herbal medicine for this disease.

== Selected species ==
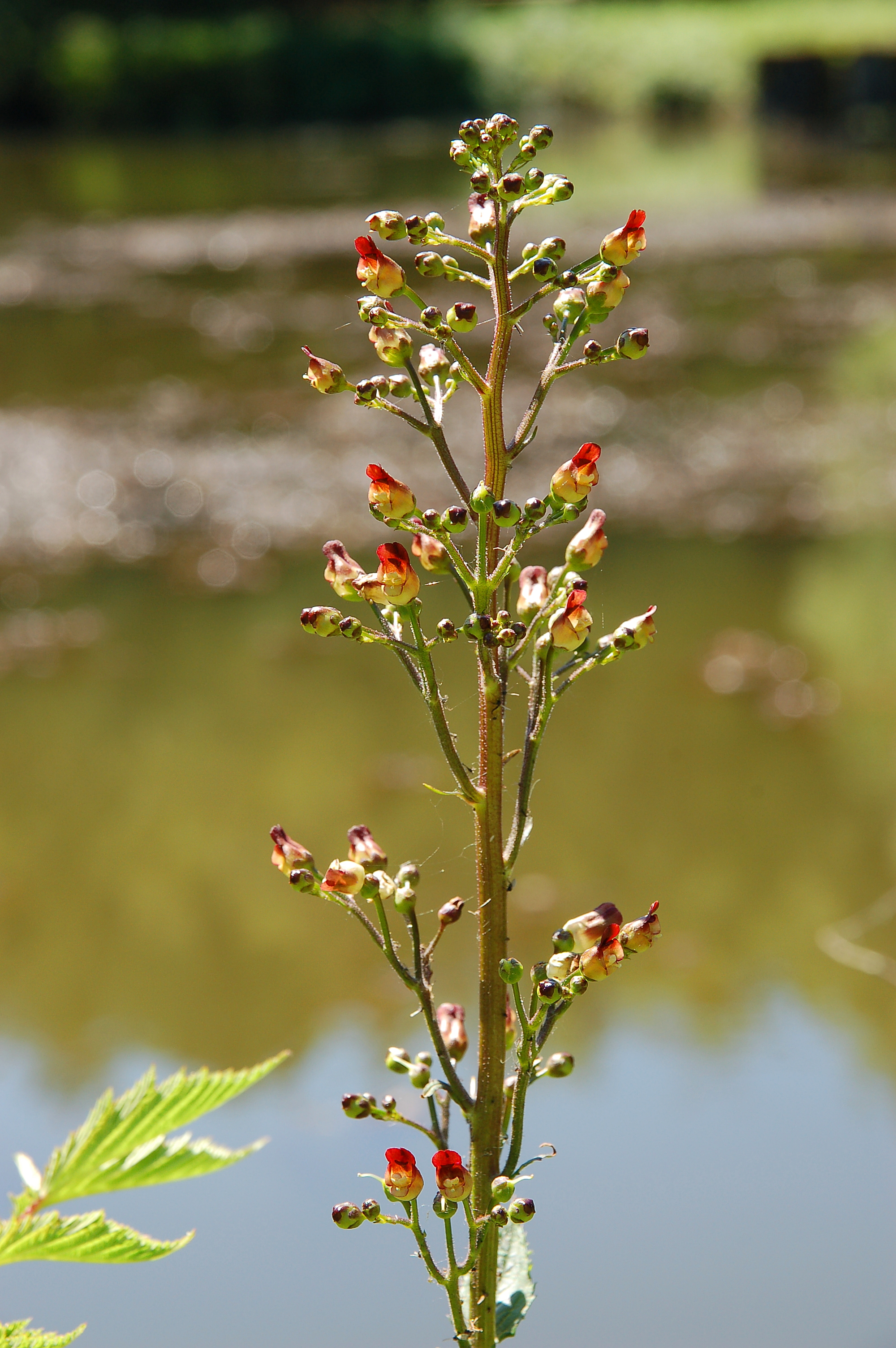
Common figwort (Scrophularia nodosa)

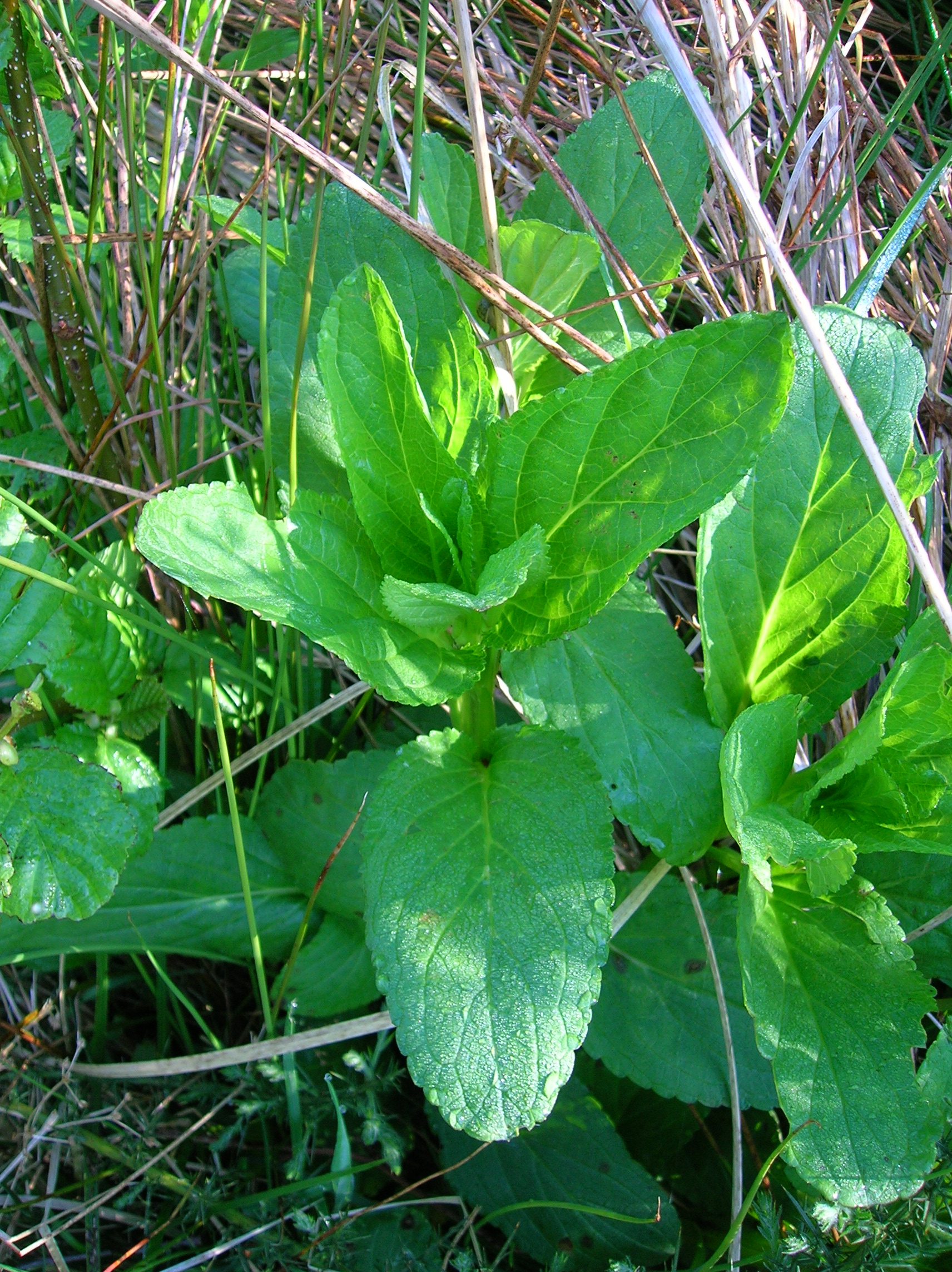
Green figwort (Scrophularia umbrosa)

- Scrophularia atrata – black figwort
- Scrophularia auriculata – water figwort
- Scrophularia californica – California figwort
- Scrophularia canina – dog figwort
- Scrophularia desertorum – desert figwort
- Scrophularia grandiflora
- Scrophularia laevis – smooth figwort
- Scrophularia lanceolata – lanceleaf figwort
- Scrophularia macrantha – Mimbres figwort
- Scrophularia marilandica – late figwort
- Scrophularia ningpoensis – Ningpo figwort
- Scrophularia nodosa – common figwort
- Scrophularia oblongifolia – green figwort
- Scrophularia parviflora – pineland figwort
- Scrophularia peregrina – nettle-leaved figwort
- Scrophularia sambucifolia
- Scrophularia scorodonia – balm-leaved figwort
- Scrophularia vernalis – yellow figwort
- Scrophularia villosa
