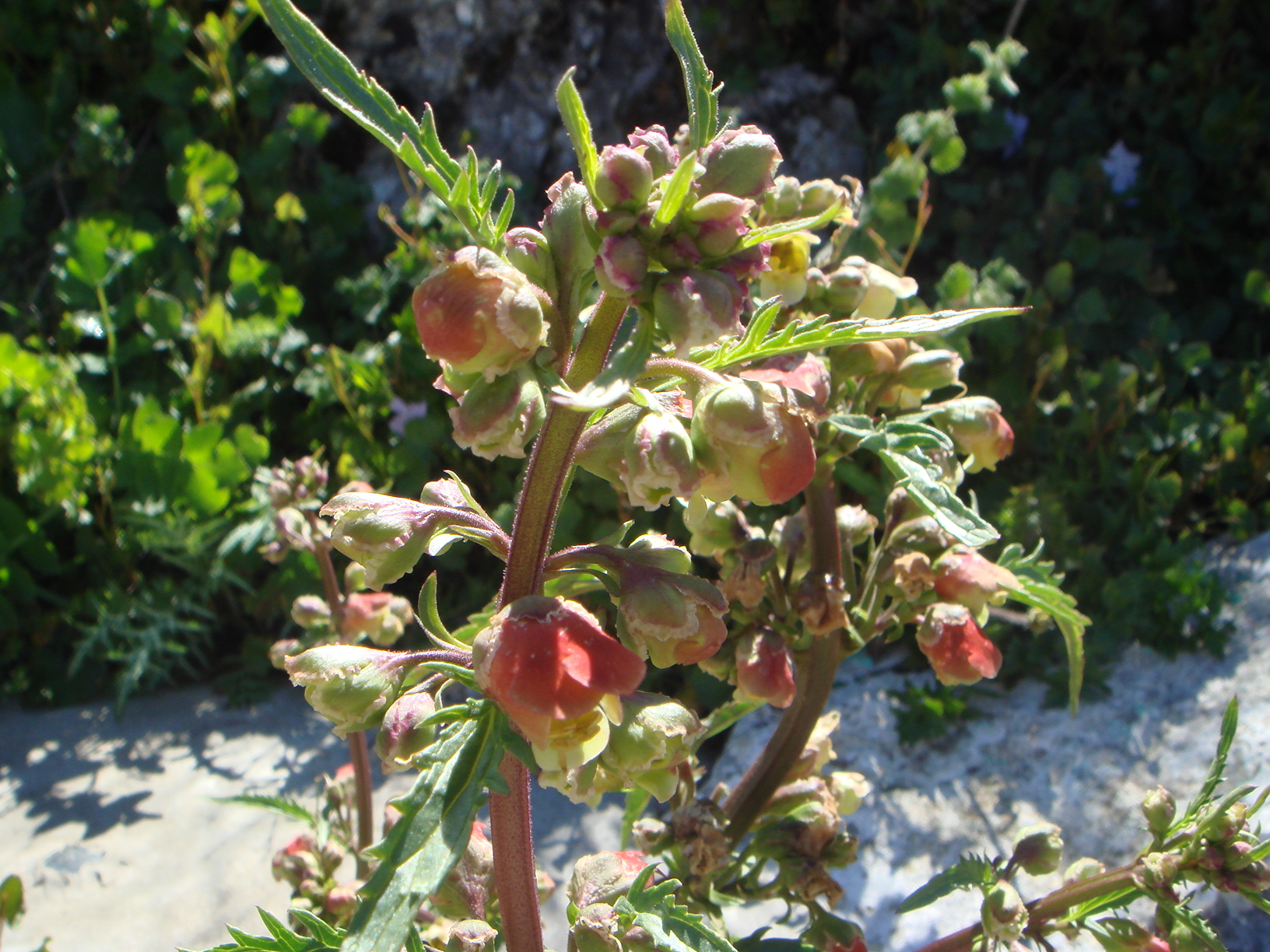

Scientific classification
- Kingdom: Plantae
- Clade: Tracheophytes
- Clade: Angiosperms
- Clade: Eudicots
- Clade: Asterids
- Order: Lamiales
- Family: Scrophulariaceae
- Genus: Scrophularia
- Species: S. sambucifolia

Binomial name
- Scrophularia sambucifolia L.

Synonyms
- Scrophularia sambucifolia viridiflora (Poir.) Maire; Scrophularia viridiflora Poir.; Scrophularia mellifera Aiton; Scrophularia sambucifolia subvar. rubriflora Maire; Scrophularia decora Fisch., C. A. Mey. & Avé-Lall.; Scrophularia trisecta Pau; Scrophularia sambucifolia vidalii Pau

= Scrophularia sambucifolia =

Species of flowering plant

Scrophularia sambucifolia is a species of flowering plant in the figwort family (Scrophulariaceae) native to the Iberian Peninsula and Northwest Africa.

== Description ==
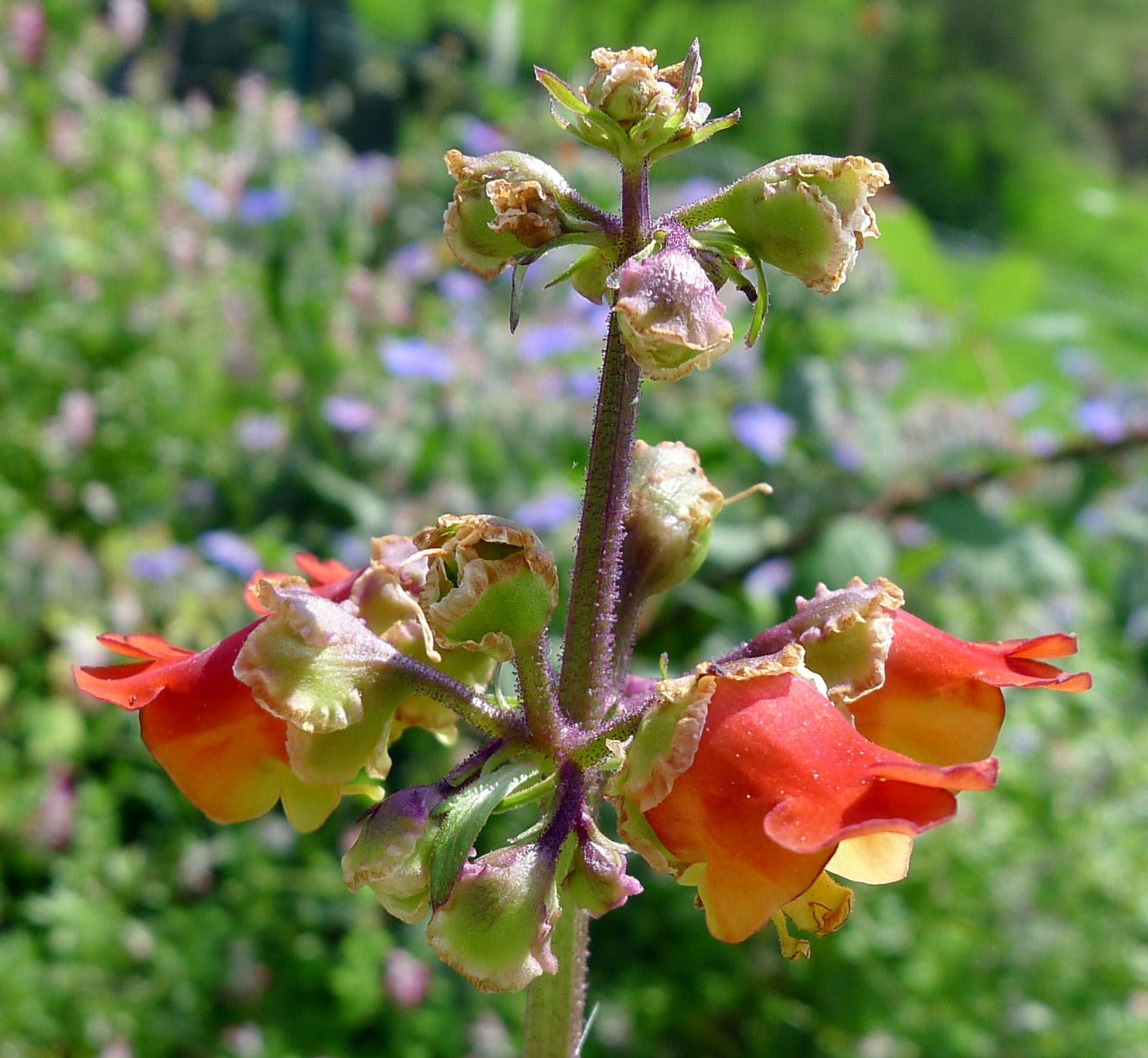
Part of the inflorescence

Scrophularia sambucifolia is a perennial rhizomatous glabrous herb with stems up to 1.90 m (6.2 ft) tall with little or no ramification. Inflorescence is usually 15–50 cm (5.9–19.7 in) long with 1 to 10 opposed flowers. Flower crown is orange-reddish, orange-purple or greenish-yellow with orange spots, upper lip is reddish purple. Anthers are yellow, sometimes with bluish margins. Staminode is purple, sometimes greenish-purple.

== Distribution and habitat ==
Scrophularia sambucifolia is native to the southwest Iberian Peninsula (in central and southern Portugal, mainly Médio Tejo, Lezíria do Tejo, Baixo Alentejo and Algarve, southwest Spain and Gibraltar) and Northwest Africa (in Morocco, Algeria and Tunisia) where it inhabits moist sites, usually close to the margins of water lines, preferably on deep soils of mud or limestone origin.

== Subspecies ==
There are two known subspecies:

- S. sambucifolia subsp. sambucifolia: Endemic to southwest Iberia and Morocco.
- S. sambucifolia subsp. mellifera(Aiton): Endemic to southwest Spain, Morocco, Algeria and Tunisia.
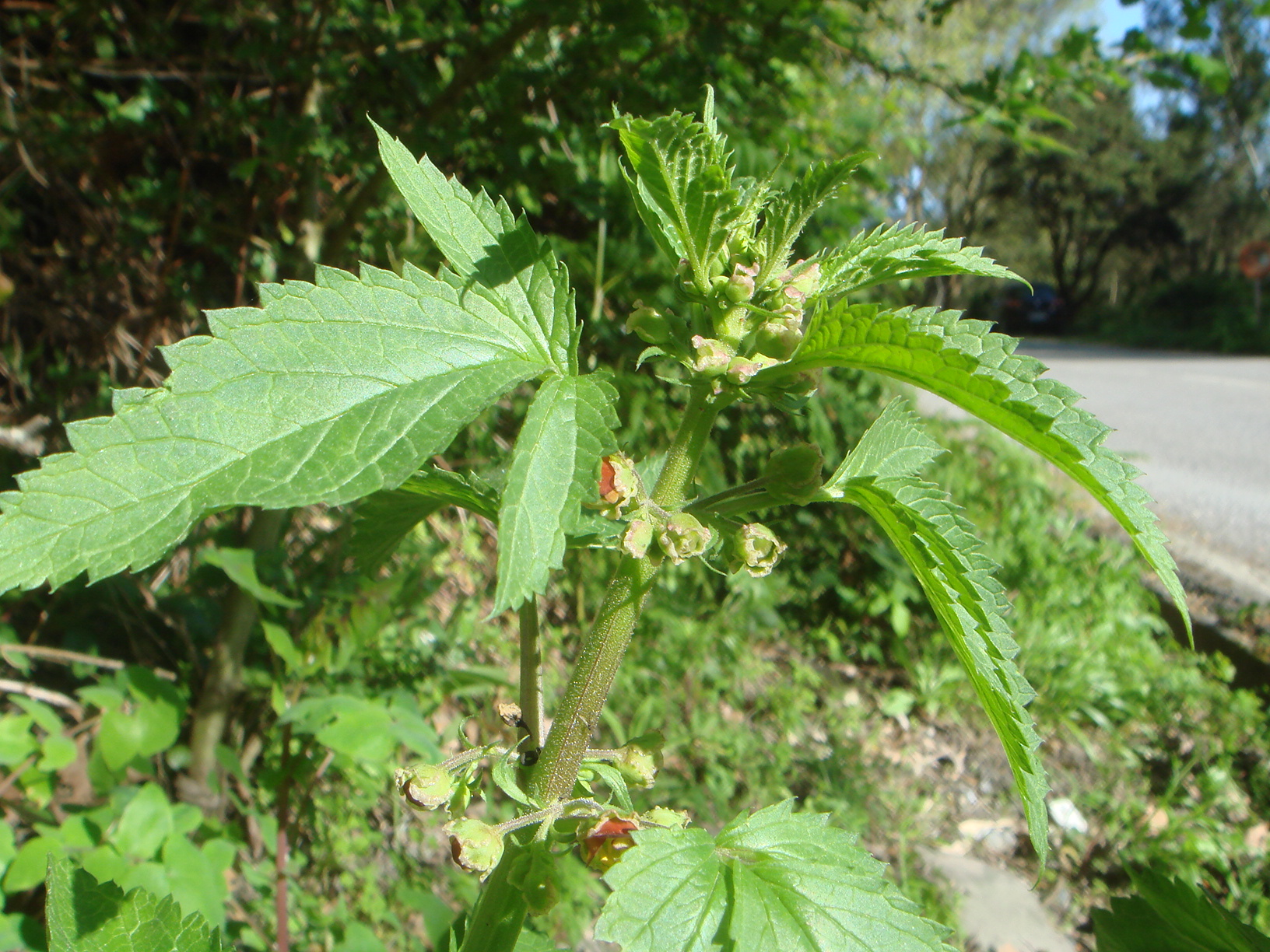

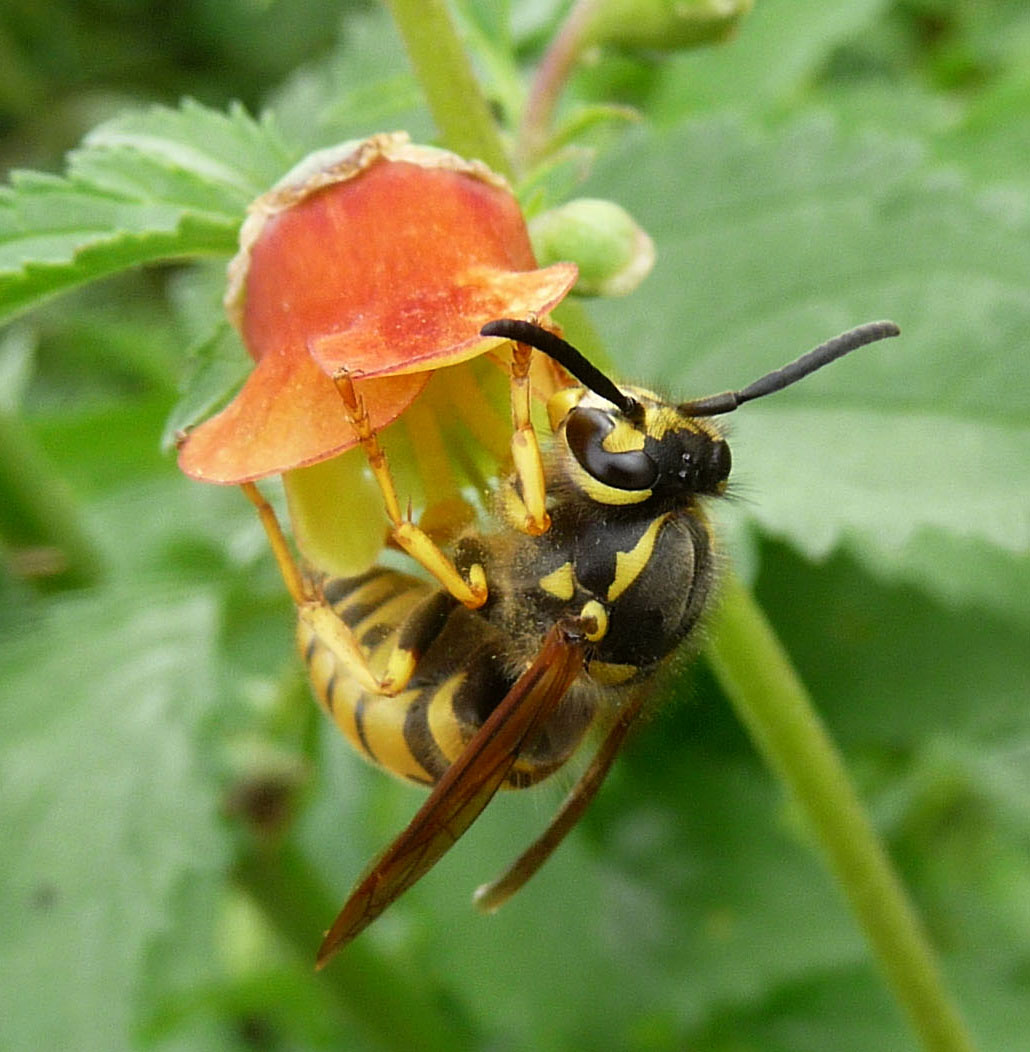

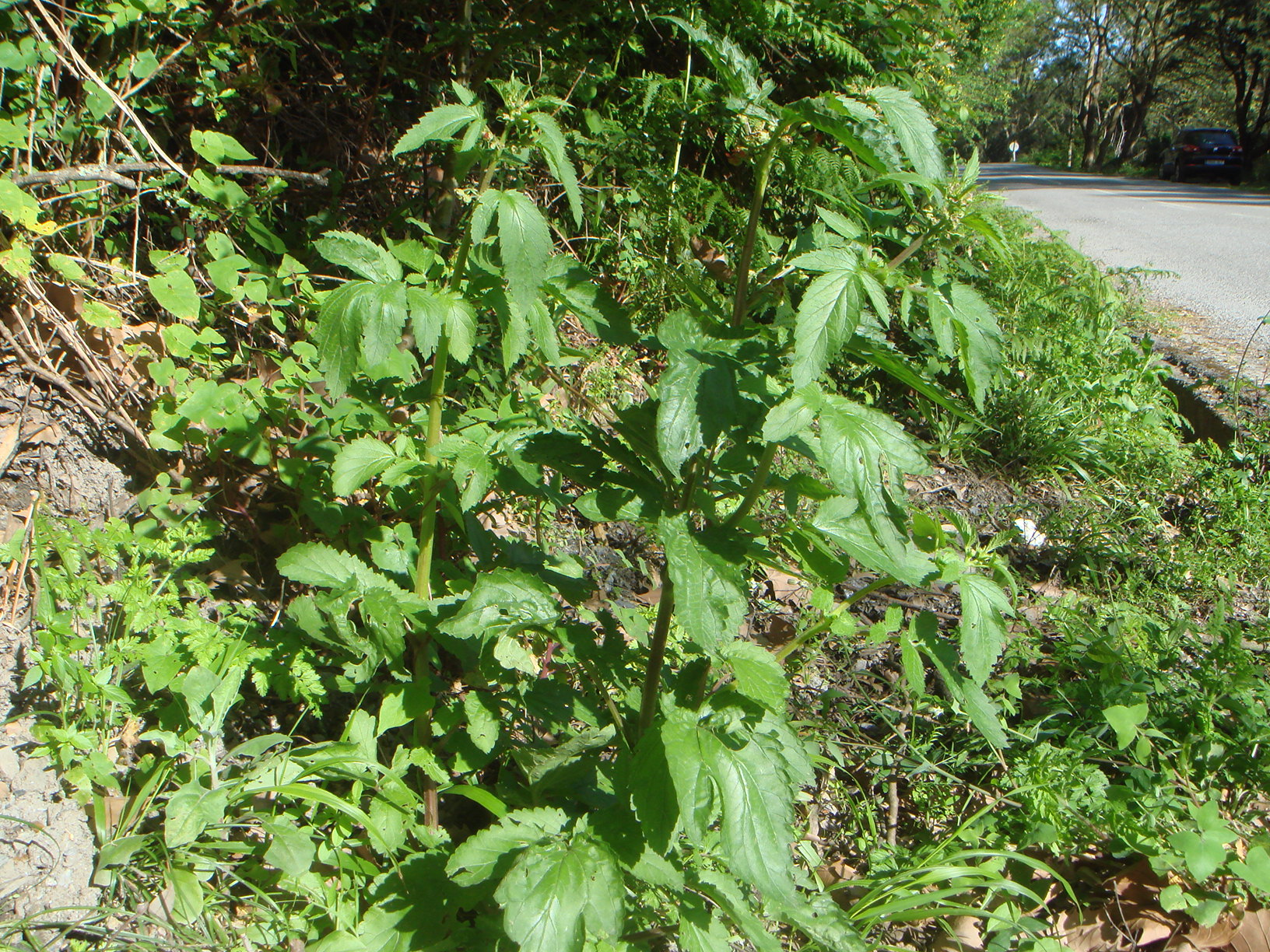

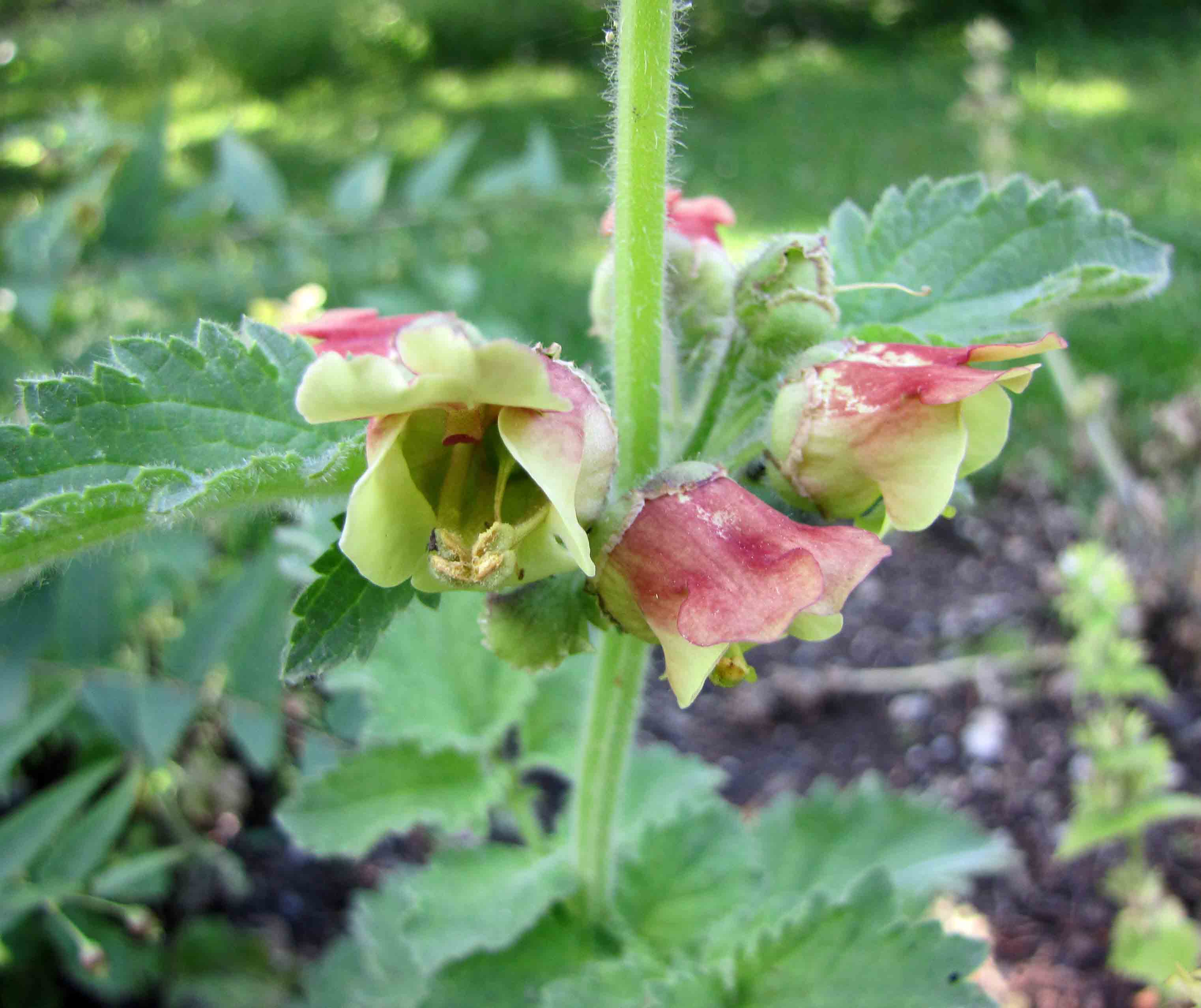
