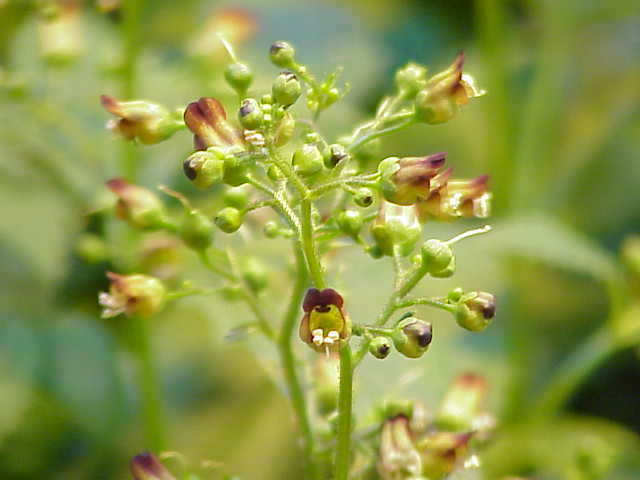

Scientific classification
- Kingdom: Plantae
- Clade: Tracheophytes
- Clade: Angiosperms
- Clade: Eudicots
- Clade: Asterids
- Order: Lamiales
- Family: Scrophulariaceae
- Genus: Scrophularia
- Species: S. nodosa

Binomial name
- Scrophularia nodosa L.

= Scrophularia nodosa =

Species of flowering plant

Scrophularia nodosa (also called figwort, woodland figwort, and common figwort) is a perennial herbaceous plant found in temperate regions of the Northern Hemisphere except western North America. It grows in moist and cultivated waste ground.

== Growth ==
It grows upright, with thick, sharply square, succulent stems up to 150 cm tall from a horizontal rootstock. Its leaves are opposite, ovate at the base and lanceolate at the tip, all having toothed margins. The flowers are in loose cymes in oblong or pyramidal panicles. The individual flowers are globular, with five green sepals encircling green or purple petals, giving way to an egg-shaped seed capsule.

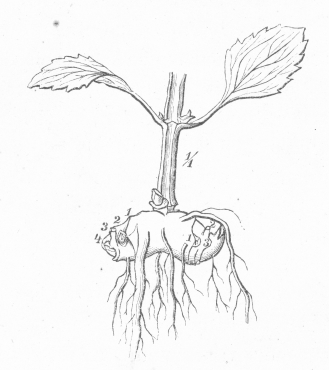
First year Scrophularia nodosa plant: swollen hypocotyl/stem with scars from the first four pairs of leaves (1-4). From (Warming 1884)

== Fossil record ==
Seed identification of Scrophularia nodosa has been made from sub-stage IIIa of the Hoxnian at Clacton in Essex, from the Middle Pleistocene.

== Folklore ==
The plant was thought, by the doctrine of signatures, to be able to cure the throat disease scrofula because of the throat-like shape of its flowers.
