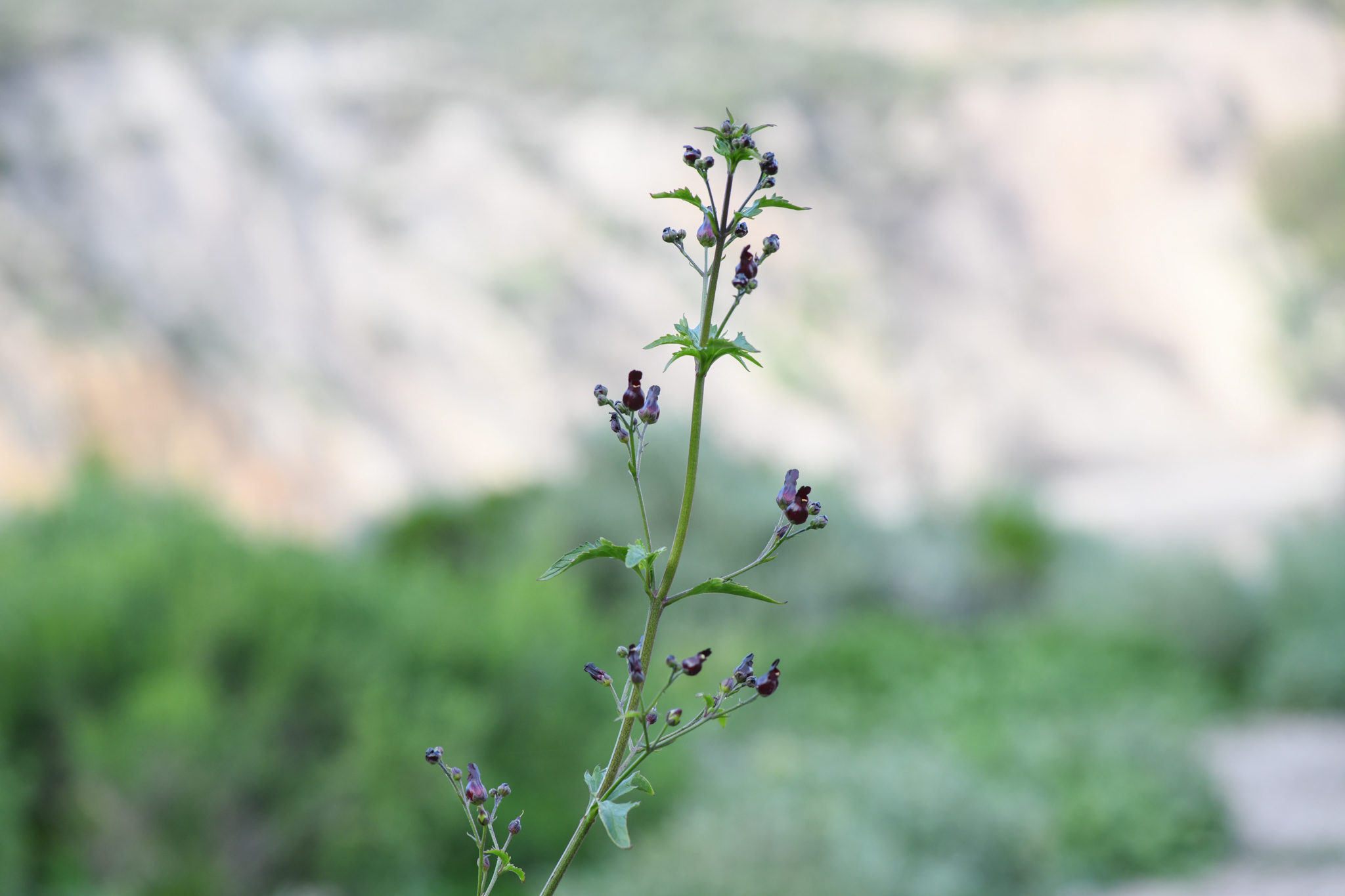
- San Luis Obispo County, California, 2023

Conservation status
- Imperiled (NatureServe)

Scientific classification
- Kingdom: Plantae
- Clade: Tracheophytes
- Clade: Angiosperms
- Clade: Eudicots
- Clade: Asterids
- Order: Lamiales
- Family: Scrophulariaceae
- Genus: Scrophularia
- Species: S. atrata

Binomial name
- Scrophularia atrata Pennell

= Scrophularia atrata =

Species of flowering plant

Scrophularia atrata is an uncommon species of flowering plant in the figwort family known by the common names black-flowered figwort and darkflowered figwort. It is endemic to California, where it is known only from a section of the Central Coast Ranges in San Luis Obispo and Santa Barbara Counties. It grows in the calcareous and diatomaceous soils of the coastal canyons at elevations not exceeding 500 meters. There have been 128 observed occurrences of this species on Calflora.org alone. According to NatureServe, 38 out of 62 occurrences are historic. This plant is a perennial herb producing an erect, four-sided stem up to a meter tall or slightly taller. It is somewhat hairy to densely woolly in texture. The leaves have toothed oval blades up to 10 centimeters long which are borne on long petioles. The inflorescence is a wide-open panicle with several hairy, glandular branches bearing flowers. The flower has an urn-shaped corolla with a rounded body and an open mouth at the top which is edged with hoodlike lobes. The corolla is deep, dark red to nearly black in color. The fruit is a capsule just under a centimeter long containing many seeds.
