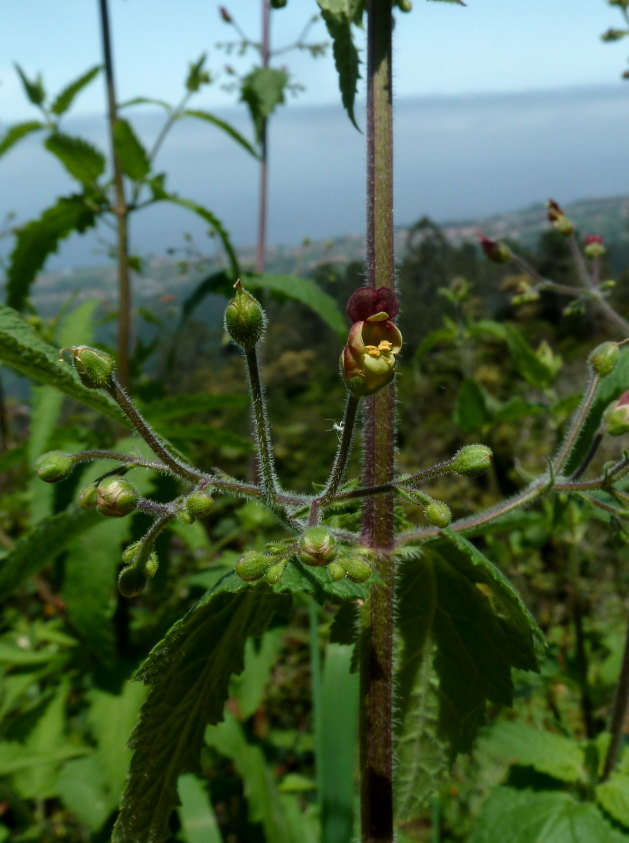

Scientific classification
- Kingdom: Plantae
- Clade: Tracheophytes
- Clade: Angiosperms
- Clade: Eudicots
- Clade: Asterids
- Order: Lamiales
- Family: Scrophulariaceae
- Genus: Scrophularia
- Species: S. scorodonia

Binomial name
- Scrophularia scorodonia L.

= Scrophularia scorodonia =

Species of flowering plant

Scrophularia scorodonia is a species of flowering plant in the figwort family (Scrophulariaceae).

It is native to western and southwestern Europe, Northwest Morocco and the Azores and Madeira islands.
