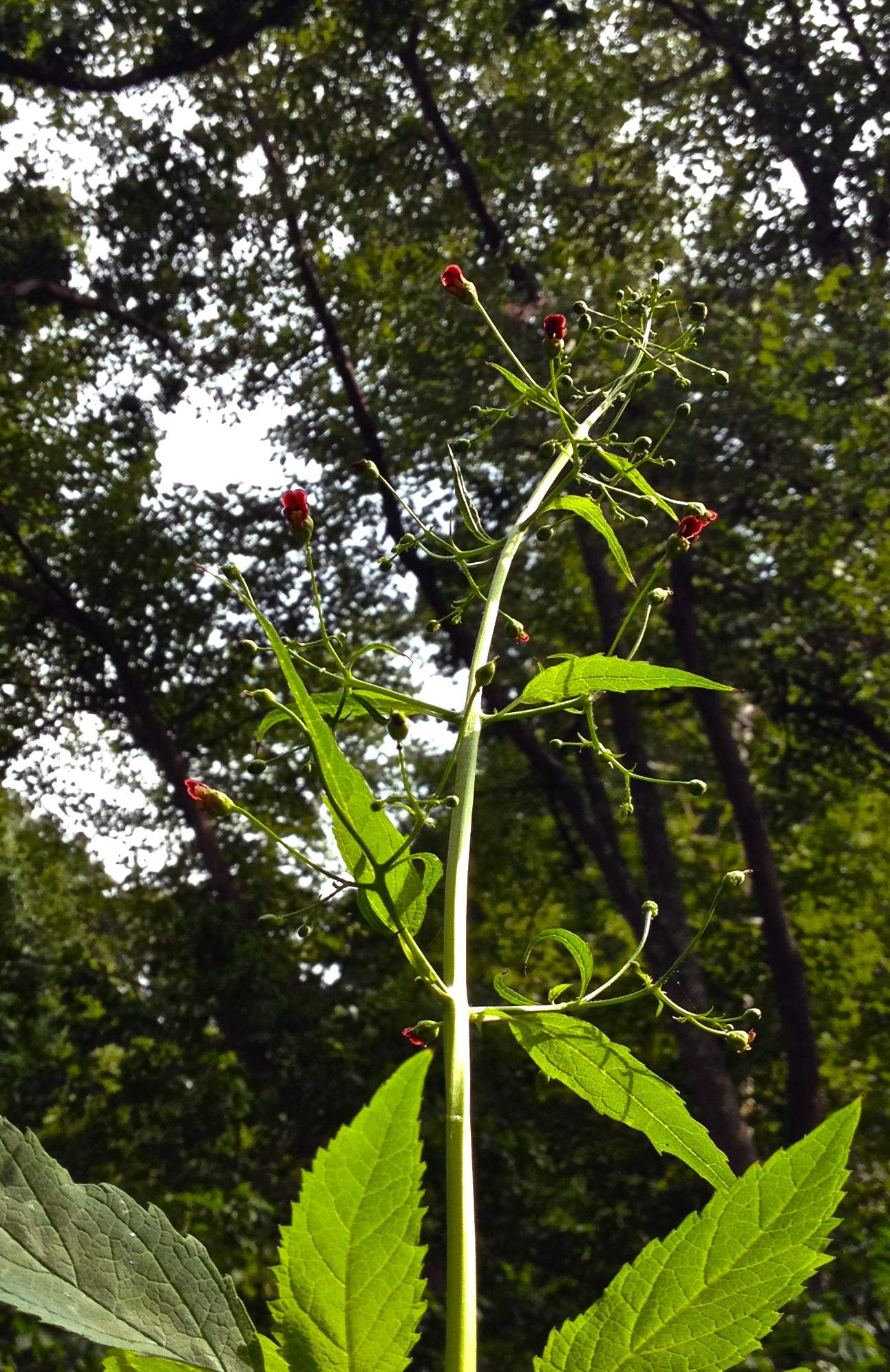

Conservation status
- Secure (NatureServe)

Scientific classification
- Kingdom: Plantae
- Clade: Tracheophytes
- Clade: Angiosperms
- Clade: Eudicots
- Clade: Asterids
- Order: Lamiales
- Family: Scrophulariaceae
- Genus: Scrophularia
- Species: S. marilandica

Binomial name
- Scrophularia marilandica L.

= Scrophularia marilandica =

Species of flowering plant

Scrophularia marilandica, also called late figwort, Maryland figwort, carpenter's square, or eastern figwort, is a flowering plant in the family Scrophulariaceae, native throughout eastern and central North America, where it is found growing in dry woods from Manitoba and Quebec south to Texas and Florida.

It grows 1.5–3 metres (4 ft 11 in – 9 ft 10 in) tall, with opposite, ovate leaves up to 15 centimetres (5.9 in) long and 9 centimetres (3.5 in) broad. The flowers are rounded, 8–9 millimetres (0.31–0.35 in) long, with a cup-like mouth that look somewhat like a horse's mouth with a bad overbite; they are a deep reddish-purple color on the inside, with a greenish to almost brown cast on the outside. They are commonly visited by hummingbirds in late summer.

Past common names for Scrophularia marilandica have included heal-all, pilewort, and scrofula-plant. It was once used as an herbal remedy for hemorrhoids. During the 19th century, the root extract was used to treat insomnia and anxiety.
