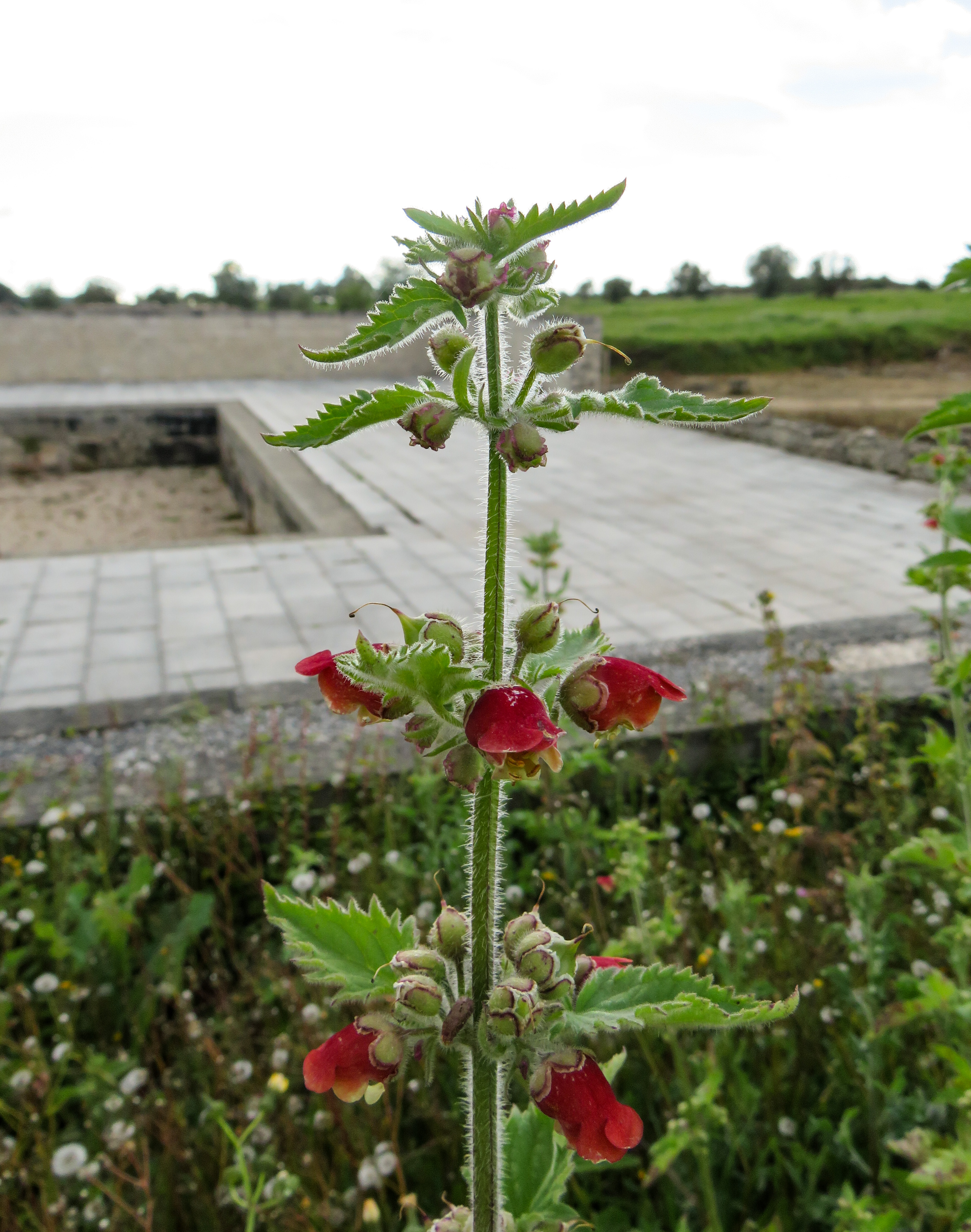

Conservation status
- Least Concern (IUCN 3.1)

Scientific classification
- Kingdom: Plantae
- Clade: Tracheophytes
- Clade: Angiosperms
- Clade: Eudicots
- Clade: Asterids
- Order: Lamiales
- Family: Scrophulariaceae
- Genus: Scrophularia
- Species: S. grandiflora

Binomial name
- Scrophularia grandiflora DC.

= Scrophularia grandiflora =

Species of plant

Scrophularia grandiflora is a species of flowering plant in the figwort family (Scrophulariaceae) endemic to Portugal.

== Description ==
Scrophularia grandiflora is a perennial rhizomatous pubescent herb with stems up to 1.80 m (5.9 ft) tall, ramified at the base. pinnatisect leaves. Inflorescence is usually 24–110 cm (9.4–43.3 in) long with a group of 10 flowers at the base and the rest around 2-6 flowers, opposed, occasionally alternate. Petals are pinkish-flesh, upper lip is purple pink. Anthers are yellow, sometimes with bluish margins. Staminode is purple. Seed capsule is ovoid, very hard when mature and is brown or greenish brown. Seeds are brown-blackish.

== Distribution and habitat ==
Scrophularia grandiflora is endemic to central west Portugal, mainly in the districts of Coimbra and Leiria, and partially on Santarém and Lisbon where it inhabits slopes and shoulders of paths, empty spaces and forest edges, preferably in shady, humid and somewhat disturbed places. Usually 400–500 m (1,300–1,600 ft) altitude but is also found at much lower sites. Its habitat is focused largely on the area around Coimbra.
