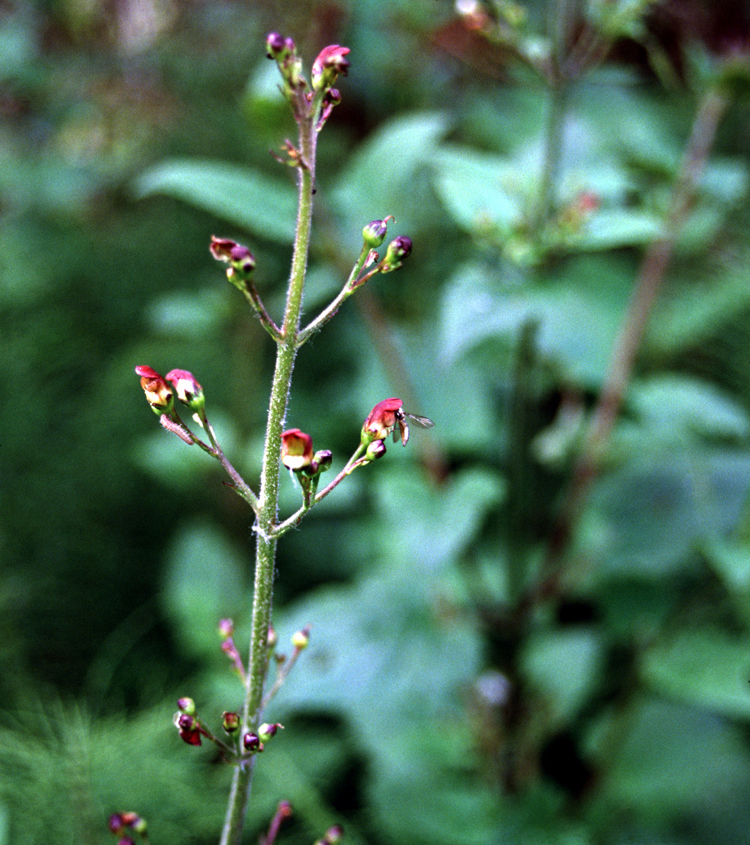

Scientific classification
- Kingdom: Plantae
- Clade: Tracheophytes
- Clade: Angiosperms
- Clade: Eudicots
- Clade: Asterids
- Order: Lamiales
- Family: Scrophulariaceae
- Genus: Scrophularia
- Species: S. californica

Binomial name
- Scrophularia californica Cham. & Schldl.

= Scrophularia californica =

Species of flowering plant

Scrophularia californica is a flowering plant in the figwort family which is known by the common names California figwort and California bee plant.

It is native to the western United States, including many habitats in California, and in British Columbia.

== Description ==
Scrophularia californica is an unassuming plant with triangular, toothed, blue-green leaves in pairs opposite each other on a spindly, squared stem.

The brownish-magenta flowers are rounded, hollow buds about a centimeter long with two long upper lobes.

== Relationships with animals ==
This species is a strong bee attractant and also serves as a host plant for variable checkerspot larvae. While bees cannot see the color red, they are nevertheless able to see the flower, likely due to their ability to see patterns on the flowers visible in UV light. The checkerspot is able to utilize iridoid glycosides in the sap to make its larva poisonous and adults unpalatable to predators.

=== Human uses ===
Native American groups in northern Baja California have used the root of the plant to make a medicinal tea. The Pomo of northwestern California and the Ohlone of the San Francisco Bay Area used it as a poultice for infections and boils.
