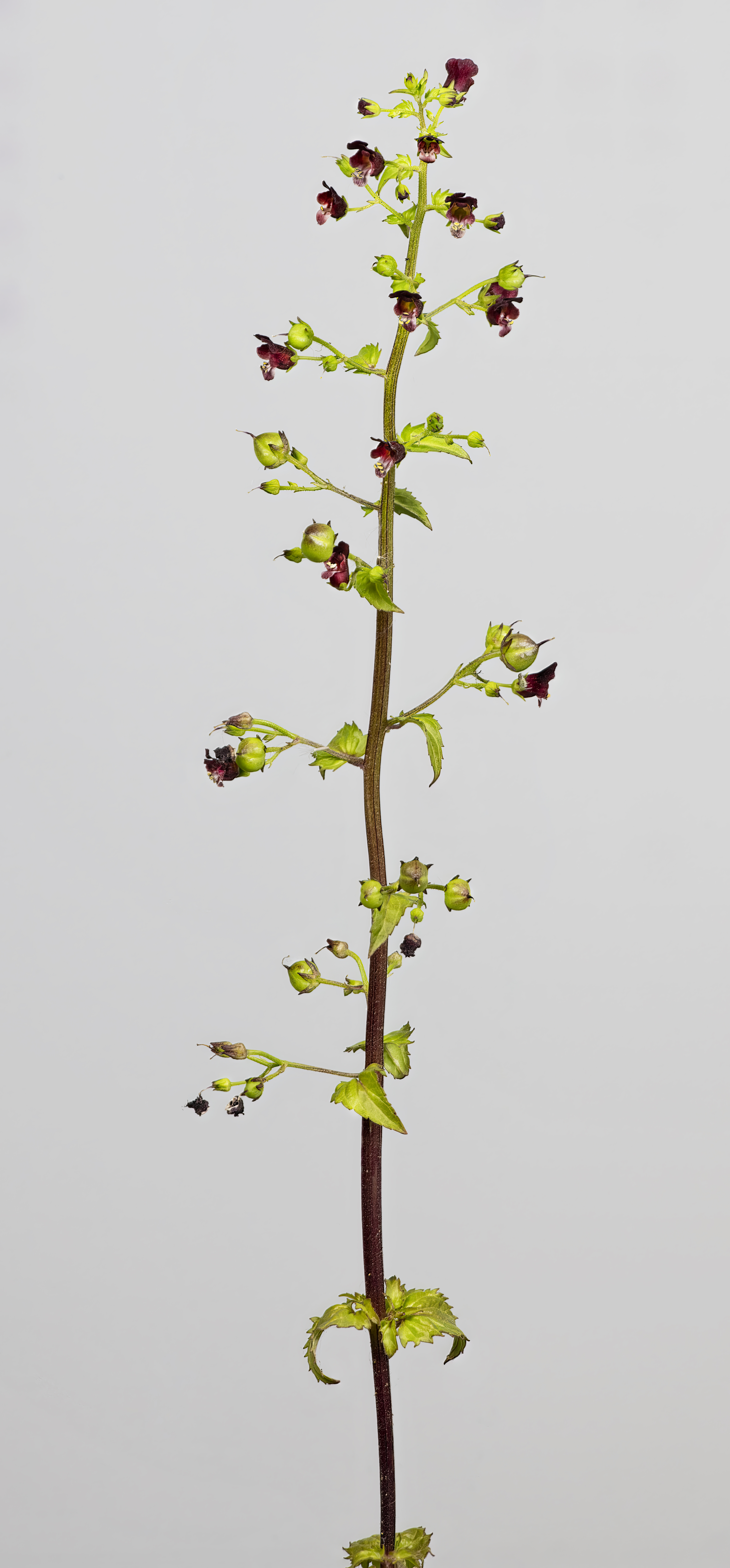

Scientific classification
- Kingdom: Plantae
- Clade: Tracheophytes
- Clade: Angiosperms
- Clade: Eudicots
- Clade: Asterids
- Order: Lamiales
- Family: Scrophulariaceae
- Genus: Scrophularia
- Species: S. peregrina

Binomial name
- Scrophularia peregrina L.

= Scrophularia peregrina =

Species of plant

Scrophularia peregrina, the Mediterranean figwort, is a species of annual herb in the family Scrophulariaceae. They have a self-supporting growth form. Individuals can grow to 0.39 m.

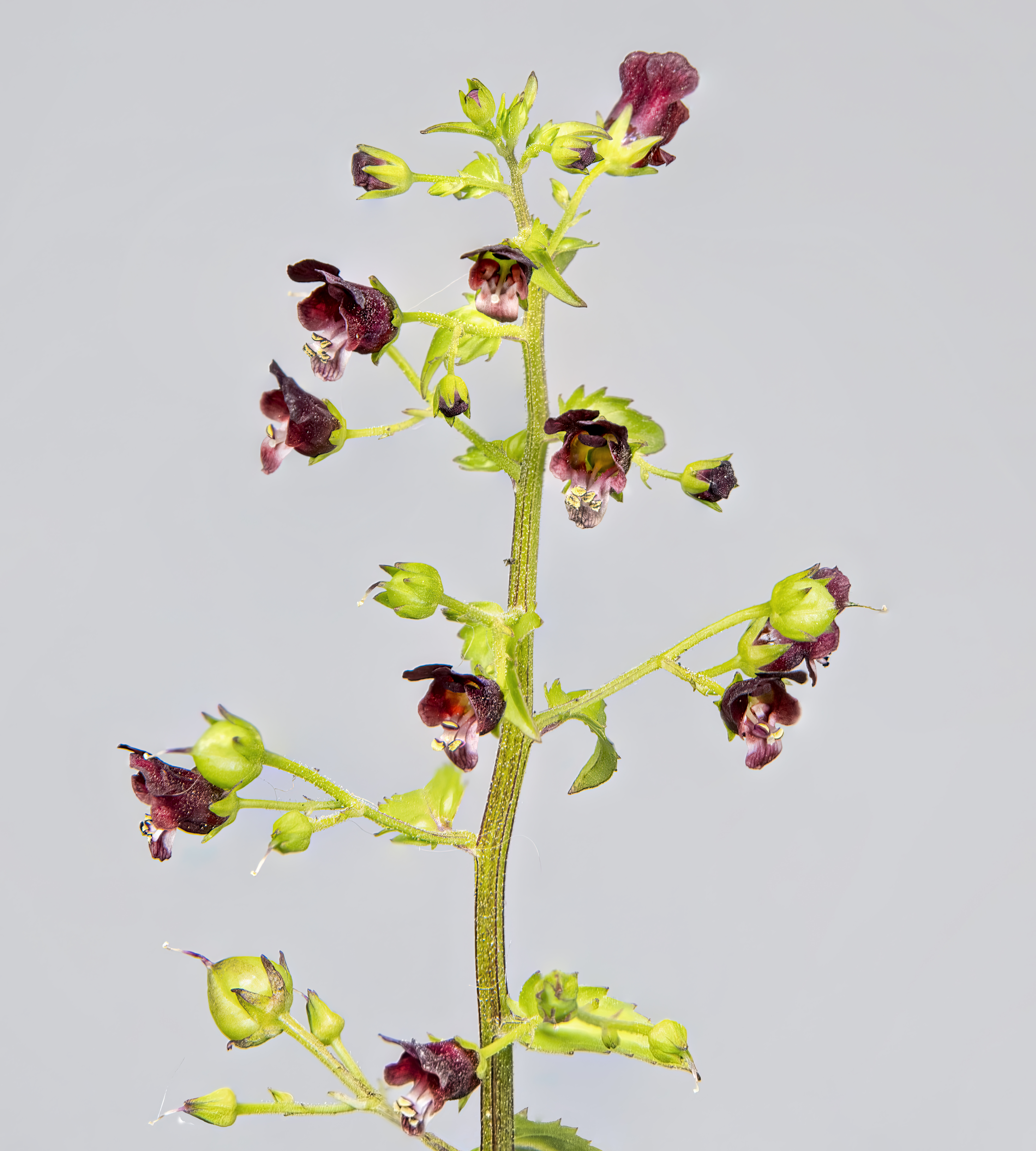
Inflorescence

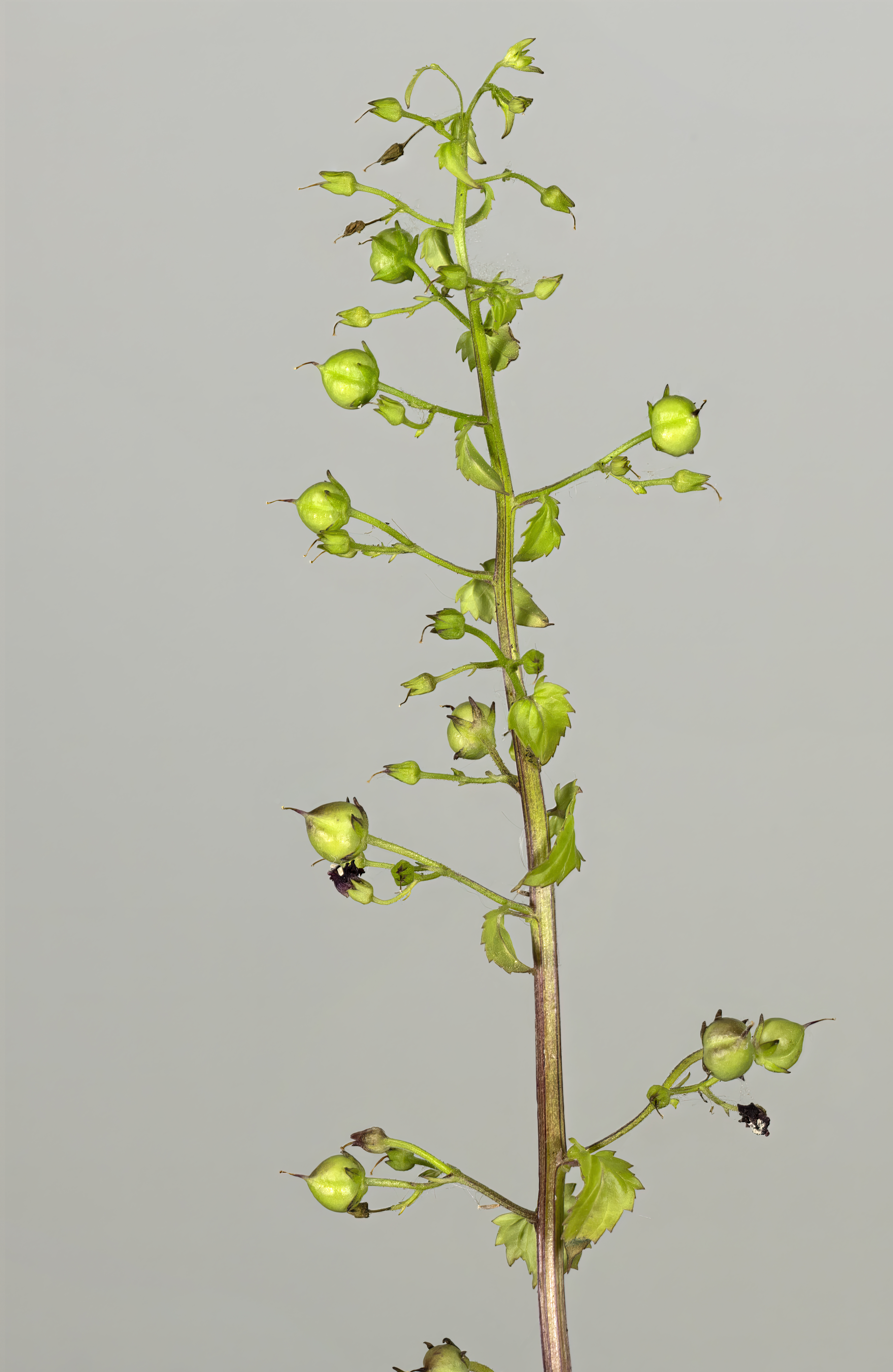
Infrutescence

== Sources ==
This article incorporates text from a free content work. Licensed under CC0 (license statement/permission). Text taken from Scrophularia peregrina. Encyclopedia of Life.
