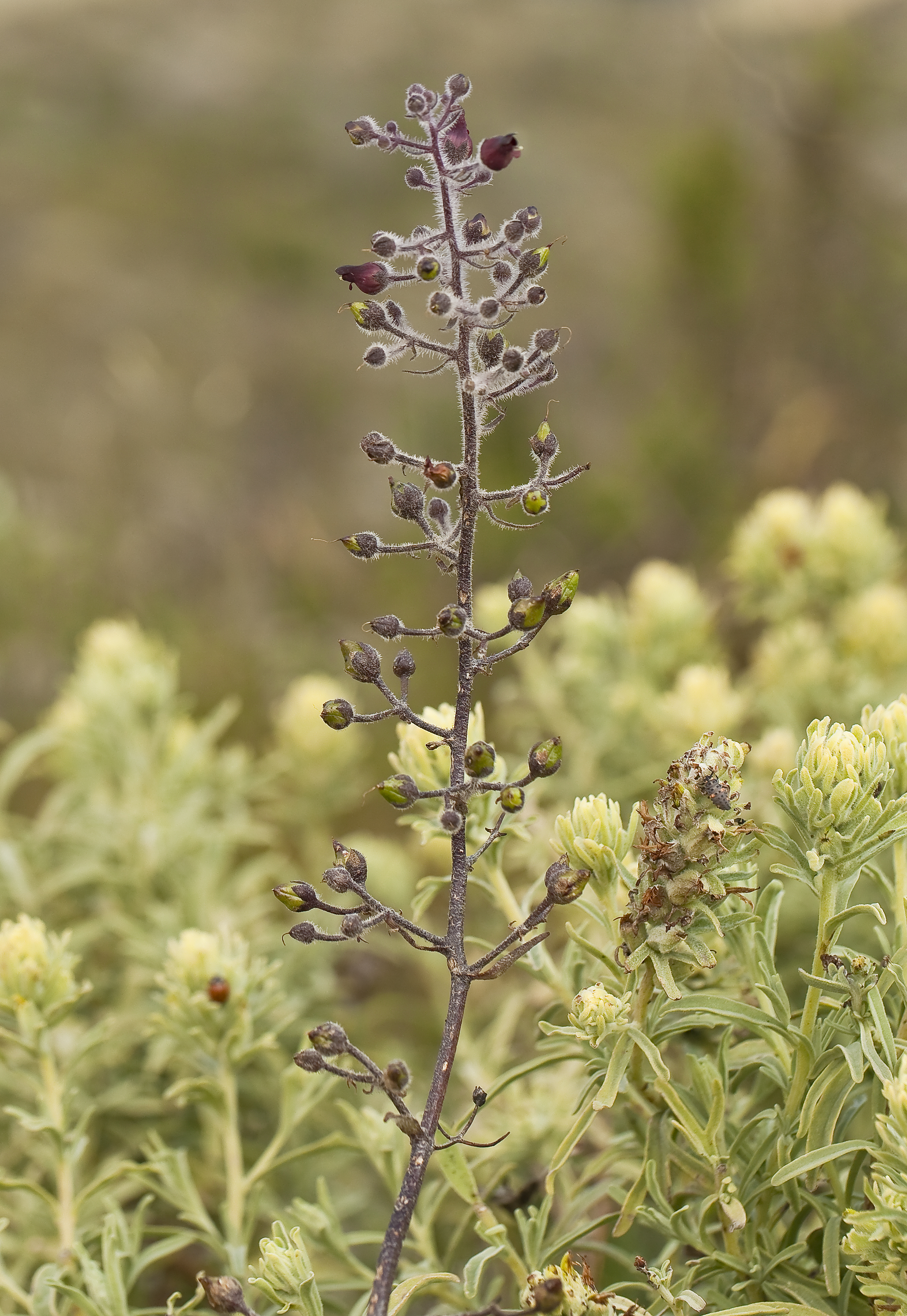

Scientific classification
- Kingdom: Plantae
- Clade: Tracheophytes
- Clade: Angiosperms
- Clade: Eudicots
- Clade: Asterids
- Order: Lamiales
- Family: Scrophulariaceae
- Genus: Scrophularia
- Species: S. villosa

Binomial name
- Scrophularia villosa Pennell

= Scrophularia villosa =

Species of flowering plant

Scrophularia villosa is a species of flowering plant in the figwort family known by the common name Santa Catalina figwort. It is endemic to the Channel Islands of California, where it is known only from Catalina and San Clemente Islands. It grows in coastal sage scrub and chaparral habitat. It is a shrub growing between one and two meters tall.
