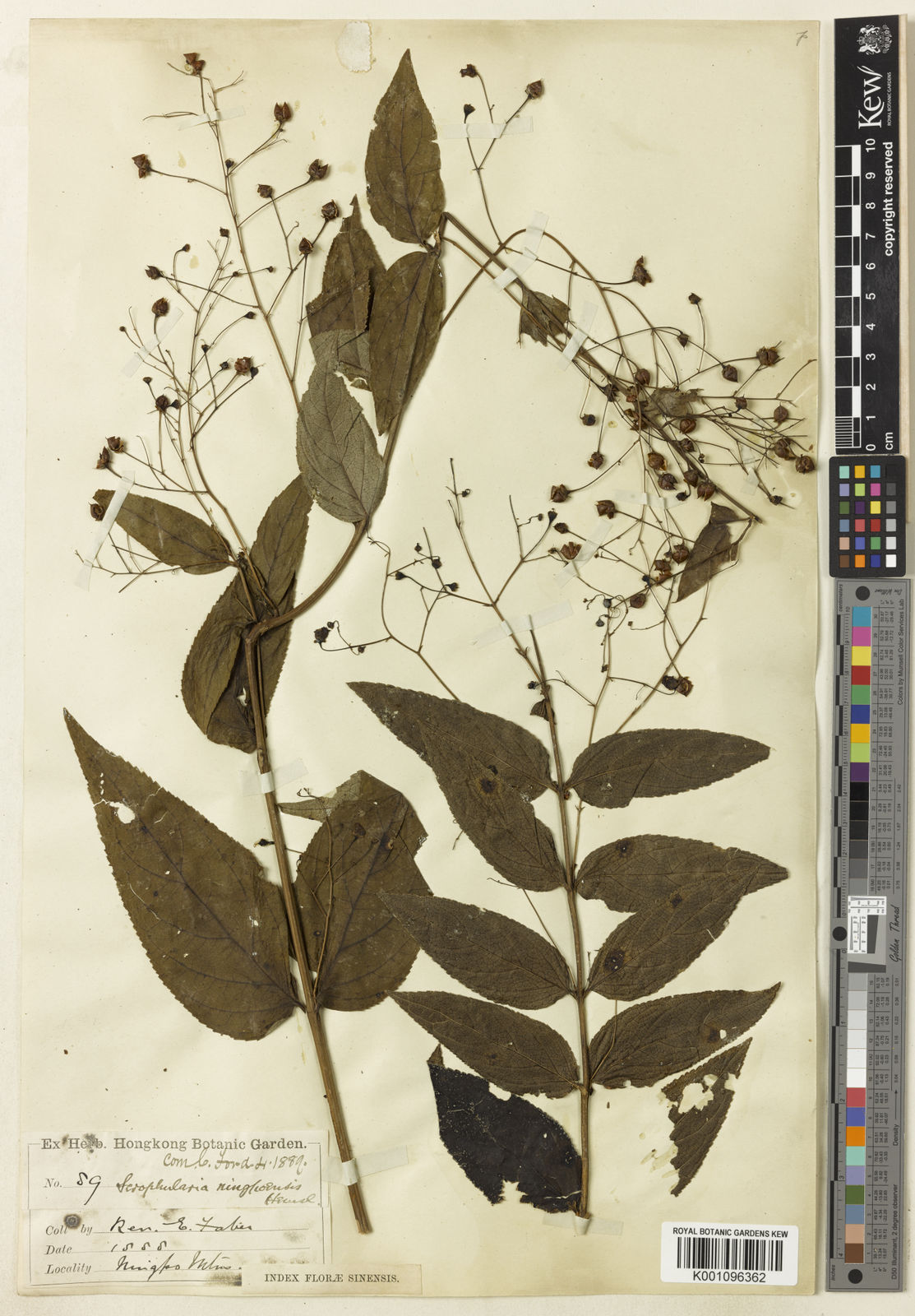

Scientific classification
- Kingdom: Plantae
- Clade: Tracheophytes
- Clade: Angiosperms
- Clade: Eudicots
- Clade: Asterids
- Order: Lamiales
- Family: Scrophulariaceae
- Genus: Scrophularia
- Species: S. ningpoensis

Binomial name
- Scrophularia ningpoensis Hemsl.

Synonyms
- Scrophularia microdonta Franch.; Scrophularia silvestrii Bonati & Pamp.

= Scrophularia ningpoensis =

Species of flowering plant

Scrophularia ningpoensis, commonly known as the Ningpo figwort or Chinese figwort, is a perennial plant in the figwort family, Scrophulariaceae. It reaches 1 m by 0.4 m. Its flowers are hermaphrodite, insect-pollinated and the plant usually flowers in late spring.

This plant has been known to traditional Chinese medicine for as long as 2000 years. Its root is harvested in autumn in Zhejiang province and neighboring areas, then dried for later use.
