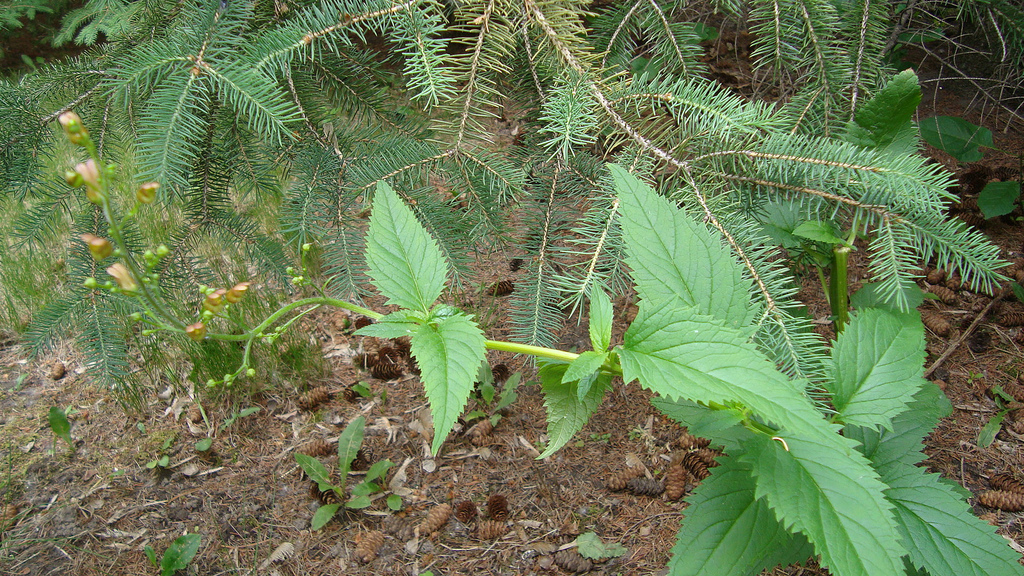

Scientific classification
- Kingdom: Plantae
- Clade: Tracheophytes
- Clade: Angiosperms
- Clade: Eudicots
- Clade: Asterids
- Order: Lamiales
- Family: Scrophulariaceae
- Genus: Scrophularia
- Species: S. lanceolata

Binomial name
- Scrophularia lanceolata Pursh

Synonyms
- List: Scrophularia lanceolata f. lanceolata; Scrophularia nodosa var. lanceolata (Pursh) M.E. Jones; Scrophularia occidentalis (Rydb.) E.P.Bicknell; Scrophularia leporella E.P.Bicknell

= Scrophularia lanceolata =

Species of flowering plant

Scrophularia lanceolata is a species of flowering plant in the figwort family known by the common names lanceleaf figwort and American figwort. It is native to North America, where it is known from western and eastern Canada and much of the United States except for the southeastern quadrant. Past common names include Western figwort when the western US plants were grouped under the name Scrophularia occidentalis and the eastern US plants were called Scrophularia leporella with the common name hare figwort.

== Description and habitat ==
Scrophularia lanceolata is a perennial herb producing clusters of erect or spreading stems up to 1.5 meters long. The oppositely arranged leaves have toothed, triangular or lance-shaped blades up to 14 centimetres (5.5 in) long which are borne on short petioles. The inflorescence is a wide-open panicle with several hairy, glandular branches bearing flowers. The flower has a spherical or urn-shaped corolla opening at the top into a narrow mouth edged with hoodlike lobes. The corolla is roughly 1–1.5 centimetres (0.39–0.59 in) long and is greenish tinged with brown or dull pink. The wide staminode is generally visible in the mouth of the corolla. The ripe fruit is a brown, teardrop-shaped capsule just under a centimeter long, containing many very small black seeds which are released when the capsule splits in half.

It grows part shade to full sun; Scrophularia lanceolata is found in open woods, thickets, along roadsides, and railroad rightaways, and in open fields.

The plant has been used medicinally to treat swollen glands.
