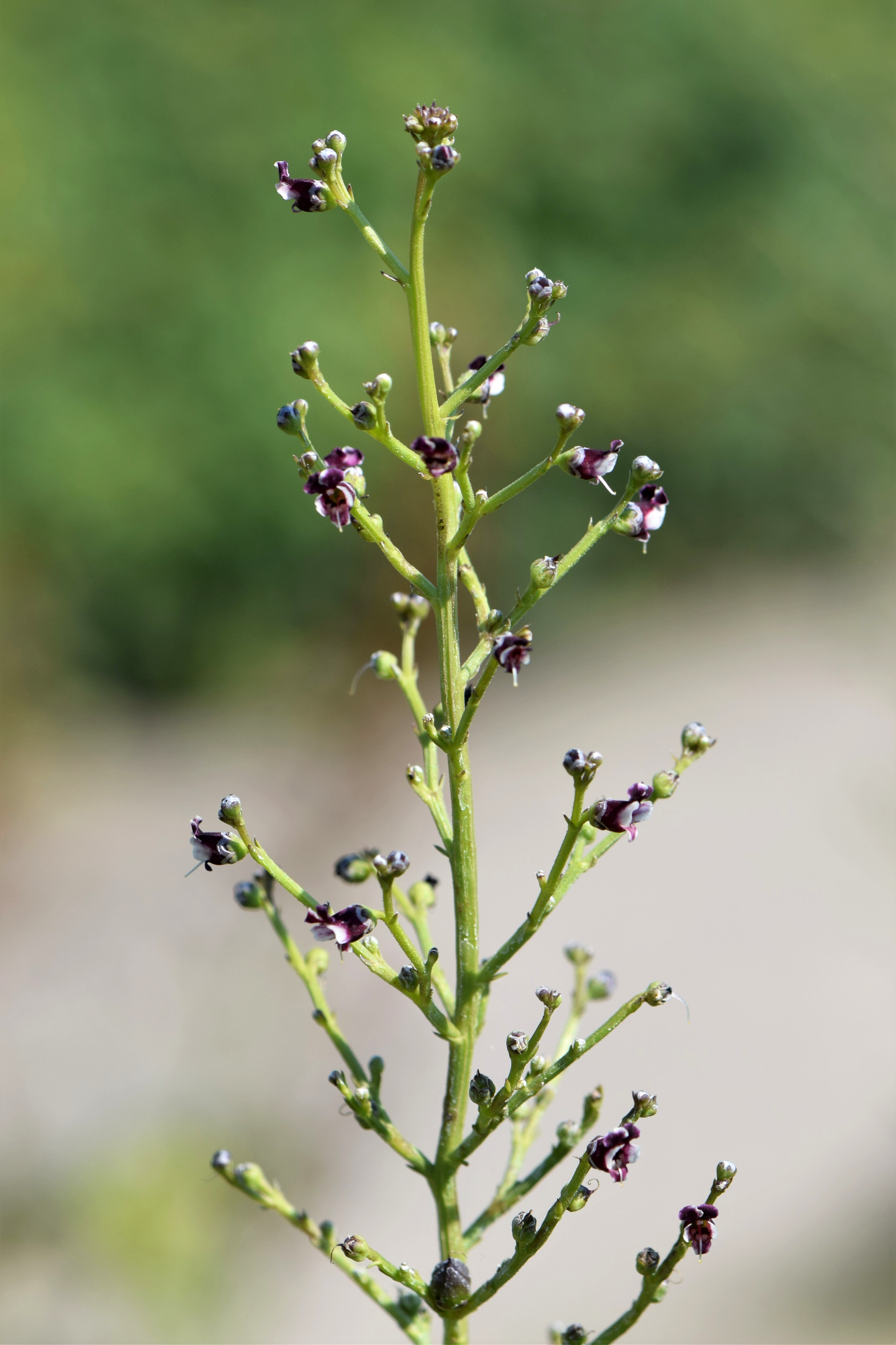
- Inflorescence
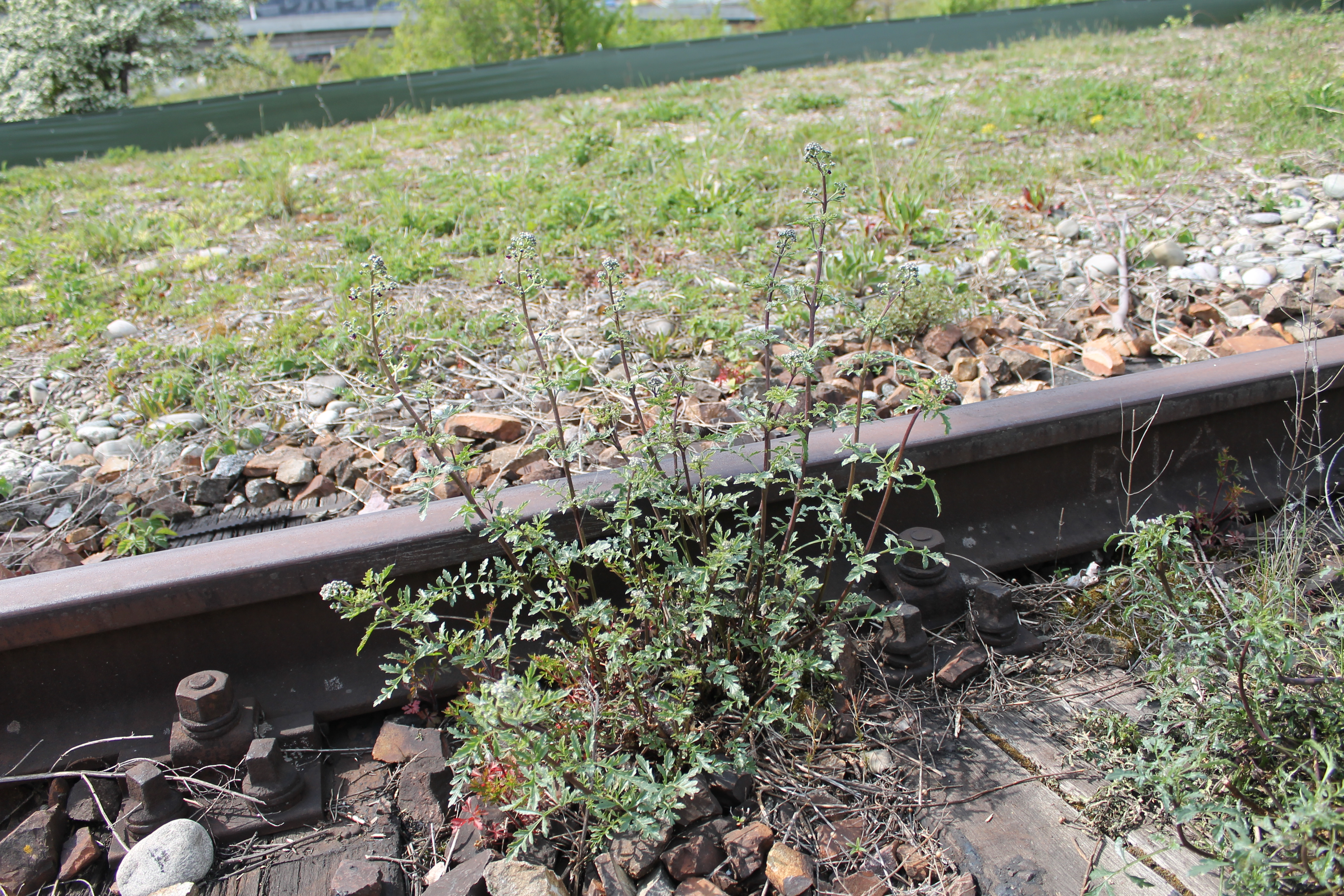
- Habit

Scientific classification
- Kingdom: Plantae
- Clade: Tracheophytes
- Clade: Angiosperms
- Clade: Eudicots
- Clade: Asterids
- Order: Lamiales
- Family: Scrophulariaceae
- Genus: Scrophularia
- Species: S. canina

Binomial name
- Scrophularia canina L.

= Scrophularia canina =

Species of plant

Scrophularia canina, the dog figwort or French figwort, is a species of flowering plant in the family Scrophulariaceae.

== Description ==
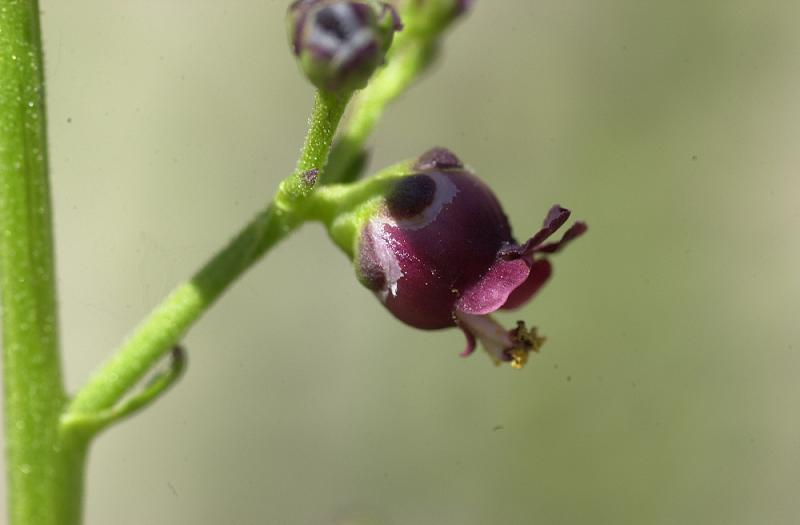
Close-up of flower

Scrophularia canina have a growth form that supports itself and are usually herbaceous perennials. This species has simple and broad leaves, square stems with small two lipped flowers borne in loose terminal clusters. Individual plants can grow to 0.36 m (1 ft 2 in) in height.

== Distribution ==
Scrophularia canina is found in most of southern and central Europe, and in north Africa. Seed dispersal is affected by wind gusts and plant structure.

== Uses ==
It has been used be used in a phytoremediation experiment and has proven to be a more efficient accumulator of lead than Pistacia lentiscus.
