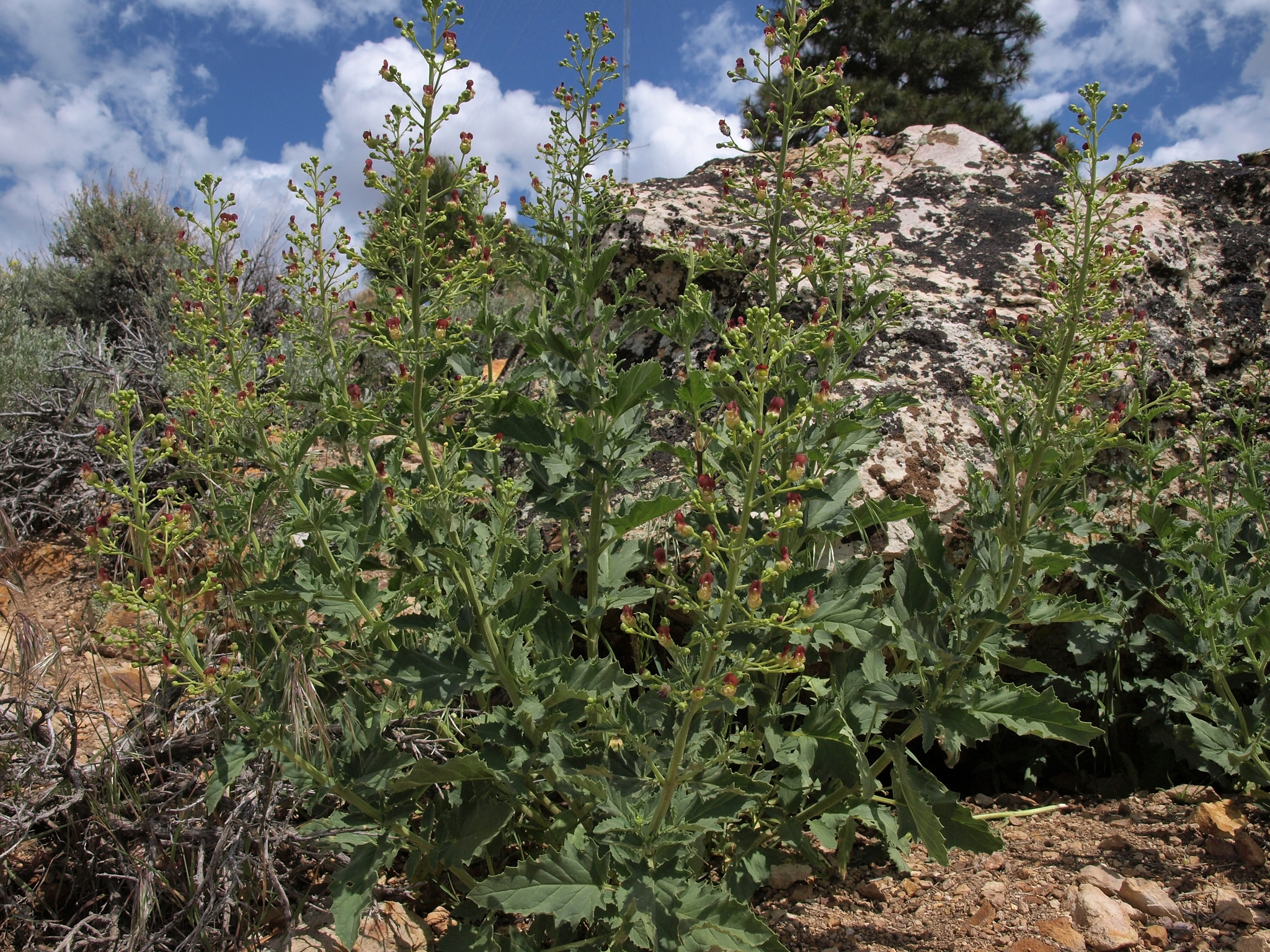

Scientific classification
- Kingdom: Plantae
- Clade: Tracheophytes
- Clade: Angiosperms
- Clade: Eudicots
- Clade: Asterids
- Order: Lamiales
- Family: Scrophulariaceae
- Genus: Scrophularia
- Species: S. desertorum

Binomial name
- Scrophularia desertorum (Munz) R.J.Shaw

= Scrophularia desertorum =

Species of flowering plant

Scrophularia desertorum is a species of flowering plant in the figwort family known by the common name desert figwort. It is native to Nevada and eastern California where it grows in dry areas in local mountain ranges, including the Sierra Nevada and the desert ranges adjacent. It is a perennial herb producing clusters of erect stems that often exceed one meter tall. The leaves have toothed, triangular or lance-shaped blades up to 13 centimeters long which are borne on petioles measuring up to 10 centimeters in length. The inflorescence is a wide-open panicle with several hairy, glandular branches bearing flowers. The flower has a spherical corolla opening at the top into a hoodlike, lobed mouth. The corolla is just under a centimeter long and is whitish at the base and deep red around the mouth and on the lobes. The staminode is generally visible in the mouth of the corolla. The fruit is a capsule just under a centimeter long containing many seeds.
