= Paracorsia =

Scientific classification
- Kingdom: Animalia
- Phylum: Arthropoda
- Clade: Pancrustacea
- Class: Insecta
- Order: Lepidoptera
- Family: Crambidae
- Subfamily: Pyraustinae
- Genus: Paracorsia; Marion, 1959
- Species: P. repandalis

Binomial name
- Paracorsia repandalis (Denis & Schiffermuller, 1775)

Synonyms
- Pyralis repandalis Denis & Schiffermuller, 1775; Pyralis pallidalis Hübner, 1796

Genus of moths

Paracorsia is a monotypic genus of moth in the family Crambidae described by H. Marion in 1959. It contains only one species, Paracorsia repandalis, described by Michael Denis and Ignaz Schiffermüller in 1775. It is found in most of Europe, except Ireland, Fennoscandia and the Baltic region. It has also been recorded from central Asia, including Iran and Kyrgyzstan and North America where it has been recorded in southern Ontario and northern Indiana.

The wingspan is 24–28 mm. Adults are on wing from April to October in two generations per year.

The larvae feed on Verbascum species, including Verbascum lychnitis, Verbascum thapsus and Verbascum phlomoides. Pupation occurs in early spring after hibernating in a case.
