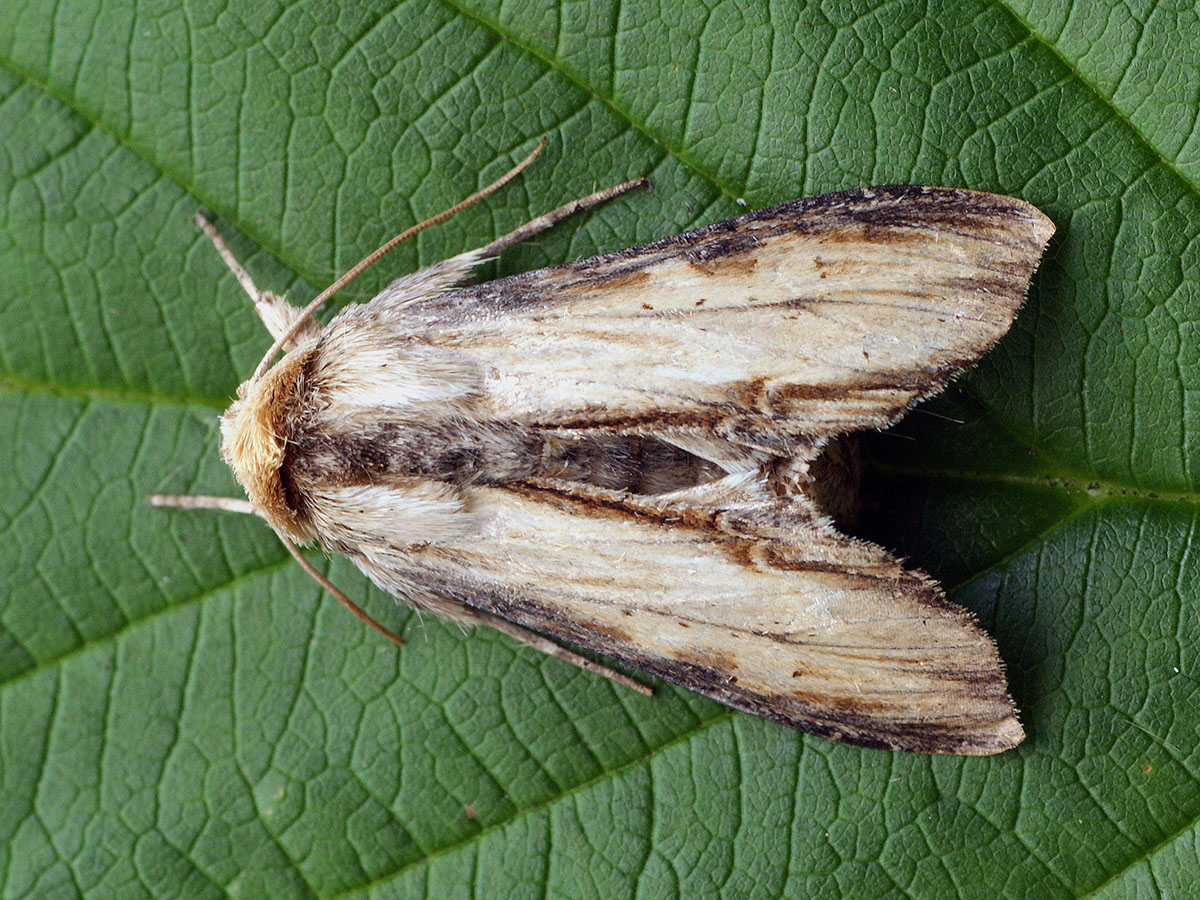

Scientific classification
- Domain: Eukaryota
- Kingdom: Animalia
- Phylum: Arthropoda
- Class: Insecta
- Order: Lepidoptera
- Superfamily: Noctuoidea
- Family: Noctuidae
- Genus: Shargacucullia
- Species: S. lychnitis

Binomial name
- Shargacucullia lychnitis (Rambur, 1833)

Synonyms
- Cucullia lychnitis Rambur, 1833; Cucullia rosamaria Kostrowicki, 1956; Cucullia symaea Koutsaftikis, 1974

= Shargacucullia lychnitis =

Species of moth

Shargacucullia lychnitis, the striped lychnis is a moth of the family Noctuidae. It is found throughout most parts of Europe the Near East and Middle East (Lebanon, Israel, Afghanistan, Iran, Turkmenistan and Iraq).

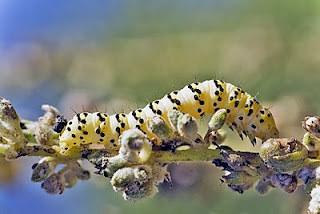
Larvae

== Technical description and variation ==
C. lychnitis Rmb. (27 g). Forewing narrow, pale ochreous with a more rufous tinge than in thapsiphaga [Shargacucullia thapsiphaga (Treitschke, 1826) ], the costal streak darker; hindwing in both sexes whitish, the terminal shade narrower in the male. Larva greenish white with a pale yellow band on each segment; a dorsal row of curved black bars alternating with rows of 4 black spots; a row of black spots along the sides. The wingspan is 42–47 mm.

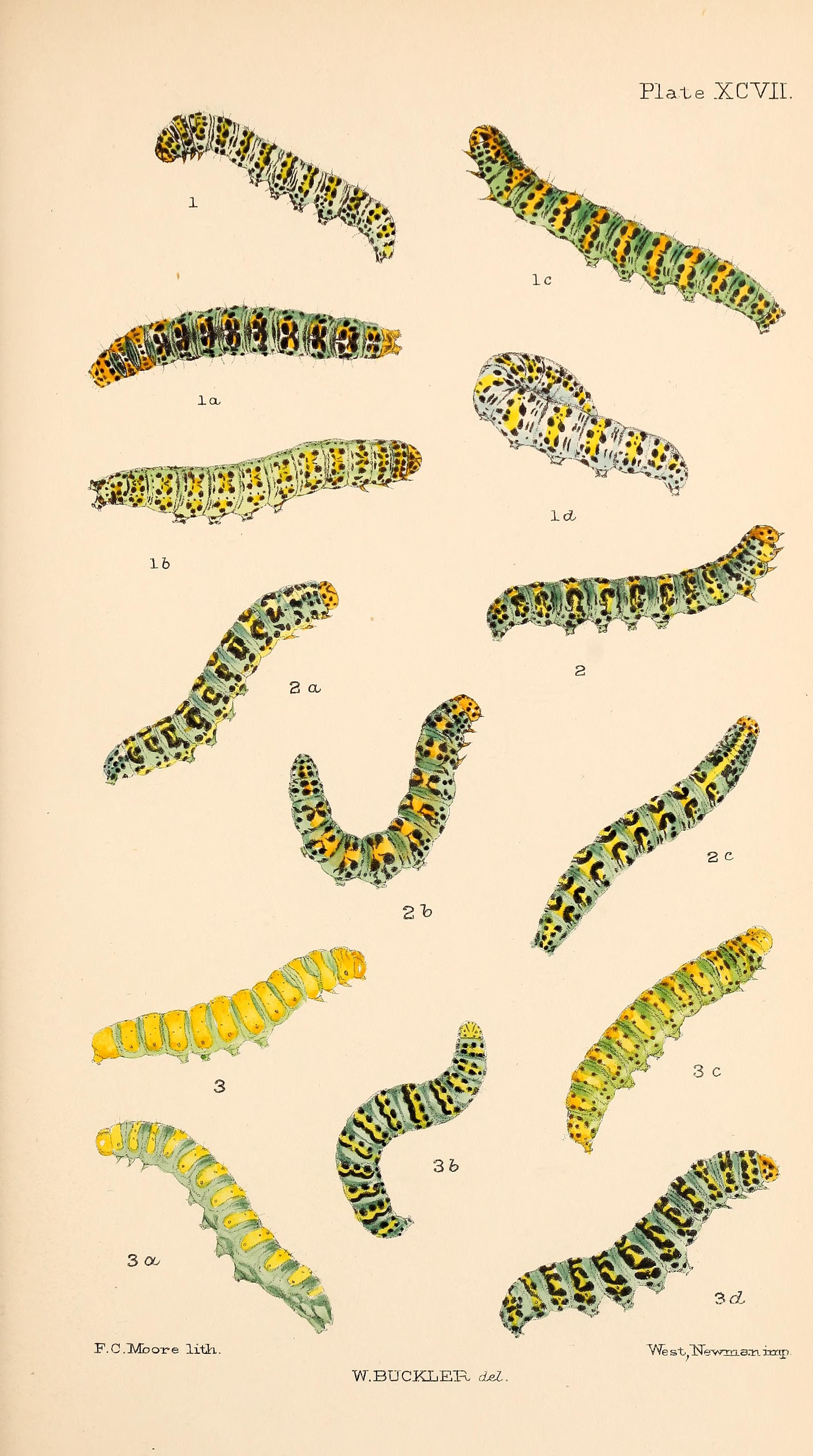
Figs.3, 3a, 3b, 3c, 3d larvae after last moult

== Biology ==
Adults are on wing from February to April in the eastern parts of its range. In Britain it is on wing from June to July. There is one generation per year.

The larvae feed on the leaves and flowers of Verbascum species (including Verbascum lychnitis, Verbascum nigrum and Verbascum austriacum).

== Subspecies ==
- Shargacucullia lychnitis lychnitis
- Shargacucullia lychnitis albicans (eastern part of the range)

== Similar species ==
Shargacucullia lychnitis is difficult to certainly distinguish from these congeners. See Townsend et al.

- Shargacucullia scrophulariae ([Denis & Schiffermüller], 1775)
- Shargacucullia verbasci (Linnaeus, 1758)
