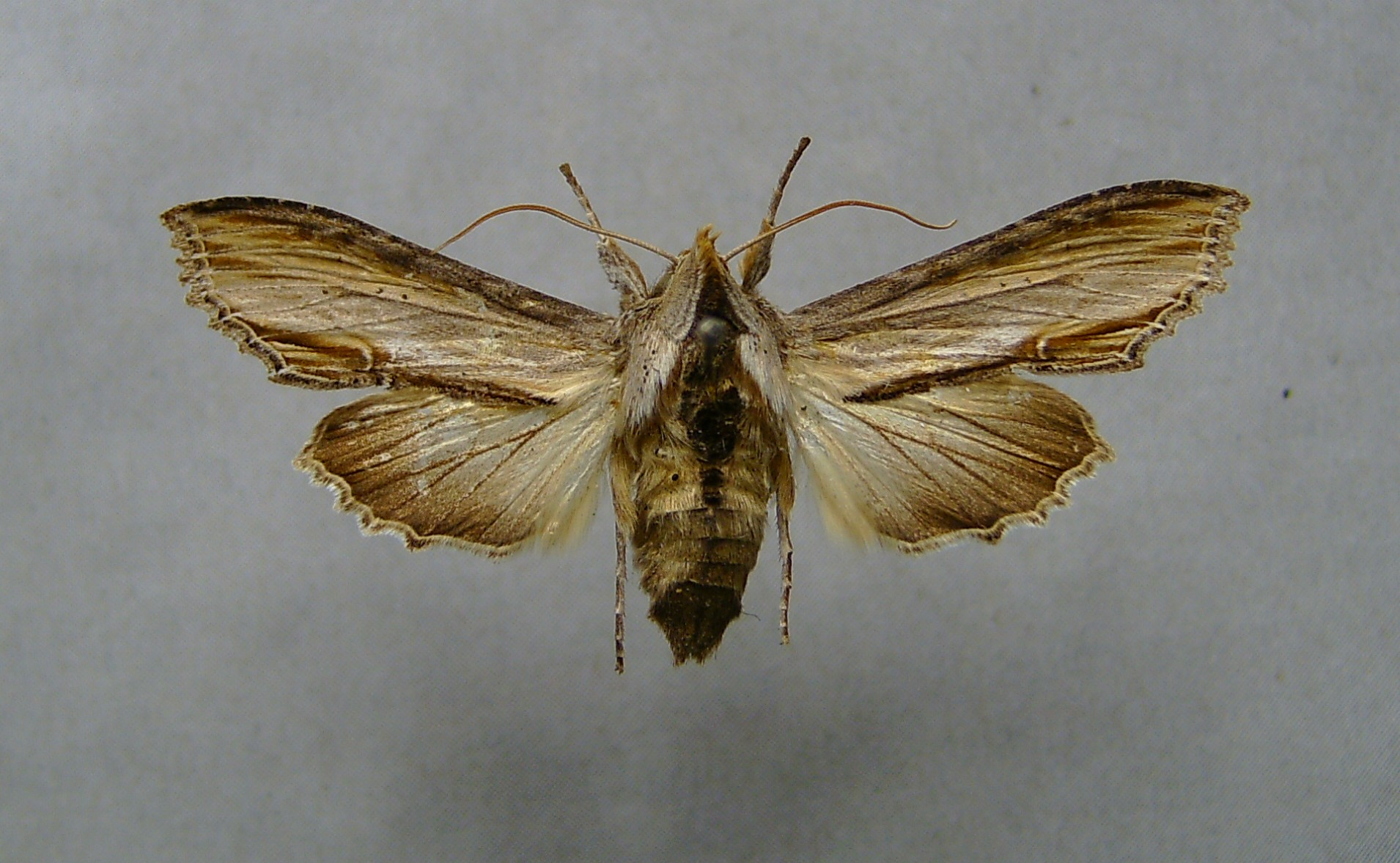

Scientific classification
- Domain: Eukaryota
- Kingdom: Animalia
- Phylum: Arthropoda
- Class: Insecta
- Order: Lepidoptera
- Superfamily: Noctuoidea
- Family: Noctuidae
- Genus: Shargacucullia
- Species: S. scrophulariae

Binomial name
- Shargacucullia scrophulariae (Denis & Schiffermüller, 1775)

Synonyms
- Cucullia scrophulariae; Noctua scrophulariae; Shargacucullia rivulorum

= Shargacucullia scrophulariae =

Species of moth

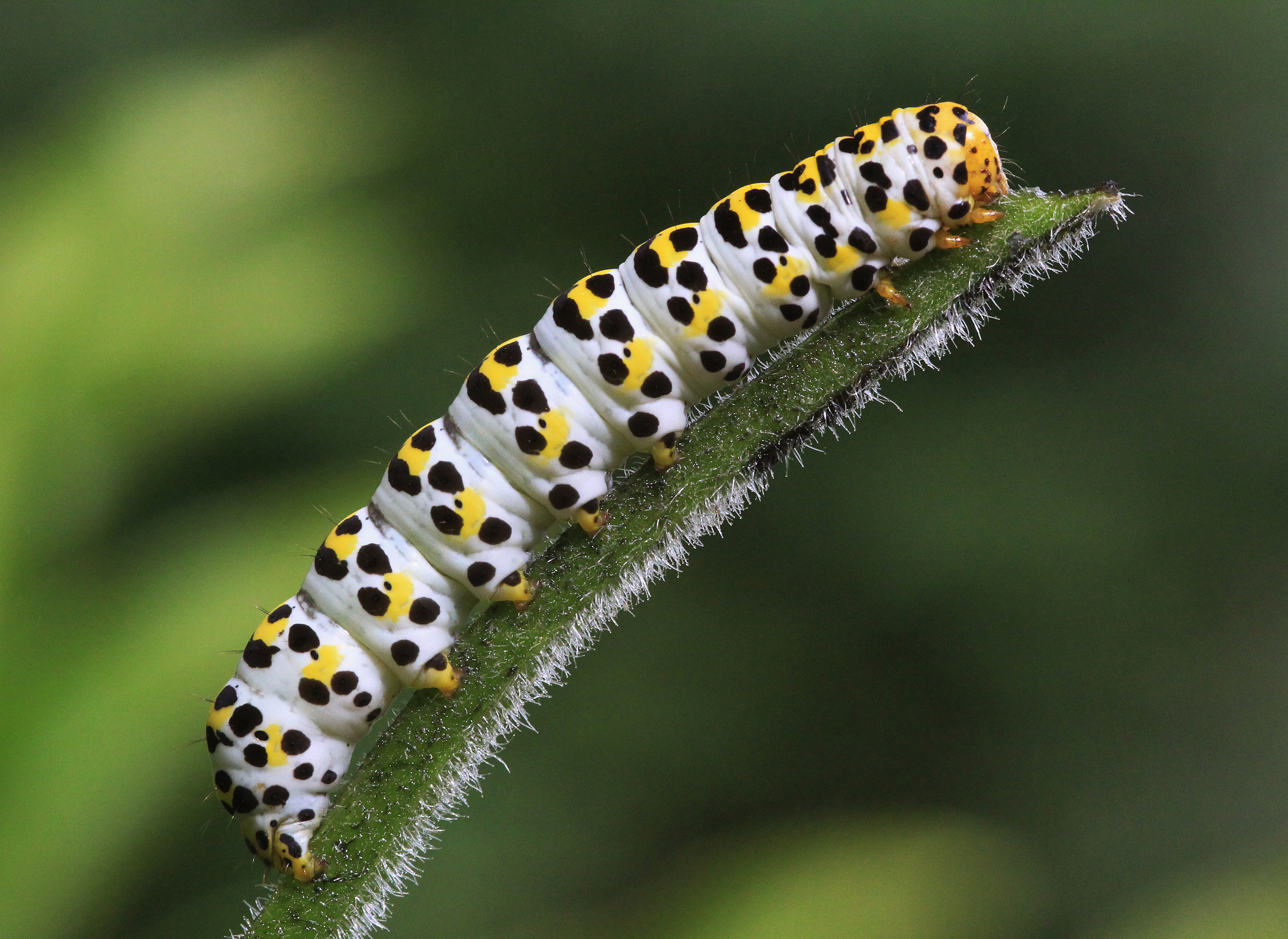
Shargacucullia scrophulariae - MHNT

Shargacucullia scrophulariae, the water betony, is a moth of the family Noctuidae. It is found throughout Europe, east to Turkey.

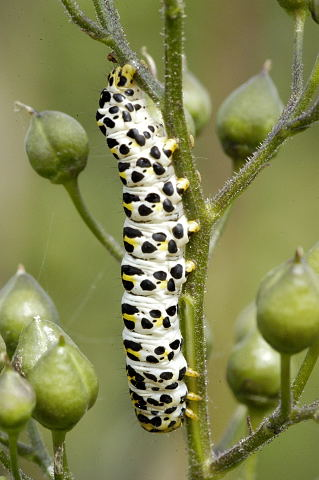
Caterpillar

== Technical description and variation ==
C. scrophulariae Cap. (27 h). Not quite so broad as verbasci, the forewing paler and duller in coloration; the dark brown costal streak overlaid with grey and so paler than those on inner margin; the ground colour below median hardly paler, not strikingly whitish; hindwing much as in verbasci. The wingspan is about 45 mm.

== Biology ==
The moth flies from May to August depending on the location.

The larvae feed on Scrophularia umbrosa, Scrophularia nodosa, Scrophularia auriculata, Scrophularia canina, Verbascum lychnitis and Verbascum thapsus.

== Similar species ==
Shargacucullia scrophulariae is difficult to certainly distinguish from these congeners. See Townsend et al.

- Shargacucullia verbasci (Linnaeus, 1758)
- Shargacucullia lychnitis (Rambur, 1833)
