= Albert Zerkowitz =

- Born: 13 January 1905; Budapest, Austria-Hungary
- Died: 1964 (aged 58–59); Manhattan, New York, United States
- Citizenship: Hungary (1905 - 1939); Stateless (1939-1942); United States (1942-1964)
- Spouse: Elisabeth ("Liesel") Victoria REIS

Albert Zerkowitz (13 January 1905– 1964) was an entomologist.

== Biography ==
Albert Zerkowitz was born on 13 January 1905 in Budapest, Austria-Hungary and was a Hungarian citizen until 1 January 1939 when by action of his country he became stateless. From 1905 to 1925 he lived in Budapest and from 1925 to 1939 in Paris, before moving to Lisbon (Portugal), where he lived from 1939 until October 1941. He entered the United States at New York City on 14 October 1941 and became a U.S. citizen on 12 May 1947. He continued his passion for Lepidoptera and eventually became a member of the Lepidopterists' Society in 1957.

He took part in the French resistance directing German military trains to wrong destinations, for which after the war he was decorated with the Légion d'Honneur.

=== Death ===
He died 1964 in Paris, France.

== Works ==
His main entomological work was his catalogue of the Lepidoptera of Portugal.

== Species named after Albert Zerkowitz ==
- Cucullia zerkowitzi Boursin 1934, now Shargacucullia zerkowitzi.
