= Shargacucullia anceps =

Scientific classification
- Kingdom: Animalia
- Phylum: Arthropoda
- Class: Insecta
- Order: Lepidoptera
- Superfamily: Noctuoidea
- Family: Noctuidae
- Genus: Shargacucullia
- Species: S. anceps

Binomial name
- Shargacucullia anceps (Staudinger, 1882)

Species of moth

Shargacucullia anceps is a moth of the family Noctuidae first described by Otto Staudinger in 1882. It is found in most parts of Asia Minor, Lebanon, Cyprus and Iran.

Adults are on wing from March to April. There is one generation per year.

The larvae feed on Verbascum species.
