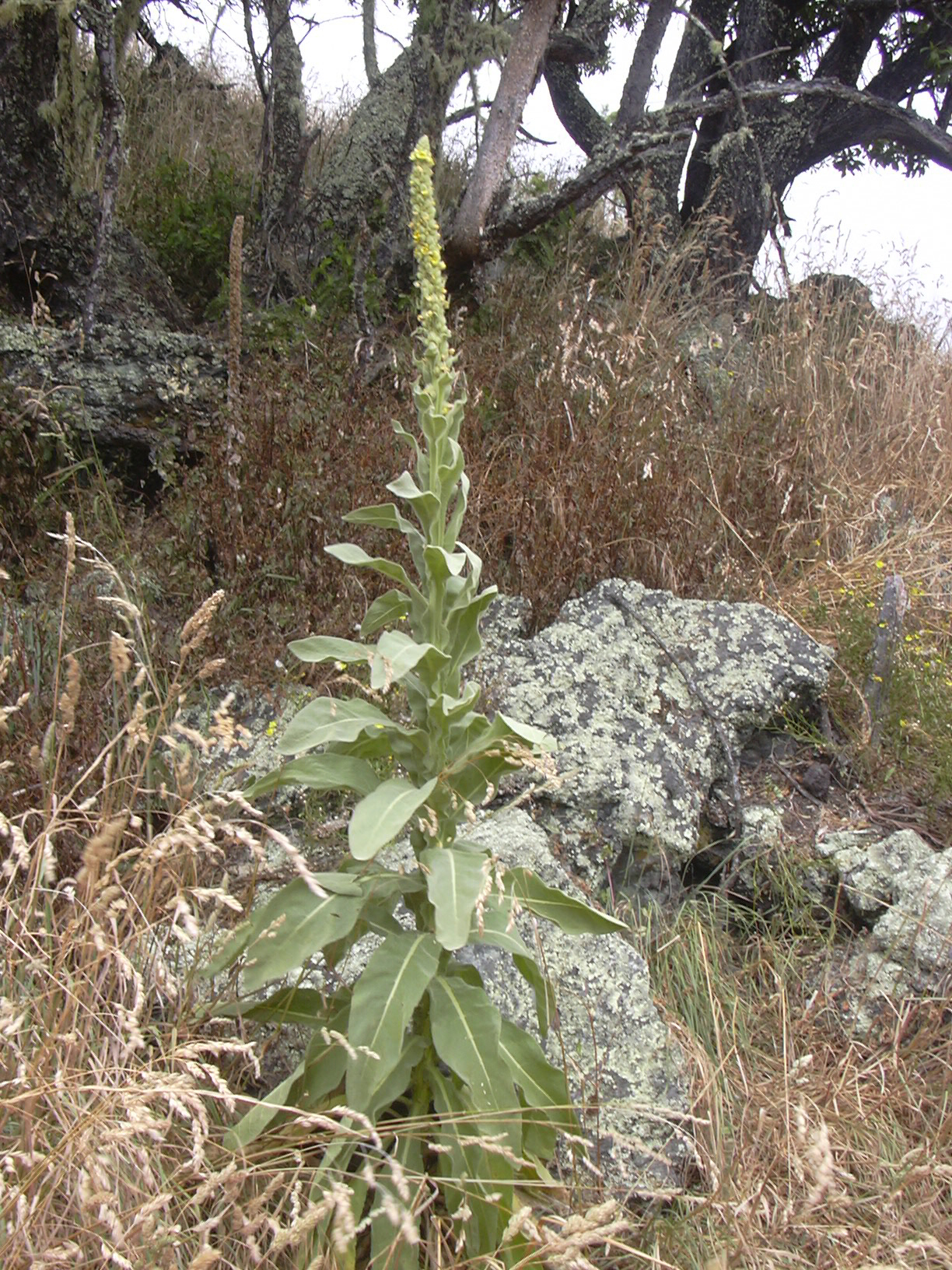
- Second-year plant starting to flower, with a dead stem of the previous year, behind left

Scientific classification
- Kingdom: Plantae
- Clade: Embryophytes
- Clade: Tracheophytes
- Clade: Angiosperms
- Clade: Eudicots
- Clade: Asterids
- Order: Lamiales
- Family: Scrophulariaceae
- Genus: Verbascum
- Species: V. thapsus

Binomial name
- Verbascum thapsus Linnaeus

= Verbascum thapsus =

Species of plant

Verbascum thapsus, the great mullein, greater mullein or common mullein, is a species of mullein native to Europe, northern Africa, and Asia, and introduced in the Americas, Australia and New Zealand.

It is a hairy biennial plant that can grow to 2 m tall or more. Its small, yellow flowers are densely grouped on a tall stem, which grows from a large rosette of leaves. It grows in a wide variety of habitats, but prefers well-lit, disturbed soils, where it can appear soon after the ground receives light, from long-lived seeds that persist in the soil seed bank. It is a common weedy plant that spreads by prolifically producing seeds, and has become invasive in temperate world regions. It is a minor problem for most agricultural crops, since it is not a competitive species, being intolerant of shade from other plants and unable to survive tilling. It also hosts many insects, some of which can be harmful to other plants. Although individuals are easy to remove by hand, populations are difficult to eliminate permanently.

Although commonly used in traditional medicine, no approved drugs are made from this plant. It has been used to make dyes and torches.

== Description ==
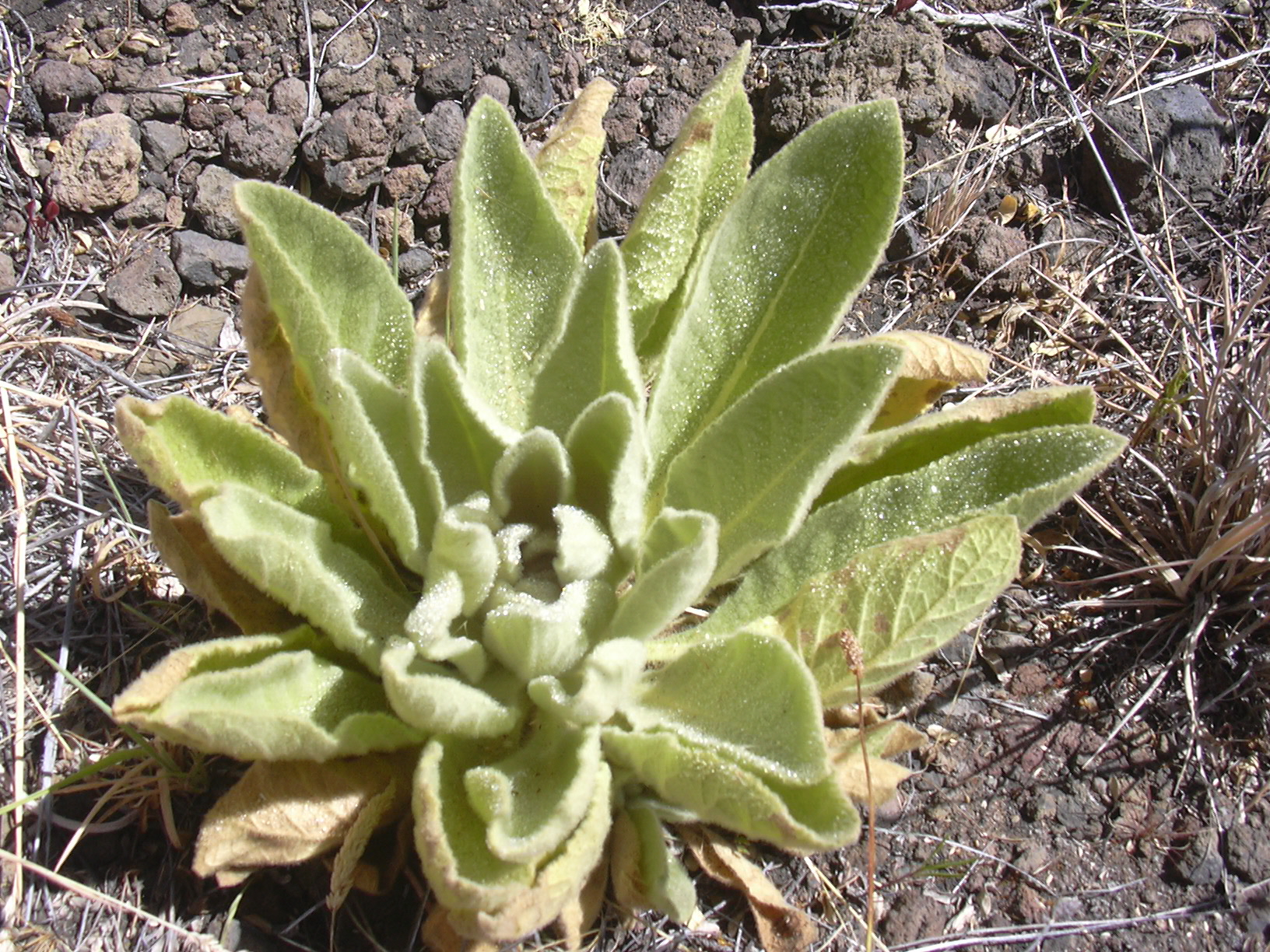
A stemless rosette in Hawaii

V. thapsus is a dicotyledonous plant that produces a rosette of leaves in its first year of growth. The leaves are large, up to 50 cm long. The second-year plants normally produce a single unbranched stem, usually 1–2 m tall. In the eastern part of its range in China, it is, however, only reported to grow up to 1.5 m tall. The tall, pole-like stems end in a dense spike of flowers that can occupy up to half the stem length. All parts of the plants are covered with star-shaped trichomes. This cover is particularly thick on the leaves, giving them a silvery appearance. The species' chromosome number is 2n = 36.

On flowering plants, the leaves are alternately arranged up the stem. They are thick and decurrent, with much variation in leaf shape between the upper and lower leaves on the stem, ranging from oblong to oblanceolate, and reaching sizes up to 50 cm long and 14 cm across (19 inches long and 5 inches wide). They become smaller higher up the stem, and less strongly decurrent down the stem. The flowering stem is solid and 2–2.5 cm (nearly an inch) across, and occasionally branched just below the inflorescence, usually following damage. After flowering and seed release, the stem and fruits usually persist in winter, drying into dark brown, stiff structures of densely packed, ovoid-shaped, and dry seed capsules. The dried stems may persist into the following spring or even the next summer. The plant produces a shallow taproot.

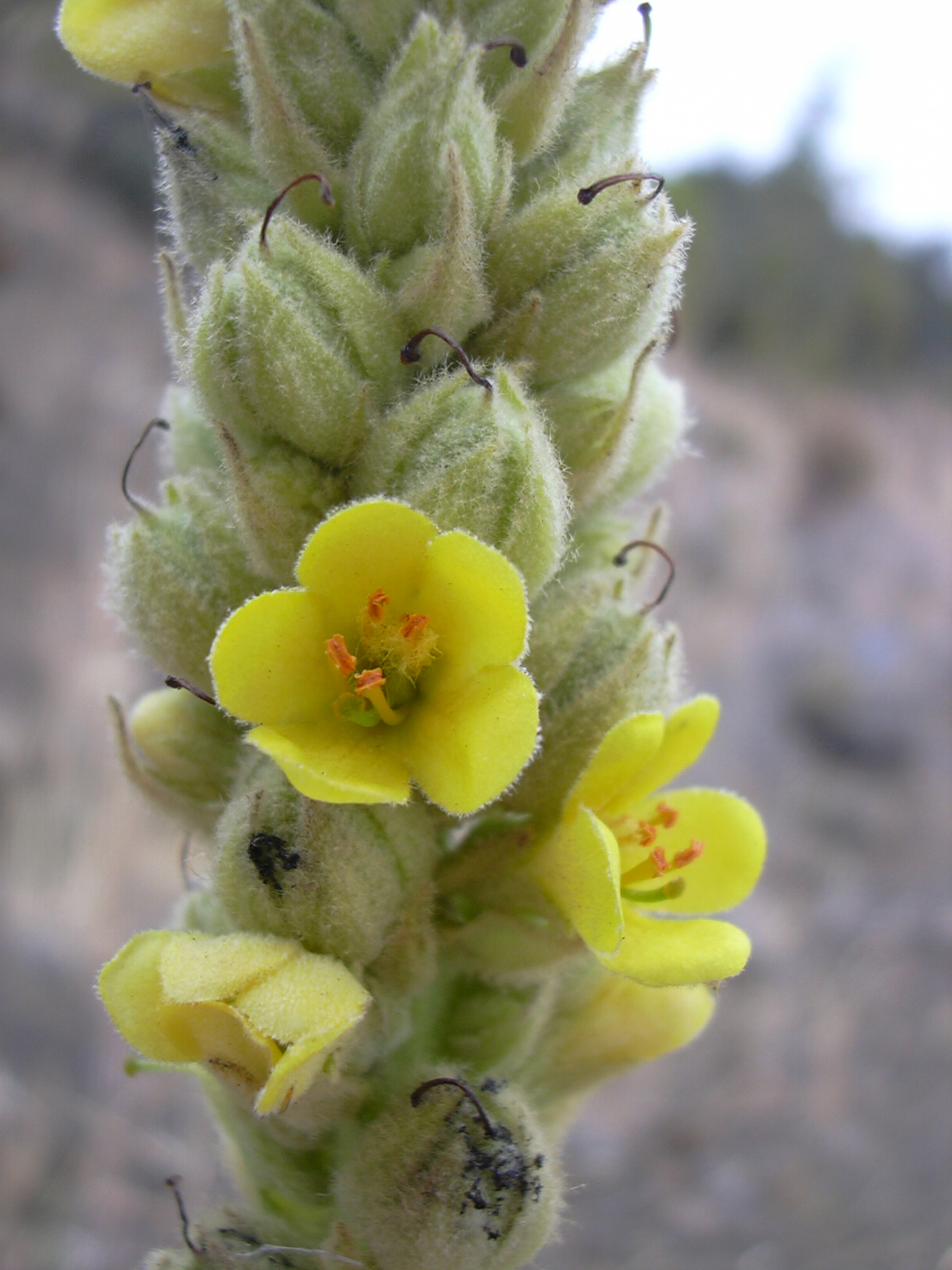
A closeup of the flowers

Flowers are pentamerous with (usually) five stamen, a five-lobed calyx tube, and a five-petalled corolla, the latter bright yellow and 1.5–3 cm (0.59–1.18 in) wide. The flowers are almost sessile, with very short pedicels (2 mm, 0.08 in). The five stamens are of two types, with the three upper stamens being shorter, their filaments covered by yellow or whitish hairs, and having smaller anthers, while the lower two stamens have glabrous filaments and larger anthers. (Note: They are all hairy in subspecies V. crassifolium and V. giganteum.) The plant produces small, ovoid (6 mm, 0.24 in) capsules that split open by way of two valves, each capsule containing large numbers of minute, brown seeds less than 1 mm (0.04 in) in size, marked with longitudinal ridges. A white-flowered form, V. thapsus f. candicans, is known to occur. Flowering lasts up to three months from early to late summer (June to August in northern Europe), with flowering starting at the bottom of the spike and progressing irregularly upward; each flower opens for part of a day and only a few open at the same time around the stem.

== Taxonomy ==
For the purpose of botanical nomenclature, Verbascum thapsus was first described by Carl Linnaeus in his 1753 Species Plantarum. The specific epithet thapsus had been first used by Theophrastus (as Θάψος, Thapsos) for an unspecified herb from the Ancient Greek settlement of Thapsos, near modern Syracuse, Sicily, though it is often assimilated to the ancient Tunisian city of Thapsus.

At the time, no type specimen was specified, as the practice only arose later, in the 19th century. When a lectotype (type selected amongst original material) was designated, it was assigned to specimen 242.1 of Linnaeus' herbarium, the only V. thapsus specimen. (Note: The lectotypification is usually attributed to Arthur Huber-Morath (1971) Denkschriften der Schweizerischen Naturforschenden Gesellschaft 87:43. Some disagree since Huber-Morath did not specifically cite sheet 242.1, and credit instead L. H. Cramer, in Dassanayake & Fosberg (1981) A Revised Handbook to the Flora of Ceylon 3:389.) The species had previously been designated as type species for Verbascum. European plants exhibit considerable phenotypical variation, which has led to the plant acquiring many synonyms over the years. Introduced American populations show much less variation.

The taxonomy of Verbascum has not undergone any significant revision since Svanve Mürbeck's monographs in the 1930s, with the exception of the work of Arthur Huber-Morath, who used informal grouping in organizing the genus for the florae of Iran and Turkey to account for many intermediate species. Since Huber-Morath's groups are not taxonomical, Mürbeck's treatment is the most current one available, as no study has yet sought to apply genetic or molecular data extensively to the genus. In Mürbeck's classification, V. thapsus is placed in sect. Bothrospermae subsect. Fasciculata alongside species such as Verbascum nigrum (black or dark mullein), Verbascum lychnitis (white mullein), and Verbascum sinuatum (wavy-leaved mullein). As Verbascum thapsus is the type species of the genus the application of article 22 of the ICNafp gives sect. Verbascum subsect. Verbascum as the correct nomenclature for this placement.

=== Subspecies and hybrids ===
Hybrids of Verbascum thapsus
Hybrid name	Other parent species	Notes
V. × duernsteinense Teyber	V. speciosum	
V. × godronii Boreau	V. pulverulentum	
V. × kerneri Fritsch	V. phlomoides	
V. × lemaitrei Boreau	V. virgatum	
V. × pterocaulon Franch.	V. blattaria	
V. × thapsi L.	V. lychnitis	syn. V. × spurium W.D.J.Koch, may be a nomen ambiguum
V. × semialbum Chaub.	V. nigrum	
none	V. pyramidatum	

The three usually recognized subspecies are:

- V. t. thapsus; type, widespread.
- V. t. crassifolium (Lam.) Murb.; Mediterranean region and to 2000 metres in southwestern Austria. (syn. subsp. montanum (Scrad.) Bonnier & Layens)
- V. t. giganteum (Willk.) Nyman; Spain, endemic.

In all subspecies but the type, the lower stamens are also hairy. In V. t. crassifolium, the hairiness is less dense and often absent from the upper part of the anthers, while lower leaves are hardly decurrent and have longer petioles. In V. t. giganteum, the hairs are densely white tomentose, and lower leaves are strongly decurrent. V. t. crassifolium also differs from the type in having slightly larger flowers, which measure 15–30 mm wide, whereas in the type, they are 12–20 mm in diameter. Both V. t. giganteum and V. t. crassifolium were originally described as species. Due to its morphological variation, V. thapsus has had a great many subspecies described. A recent revision led its author to maintain V. giganteum but sink V. crassifolium into synonymy.

The plant is also parent to several hybrids (see table). Of these, the most common is V. × semialbum Chaub. (× V. nigrum). All occur in Eurasia, and three, V. × kerneri Fritsch, V. × pterocaulon Franch. and V. × thapsi L. (syn. V. × spurium W.D.J.Koch), have also been reported in North America.

=== Common names ===
V. thapsus is known by a variety of names. European reference books call it "great mullein". In North America, "common mullein" is used while western United States residents sometimes refer to mullein as "cowboy toilet paper".

In the 19th century, it had well over 40 different common names in English alone. Some of the more whimsical ones included "hig candlewick", "Indian rag weed", "bullicks lungwort", "Adams-rod", "hare's-beard", and "ice-leaf". Vernacular names include innumerable references to the plant's hairiness: “lamb’s ear”, "woolly mullein", "velvet mullein", or "blanket mullein", "beggar's blanket", "Moses' blanket", "poor man's blanket", "Our Lady's blanket", or "old man's blanket", and "feltwort", and so on ("flannel" is another common generic name). "Mullein" itself derives from the French word for "soft".

Some names refer to the plant's size and shape: "shepherd's club(s)" or "staff", "Aaron's rod" (a name it shares with a number of other plants with tall, yellow inflorescences), and a plethora of other "X's staff" and "X's rod". The name "velvet dock" or "mullein dock" is also recorded, where "dock" is a British name applied to any broad-leaved plant.

Alongside Aaron's rod, Verbascum thapsus is sometimes referred to as Aaron's beard, a name it shares with several other plants.

== Distribution and habitat ==
V. thapsus has a wide native range including Europe, northern Africa, and Asia, from the Azores and Canary Islands east to western China, north to the British Isles, Scandinavia, and Siberia, Kashmir and south to the Himalayas. In northern Europe, it grows from sea level up to 1,850 m altitude, while in China it grows at 1,400–3,200 m altitude.

It has been introduced throughout the temperate world, and is established as a weed in Australia, New Zealand, tropical Asia, La Réunion, North America, Hawaii, Chile, Hispaniola, and Argentina. It has also been reported in Japan.

In the United States, it was imported very early in the 18th (Note: The 1630 number in Mitch may be a typo: the beginning of the 18th century is cited in other sources.) century and cultivated for its medicinal and piscicide properties. By 1818, it had begun spreading so much that Amos Eaton thought it was a native plant. (Note: Eaton went so far as to write: "When botanists are so infatuated with wild speculation, as to tell us the mullein was introduced, they give our youngest pupils occasion to sneer at their teachers.") In 1839, it was already reported in Michigan and in 1876, in California. It is now found commonly in all the states. In Canada, it is most common in the Maritime Provinces and southern Quebec, Ontario, and British Columbia, with scattered populations in between.

Great mullein most frequently grows as a colonist of bare and disturbed soil, usually on sandy or chalky ones. It grows best in dry, sandy, or gravelly soils, although it can grow in a variety of habitats, including banksides, meadows, roadsides, forest clearings, and pastures. This ability to grow in a wide range of habitats has been linked to strong phenotype variation rather than adaptation capacities.

== Ecology ==
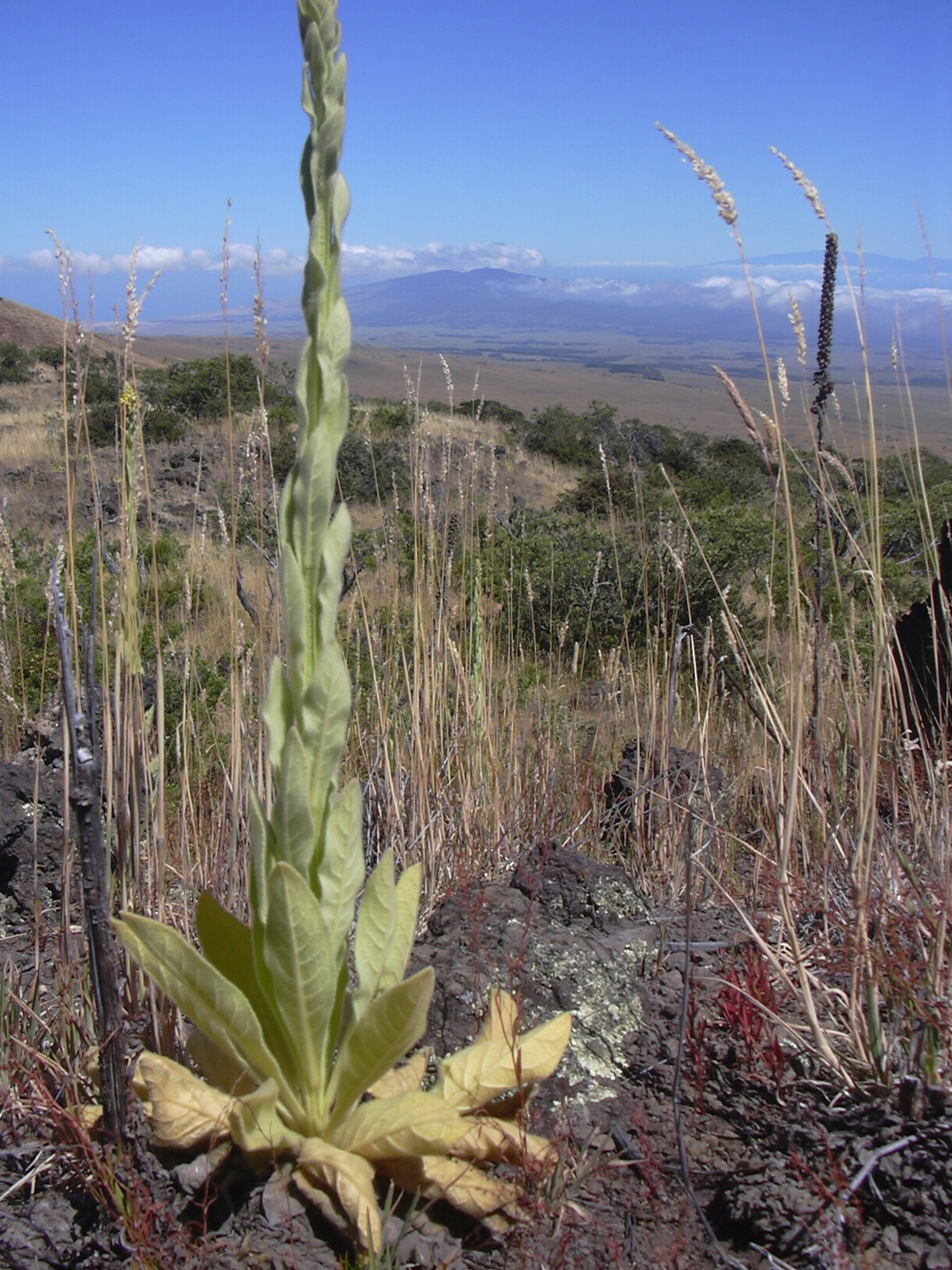
V. thapsus grows best with little competition.

Great mullein is a biennial and generally requires winter dormancy before it can flower. This dormancy is linked to starch degradation activated by low temperatures in the root, and gibberellin application bypasses this requirement. Seeds germinate almost solely in bare soil, at temperatures between 10 and 40 °C. While they can germinate in total darkness if proper conditions are present (tests give a 35% germination rate under ideal conditions), in the wild, they in practice only do so when exposed to light, or very close to the soil surface, which explains the plant's habitat preferences. While it can also grow in areas where some vegetation already exists, growth of the rosettes on bare soil is four to seven times more rapid.

Seeds germinate in spring and summer. Those that germinate in autumn produce plants that overwinter if they are large enough, while rosettes less than 15 cm (6 in) across die in winter. After flowering, the entire plant usually dies at the end of its second year, but some individuals, especially in the northern parts of the range, require a longer growth period and flower in their third year. Under better growing conditions, some individuals flower in the first year. Triennial individuals have been found to produce fewer seeds than biennial and annual ones. While year of flowering and size are linked to the environment, most other characteristics appear to be genetic.

A given flower is open only for a single day, opening before dawn and closing in the afternoon. Flowers are self-fecundating and protogynous (with female parts maturing first), and will self-pollinate if they have not been pollinated by insects during the day. While many insects visit the flowers, only some bees actually accomplish pollination. The flowering period of V. thapsus lasts from June to August in most of its range, extending to September or October in warmer climates. Visitors include halictid bees and hoverflies. The hair on lower stamens may serve to provide footholds for visitors.

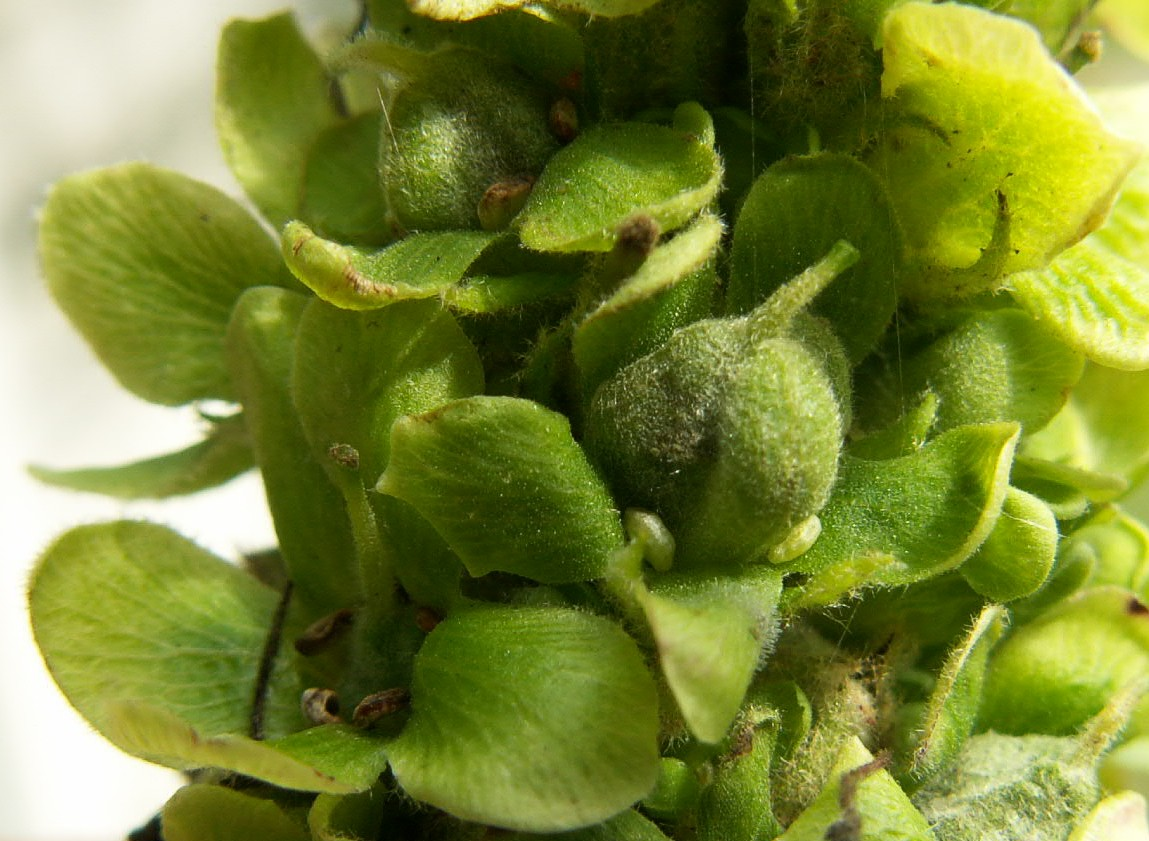
The fruit of great mullein contains large numbers of minute seeds.

The seeds maintain their germinative powers for decades, up to 100 years, according to some studies. Because of this, and because the plant is an extremely prolific seed bearer (each plant produces hundreds of capsules, each containing up to 700 seeds, with a total up to 180,000 or 240,000 seeds), it remains in the soil seed bank for extended periods of time, and can sprout from apparently bare ground, or shortly after forest fires long after previous plants have died. Its population pattern typically consists of an ephemeral adult population followed by a long period of dormancy as seeds. Great mullein rarely establishes on new grounds without human intervention because its seeds do not disperse very far. Seed dispersion requires the stem to be moved by wind or animal movement; 75% of the seeds fall within 1 m of the parent plant, and 93% fall within 5 m.

Megachilid bees of the genus Anthidium use the hair (amongst that of various woolly plants) in making their nests. The seeds are generally too small for birds to feed on, although the American goldfinch has been reported to consume them. Other bird species have been reported to consume the leaves (Hawaiian goose) or flowers (palila), or to use the plant as a source when foraging for insects (white-headed woodpecker). Additionally, deer and elk eat the leaves.

== Fossil record ==
Seeds of V. thapsus have been recorded from part of the Cromer Forest Bed series and at West Wittering in Sussex from some parts of the Ipswichian interglacial layers.

== Agricultural impacts and control ==
Because it cannot compete with established plants, great mullein is no longer considered a serious agricultural weed and is easily crowded out in cultivation, except in areas where vegetation is sparse to begin with, such as Californian semidesertic areas of the eastern Sierra Nevada in the USA. In such ecological contexts, it crowds out native herbs and grasses; its tendency to appear after forest fires also disturbs the normal ecological succession. Although not an agricultural threat, its presence can be very difficult to eradicate and is especially problematic in overgrazed pastures. The species is legally listed as a noxious weed in the US state of Colorado (class C) and Hawaii, and the Australian state of Victoria (regionally prohibited in the West Gippsland region, and regionally controlled in several others).

Despite not being an agricultural weed in itself, it hosts a number of insects and diseases, including both pests and beneficial insects. It is also a potential reservoir of the cucumber mosaic virus, Erysiphum cichoraceum (the cucurbit powdery mildew) and Texas root rot. A study found V. thapsus hosts insects from 29 different families. Most of the pests found were western flower thrips (Frankliniella occidentalis), Lygus species such as the tarnished plant bug (L. lineolaris), and various spider mites from the family Tetranychidae. These make the plant a potential reservoir for overwintering pests.

Other insects commonly found on great mullein feed exclusively on Verbascum species in general or V. thapsus in particular. They include mullein thrips (Haplothrips verbasci), Gymnaetron tetrum (whose larva consume the seeds), and the mullein moth (Cucullia verbasci). Useful insects are also hosted by great mullein, including predatory mites of the genera Galendromus, Typhlodromus, and Amblyseius, the minute pirate bug Orius tristicolor, and the mullein bug (Campylomma verbasci). The plant's ability to host both pests and beneficials makes it potentially useful to maintain stable populations of insects used for biological control in other cultures, like Campylomma verbasci and Dicyphus hesperus (Miridae), a predator of whiteflies. A number of pest Lepidoptera species, including the stalk borer (Papaipema nebris) and gray hairstreak (Strymon melinus), also use V. thapsus as a host plant.

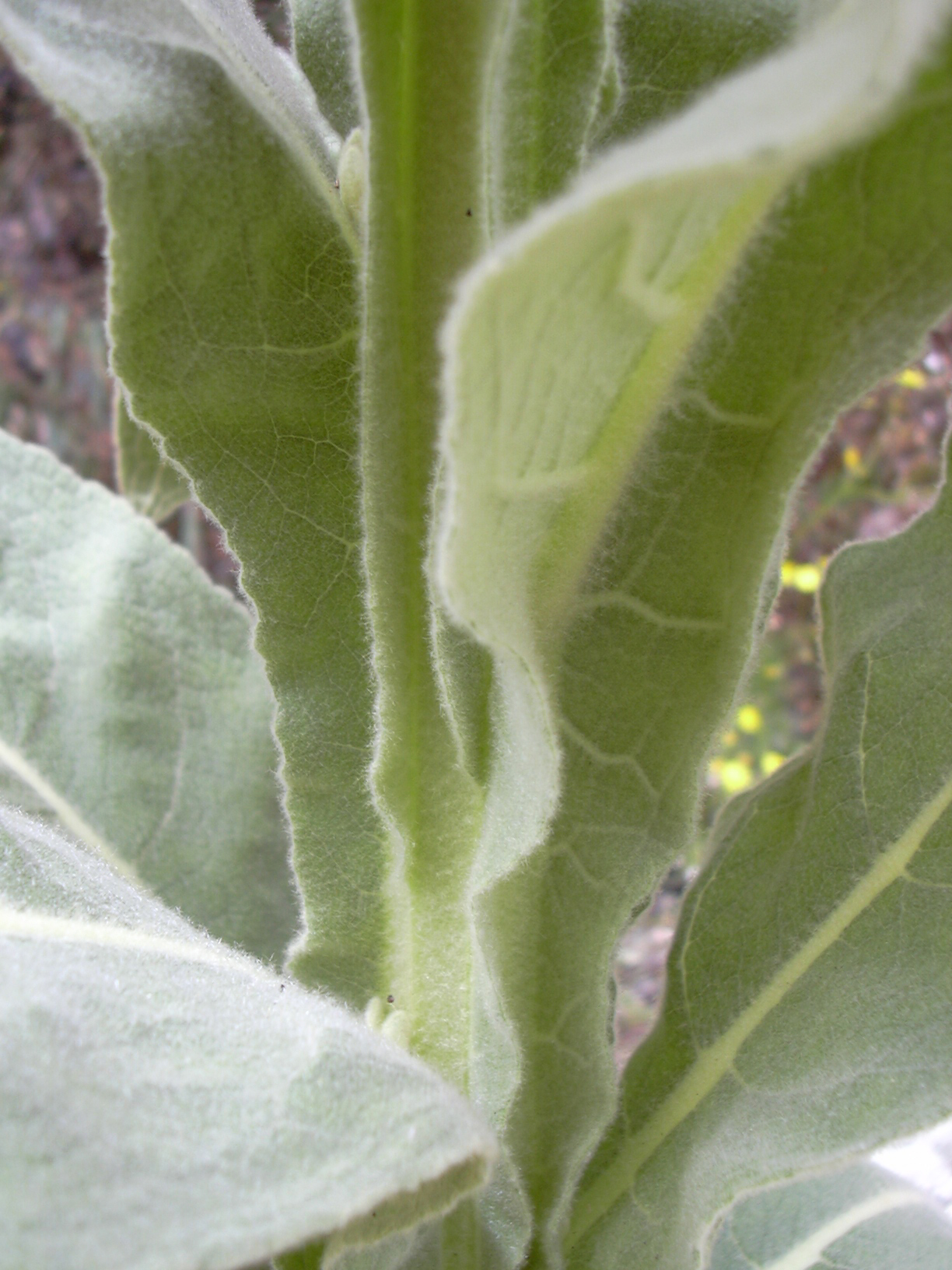
Because of ample irritating hair, V. thapsus is resistant to grazing and contact herbicides.

Control of the plant, when desired, is best managed via mechanical means, such as hand pulling and hoeing, preferably followed by sowing of native plants. Animals rarely graze it because of its irritating hairs, and liquid herbicides require surfactants to be effective, as the hair causes water to roll off the plant, much like the lotus effect. Burning is ultimately ineffective, as it only creates new bare areas for seedlings to occupy. G. tetrum and Cucullia verbasci usually have little effect on V. thapsus populations as a whole. Goats and chickens have also been proposed to control mullein. Effective (when used with a surfactant) contact herbicides include glyphosate, triclopyr and sulfurometuron-methyl. Ground herbicides, like tebuthiuron, are also effective, but they result in bare ground – ideal conditions for growing more mullein – and therefore require repeated application to prevent regrowth.

== Uses ==
=== Phytochemicals ===
Phytochemicals in V. thapsus flowers and leaves include saponins, polysaccharides, mucilage, flavonoids, tannins, iridoid and lignin glycosides, and essential oils. The plant's leaves, in addition to the seeds, have been reported to contain rotenone, although quantities are unknown.

=== Traditional medicine ===
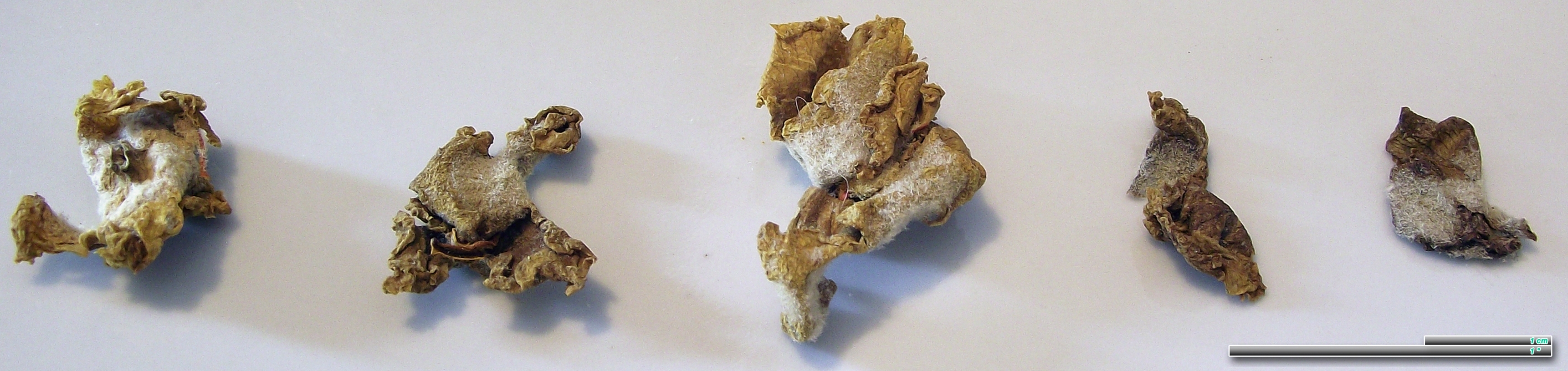
"Verbasci flos": dried flowers of V. thapsus as used in herbal tea

Although long used in herbal medicine, no drugs are manufactured from its components. Dioscorides first recommended the plant 2000 years ago, considering it useful as a folk medicine for pulmonary diseases. Leaves were smoked to attempt to treat lung ailments, a tradition that in America was rapidly transmitted to Native American peoples. The Zuni people, however, use the plant in poultices of powdered root applied to sores, rashes, and skin infections. An infusion of the root is also used to treat athlete's foot. All preparations meant to be drunk have to be finely filtered to eliminate the irritating hairs.

Oil from the flowers was used against catarrhs, colics, earaches, frostbite, eczema, and other external conditions. Topical application of various V. thapsus-based preparations was recommended for the treatment of warts, boils, carbuncles, hemorrhoids, and chilblains, amongst others. Glycyrrhizin compounds with bactericide effects in vitro were isolated from flowers. The German Commission E describes uses of the plant for respiratory infections. It was also part of the National Formulary in the United States and United Kingdom.

The plant has been used in an attempt to treat colds, croup, sunburn, and other skin irritations.

=== Other uses ===
Roman soldiers are said to have dipped the plant stalks in grease for use as torches. Other cultures use the leaves as wicks. Native Americans and American colonists lined their shoes with leaves from the plant to keep out the cold.

Mullein may be cultivated as an ornamental plant. As with many plants, (Pliny the Elder described it in his Naturalis Historia), (Note: In book 25, Pliny describes "two principal kinds [of verbascum]" thought to be V. thapsus and V. sinuatum. The precise attribution of a third kind is unclear.) great mullein was linked to witches, although the relationship remained generally ambiguous, and the plant was also widely held to ward off curses and evil spirits. The seeds contain several compounds (saponins, glycosides, coumarin, rotenone) that are toxic to fish, and have been widely used as piscicide for fishing.

Due to its weedy capacities, the plant, unlike other species of the genus (such as V. phoeniceum), is not often cultivated.

== Gallery ==

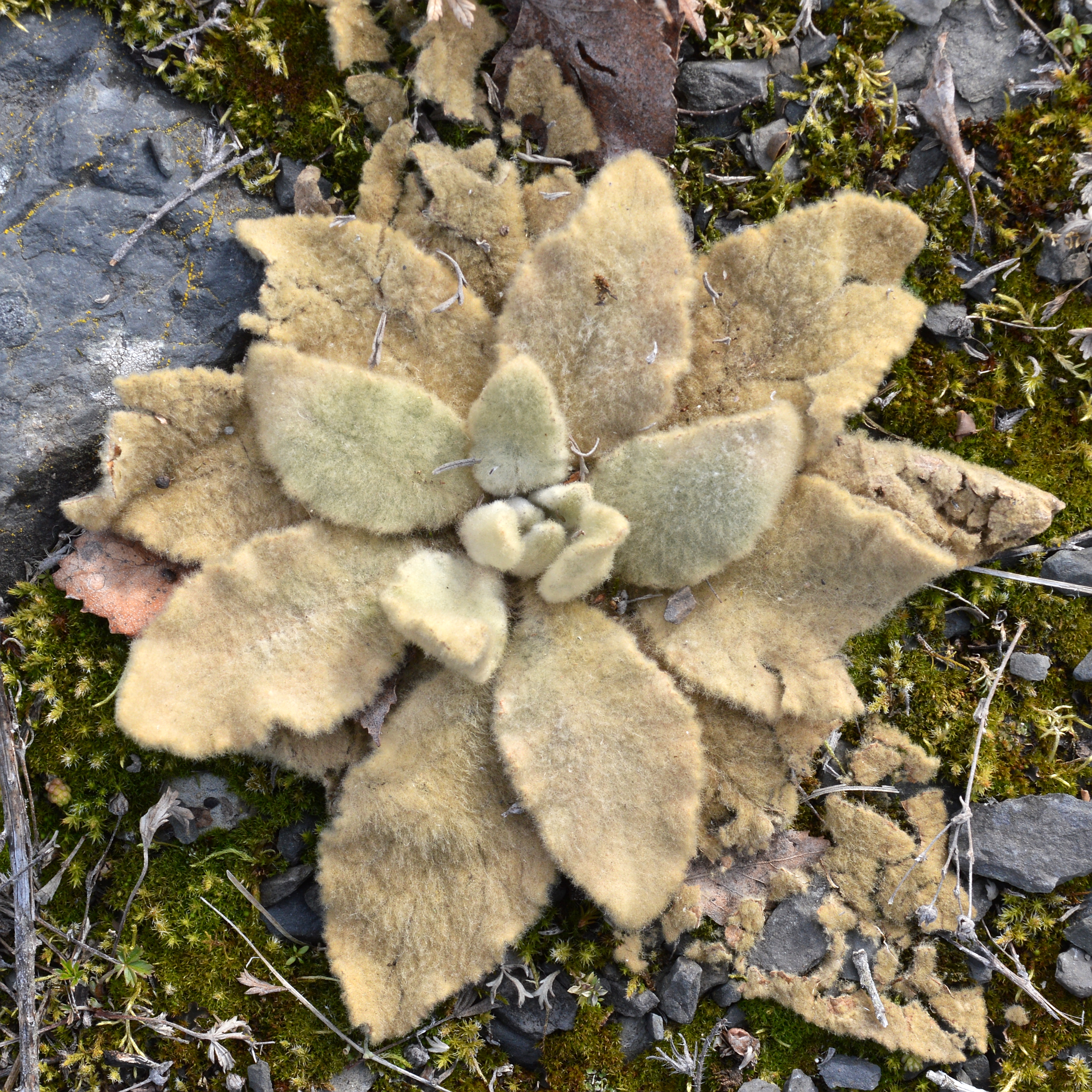

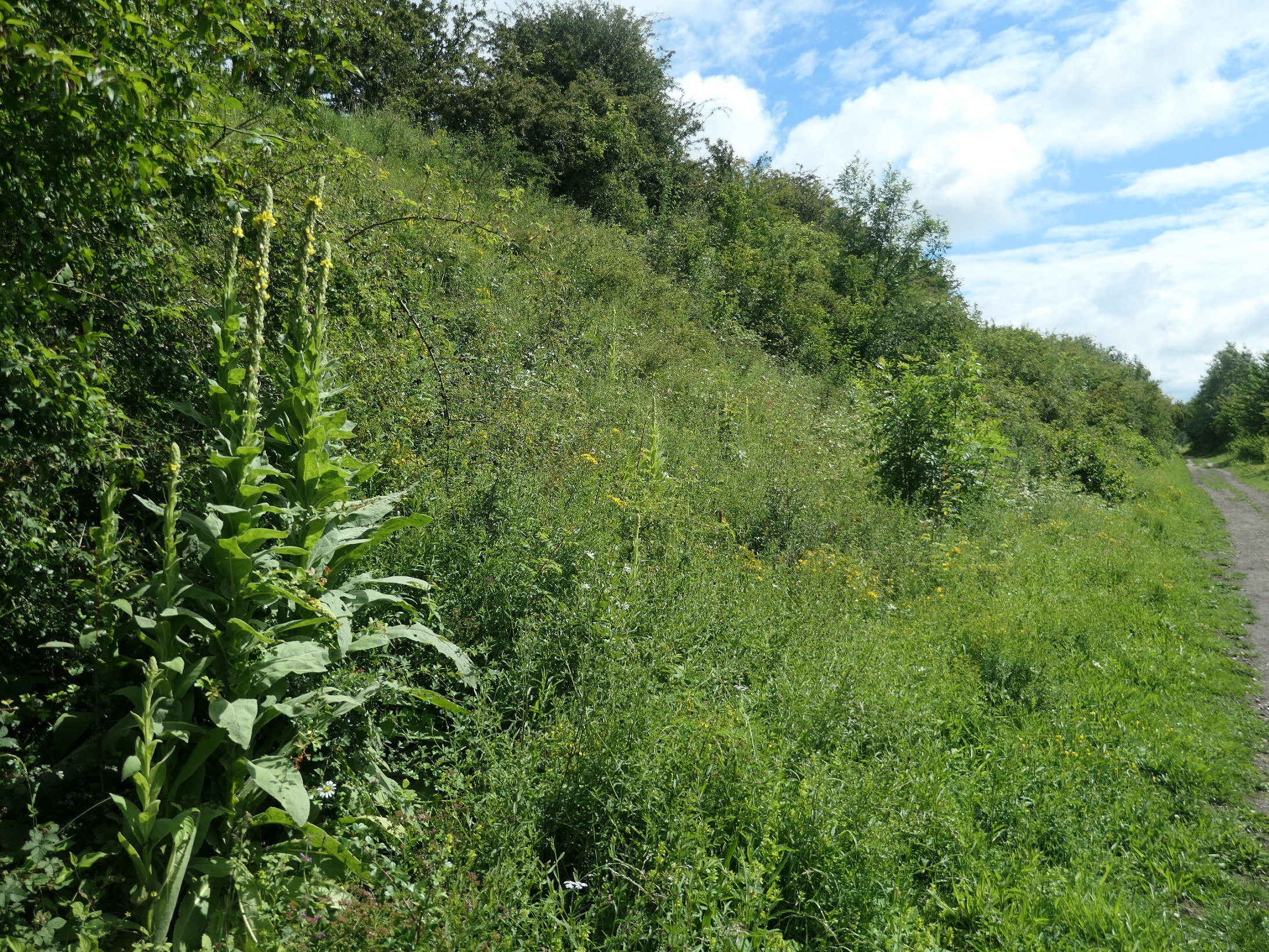

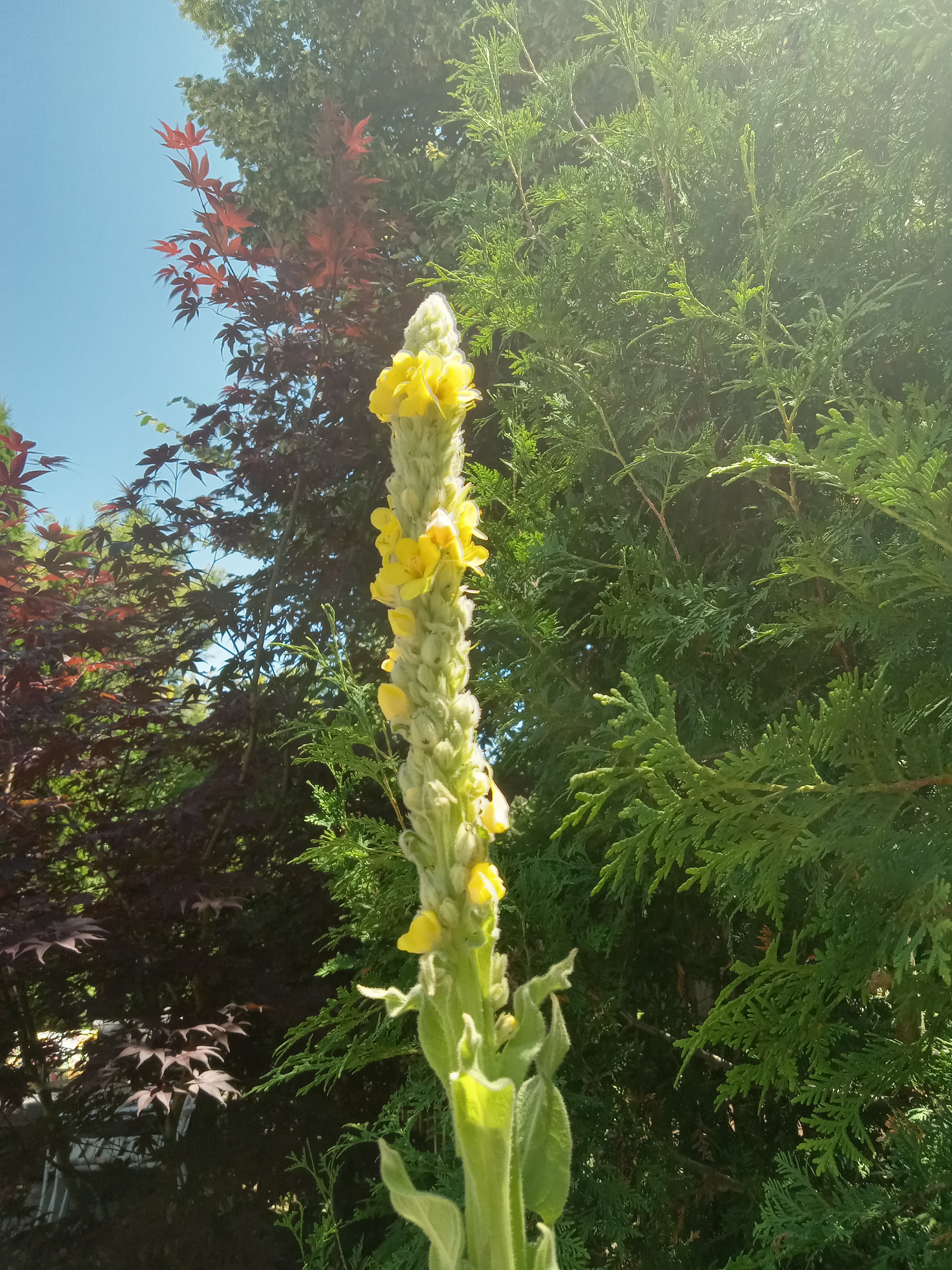
