= Shargacucullia barthae =

Scientific classification
- Kingdom: Animalia
- Phylum: Arthropoda
- Class: Insecta
- Order: Lepidoptera
- Superfamily: Noctuoidea
- Family: Noctuidae
- Genus: Shargacucullia
- Species: S. barthae

Binomial name
- Shargacucullia barthae (Boursin, 1933)

Species of moth

Shargacucullia barthae is a moth of the family Noctuidae first described by Boursin in 1933. It is found in Turkey, Iraq, Iran and the Near East.

Adults are on wing from March to April. There is one generation per year.

The larvae feed on Scrophularia species.
