= Shargacucullia =

Scientific classification
- Domain: Eukaryota
- Kingdom: Animalia
- Phylum: Arthropoda
- Class: Insecta
- Order: Lepidoptera
- Superfamily: Noctuoidea
- Family: Noctuidae
- Subfamily: Cuculliinae
- Genus: Shargacucullia; Ronkay & Ronkay, 1992

Genus of moths

Shargacucullia is a genus of moths of the family Noctuidae.

== Species ==
- Shargacucullia anceps (Staudinger, 1881)
- Shargacucullia armena (Ronkay & Ronkay, 1987)
- Shargacucullia barthae (Boursin, 1933)
- Shargacucullia blattariae (Esper, 1790)
- Shargacucullia brevipennis (Hampson, 1984)
- Shargacucullia canariensis (Pinker, 1969)
- Shargacucullia caninae (Rambur, 1833)
- Shargacucullia celsiphaga (Boursin, 1940)
- Shargacucullia erythrocephala (Wagner, 1914)
- Shargacucullia eugrapha (Boursin, 1942)
- Shargacucullia falcata (Ronkay & Ronkay, 1987)
- Shargacucullia faucicola (Wiltshire, 1943)
- Shargacucullia gozmanyi Ronkay & Ronkay, 1994
- Shargacucullia kasyi (Wiltshire, 1976)
- Shargacucullia lychnitis (Rambur, 1833)
- Shargacucullia macewani (Wiltshire, 1949)
- Shargacucullia mediogrisea (Warren, 1911)
- Shargacucullia naumanni (Ronkay & Ronkay, 1992)
- Shargacucullia notodontina (Boursin, 1934)
- Shargacucullia osthelderi (Boursin, 1933)
- Shargacucullia prenanthis (Boisduval, 1840)
- Shargacucullia reisseri (Boursin, 1933)
- Shargacucullia scrophulariphaga (Rambur, 1833)
- Shargacucullia scrophulariphila (Staudinger, 1859)
- Shargacucullia scrophulariae (Denis & Schiffermüller, 1775)
- Shargacucullia sinopsis (Boursin, 1942)
- Shargacucullia stigmatophora (Hampson, 1894)
- Shargacucullia strigicosta (Boursin, 1940)
- Shargacucullia thapsiphaga (Treitschke, 1826)
- Shargacucullia tropicarabica (Wiltshire, 1949)
- Shargacucullia verbasci (Linnaeus, 1758)
- Shargacucullia xylophana (Boursin, 1934)
- Shargacucullia zerkowitzi (Boursin, 1934)

== Shargacucullia Gallery ==
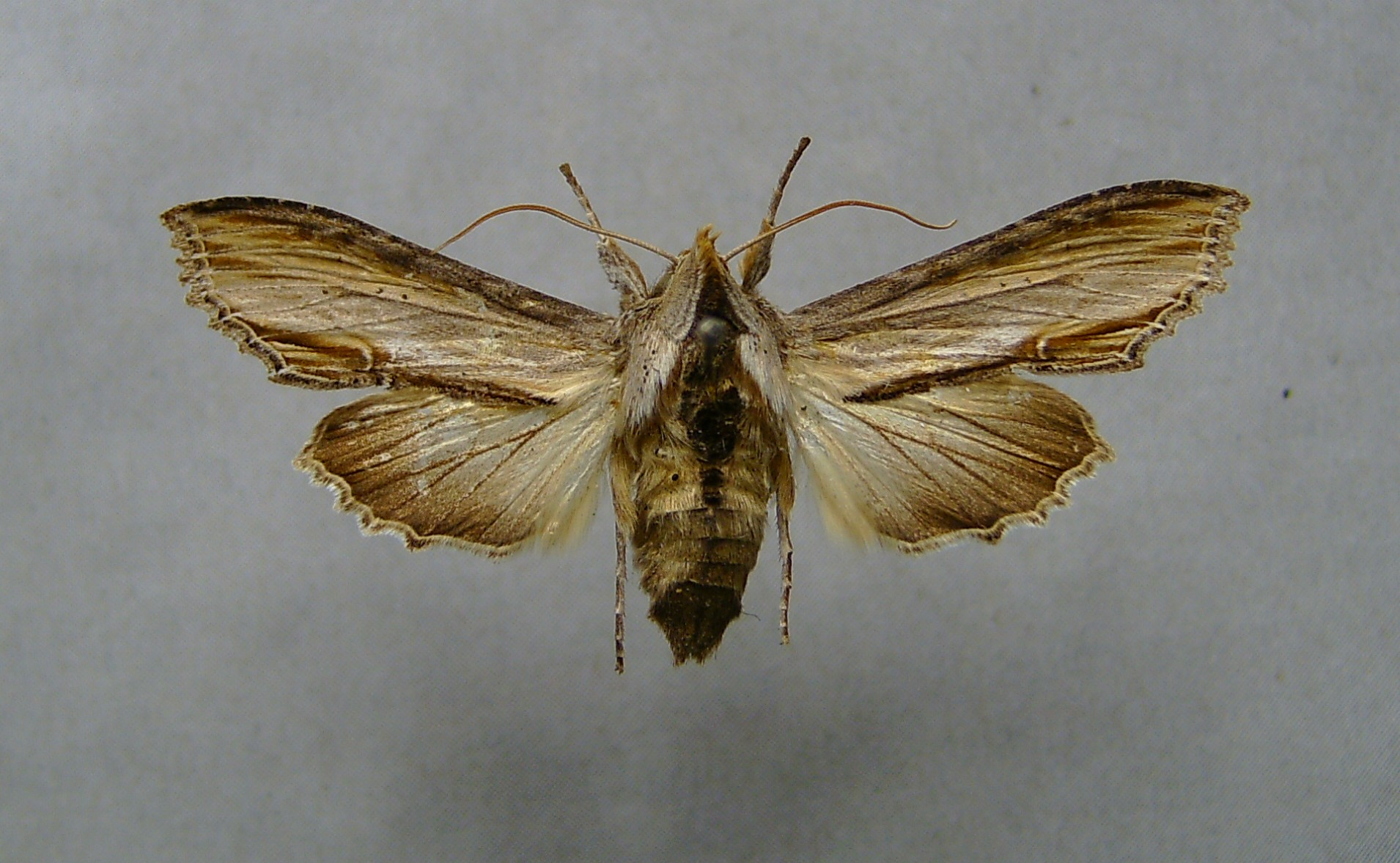
Shargacucullia scrophulariae

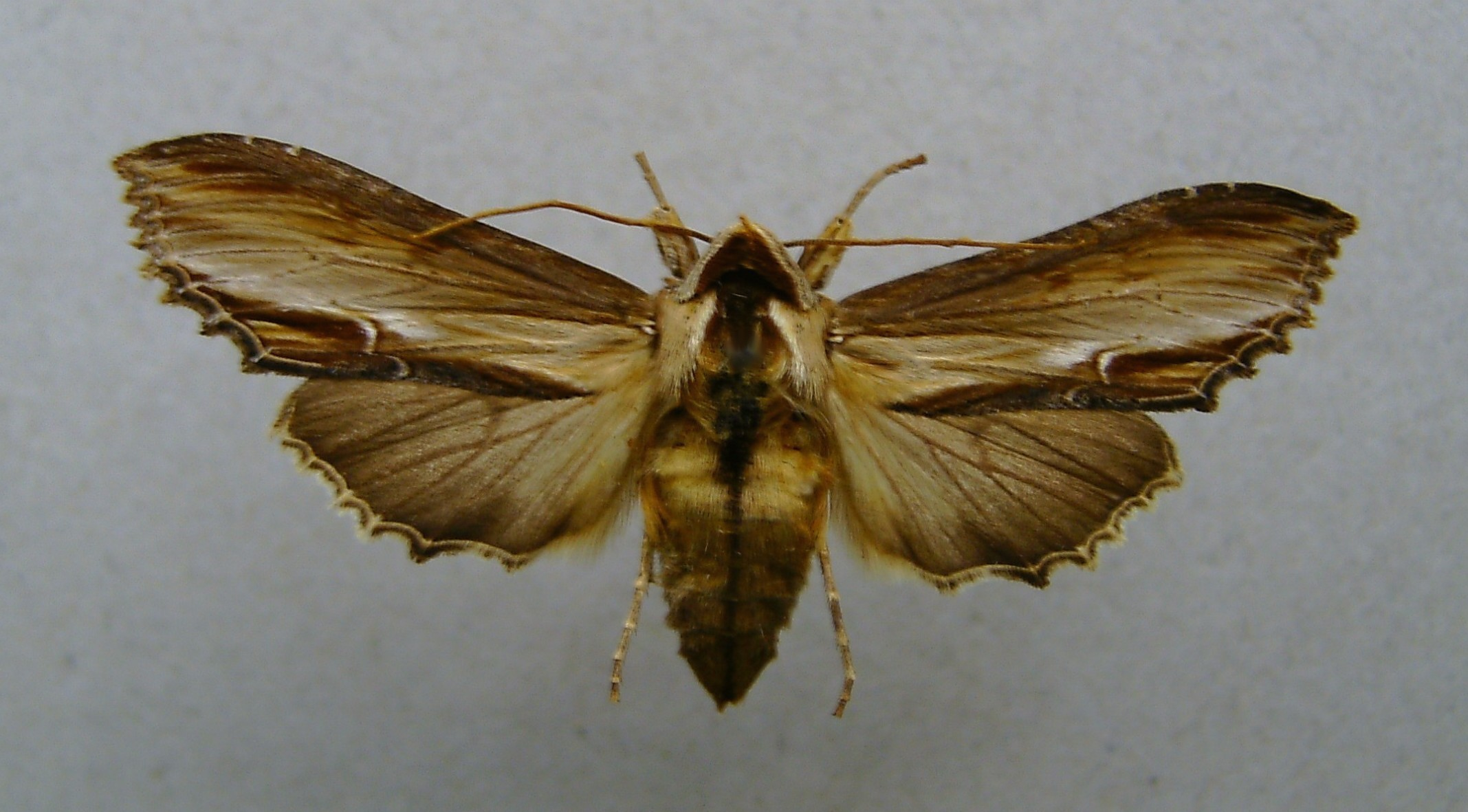
Shargacucullia verbasci

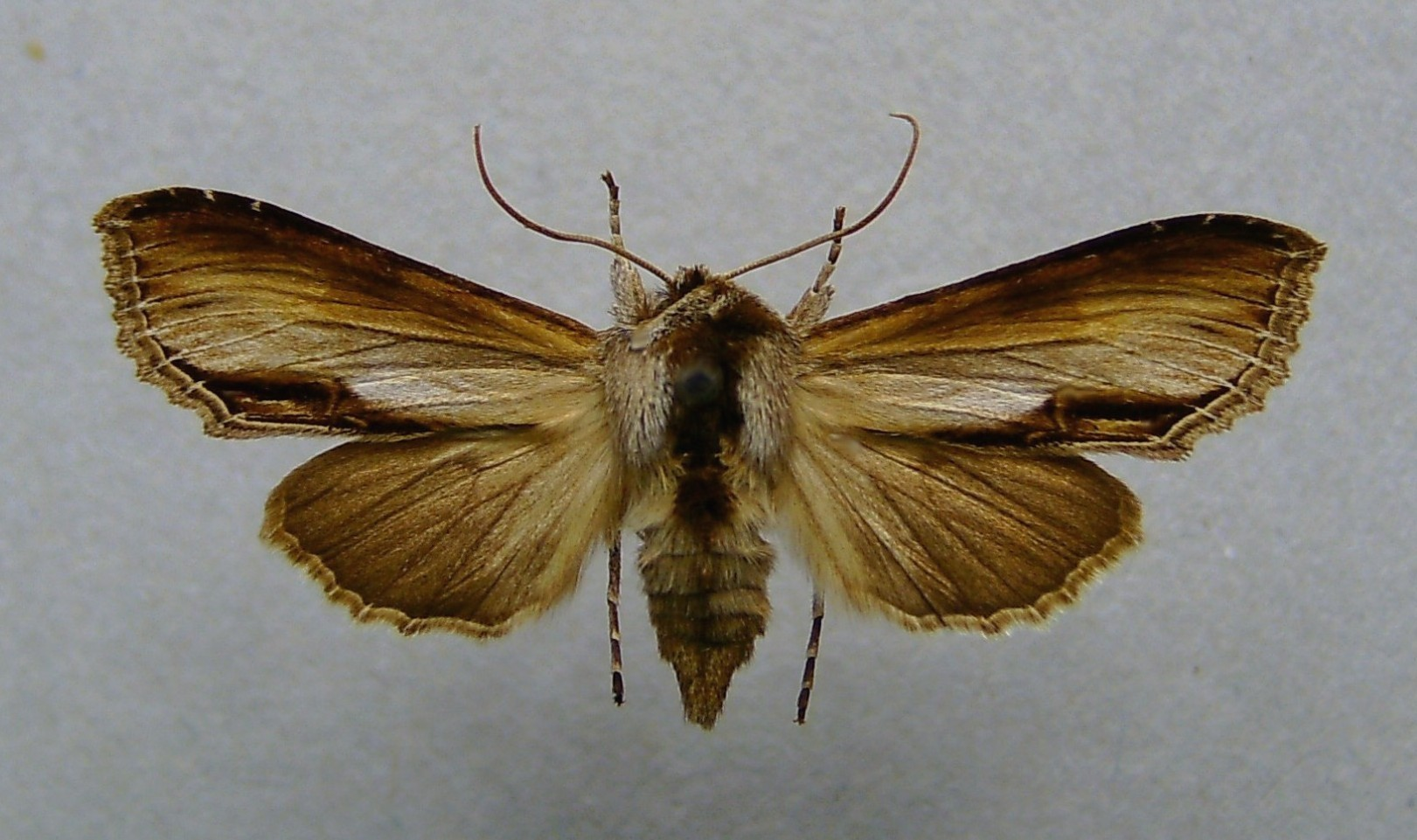
Shargacucullia prenanthis

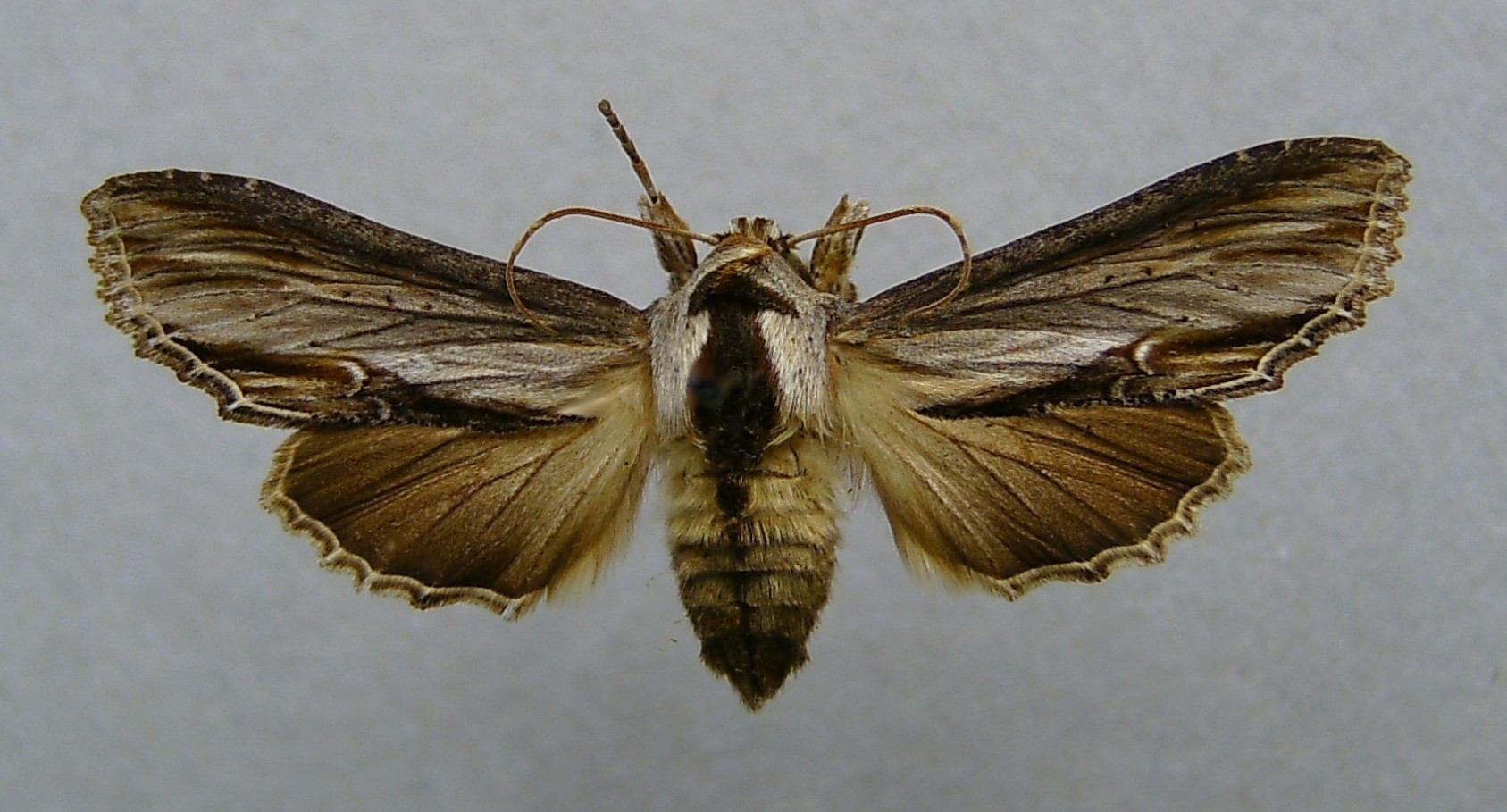
Shargacucullia blattariae

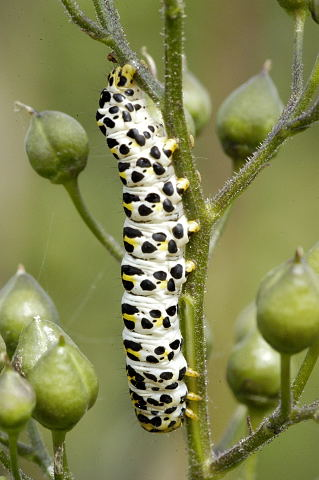
Shargacucullia scrophulariae

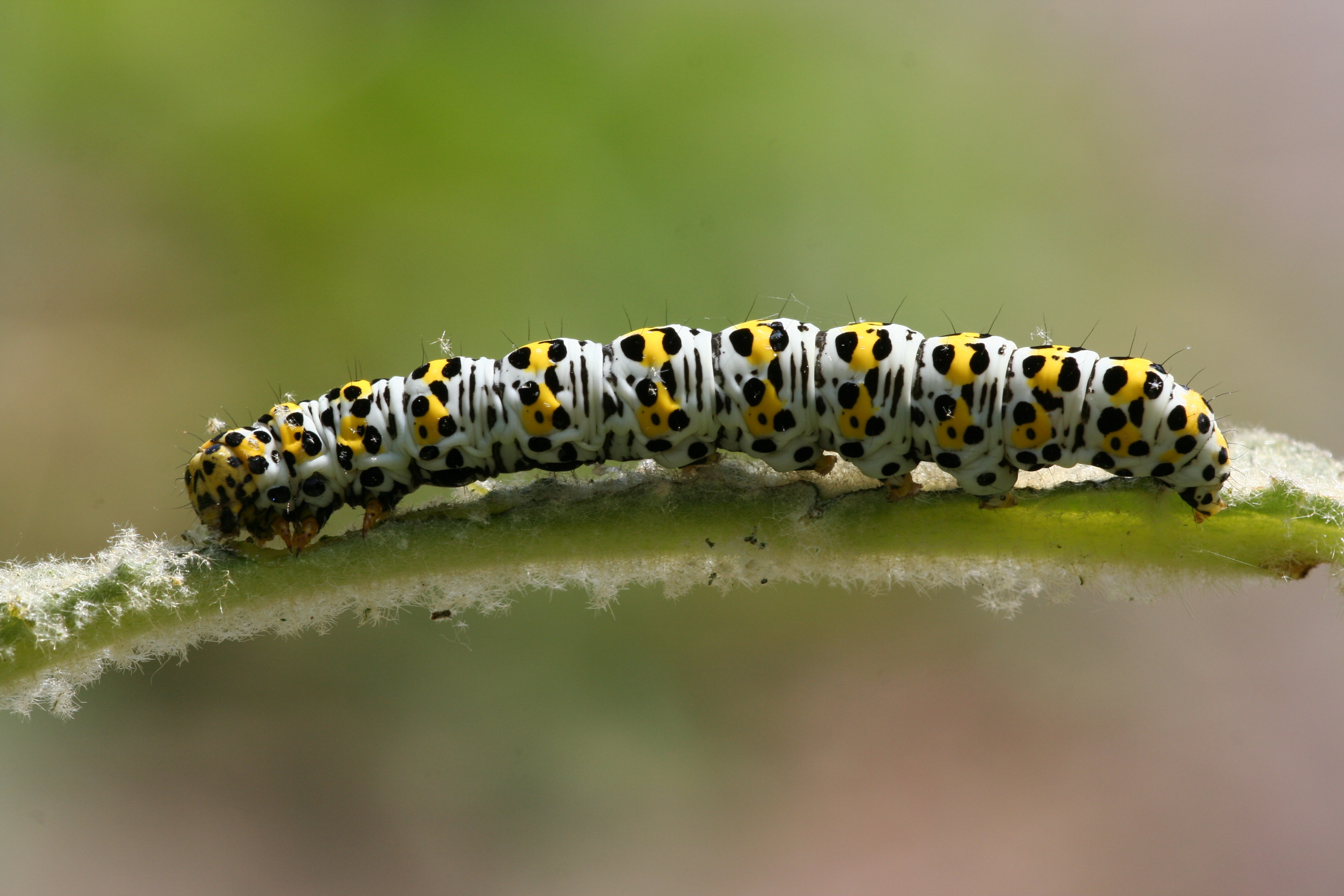
Shargacucullia verbasci
