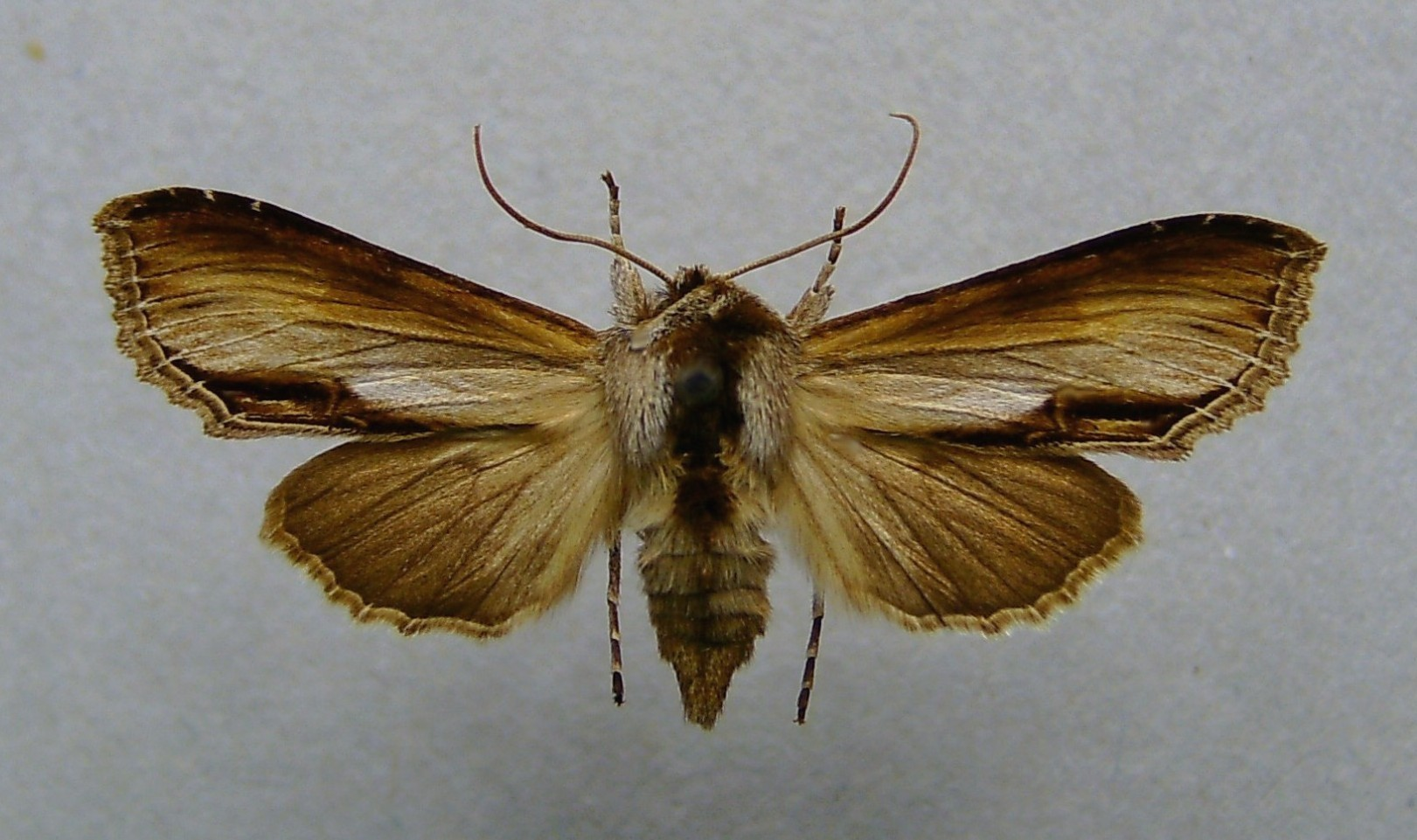

Scientific classification
- Kingdom: Animalia
- Phylum: Arthropoda
- Class: Insecta
- Order: Lepidoptera
- Superfamily: Noctuoidea
- Family: Noctuidae
- Genus: Shargacucullia
- Species: S. prenanthis

Binomial name
- Shargacucullia prenanthis (Boisduval, 1840)

Synonyms
- Cucullia prenanthis Boisduval, 1840

= Shargacucullia prenanthis =

Species of moth

Shargacucullia prenanthis, the false water betony, is a moth of the family Noctuidae. It is found from south-eastern France, through the Alps and bordering mountains east to Romania and Bulgaria. It is also found in Anatolia and Lebanon.

== Technical description and variation ==
C. prenanthis Bsd. (= ceramanthea Frr.) (27 i). Forewing violaceous grey, outer half of costal area shaded darker; lower half of submedian fold before the outer line broadly streaked with whitish; stigmata entirely absent; a black streak along inner margin to outer line, and a broader black streak beyond it below vein 2, continued as a fine marginal line to apex and cut by the whiter veins; a row of dark streaks from apex to vein 6; hindwing brown in both sexes, though often paler in the male. Larva green; dorsal and subdorsal lines yellow, spiracular line white; head green; tubercles yellowish white. The wingspan is 37–43 mm.

== Biology ==
Adults are on wing from April to June. There is one generation per year. The larvae feed on Scrophularia species, including Scrophularia nodosa first on the flowers and seeds, then on the leaves
