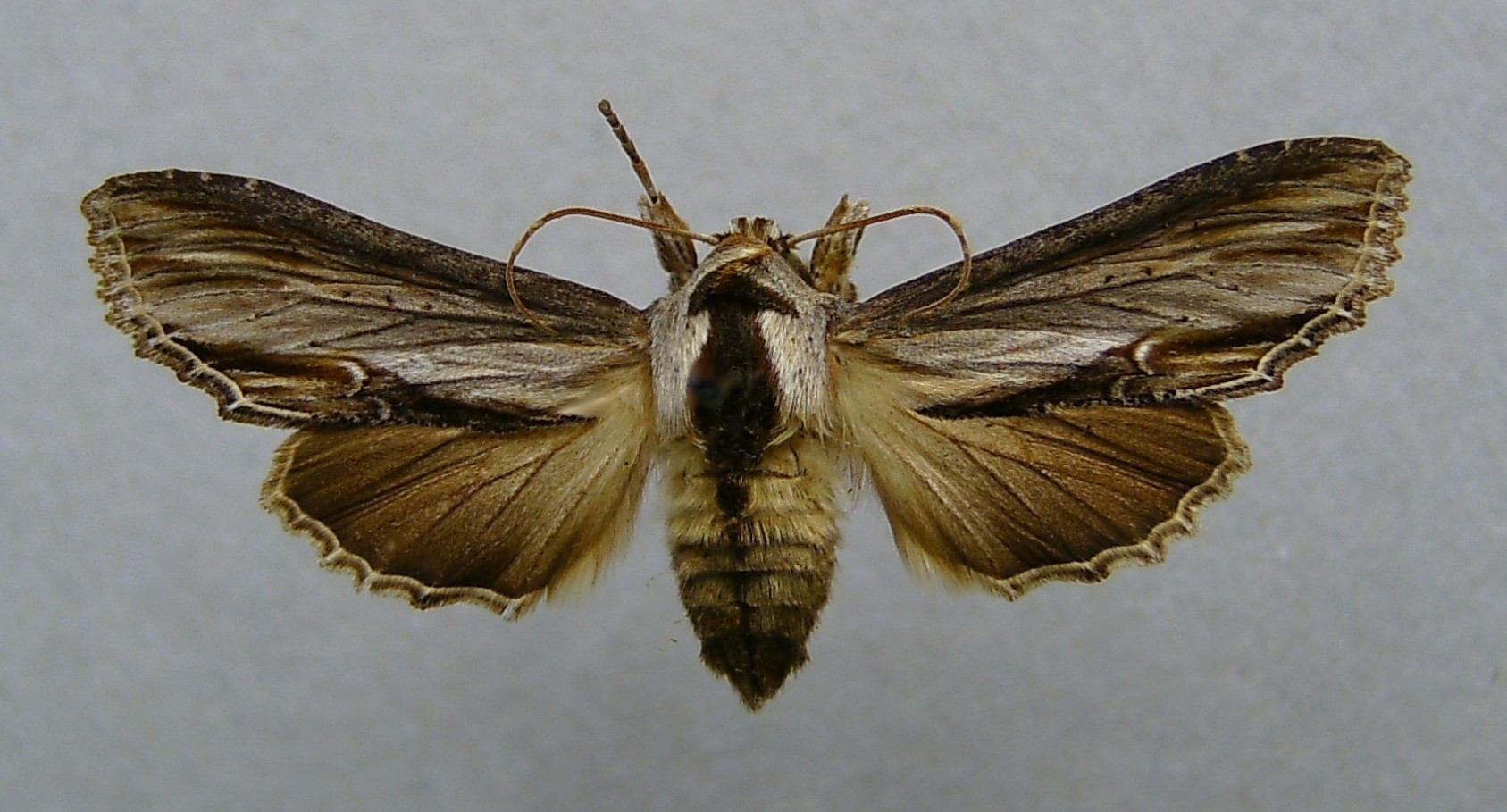

Scientific classification
- Kingdom: Animalia
- Phylum: Arthropoda
- Class: Insecta
- Order: Lepidoptera
- Superfamily: Noctuoidea
- Family: Noctuidae
- Genus: Shargacucullia
- Species: S. blattariae

Binomial name
- Shargacucullia blattariae (Esper, 1790)

Synonyms
- Noctua blattariae Esper, 1790; Noctua blattariae Esper, 1804; Noctua minogenica Rebel, 1920; Noctua eugeniae Beck, 1989

= Shargacucullia blattariae =

Species of moth

Shargacucullia blattariae is a moth of the family Noctuidae. The species was first described by Eugenius Johann Christoph Esper in 1790. It is found in south-eastern Europe, the Near East, Israel and Jordan.

Adults are on wing from April to May. There is one generation per year.

The larvae feed on Scrophularia species, including Scrophularia canina.
