= Shargacucullia strigicosta =

Scientific classification
- Domain: Eukaryota
- Kingdom: Animalia
- Phylum: Arthropoda
- Class: Insecta
- Order: Lepidoptera
- Superfamily: Noctuoidea
- Family: Noctuidae
- Genus: Shargacucullia
- Species: S. strigicosta

Binomial name
- Shargacucullia strigicosta (Boursin, 1940)

Species of moth

Shargacucullia strigicosta is a moth of the family Noctuidae. The species was first described by Boursin in 1940. It is found in Iraq and the Sinai in Egypt. Recently it has also been recorded from Israel and some areas of Turkey, Azerbaijan and Iran.

Adults are on wing from January to March. There is one generation per year.

The larvae probably feed on Scrophularia species.
