= Shargacucullia macewani =

Scientific classification
- Kingdom: Animalia
- Phylum: Arthropoda
- Class: Insecta
- Order: Lepidoptera
- Superfamily: Noctuoidea
- Family: Noctuidae
- Genus: Shargacucullia
- Species: S. macewani

Binomial name
- Shargacucullia macewani (Wiltshire, 1949)

Species of moth

Shargacucullia macewani is a moth of the family Noctuidae first described by Wiltshire in 1949. It is endemic to south-western Arabia. It has been recorded in Saudi Arabia, Yemen and Israel.

Adults are on wing from January to February. There is one generation per year.

The larvae feed on Scrophularia hypericifolia.
