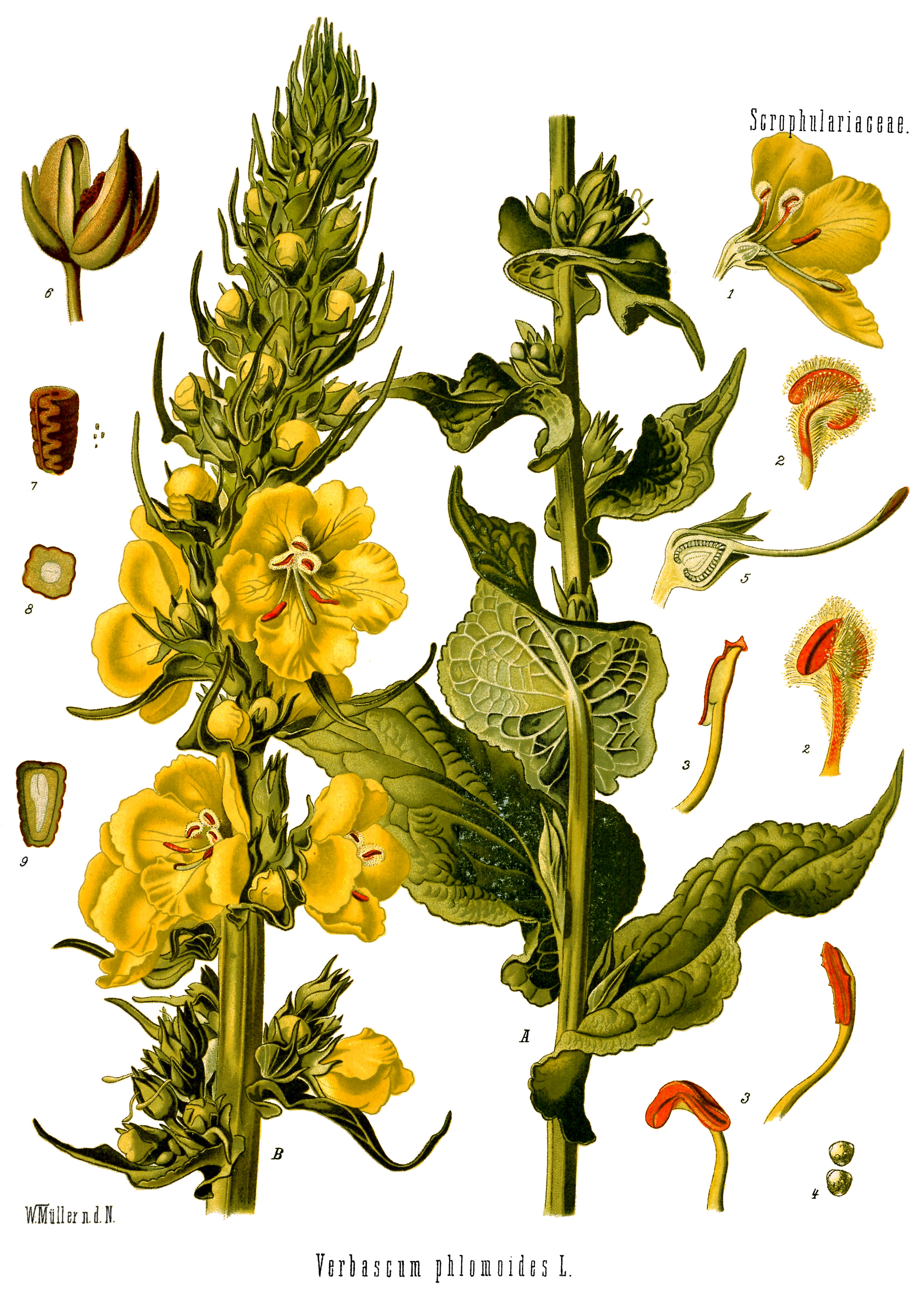
- Botanical illustration

Scientific classification
- Kingdom: Plantae
- Clade: Embryophytes
- Clade: Tracheophytes
- Clade: Angiosperms
- Clade: Eudicots
- Clade: Asterids
- Order: Lamiales
- Family: Scrophulariaceae
- Genus: Verbascum
- Species: V. phlomoides

Binomial name
- Verbascum phlomoides L.

Synonyms
- List: Flomosia condensata (Schrad.) Raf.; Flomosia nemarosa (Schrad.) Raf.; Flomosia phlomoides (L.) Raf.; Thapsus phlomoides (L.) Opiz; Verbascum argyrostachyon Ten.; Verbascum australe Schrad.; Verbascum avarorum Domin; Verbascum belasitzae Stoj. & Stef.; Verbascum boerhavii Frivald.; Verbascum boerhavii Frivald. ex Nym.; Verbascum bohemicum Borb.; Verbascum calvescens Schur; Verbascum condensatum Schrad.; Verbascum crenatifolium Solacolu, 1926; Verbascum foemina Garsault; Verbascum formanekii Formanek; Verbascum grandiflorum Mill.; Verbascum italicum Moric.; Verbascum jernacha Hochst.; Verbascum jernacha Hochst. ex Benth.; Verbascum macranthum Hoffmgg. & Link; Verbascum montanum Griseb.; Verbascum nemorosum Schrad.; Verbascum phlomoides subsp. australe (Schrad.) Nyman, 1881; Verbascum phlomoides subsp. australe Bonnier & Layens, 1894; Verbascum phlomoides var. avarorum Domin; Verbascum phlomoides var. condensatum (Schrad.) Rouy, 1909; Verbascum phlomoides var. macranthum; Verbascum phlomoides var. semidecurrens Mert. & W.D.J.Koch, 1831; Verbascum pulverulentum Spreng.; Verbascum pumilum Stoj. & Stef.; Verbascum rolletianum hort.; Verbascum rolletianum hort. ex Roem. & Schult.; Verbascum rugulosum Willd.; Verbascum sartori Hausskn., 1897; Verbascum saxatile Salisb.; Verbascum semidecurrens Kit.; Verbascum semidecurrens Kit. ex Nym.; Verbascum slavonicum Kit.; Verbascum slavonicum Kitt., 1828; Verbascum ternacha Hochst.; Verbascum thapsiforme subsp. phlomoides (L.) Corb., 1894; Verbascum thapsoides Vill.; Verbascum tomentosum Lam.; Verbascum viminale Guss.

= Verbascum phlomoides =

Species of flowering plant

Verbascum phlomoides, the orange mullein, woolly mullein (which often refers to Verbascum thapsus), or clasping-leaf mullein (Note: The book reference by Elaine Nowick uses the word "mullen" instead of "mullein" twice in the common name. This is likely not a typo but an outdated use.), is a plant species in the family Scrophulariaceae native to Europe and Asia Minor. It is a widespread weed in North America. The Royal Horticultural Society considered it to be a good plant to attract pollinators. It is used as a respiratory catarrh and diuretic.
