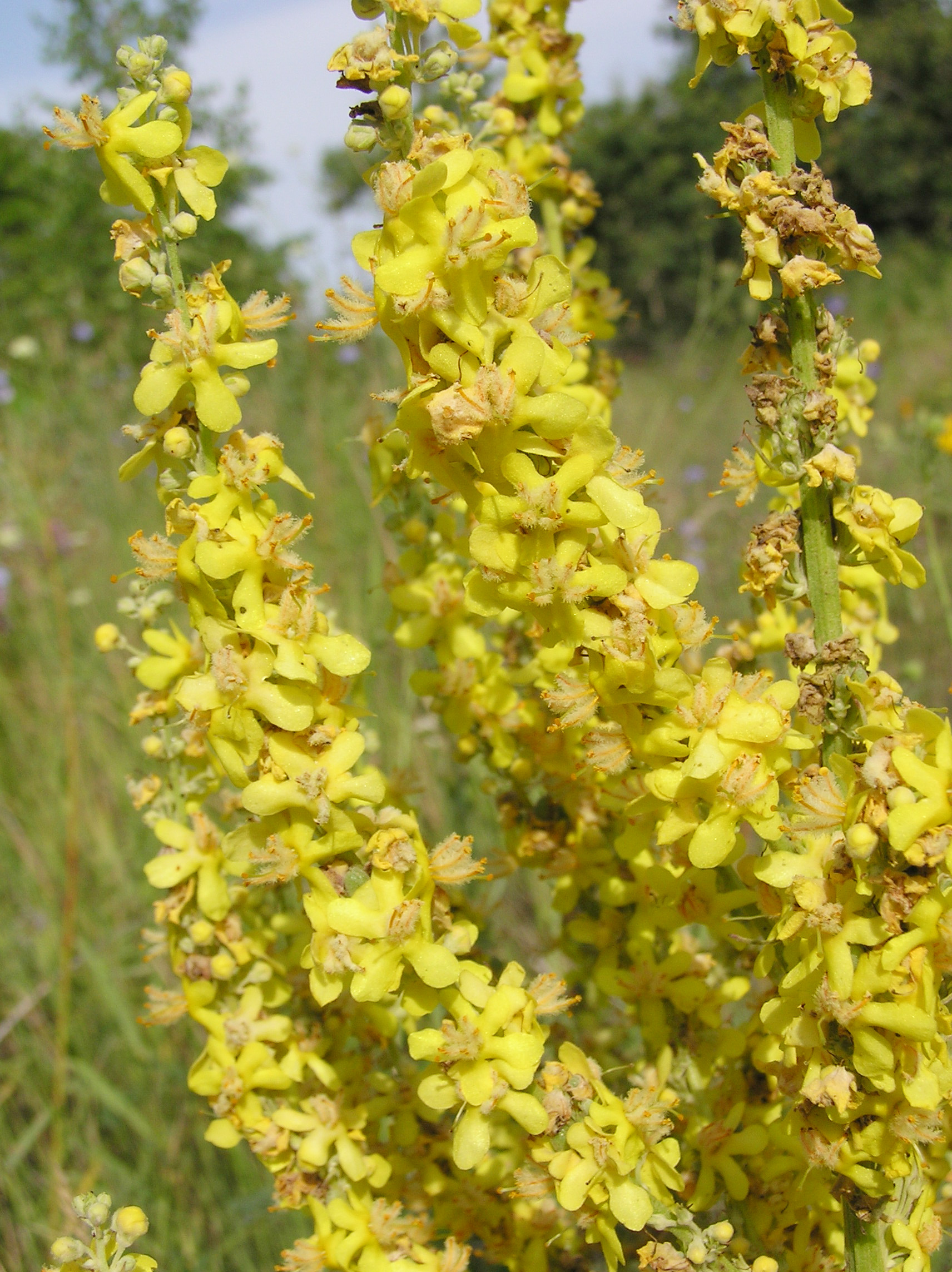
- In Russia

Scientific classification
- Kingdom: Plantae
- Clade: Tracheophytes
- Clade: Angiosperms
- Clade: Eudicots
- Clade: Asterids
- Order: Lamiales
- Family: Scrophulariaceae
- Genus: Verbascum
- Species: V. lychnitis

Binomial name
- Verbascum lychnitis L.

Synonyms
- List: Veronica biebersteinii (Besser) Hassk.; Blattaria alba Medik.; Lychnitis alba Fourr.; Lychnitis lutea Fourr.; Thapsus lychnitis (L.) Raf.; Verbascum album Mill.; Verbascum biebersteinii Besser; Verbascum bracteatum J.Presl & C.Presl; Verbascum firmum Dulac; Verbascum leucanthemum Dufour ex Gren. & Godr.; Verbascum lychnitideum St.-Lag.; Verbascum lychnitis f. album House; Verbascum lychnitis f. rochelianum Soó; Verbascum micranthum Moretti; Verbascum parvoflore Gilib.; Verbascum pulverulentum Salisb.; Verbascum ramosissimum Poir.; Verbascum repandum Rochel; Verbascum rhombifolium Stokes; Verbascum sylvestre Bubani; Verbascum weldenii F.Braun ex Moretti

= Verbascum lychnitis =

Species of plant

Verbascum lychnitis, the white mullein, is a flowering plant in the figwort family (Scrophulariaceae) native to Asia and Europe. It has naturalized in parts of North America. The species was first formally named by Carl Linnaeus in 1753. Despite its common name, the flowers can be white or yellow.

It is a biennial or short-lived perennial commonly found in disturbed areas.

Verbascum lychnitis can be distinguished from other species in the genus Verbascum by the sessile and non-clasping stem leaves with upper and lower surfaces differing in color; small, flowers that are separated (not as tightly bunched together as other mulleins); and the somewhat long flower stalks. As with other Mulleins the leaves are clothed with dendritic hairs. In V. lychnitis, the hairs are very short, less than 0.2 mm, so as to appear stellate. The lower surface is much hairier than the upper.

It hybridizes with other mullein species, including V.nigrum, V.pulverentum and V.thapsus.

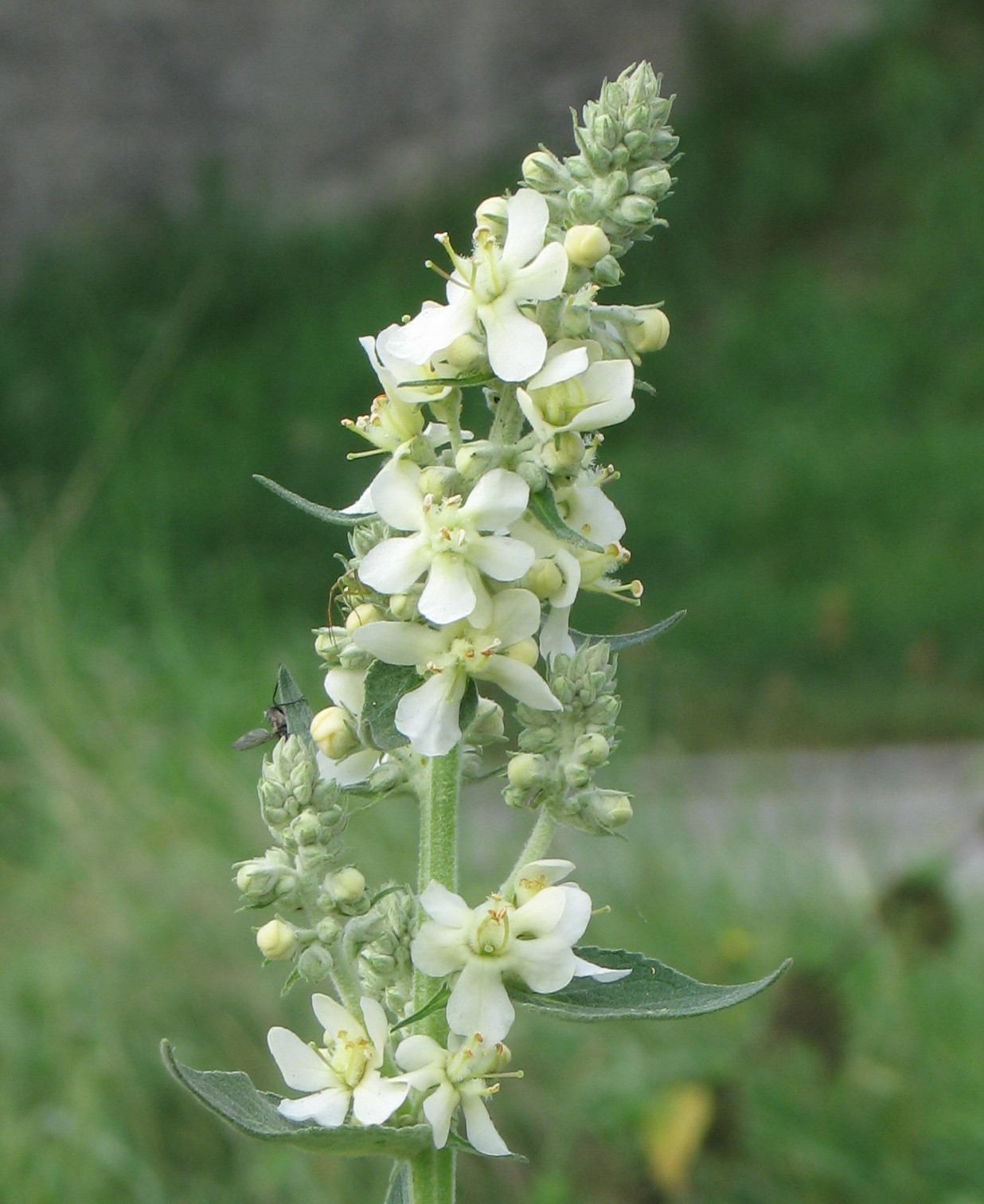
In Germany

== Additional Bibliography ==
- Cullen, James (2011). "Verbascum". In James Cullen; Sabina Knees (eds.). Boraginaceae to Compositae. European Garden Flora. Vol. V (2 ed.). Cambridge University Press. p. 180. ISBN 978-0-521-76164-2.
- T.G.Tutin; V. H. Heywood; N. A. Burges; D. M. Moore; D. H. Valentine; S. M. Walters; D. A. Webb, eds. (1972). "Verbascum". Diapensiaceae to Myoporaceae. Flora Europea. Vol. 3 (1 ed.). Cambridge University Press. ISBN 978-0-521-08489-5.
- Ellenberg, Heinz; Leutscher, Christoph (2010). Vegetation Mitteleuropas mit den Alpen (6 ed.). Ulmer Verlag UTB. p. 832. ISBN 978-3-8252-8104-5.
- Leslie, Alan (2019). Flora of Cambridgeshire. Peterborough, UK: Royal Horticultural Society. ISBN 978-1-907057-99-1.
- Prof. Dr.Eckehart J. Jaeger; Dr. Klaus Werner, eds. (2005). Gefasspflanze: Kritischer Band. Rothmaler: Exkursionsflora von Deutschland. Vol. 4 (10 ed.). Spektrum Verlag. p. 567. ISBN 3-8274-1496-2.
