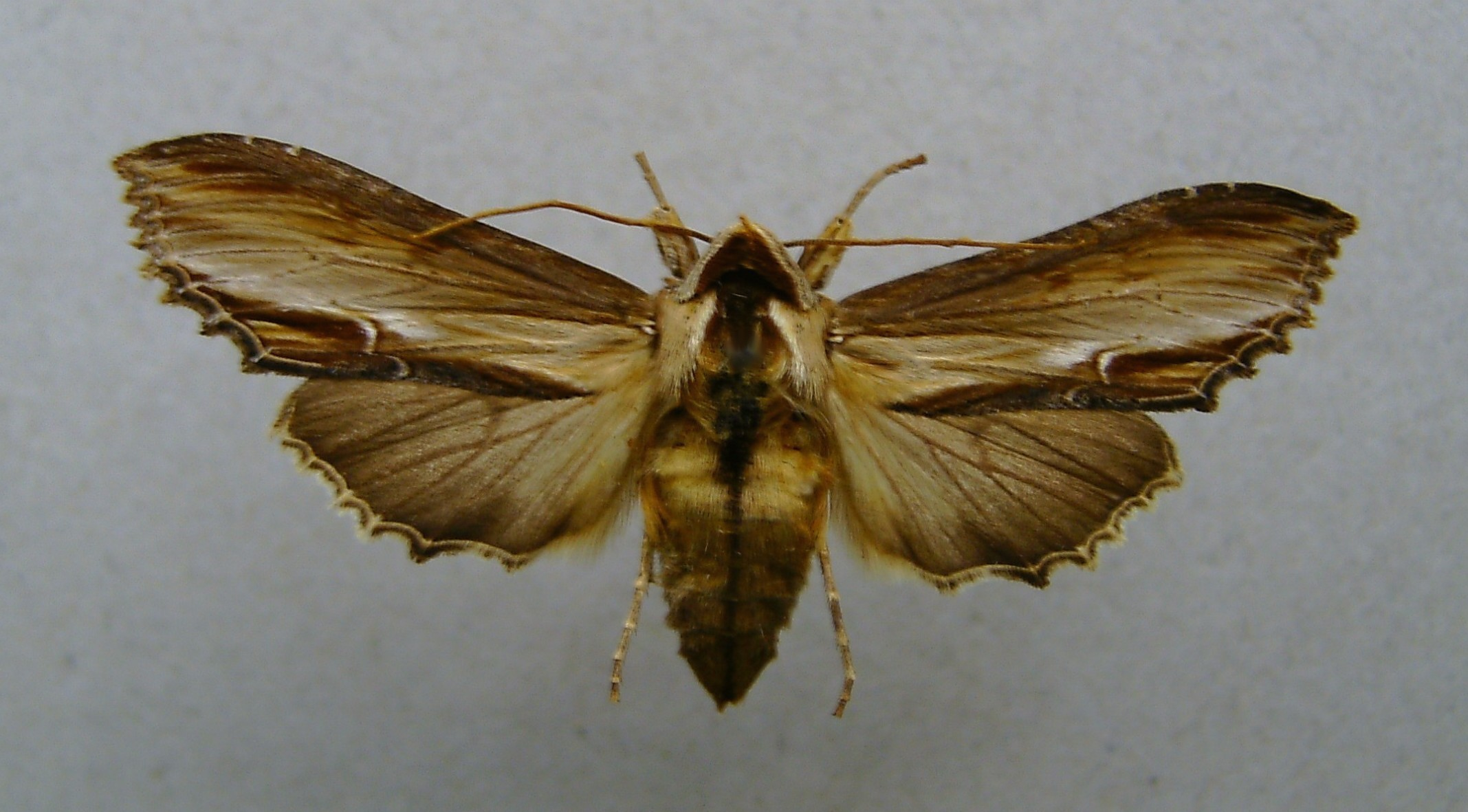

Scientific classification
- Kingdom: Animalia
- Phylum: Arthropoda
- Class: Insecta
- Order: Lepidoptera
- Superfamily: Noctuoidea
- Family: Noctuidae
- Genus: Cucullia
- Species: C. verbasci

Binomial name
- Cucullia verbasci (Linnaeus, 1758)

Synonyms
- Shargacucullia verbasci (Linnaeus, 1758)

= Mullein moth =

Species of moth

The mullein moth (Cucullia verbasci) is a noctuid moth with a Palearctic distribution. The species was first described by Carl Linnaeus in his landmark 1758 10th edition of Systema Naturae.

== Description ==
The forewing is broad (for the genus) and brownish ochreous; the costal streak and those preceding and following the lower part of outer line are a deep red brown; the lunules following the line are white and conspicuous; the space below median paler, becoming almost whitish above the outer dark brown streak; the stigmata are marked by dark brown spots; a row of deep brown streaks from apex to vein 6, and another, more faint, from below the apex to the end of cell. The hindwing of the male is whitish, with dark veins and cellspot, becoming diffusely fuscous along the termen; in the female it is darker throughout.

The larva is creamy with black and yellow spots.

== Similar species ==
Cucullia verbasci is difficult to certainly distinguish from these congeners.

- Shargacucullia scrophulariae (Denis & Schiffermüller, 1775)
- Shargacucullia lychnitis (Rambur, 1833)

== Range ==
It is found in western, southern and central Europe and North Africa. However, there are only individual finds from Denmark and southern Estonia in the north. The eastern presence extends to western Afghanistan. It is also found in Israel and Turkey. In the Alps, it lives up to an altitude of 1,600 metres (5,200 ft).

== Status ==
The Mullein moth mainly occupies dry and warm places, such as scrublands, dry grasslands, on rocky slopes, and on steppes, as well as parks and gardens.

The moth's caterpillar completely strips the leaves of the host plant and can be a horticultural pest. When threatened, the caterpillar freezes and may vomit.

== Life cycle ==
=== Egg ===
Eggs are laid singly on the under-surface of leaves of food plants. Initially white, they turn grey before hatching.

=== Larva ===
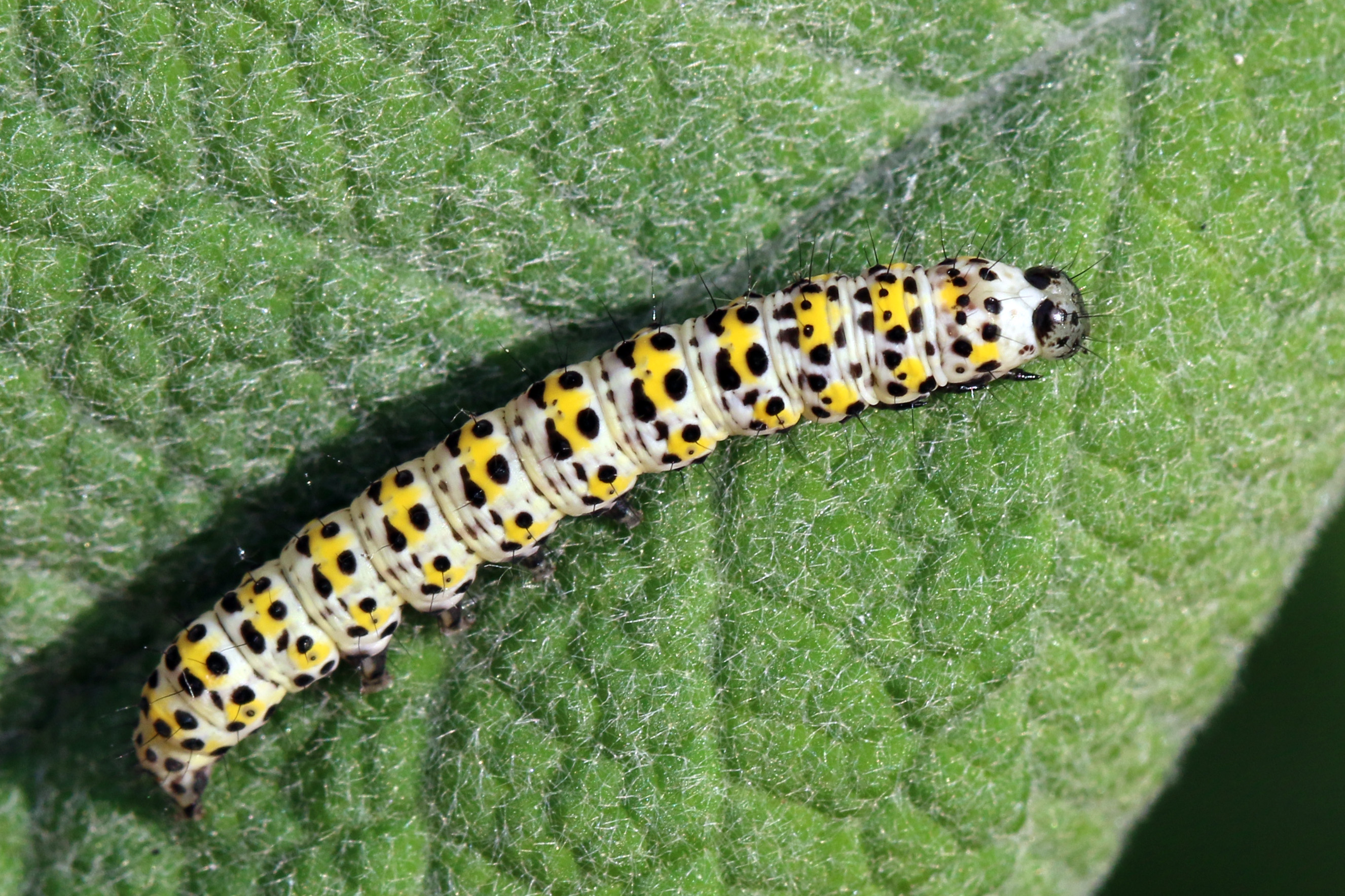

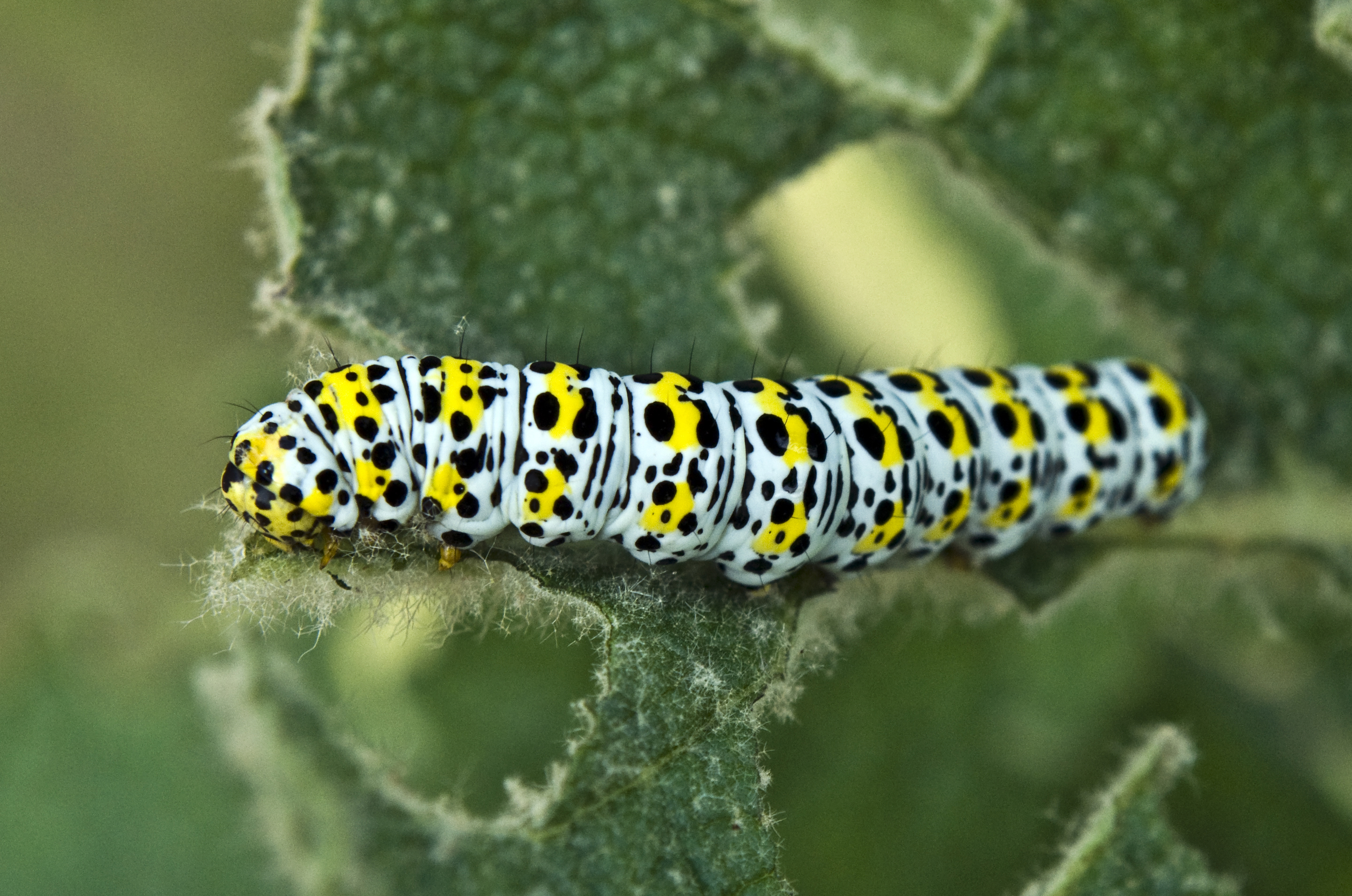
Mulein moth larvae in Carlton, Nottinghamshire

The larva is the most commonly encountered part of the life cycle, clearly visible as it feeds on the leaves of its host plants. When fully grown it is 44–48 mm (1.7–1.9 in) long.

=== Pupa ===
The pupa is the longest part of the life cycle (up to five years in captivity). It lives underground in a strong cocoon.

=== Imago ===
The imago displays much variation in size: wingspan ranges between 45 and 56 mm (1.8 and 2.2 in). They also show minor variation in colour. The moth flies from late April to June depending on the location.

== Host plants ==
- Buddleja – Buddleia, butterfly bush
- Himantoglossum hircinum – lizard orchid
- Scrophularia – figworts
- Verbascum – mulleins

== Bibliography ==
- Heath, John; A. Maitland, Emmet (1983). "Noctuidae: Cucilliinae to Hypeninae". The Moths and Butterflies of Great Britain and Ireland, Vol. 10: Noctuidae (Cucilliinae to Hypeninae) and Agaristidae. Colchester: Harley Books. pp. 49–52. ISBN 9780902068070.
- Waring, Paul; Townsend, Martin; Lewington, Richard (2003). Field Guide to the Moths of Great Britain and Ireland. Hook, UK: British Wildlife Publishing. ISBN 0-9531399-1-3.
- Chinery, Michael (1986). Insects of Britain and Western Europe. Collins. ISBN 0-00-219137-7.
- Porter, Jim (1997). Caterpillars of the British Isles. Viking Publication. ISBN 9780670875092.
