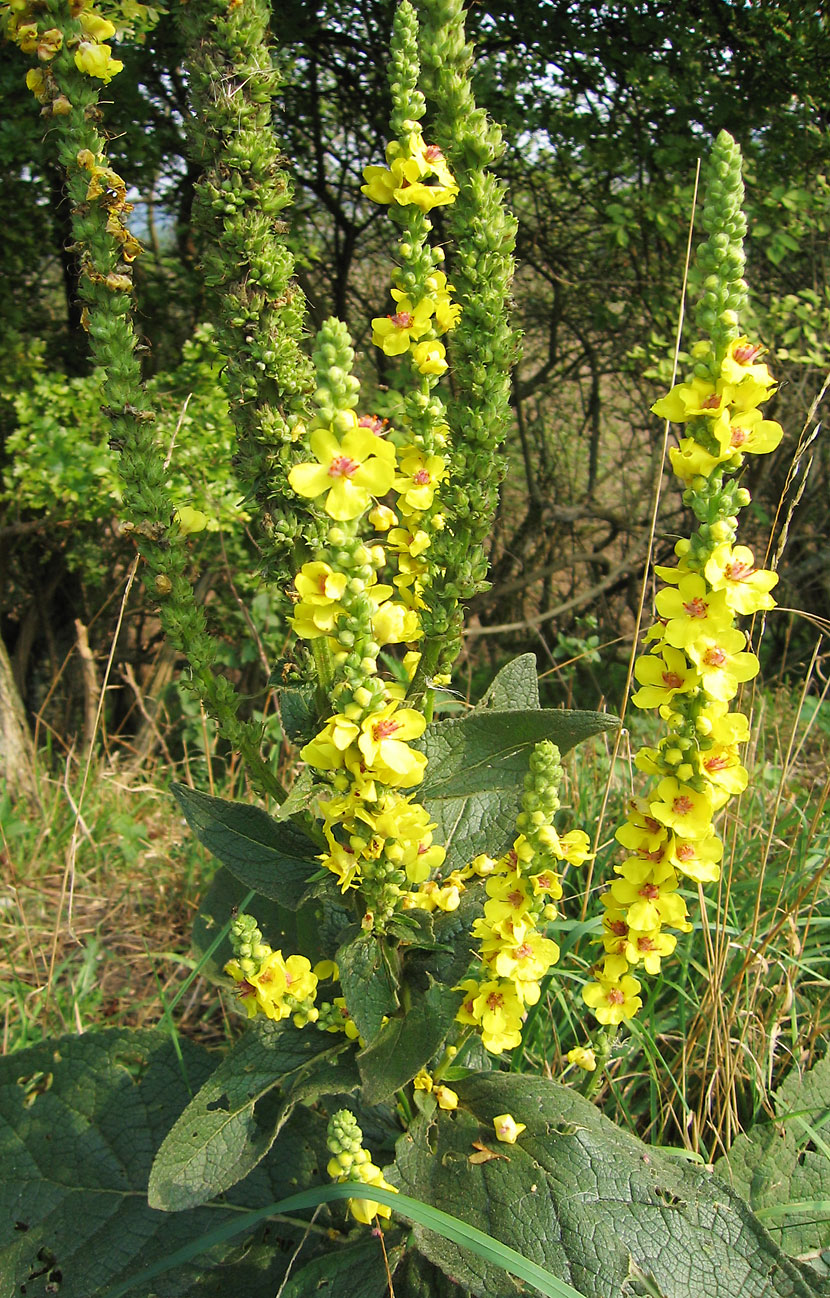

Scientific classification
- Kingdom: Plantae
- Clade: Tracheophytes
- Clade: Angiosperms
- Clade: Eudicots
- Clade: Asterids
- Order: Lamiales
- Family: Scrophulariaceae
- Genus: Verbascum
- Species: V. nigrum

Binomial name
- Verbascum nigrum L.

= Verbascum nigrum =

Species of flowering plant

Verbascum nigrum, the black mullein or dark mullein, is a species of biennial or short-lived perennial herbaceous plant in the mullein genus Verbascum, native to dry open sites in temperate Europe. It grows to 0.5–1.5 m (1.6–4.9 ft).

Verbascum nigrum forms clumps of leaves from which arise multiple tall stems of yellow flowers with purple stamens, blooming over a long period in summer and early autumn. It is cultivated as an ornamental plant, and prefers a calcareous or neutral soil in full sun.

== Fossil record ==
A tentative seed identification of V. nigrum has been made from substage II of the Hoxnian interglacial at Clacton in Essex, UK.
