= Allium frigidum =

Scientific classification
- Kingdom: Plantae
- Clade: Tracheophytes
- Clade: Angiosperms
- Clade: Monocots
- Order: Asparagales
- Family: Amaryllidaceae
- Subfamily: Allioideae
- Genus: Allium
- Species: A. frigidum

Binomial name
- Allium frigidum Boiss. & Heldr.

Synonyms
- Allium achaium Boiss. & Orph.; Allium boissieri Hausskn. ex Regel

Species of flowering plant

Allium frigidum is a species of flowering plant in the family Amaryllidaceae. It is endemic to Greece.

== Description ==
Allium frigidum produces egg-shaped bulbs up to 25 mm long. Its scape is up to 30 cm tall, round in cross-section, erect, about 5 mm across. Its leaves are about the same length as the scape, 3 mm wide. Umbel has up to 45 flowers, the pedicels unequal in length. Flowers are bell-shaped, pale yellow tinged with pink. Anthers are yellow, ovary green.
