= Coleophora maritella =

Scientific classification
- Kingdom: Animalia
- Phylum: Arthropoda
- Class: Insecta
- Order: Lepidoptera
- Family: Coleophoridae
- Genus: Coleophora
- Species: C. maritella

Binomial name
- Coleophora maritella McDunnough, 1941

Species of moth

Coleophora maritella is a moth of the family Coleophoridae. It is found in Canada, including New Brunswick.

The larvae feed on the seeds of Juncus littoralis. They create a trivalved, tubular silken case.
