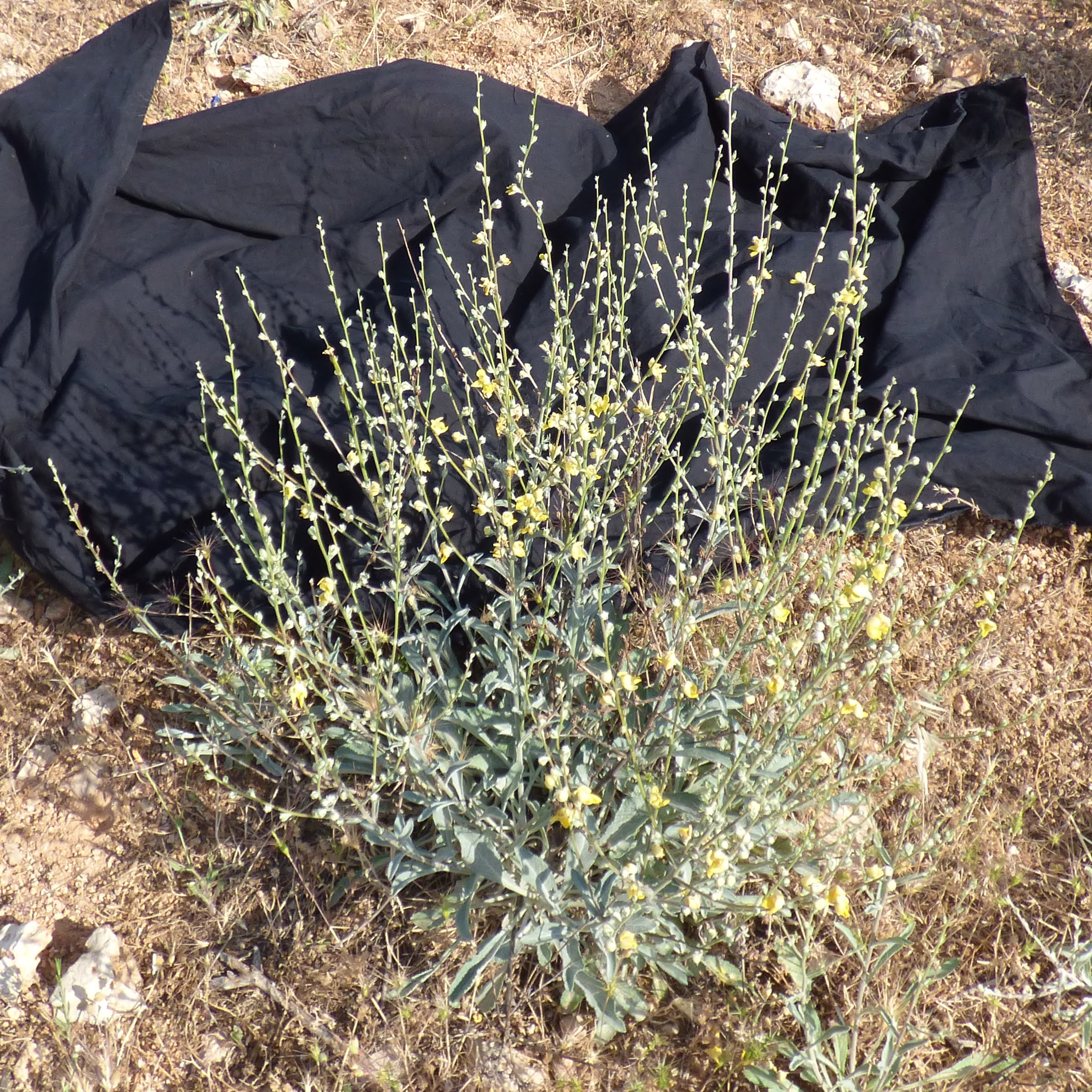
- From Varsak in Antalya

Scientific classification
- Kingdom: Plantae
- Clade: Embryophytes
- Clade: Tracheophytes
- Clade: Angiosperms
- Clade: Eudicots
- Clade: Asterids
- Order: Lamiales
- Family: Scrophulariaceae
- Genus: Verbascum
- Species: V. leptocladum

Binomial name
- Verbascum leptocladum Boiss. & Heldr.

= Verbascum leptocladum =

Species of flowering plant

Verbascum leptocladum is a species of mullein in the Scrophulariaceae family of flowers. It is endemic to the Antalya region of Turkey and was first described in 1853. It is nationally classed as Endangered (EN) (2012).

== Description ==
It is a moderately high (typically to 50 cm (20 in)) perennial, with many narrow greyish tongue-like leaves at the base, smaller stem leaves, and at the top a broad branched spray of yellow flowers. Considered closely, the stems are rather slender, the leaves have weakly crenate margins, and the flowers are yellow on short stalks, grouped in small clusters of 1–3, with 5 kidney-shaped anthers. Genetically the plant has no near allies.

It grows near Pinus brutia forest, to 250 m (820 ft) altitude, endemic to Antalya, Turkey.

== Photographic description ==
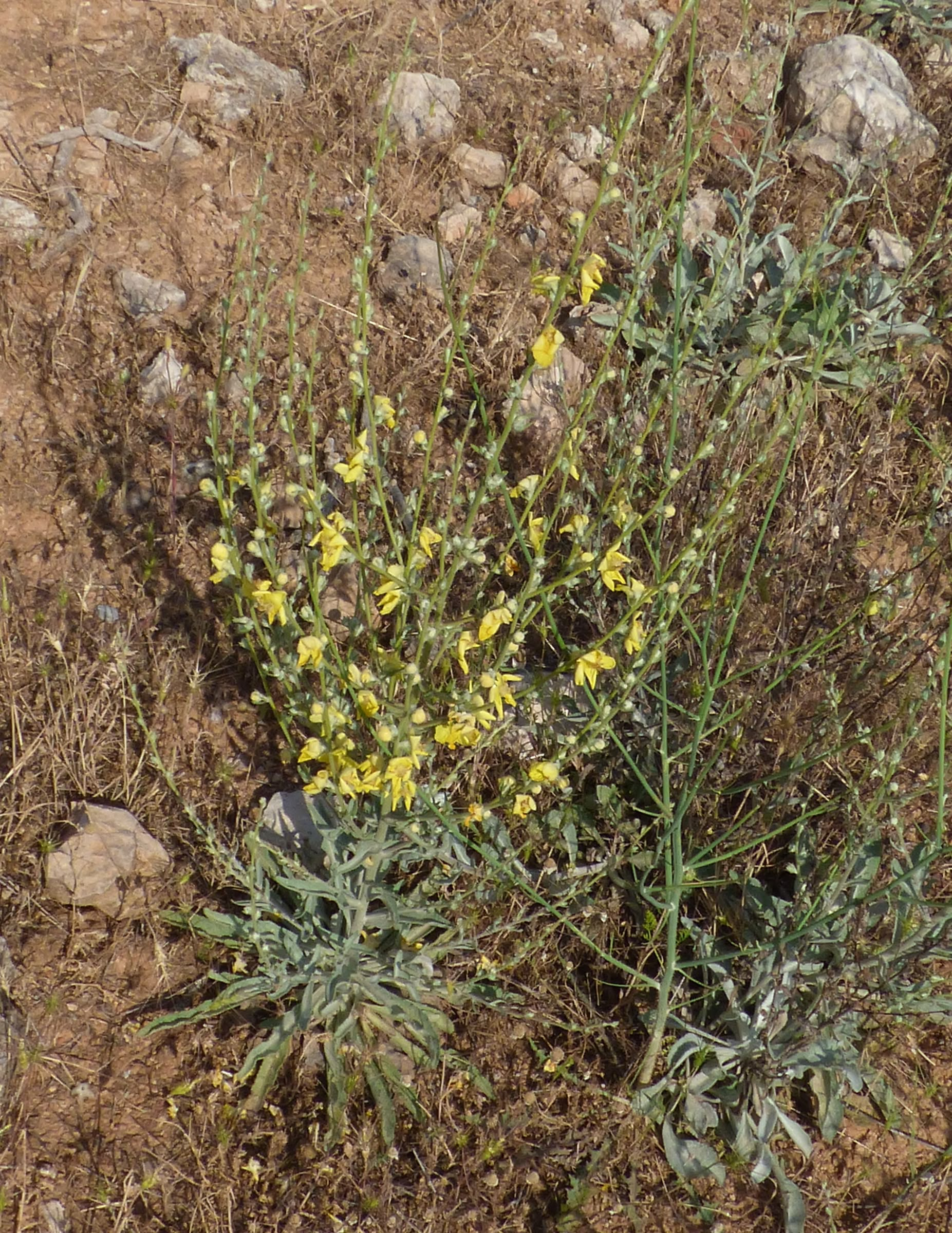
Plant, greyish looking with wide spray of flowers

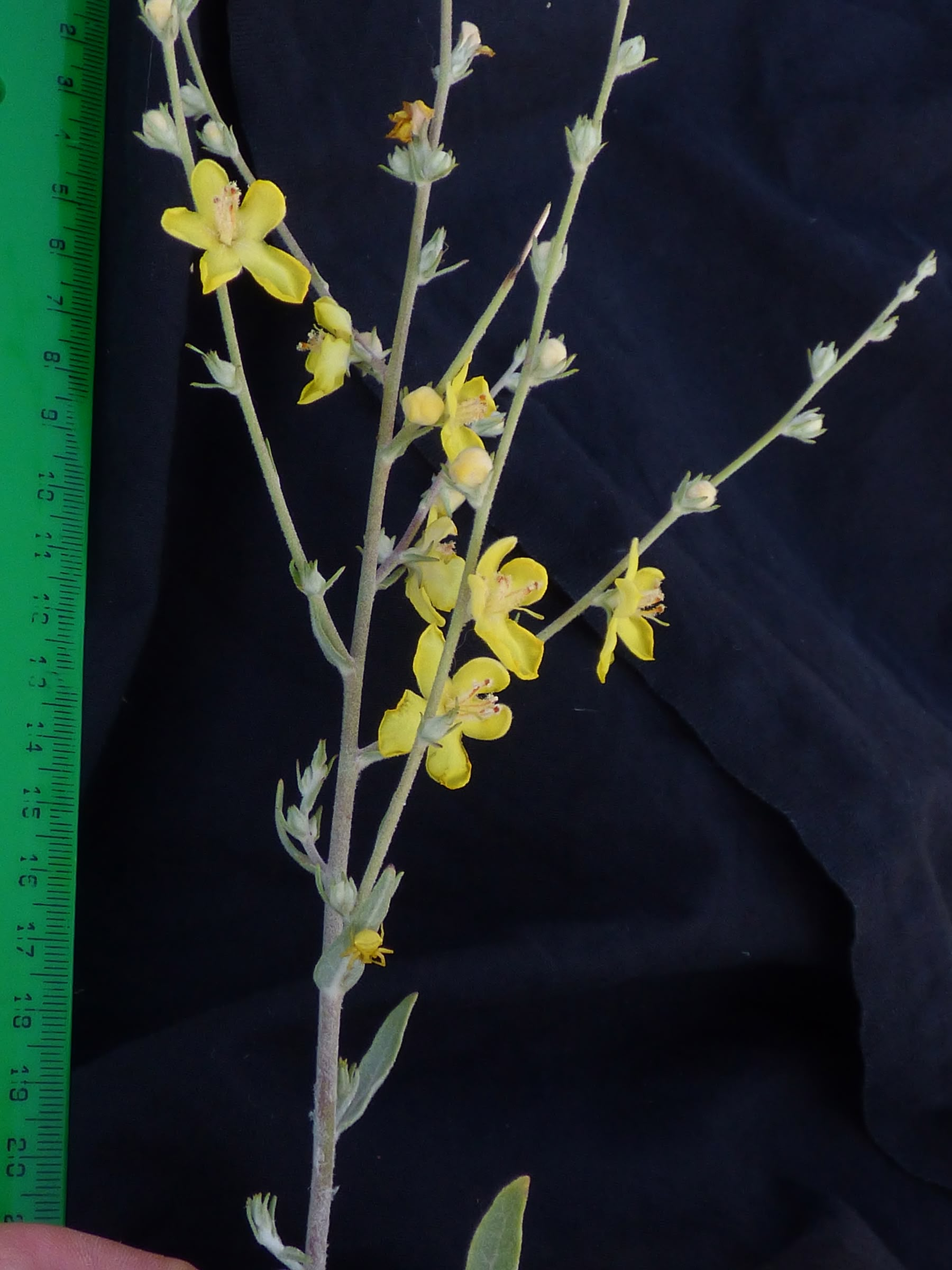
Part of inflorescence

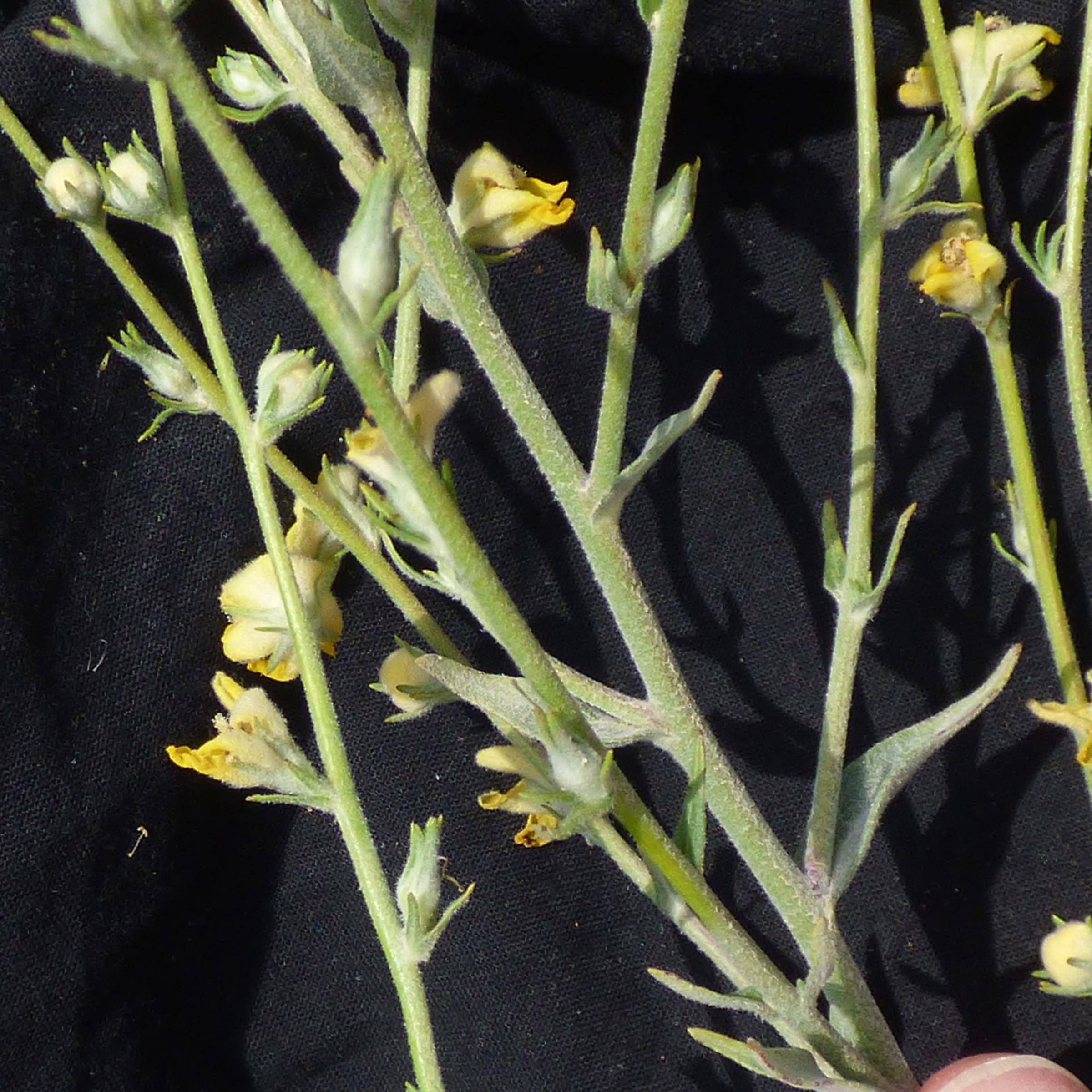
Inflorescence

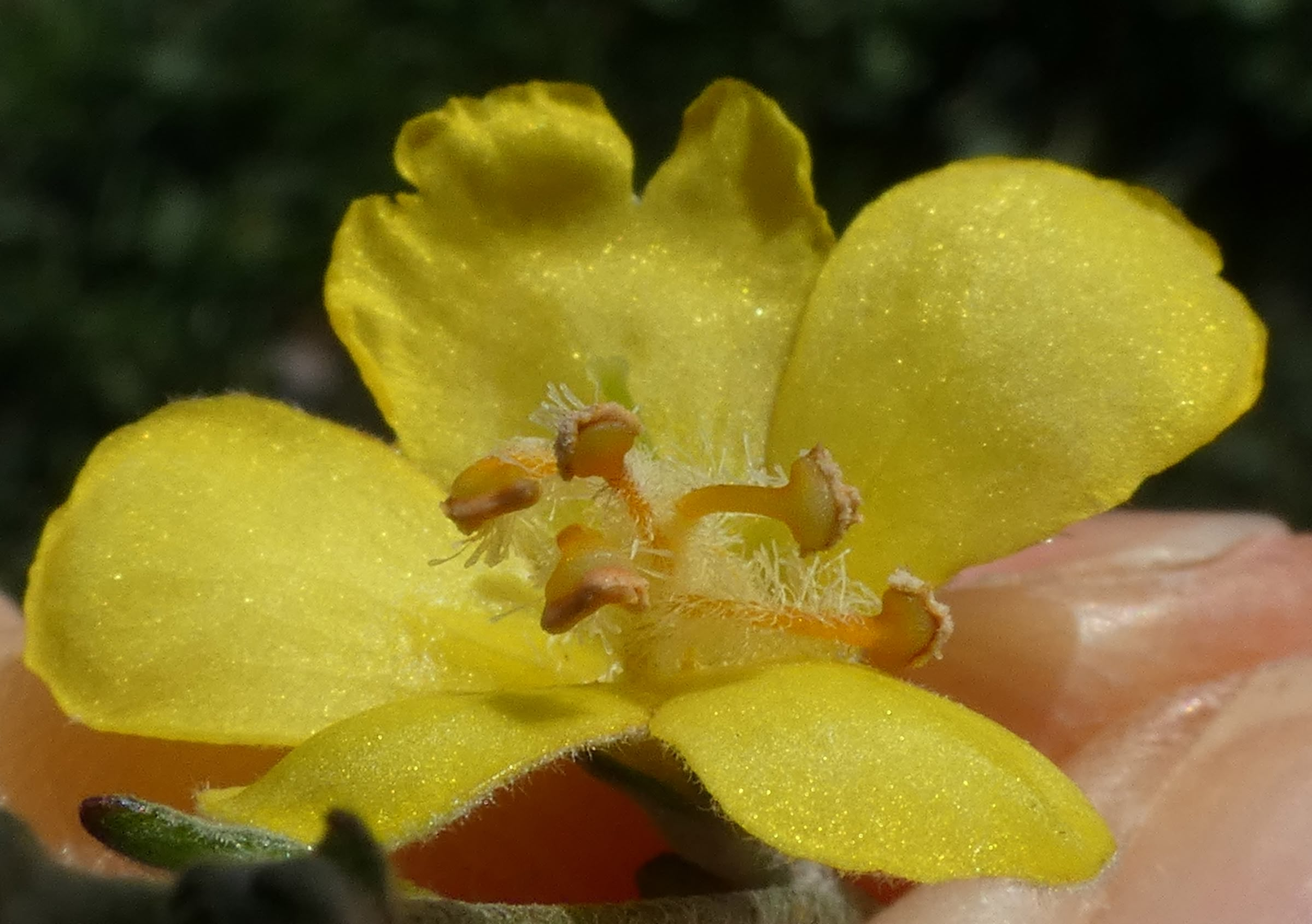
5 petals, 5 filaments, with kidney-shaped anthers and white hairs

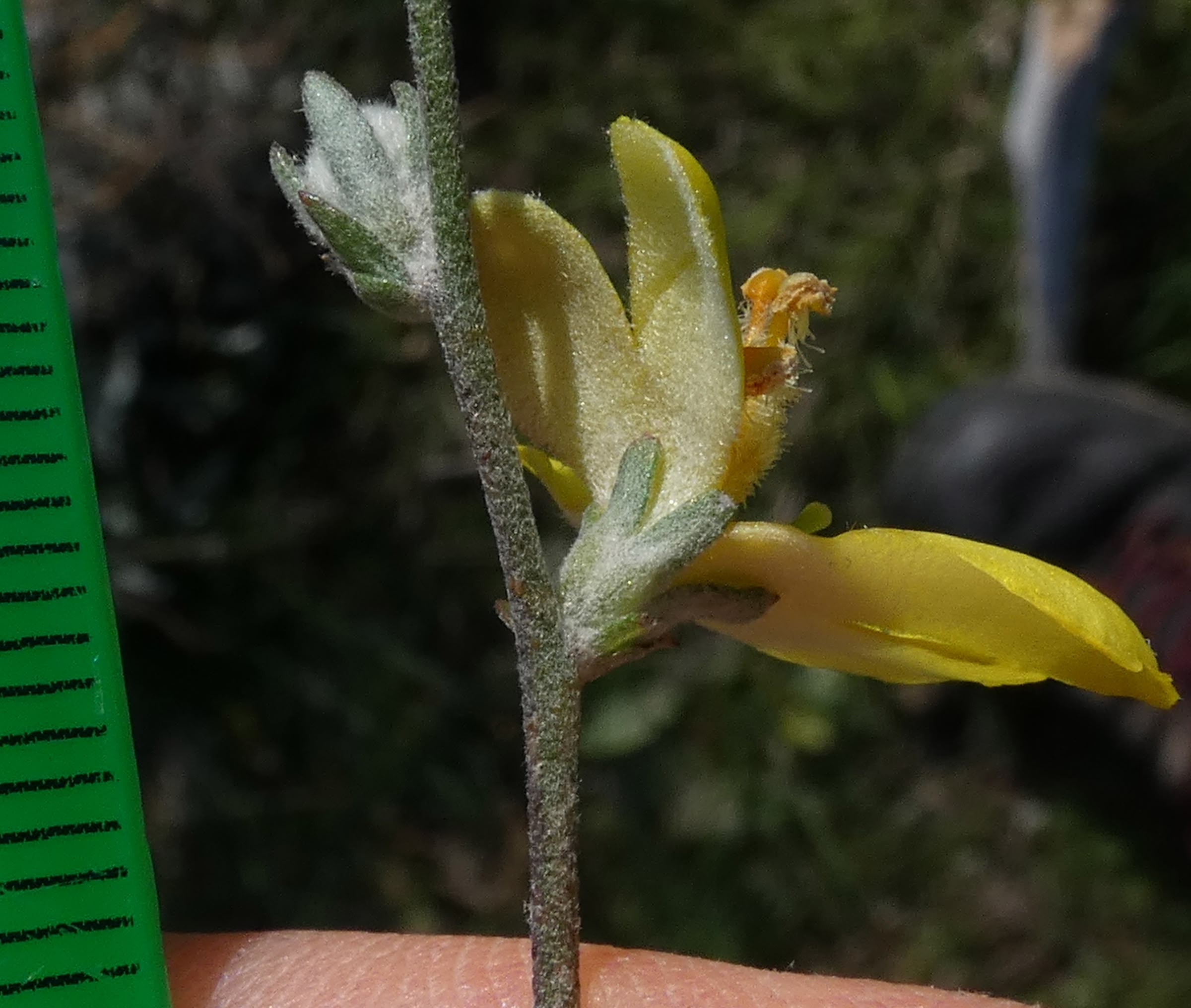
Hairy flower underside, with calyx

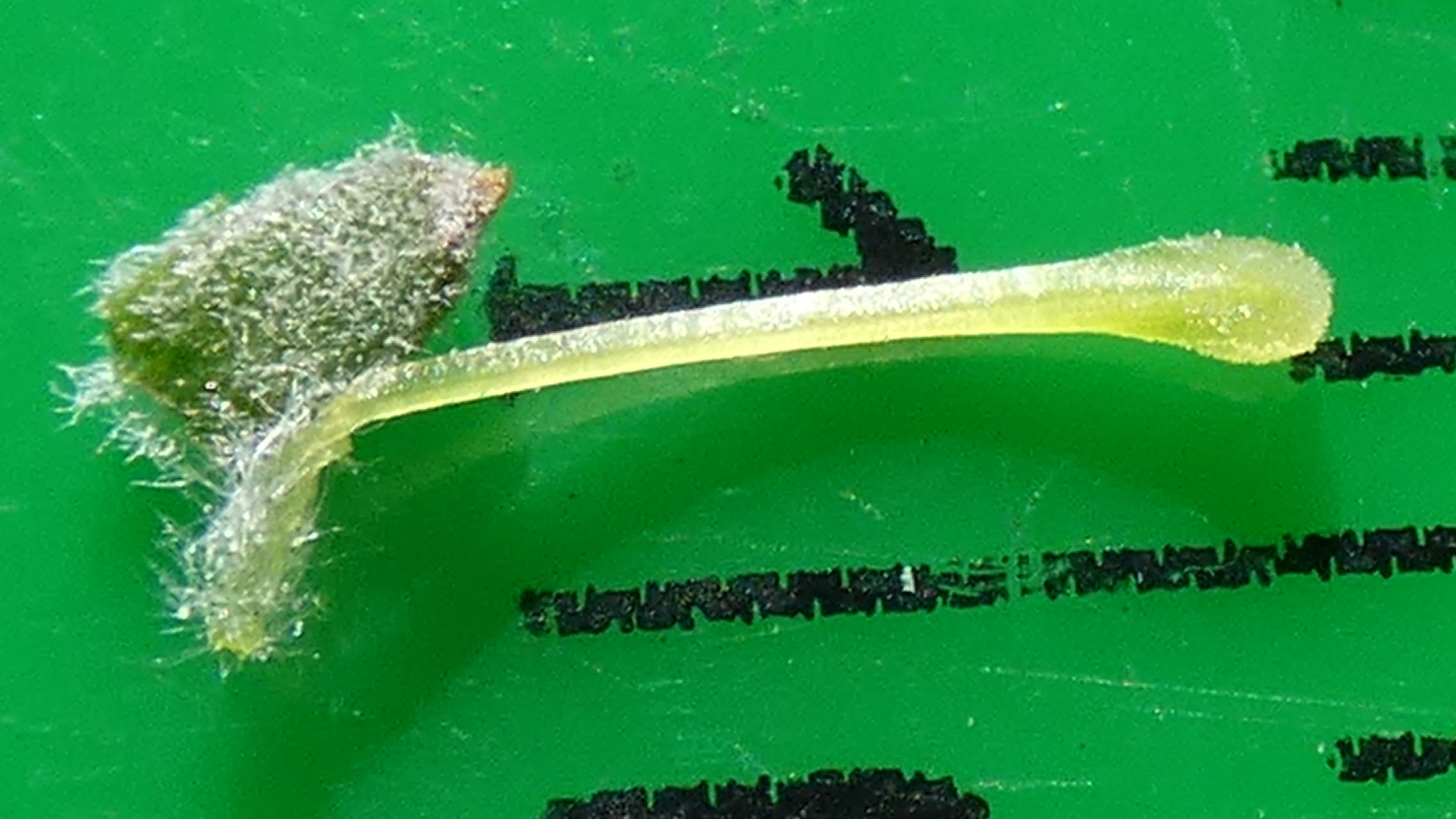
Stigma, style

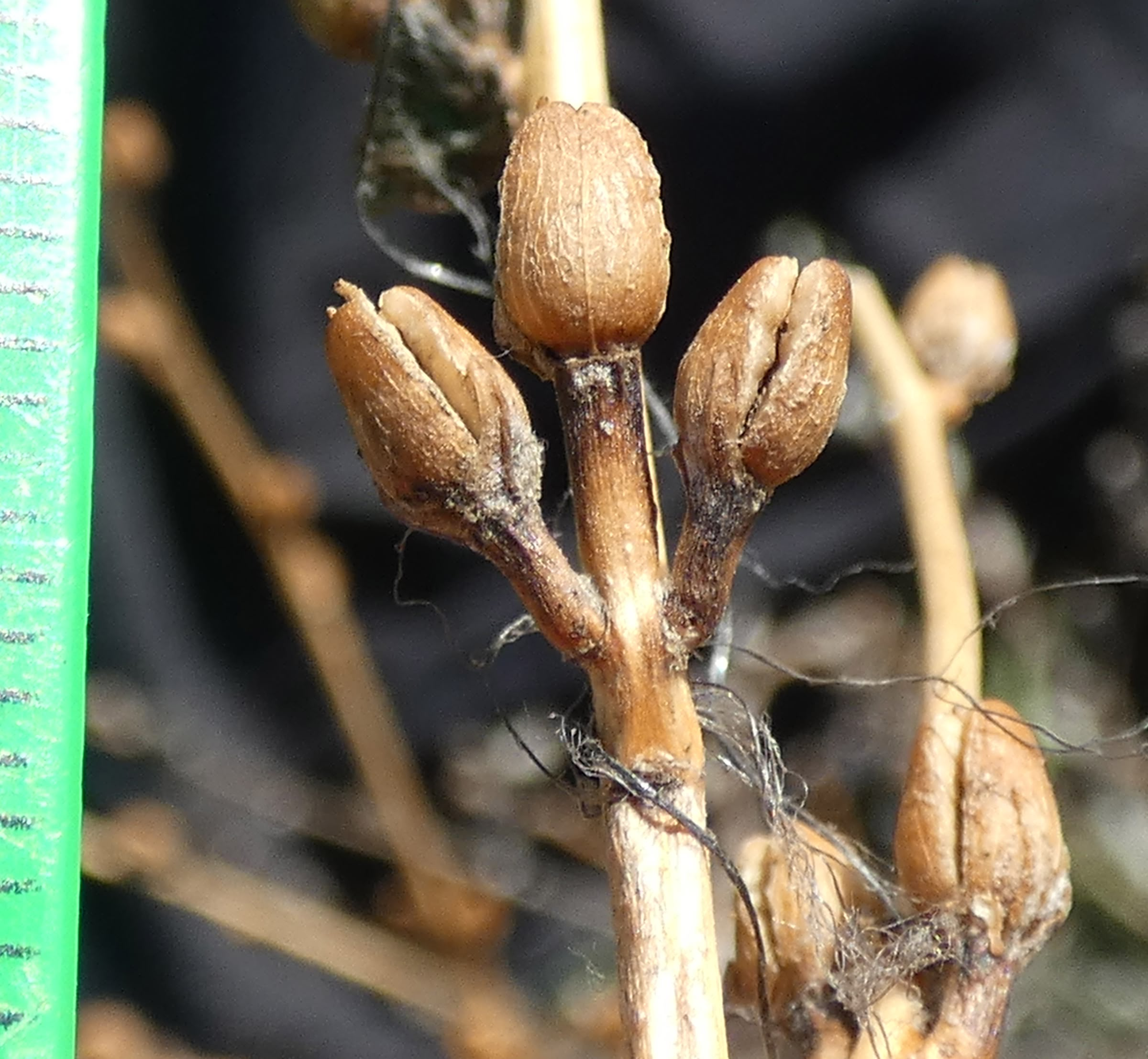
Capsule

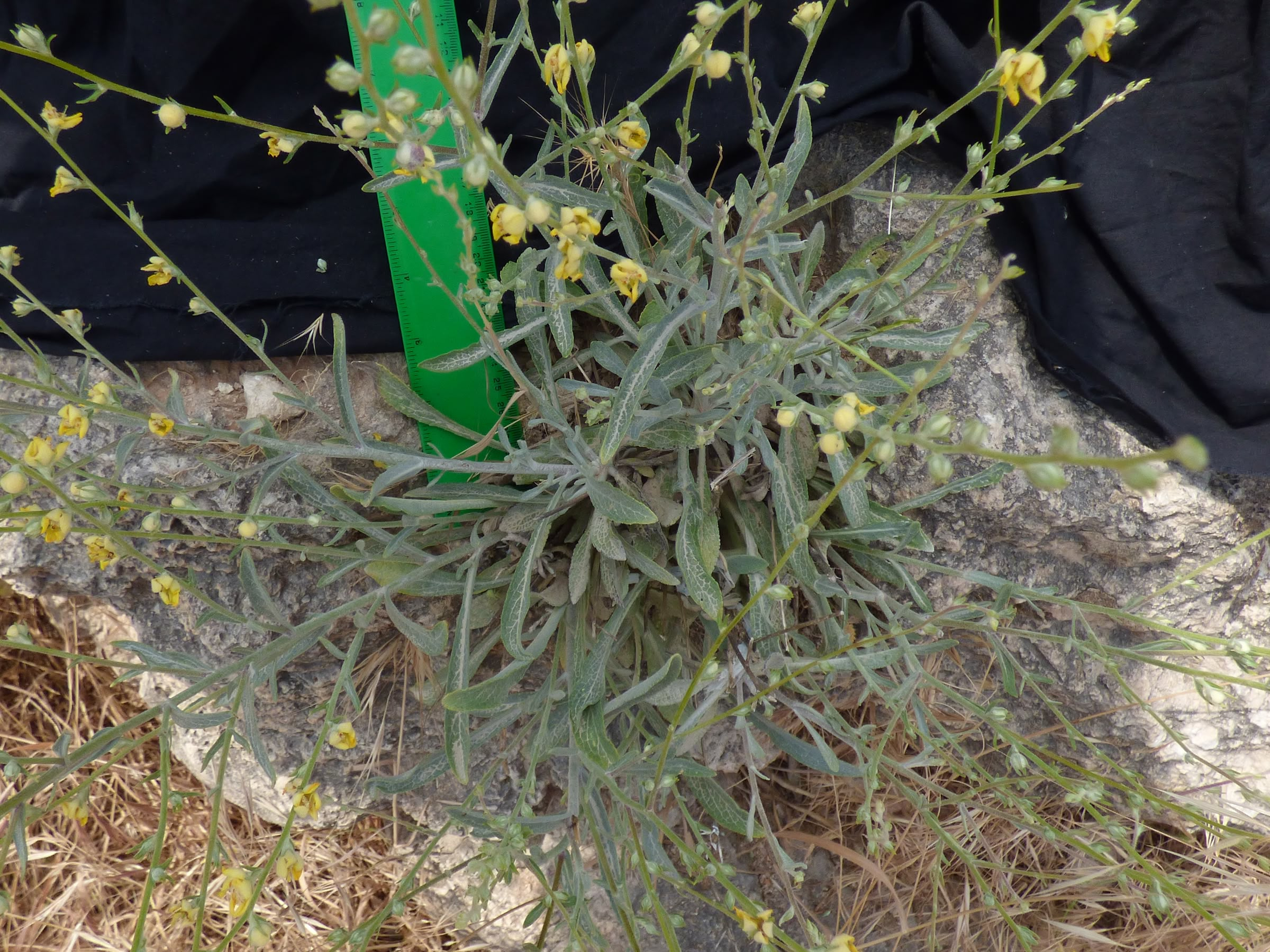
Base leaves

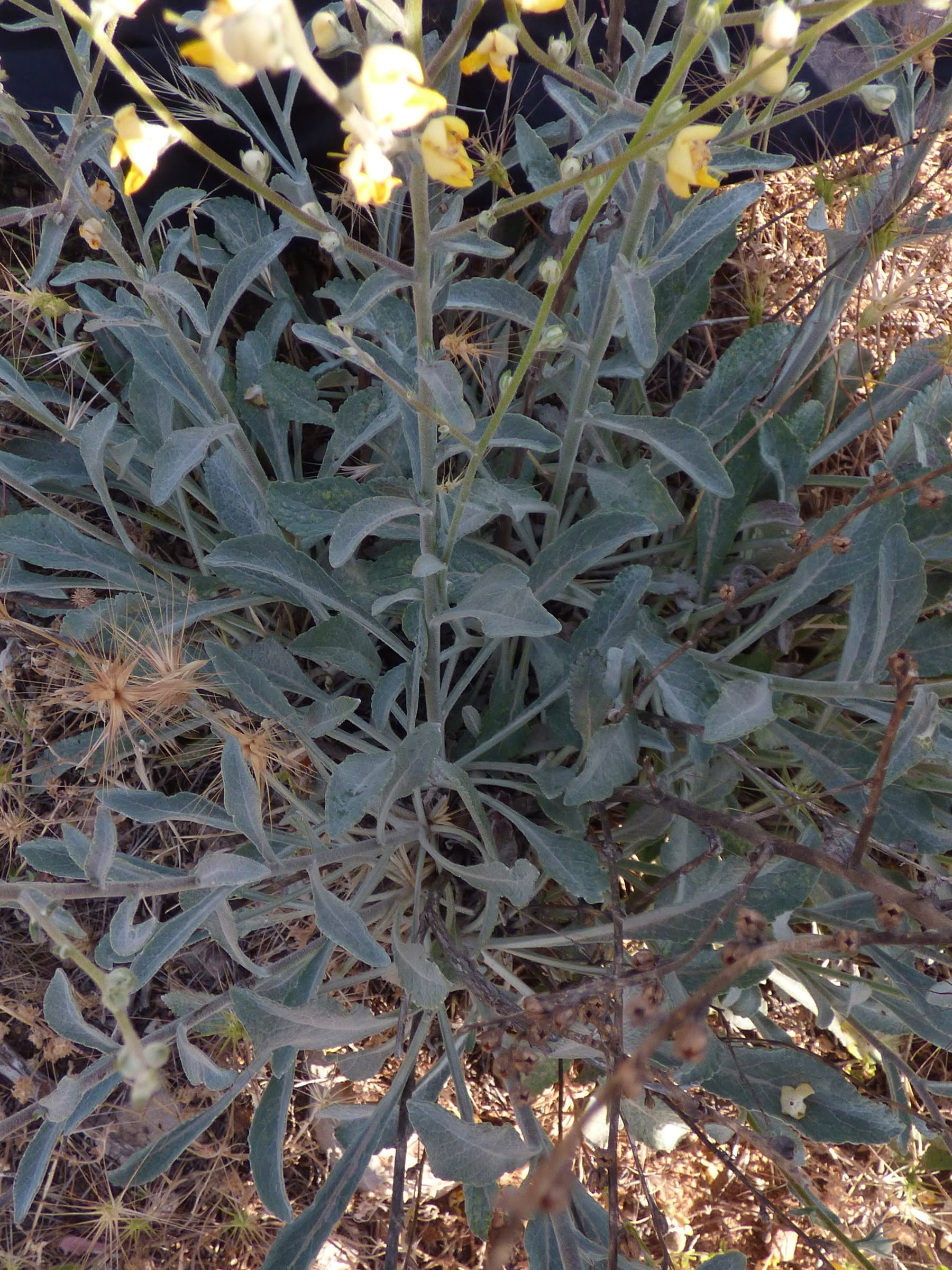
Mid leaves

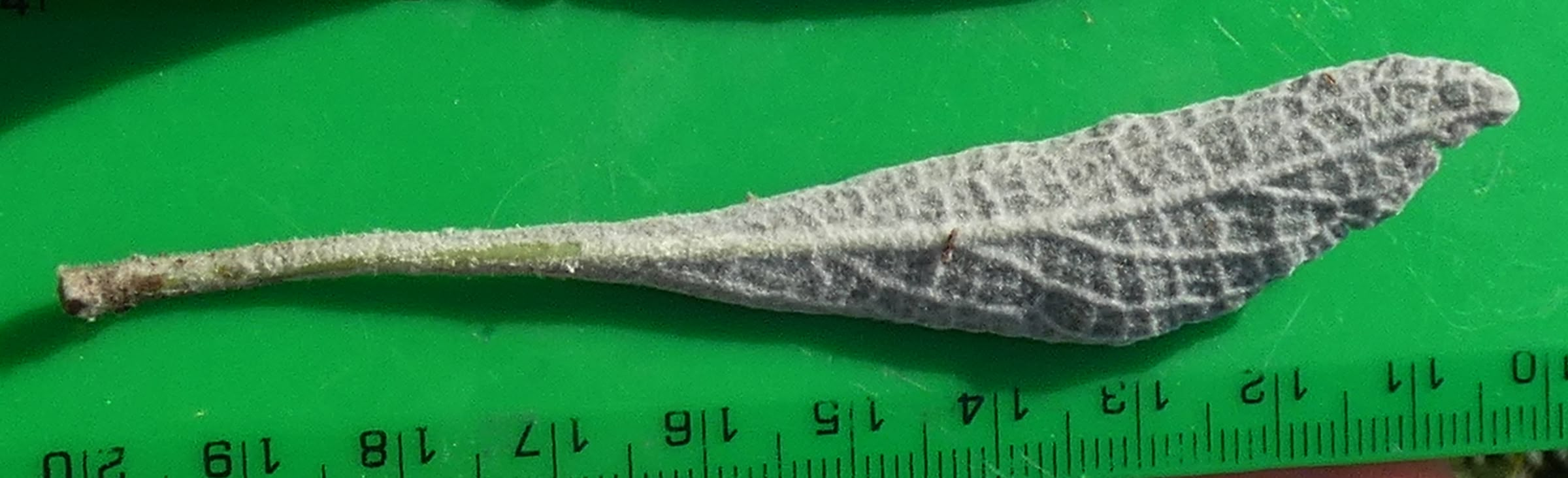
Leaf

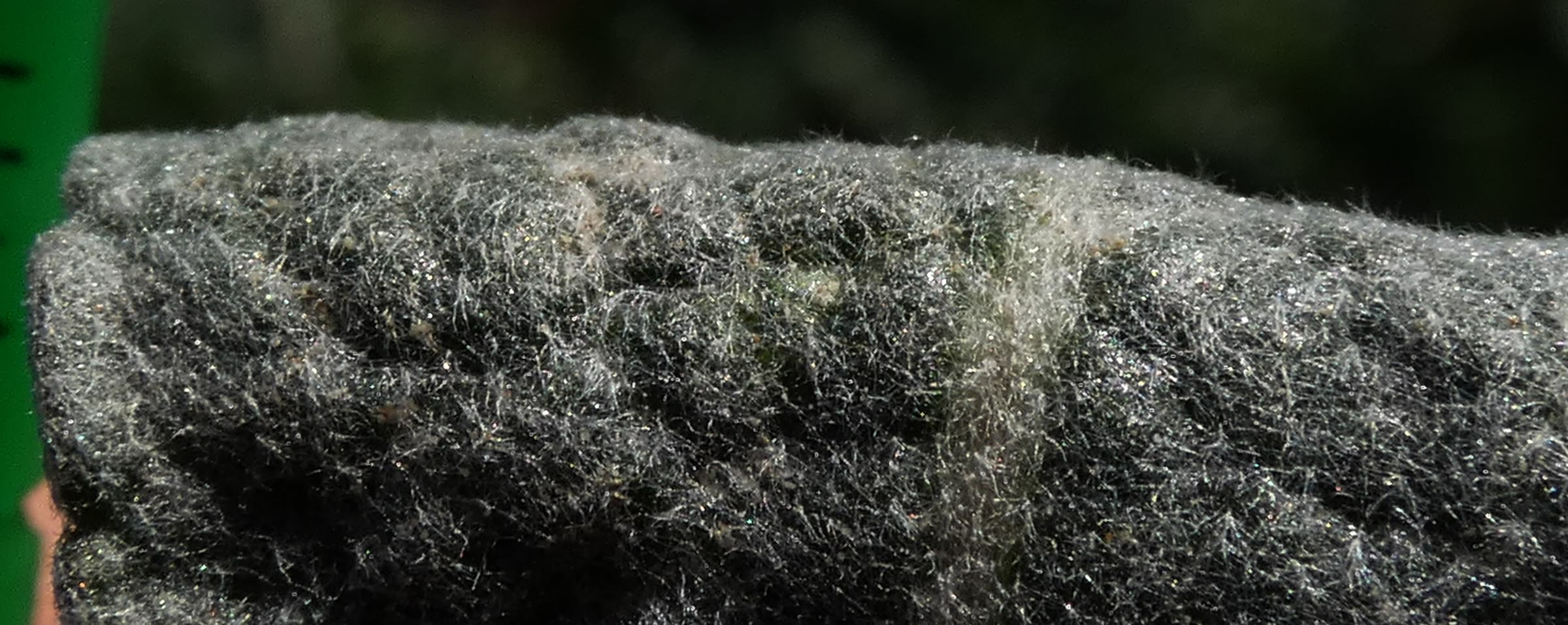
Leaf upperside

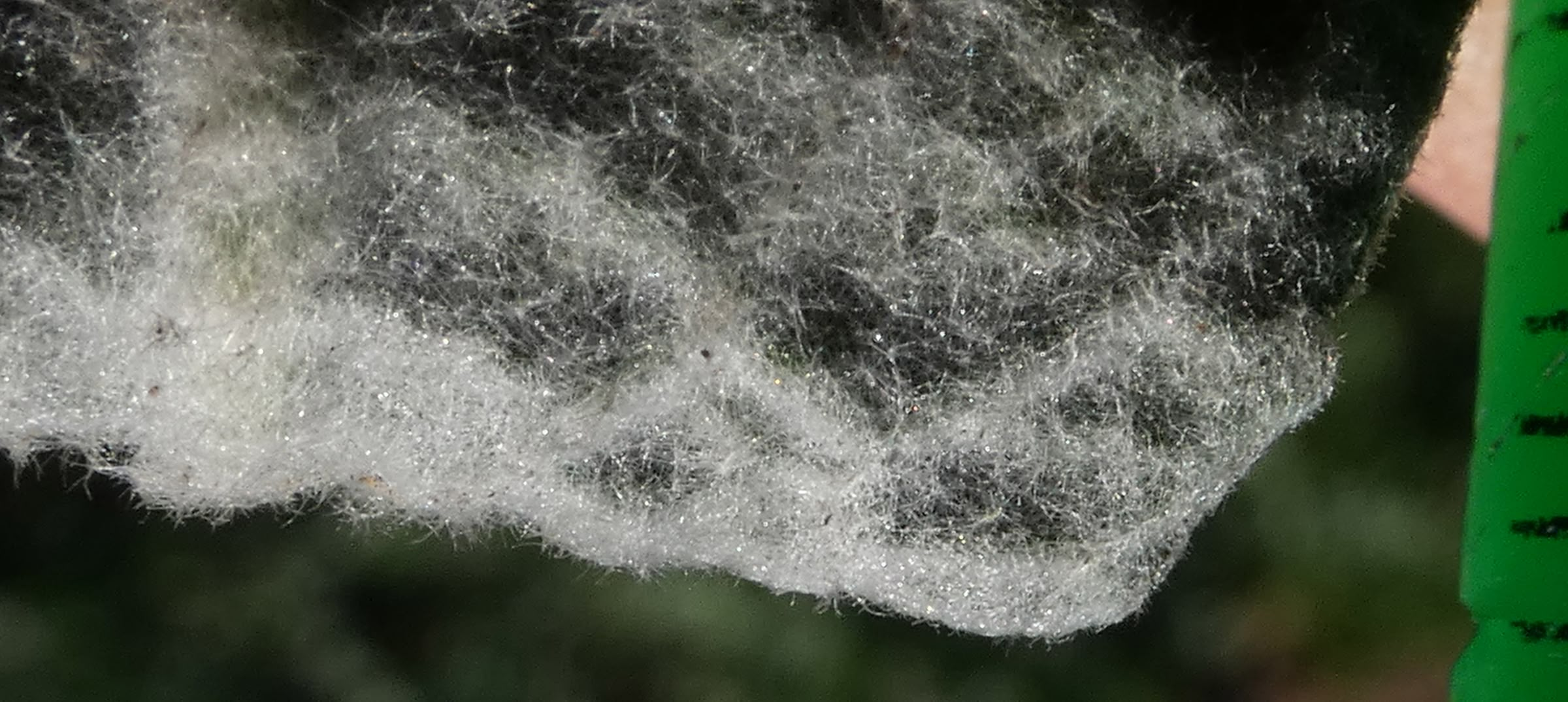
Leaf underside

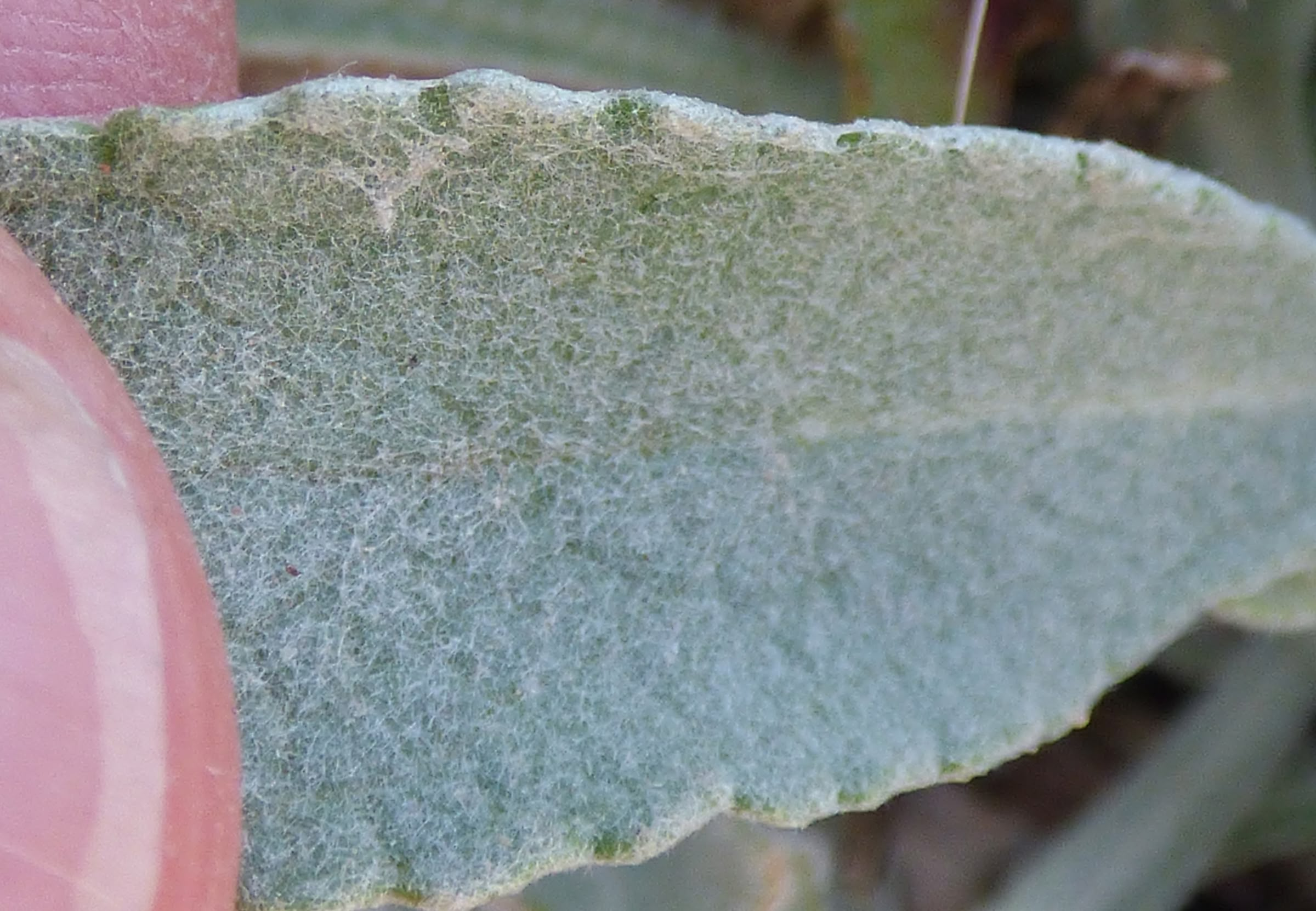
Obscure teeth

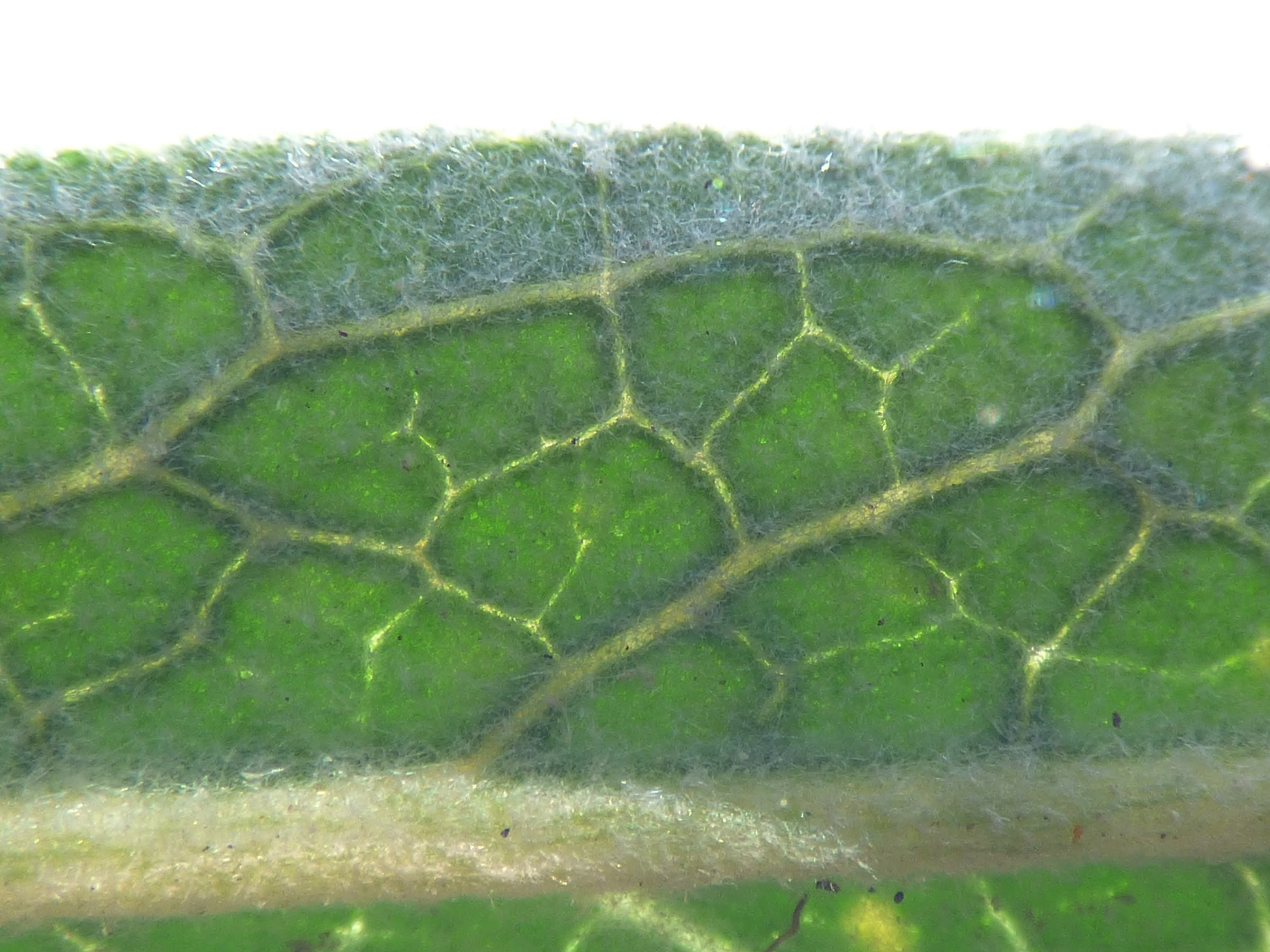
Veining

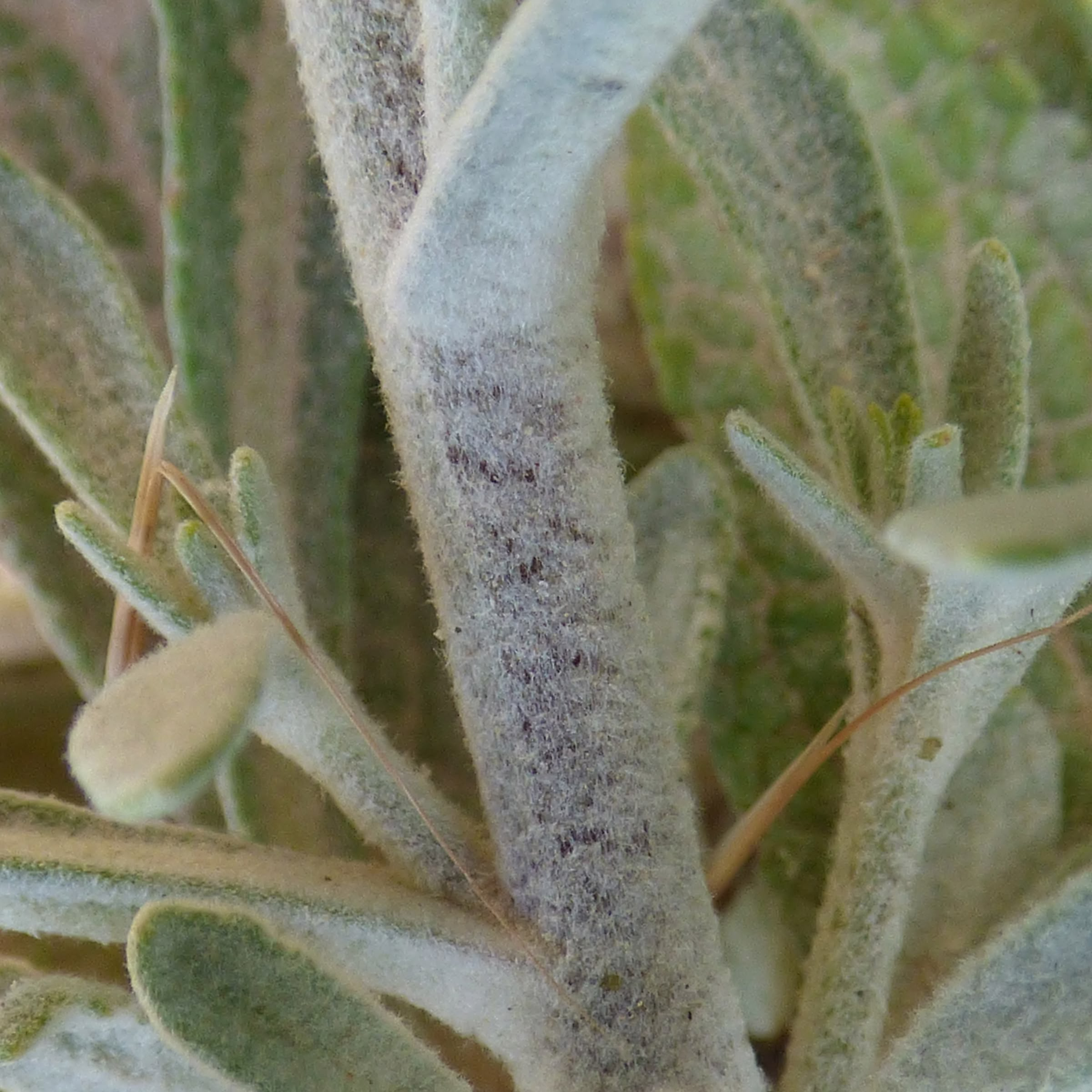
Stem and leaf join

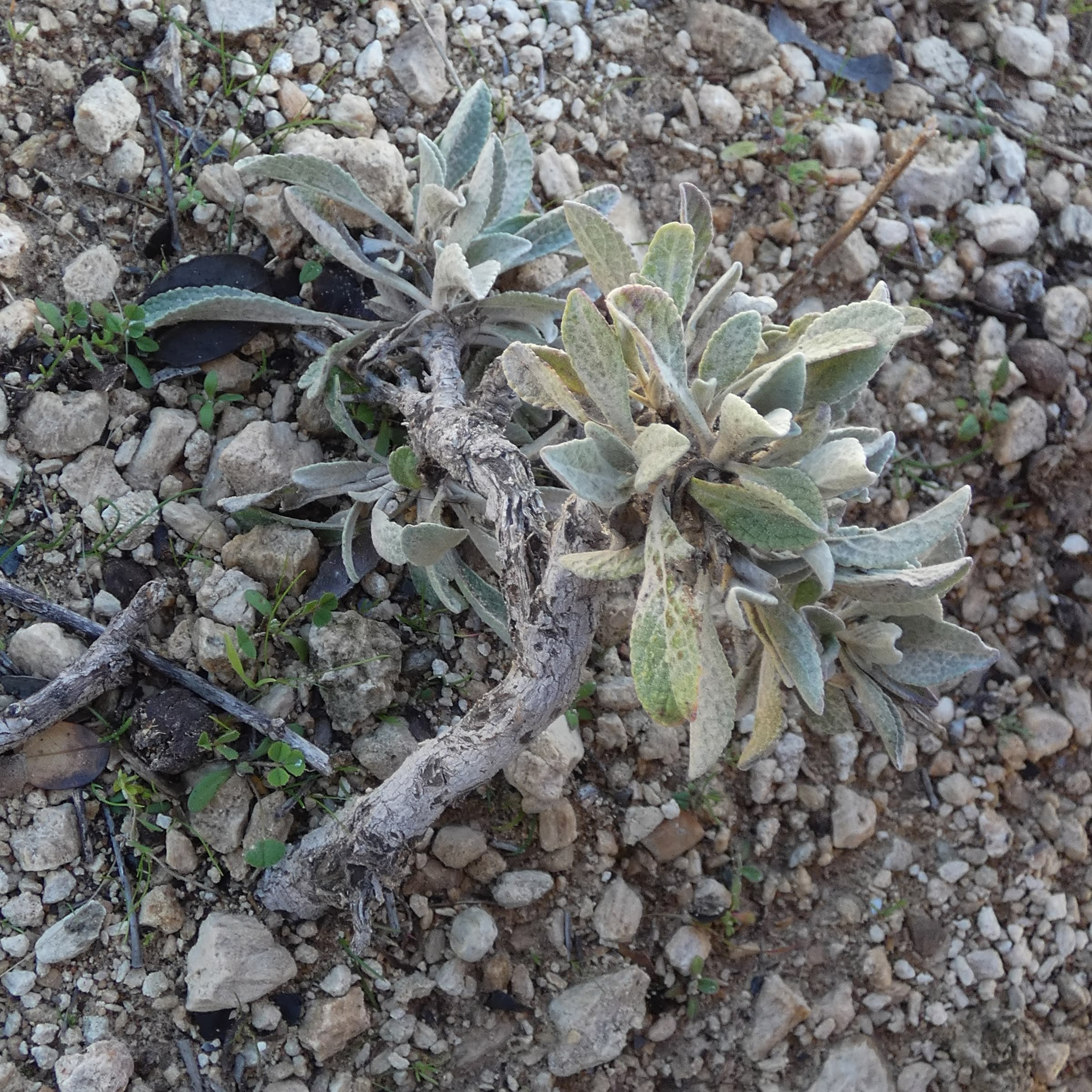
Woody stem forming
