= Isoetes heldreichii =

Conservation status
- Critically endangered, possibly extinct (IUCN 3.1)

Scientific classification
- Kingdom: Plantae
- Clade: Tracheophytes
- Clade: Lycophytes
- Class: Lycopodiopsida
- Order: Isoetales
- Family: Isoetaceae
- Genus: Isoetes
- Species: I. heldreichii

Binomial name
- Isoetes heldreichii Wettst.

Southern European species of quillwort

Isoetes heldreichii, or Pindus quillwort, is a species of lycopod. It is critically endangered. Some think it extinct as it was last seen in 1885.

== Description ==
The plant forms a small, trilobed corm that anchors in the soft mud of clear, spring-fed pools. From this corm arise the stiff, grass-like leaves, which retain their pale green colour while entirely under water. Each leaf encloses a sporangium near its base; unlike in some terrestrial quillworts, the sporangium is not partly covered by a membranous velum. During the summer the plant releases two kinds of spores: large megaspores that will develop into female gametophytes, and much smaller, spiny microspores that give rise to male gametophytes. To the naked eye the megaspores appear whitish, but under a microscope their surface is seen to be densely tuberculate, a texture that helps botanists tell the species apart.

== Distribution ==
Isoetes heldreichii is known only from its type locality at Palaiokastro, near the modern city of Karditsa in central Greece. The original habitat was a cluster of perennial springs at the foot of Mount Pindus, where Haussknecht collected submerged plants in July 1885. Those springs were later diverted to supply drinking water to Karditsa, and the pool in which the quillwort grew has disappeared. Despite targeted searches, no further populations have been located, and the species is therefore regarded as extinct in the wild.

== Taxonomy ==
Isoetes heldreichii was first described in 1886 by the Austrian botanist Richard von Wettstein, who based the name on material collected the previous summer in Thessaly by Carl Haussknecht. Wettstein incorrectly assumed that his travelling companion Theodor von Heldreich had discovered the plant and therefore dedicated the epithet to him.

A re-examination of Haussknecht's original gatherings confirmed that the species is morphologicallydistinct from all other Greek quillworts. It possesses only 7–14 slender leaves per corm, each about 16–18 cm long and barely 1 mm wide, and it produces relatively large megaspores—340–570 micrometres (μm) in diameter—densely covered with tiny warts. Its microspores are 27–32 μm long and bear short spines. The smooth external cuticle of the leaves and the permanently submerged habit further separate it from the more widespread I. haussknechtii and the Mediterranean I. delilei.
