= Heldreichia =

Scientific classification
- Kingdom: Plantae
- Clade: Tracheophytes
- Clade: Angiosperms
- Clade: Eudicots
- Clade: Rosids
- Order: Brassicales
- Family: Brassicaceae
- Genus: Heldreichia; Boiss.
- Species: H. bupleurifolia

Binomial name
- Heldreichia bupleurifolia Boiss.

Genus of plants

Heldreichia is a monotypic genus of flowering plants belonging to the family Brassicaceae. The only species is Heldreichia bupleurifolia.

Its native range is the eastern Mediterranean. It is found in the countries of Lebanon-Syria, Palestine and Turkey.

The genus name of Heldreichia is in honour of Theodor von Heldreich (1822–1902), a German botanist born in Dresden. The Latin specific epithet of bupleurifolia refers to means ‘with leaves like those of the genus Bupleurum’, a large genus in the Apiaceae (carrot family), commonly called Hare’s Ear. The genus name Bupleurum is also an ancient Greek word for ‘umbelliferous plant’.

It was first described and published in Ann. Sci. Nat., Bot., sér.2, Vol.16 on page 381 in 1841.

It has 1 known variety and 5 known subspecies;

- Heldreichia bupleurifolia var. atalayi (Kit Tan) Parolly, Nordt & Mumm.
- Heldreichia bupleurifolia subsp. bourgaei (Boiss.) Parolly, Nordt & Mumm.
- Heldreichia bupleurifolia subsp. bupleurifolia
- Heldreichia bupleurifolia subsp. malatyana Özüdogru & Yildirim
- Heldreichia bupleurifolia subsp. polymorpha Parolly, Nordt, Eren & Mumm.
- Heldreichia bupleurifolia subsp. rotundifolia (Boiss.) Parolly, Nordt & Mumm.
