= Juncus littoralis =

Scientific classification
- Kingdom: Plantae
- Clade: Tracheophytes
- Clade: Angiosperms
- Clade: Monocots
- Clade: Commelinids
- Order: Poales
- Family: Juncaceae
- Genus: Juncus
- Species: J. littoralis

Binomial name
- Juncus littoralis C.A.Mey.

Species of plant

Juncus littoralis is a species of rush in the family Juncaceae known as coastal rush; it has no subspecies.

== Description ==
Juncus littoralis is a large rush (to 100 cm) forming individualised densely-stemmed plants, the stems rigid (2-4 mm wide). The flowers have 6 tepals of which the 3 inner have a conspicuous white upper margin and are notched at the top, the fruit capsules are dark brown and moderately sized (to 4 mm) with sharpish edging creating a pyramidal top. The inflorescence is usually formed of tight clusters held either closely together or in proximity (resembling J. acutus). The final bracts under the small flower heads are smaller than the flowers. Seeds are 0.8-1.1 mm long (1.5-2.0 mm including appendages).

Given its habitat requirement of salty sands, when identifying plants outside that habitat or country range the similar species below should be considered.

=== Similar species ===
- J. heldreichianus has fruits with blunt edging and top, with (for the low altitude attaining ssp heldreichianus) long-drawn-out inflorescence, final bracts under the flowers larger than the flowers, and narrower rather arching lower stems.
- J. acutus has a large fruit capsule (4-6 mm).
- J. maritimus and J. rigidus tend to form creeping patches and have long upward inflorescences (sometimes contracted).

== Range ==
Juncus littoralis is found in countries bordering the Mediterranean, Black and Caspian Seas - Albania, Algeria, Balearics, Bulgaria, Cyprus, East Aegean Is., Egypt, France, Greece, Iran, Italy, Kriti, Krym, Lebanon-Syria, Libya, North Caucasus, Palestine, Romania, Sinai, Spain, Transcaucasus, Turkey, Turkey-in-Europe, Turkmenistan, Ukraine, Yugoslavia.

== Habitat ==
This rush is found on moving sand and other sandy coastal habitats, rarely in saline inland habitats. and in Turkey on maritime sands and the shores of saline lakes.
