= Theodor von Heldreich =

German botanist (1822–1902)

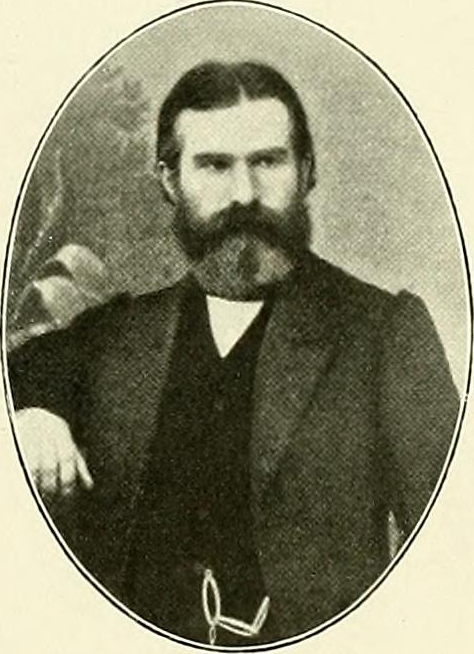
- Born: March 3, 1822; Dresden, German
- Died: September 7, 1902 (aged 80); Athens, Greece
- Resting place: First Cemetery of Athens
- Citizenship: German (1822-1902); Greek (1851-1902)
- Education: University of Montpellier
- Known for: Botanical Classification; Greek Flora
- Spouse: Sofia Katakouzinos
- Children: Karolina Kieseritzky; Ioannna Mindler
- Scientific career
- Fields: Botany
- Workplaces: National Garden of Athens; National Historical Museum
- Doctoral advisors: Michel Félix Dunal
- Author abbrev. (botany): Heldr

Theodor Heinrich Hermann von Heldreich (3 March 1822 – 7 September 1902) was a German botanist born in Dresden. In 1851, he settled in Greece for the rest of his life. He carried out botanical experiments in the country. He published thirteen volumes of the "Herbarium Graecum Normale" between 1856 and 1896. In Greece, he served as director of the National Garden of Athens for over 50 years. He was also director of the natural history museum of Athens. Heldreich was good friends with Charles Darwin.

== Biography ==
Scion of an old aristocratic family, he was the son of Conrad Friedrich Robert Heldreich and Amalia Charlotte Humbold. He initially studied philosophy. A love of botany, however, took him to Montpellier in 1837 to study under Professor Michel Félix Dunal. He later completed his botanical education in Geneva (1838–1842).

In 1841, he was honoured by botanist Pierre Edmond Boissier, who named a genus of plants (in family Brassicaceae) from Palestine and Turkey Heldreichia.

His first botanical expedition was to Sicily, after which he published his first work "Tre nuove specie di piante scoverte nella Sicilia".

From 1843 to 1848, he travelled extensively throughout Italy, Greece, Asia Minor and Crete. During 1849 and 1850 he lived in England, and then for a year in Paris where he served as curator of P. Barker Webb's herbarium.

In 1851, he settled permanently in Greece, where he carried out rigorous botanical investigations. He started to edit at least eight exsiccata-like series, among them publishing sixteen volumes of the "Herbarium Graecum Normale" between 1856 and 1900 and distributing specimens collected by Giovanni Battista Samaritani in Egypt under the title Samaritani delectus plantarum Aegypti inferioris curante Th. de Heldreich. In Greece he served as director of the court garden for over 50 years, as well as director of the natural history museum, where in addition to the department of botany he helped create departments of zoology and paleontology. It was during this period, in 1862 in Athens, Heldreich met John Stuart Mill who was travelling through Greece with his stepdaughter, Helen Taylor (feminist), collecting specimens of the Greek flora. Heldreich and Mill discussed plant identifications and exchanged collections. Their meeting is documented in John Stuart Mill's botanical notebooks lodged in the Archives of the London School of Economics.

A portion of the John Stuart Mill Herbarium, believed to be in the vicinity of 4000 specimens, is housed at the National Herbarium of Victoria (MEL) and within this portion are contained a set of Heldreich specimens, primarily from the Attica and Crete regions of Greece.

Heldreich discovered seven new genera and 700 new species of plants, 70 of which bear his name.

Between 1880 and 1883 he taught natural history to the children of the royal family.

In 1855 Theodor von Heldreich married Sofia, daughter of I. Katakouzinos and granddaughter of Greek scholar and patriot, Konstantinos Koumas. With Sofia he had two daughters, Karolina, who married Gangolf von Kieseritzky, Curator of Antiquities at the Imperial Hermitage Museum in St. Petersburg, and Ioanna, who married Mark Mindler, attorney and head of the stenographer's office of the Greek Parliament. Theodor von Heldreich was a good friend of Charles Darwin.

He died in Athens on 7 September 1902. His grave can still be found in the First Cemetery of Athens.

== Standard author abbreviation ==
The standard author abbreviation Heldr. is used to indicate this person as the author when citing a botanical name.

== Published works ==
In addition to a great number of monographs published in reputable journals in Greece and abroad, he also published scholarly works in Greek, Latin, German, Italian and French, including:

♦ "Ueber Griechische Arbutus Arten" (1844)
♦ "Catalogus Plantarum Hispanicarum in Provincia Giennensi" (1850)
♦ "Ueber die neue arkadische Tanne" (1860)
♦ "Descriptio specierum novarum" (1860)
♦ "Zur Kenntniss der griechischen Tannen" (1861)
♦ "Ueber Pflanzen der griechischen, insbesondere der Attischen Flora, die als Zierpflanzen empfehlenswerthsind" (1861)
♦ "Tulipa Orphanidea Boiss und die Tulpen Griechenlands" (1862)
♦ "Die Nutzpflanzen Griechenlands" with particular reference to modern Greek and Pelasgic common names (Athens 1862)
♦ "Sertulum plantarum novarum vel. minus cognitarum Florae Hellenicae" (Florence 1876)
♦ "Zwei neue Pflanzenarten der Jonischen Inseln" (Vienna, 1877)
♦ "Ueber die Liliaceen-Gattung Leopoldia und ihre Arten" (Moscow 1878)
♦ "La Faune de la Grèce" (Athens 1878)
♦ "Der Asphodelos, ein griechisches Pflanzenbild" (Berlin 1881)
♦ "Flore de l'ile de Céphalonie" (Lausanne 1883)
♦ "On a Botanical Excursion in Attica" (Athens 1883)
♦ "Bericht über die botanischen Ergebaisse einer Bereisung Thessaliens" (Berlin 1883)
♦ "On the Hyoscyamus" (Athens 1884)
♦ "On the Hop (Humulus lupulus) and its cultivation in Greece" (Athens 1885)
♦ "Note sur une nouvelle espèce de Centaurea de l'ile de Crète" (Paris 1890)
♦ "The Flora of Mt. Parnassus" (Athens 1890)
♦ "Homeric Flora" (Athens 1896)
♦ "Study on the Pellitory (Parietaria), a Medicinal Herb of the Ancients" (Athens 1899)
♦ "The Flora of Aegina" (Athens, 1898)
♦ "On the Strychnos of the Ancients" (Athens, 1899)
♦ "The Flora of Thera" (Athens 1899)
♦ "On the Plants Providing Greek Tea" (Athens 1900)
♦ "Botany in Relation to Mathematics" (Athens 1901)
♦ "Contributions to the Compilation of a Flora of the Cyclades" (Athens 1901)
♦ "Fungi in the Economy of Nature" (Athens 1901).

In 1880, he published a romance entitled "Mussinitza", in 1887 "A Sketch on the Death of Professor of Botany and Poet Theodoros G. Orphanides", in 1887 "The Flower, from a Historical, Natural and Aesthetic Viewpoint", and in 1889 "The Lily, Examined from a Fictional and Historical Perspective". Heldrich also published an exsiccata-like specimen series under the title "Reliquiae Orphanideae curante Th. de Heldreich anno 188. emissae".

== Eponymy ==
The plant genus Heldreichia (endemic to Turkey with 3 species) the plant taxa Acer heldreichii, Allium heldreichii, Carum heldreichii, Chaerophyllum heldreichii, Centaurea heldreichii, Cirsium heldreichii, Crepis heldreichiana, Helichrysum heldreichii, Hieracium heldreichii, Alyssum heldreichii, Jasione heldreichii, Trifolium heldreichianum, Ramonda heldreichii, Muscari heldreichii, Juncus heldreichianus, Gagea heldreichii, Alcea heldreichii, Goniolimon heldreichii, Myosurus heldreichii, Crataegus heldreichii, Galium heldreichii, Viola heldreichiana, Pinus heldreichii, Isoetes heldreichii, the praying mantis Ameles heldreichi, and the grasshopper Glyphotmethis heldreichi are some species named after him.

== Bibliography ==
- Vlahakis, George N.; Economou-Amilli, Athina (2012). Botany in Greece During the 19th Century: A Periphery at the Center. Istanbul, Turkey: Osmanlı Bilimi Araştırmaları XIII/2.
