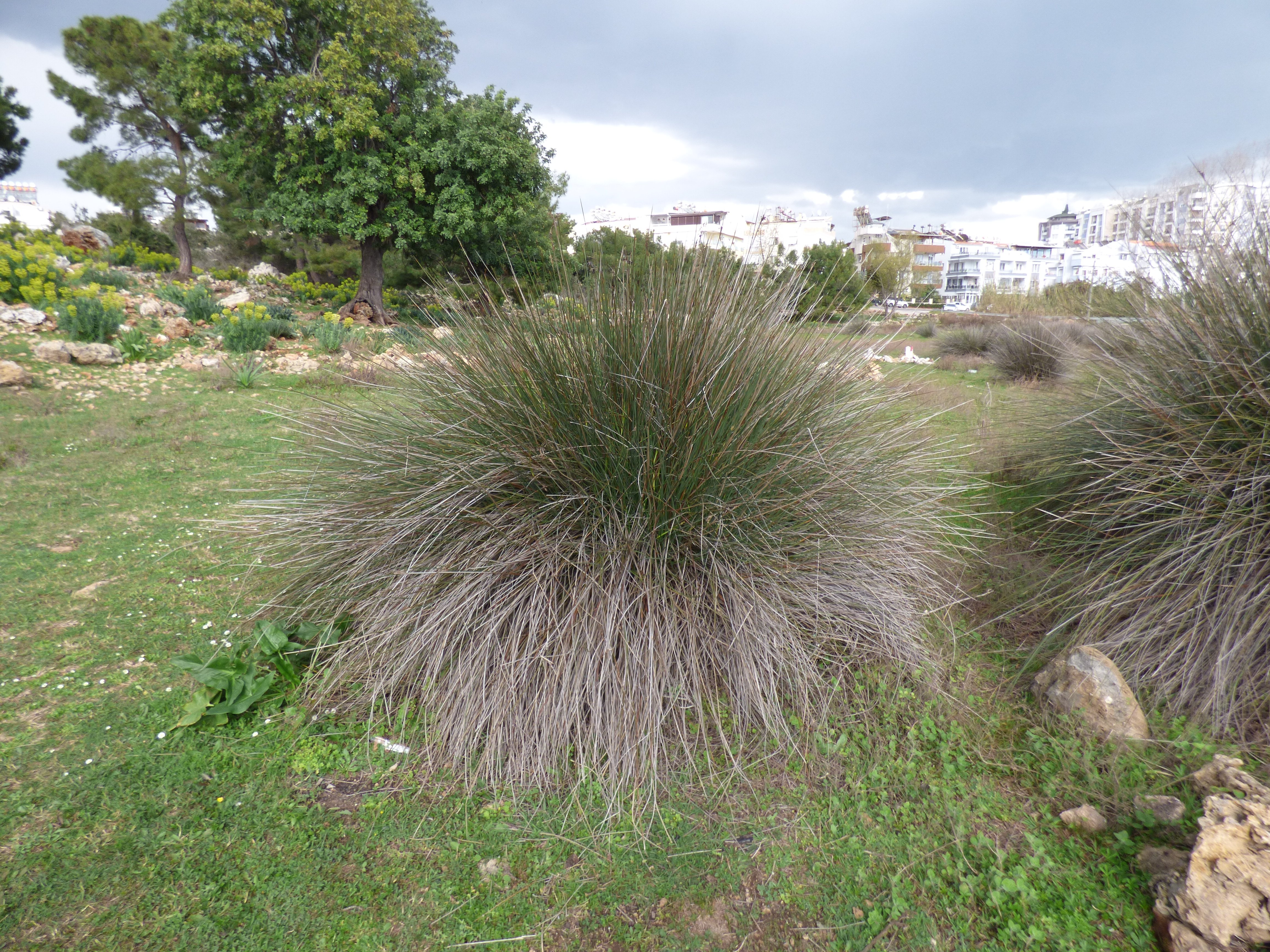
- Juncus heldreichianus subsp. heldreichianus from Antalya showing size, solitary form and arching lower parts

Scientific classification
- Kingdom: Plantae
- Clade: Tracheophytes
- Clade: Angiosperms
- Clade: Monocots
- Clade: Commelinids
- Order: Poales
- Family: Juncaceae
- Genus: Juncus
- Species: J. heldreichianus

Binomial name
- Juncus heldreichianus T.Marsson ex Parl.

= Juncus heldreichianus =

Species of plant

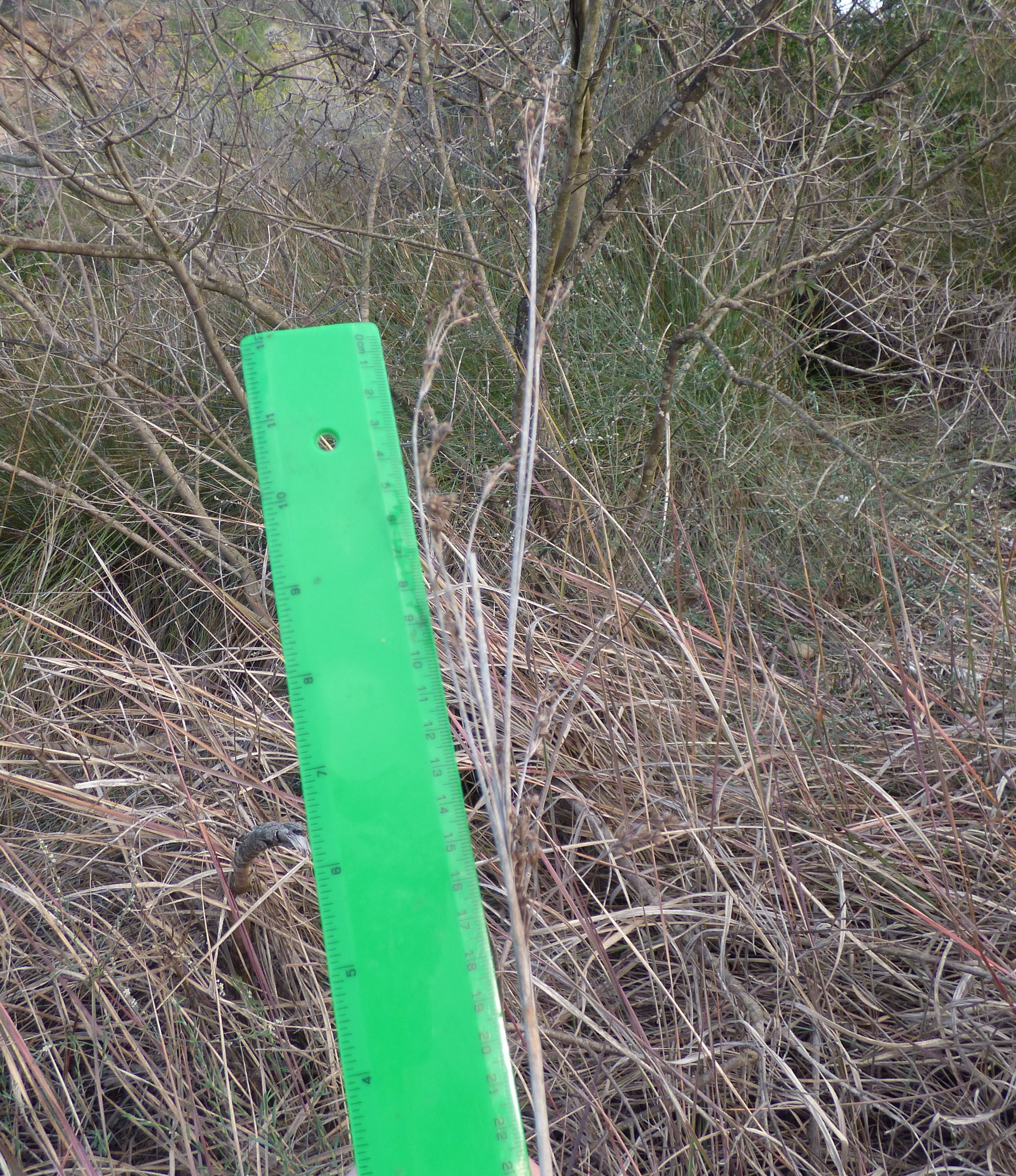
Elongated inflorescence of subsp. heldreichianus

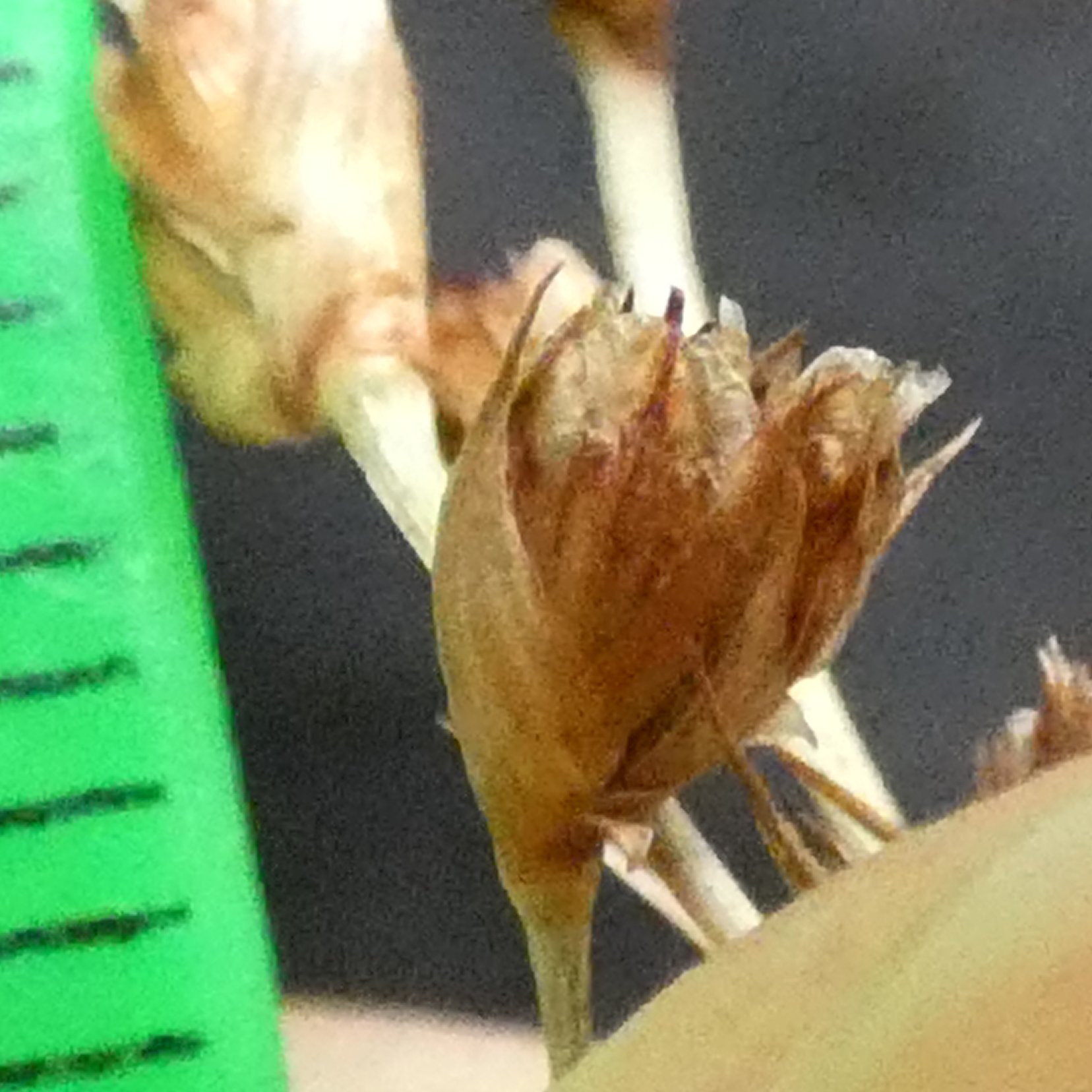
Pale-winged inner 3 tepals (subsp. heldreichianus)

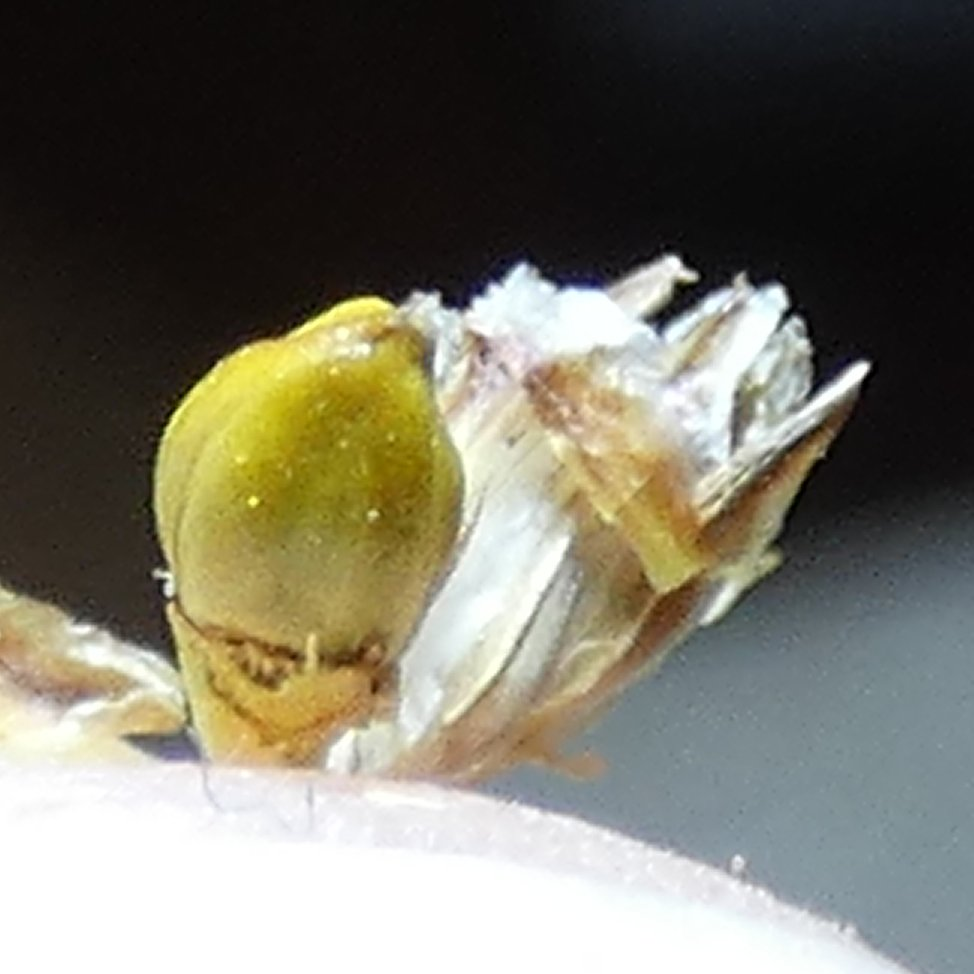
Blunt-edged/tipped fruit (subsp. heldreichianus)

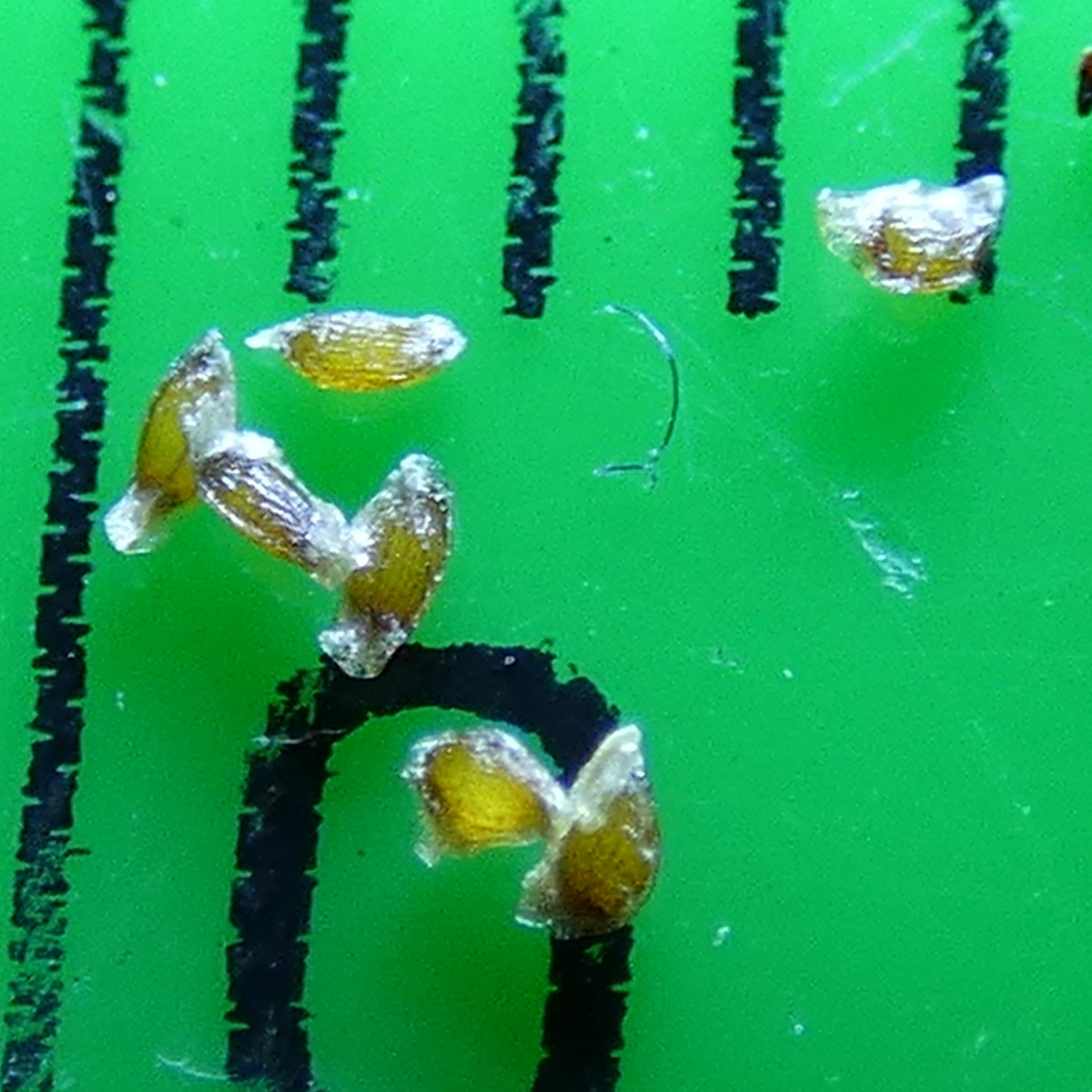
Small seeds (subsp. heldreichianus)

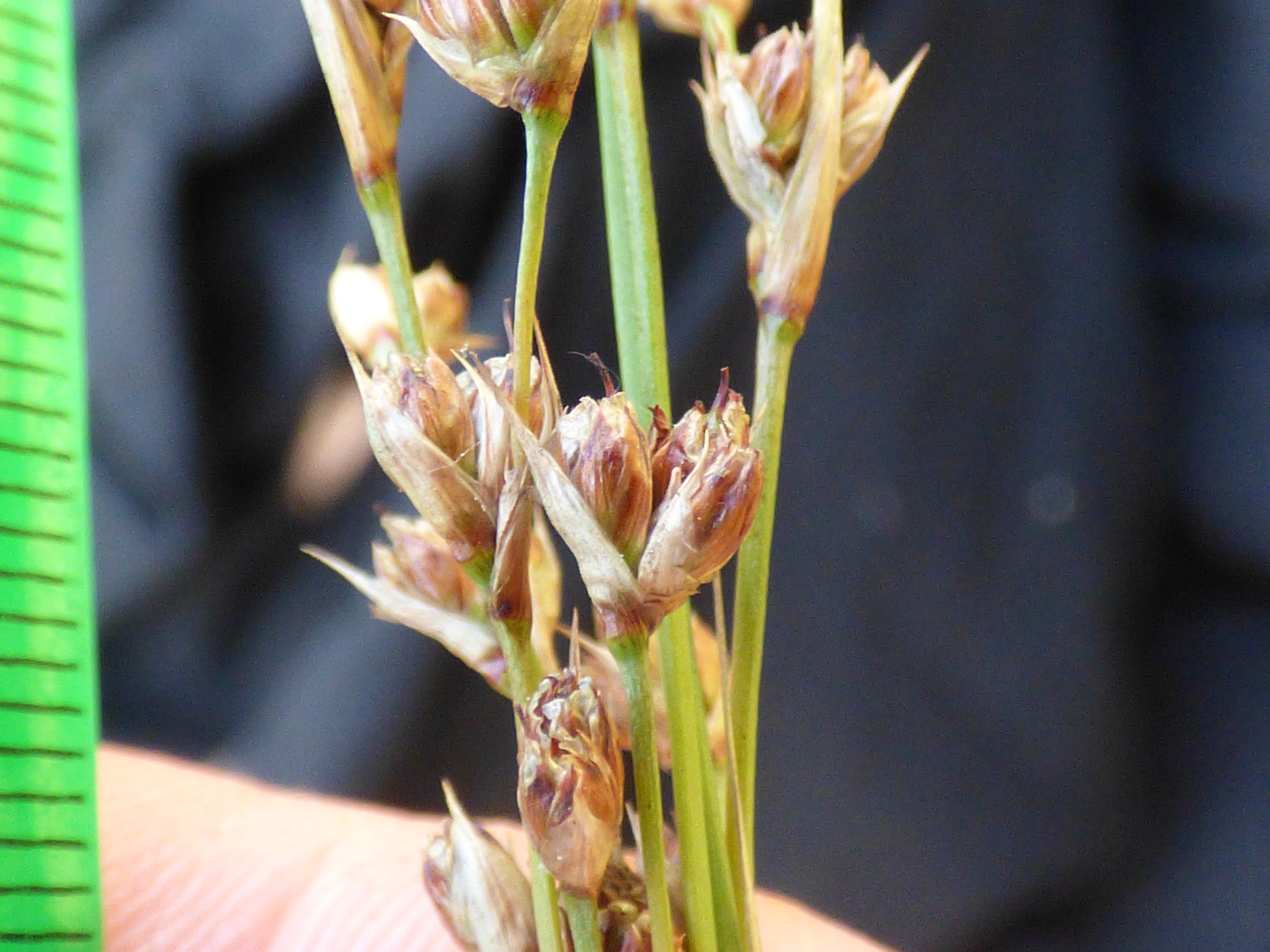
Large terminal bracts (subsp. heldreichianus)

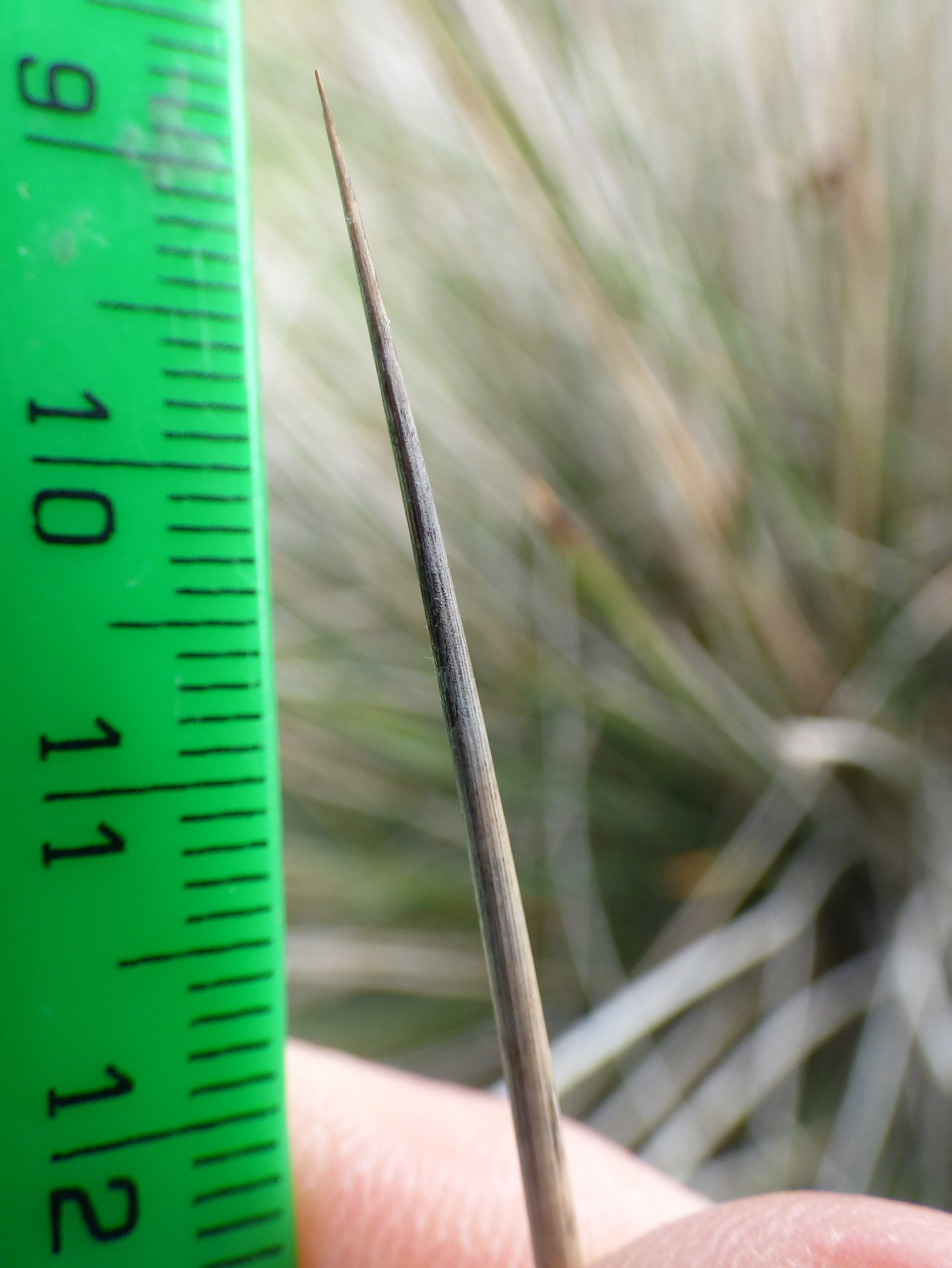
Pointed tips (subsp. heldreichianus)

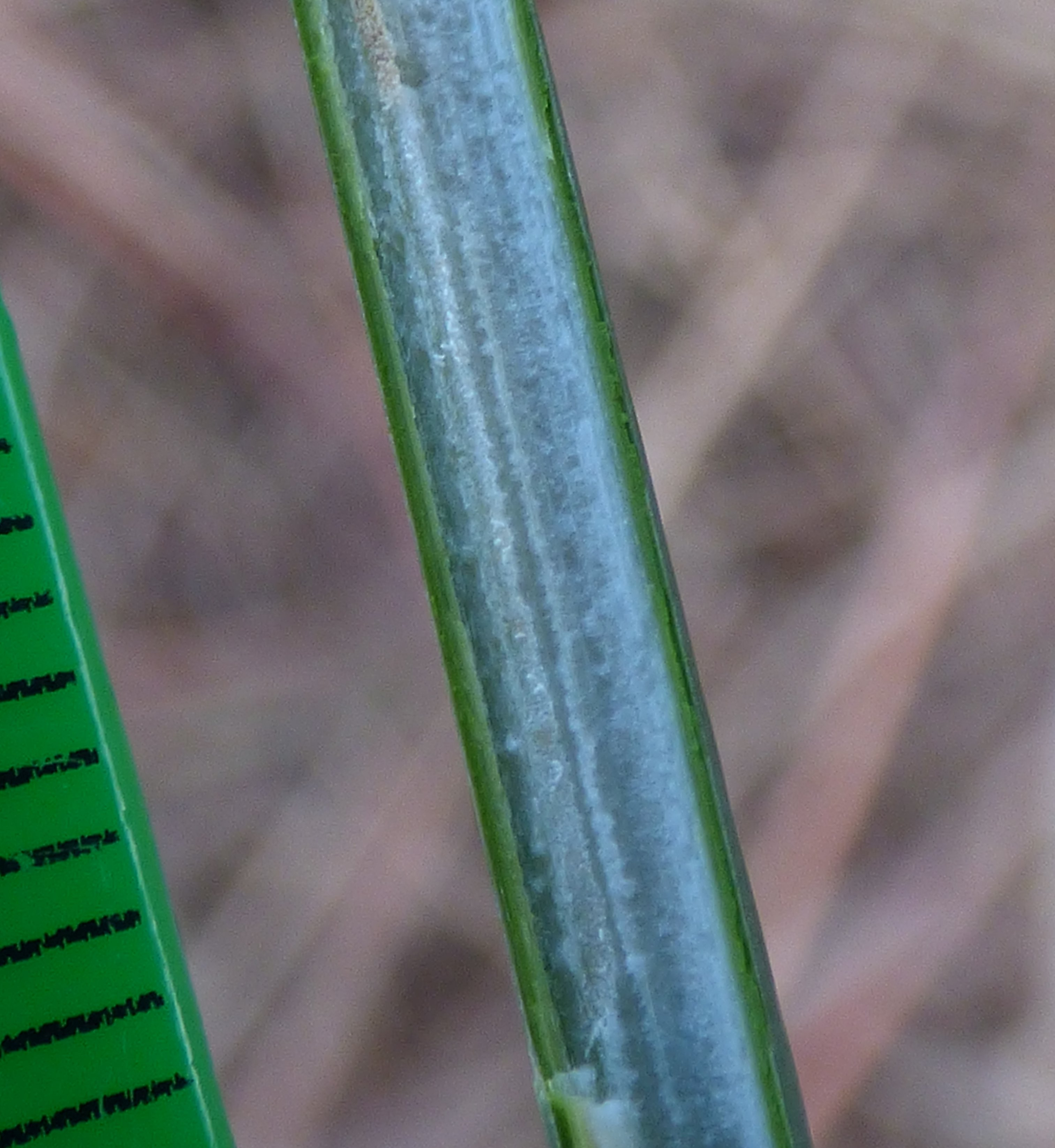
Unbroken pith (subsp. heldreichianus)

Juncus heldreichianus is a large tufted species of rush in the family Juncaceae, formed of two subspecies.

== Description ==
A large, densely-stemmed rush, forming individualised (poorly-creeping) plants; subsp. heldreichianus attains 100–150 cm with rather arching stems, subsp. orientalis reaches 70 cm.

Inflorescences for subsp. heldreichianus are usually long and narrow, appearing stretched-out, with well-spaced lax floral heads (therefore resembling J. maritimus, which however usually forms creeping patches), whilst for subsp. orientalis the inflorescence is composed of a closer spray of well-separated heads of flowers.

The individual flowers have 6 tepals typical of the genus Juncus, but with the inner 3 with broad pale margins, notched at the top, the flowers having an over all light brown colour (J. littoralis being dark brown).

The mature fruit capsules are up to 4 mm (J. acutus 4–6 mm) with blunt seams converging as a blunt tip (J. littoralis having sharp seams converging to a sharp pyramidal tip).

Seeds are small (0.8-0.9 mm long, 1.0-1.5 mm with appendages) compared to J. littoralis (0.8-1.1 mm long, 1.5-2.0 with appendages).

== Range ==
Species - Albania, Cyprus, East Aegean Is., Greece, Iran, Kriti, Lebanon-Syria, Tadzhikistan, Transcaucasus, Turkey, Turkey-in-Europe, Turkmenistan.

Juncus heldreichianus subsp. heldreichianus - Albania, Cyprus, East Aegean Is., Greece, Kriti, Turkey, Turkey-in-Europe.

Juncus heldreichianus subsp. orientalis - Iran, Lebanon-Syria, Tadzhikistan, Transcaucasus, Turkey, Turkmenistan.

== Habitat ==
Juncus heldreichianus subsp. heldreichianus - Sand dunes, sandy places, salt and freshwater marshes, along streams, from sea level to 1700 m.

Juncus heldreichianus subsp. orientalis - Permanently or seasonally wet places, slightly to strongly saline habitats, known from sites between 800 and 1700 m.
