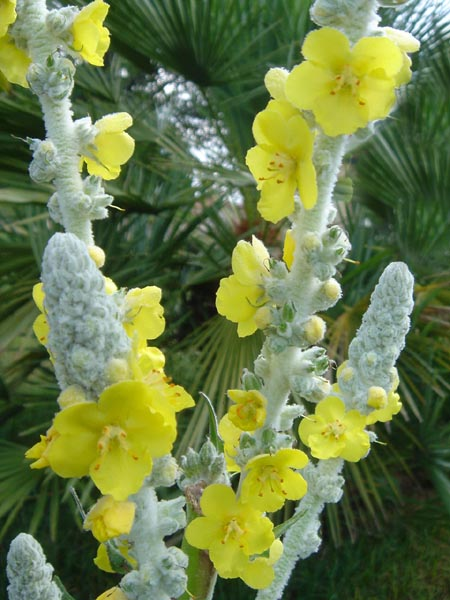
- Inflorescences
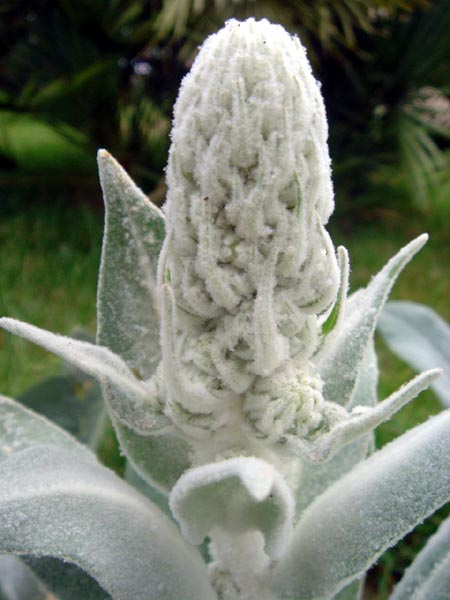
- Preparing to bloom

Scientific classification
- Kingdom: Plantae
- Clade: Embryophytes
- Clade: Tracheophytes
- Clade: Angiosperms
- Clade: Eudicots
- Clade: Asterids
- Order: Lamiales
- Family: Scrophulariaceae
- Genus: Verbascum
- Species: V. bombyciferum

Binomial name
- Verbascum bombyciferum Boiss.

Synonyms
- Verbascum bombyciforme Boiss.

= Verbascum bombyciferum =

Species of flowering plant

Verbascum bombyciferum, called the giant silver mullein, Turkish mullein and Broussa mullein, is a species of flowering plant in the genus Verbascum, native to Turkey, and introduced to California, Great Britain and Germany. It is considered a good plant to attract pollinators. With Verbascum chaixii it is a parent of the 'Pink Domino' cultivar, which has gained the Royal Horticultural Society's Award of Garden Merit.
