= List of superrosids of Great Britain and Ireland =

This page covers a group of dicotyledon families of the clade Superrosids. For the background to this list see parent article List of the vascular plants of Britain and Ireland.

Status key: * indicates an introduced species and e indicates an extinct species. This division of the eudicots is shown in the following cladogram:

- eudicots
  - basal eudicots
    (paraphyletic group: Ranunculales, Proteales, Trochodendrales, Buxales)
  - core eudicots
    - Gunnerales
    - Pentapetalae
      - Dilleniales
      - - superrosids
          - Saxifragales
          - rosids
            - Vitales
            - eurosids
              - fabids
              - malvids
        - superasterids
          - Santalales
          - - Berberidopsidales
            - - Caryophyllales
              - asterids
                - Cornales
                - - Ericales
                  - euasterids
                    - campanulids
                    - lamiids

== Order Saxifragales ==
=== Family Grossulariaceae (currant family) ===
English name	Scientific name	Status
Red currant	Ribes rubrum	*
Downy currant	Ribes spicatum	
Black currant	Ribes nigrum	
Flowering currant	Ribes sanguineum	*
Buffalo currant	Ribes odoratum	*
Mountain currant	Ribes alpinum	
Gooseberry	Ribes uva-crispa	

=== Family Haloragaceae (watermilfoil family) ===
English name	Scientific name	Status
Creeping raspwort	Haloragis micrantha	*
Whorled water-milfoil	Myriophyllum verticillatum	
Parrot's-feather	Myriophyllum aquaticum	*
Spiked water-milfoil	Myriophyllum spicatum	
Alternate water-milfoil	Myriophyllum alterniflorum	

=== Family Crassulaceae (stonecrop or orpine family) ===
English name	Scientific name	Status
Mossy stonecrop	Crassula tillaea	
Pigmyweed	Crassula aquatica	
New Zealand pigmyweed	Crassula helmsii	*
Scilly pigmyweed	Crassula decumbens	*
Jersey pigmyweed	Crassula pubescens	*
Navelwort	Umbilicus rupestris	
House-leek	Sempervivum tectorum	*
Aeonium	Aeonium cuneatum	*
Roseroot	Rhodiola rosea	
Butterfly stonecrop	Hylotelephium spectabile	*
Orpine	Hylotelephium telephium	
Greater Mexican-stonecrop	Sedum praealtum	*
Lesser Mexican-stonecrop	Sedum confusum	*
Love-restoring stonecrop	Sedum anacampseros	*
Caucasian-stonecrop	Sedum spurium	*
Lesser Caucasian-stonecrop	Sedum stoloniferum	*
Pale stonecrop	Sedum sediforme	*
Reflexed stonecrop	Sedum reflexum	*
Rock stonecrop	Sedum forsterianum	
Biting stonecrop	Sedum acre	
Tasteless stonecrop	Sedum sexangulare	*
White stonecrop	Sedum album	
Least stonecrop	Sedum lydium	*
English stonecrop	Sedum anglicum	
Thick-leaved stonecrop	Sedum dasyphyllum	*
Hairy stonecrop	Sedum villosum	
Spanish stonecrop	Sedum hispanicum	*

=== Family Saxifragaceae (saxifrage family) ===
English name	Scientific name	Status
False-buck's-beard	Astilbe japonica	*
Tall false-buck's-beard	Astilbe rivularis	*
Rodgersia	Rodgersia podophylla	*
Elephant-ears	Bergenia crassifolia	*
Indian-rhubarb	Darmera peltata	*
Starry saxifrage	Micranthes stellaris, syn. Saxifraga stellaris	
Marsh saxifrage	Saxifraga hirculus	
Celandine saxifrage	Saxifraga cymbalaria	*
Alpine saxifrage	Saxifraga nivalis	
Strawberry saxifrage	Saxifraga stolonifera	*
Round-leaved saxifrage	Saxifraga rotundifolia	*
Lesser Londonpride	Saxifraga cuneifolia	*
Pyrenean saxifrage	Saxifraga umbrosa	*
St Patrick's-cabbage	Saxifraga spathularis	
Kidney saxifrage	Saxifraga hirsuta	
Purple saxifrage	Saxifraga oppositifolia	
Yellow saxifrage	Saxifraga aizoides	
Highland saxifrage	Saxifraga rivularis	
Drooping saxifrage	Saxifraga cernua	
Meadow saxifrage	Saxifraga granulata	
Mossy saxifrage	Saxifraga hypnoides	
Irish saxifrage	Saxifraga rosacea	
Tufted saxifrage	Saxifraga cespitosa	
Rue-leaved saxifrage	Saxifraga tridactylites	
Coralbells	Heuchera sanguinea	*
Pick-a-back-plant	Tolmiea menziesii	*
Fringecups	Tellima grandiflora	*
Opposite-leaved golden-saxifrage	Chrysosplenium oppositifolium	
Alternate-leaved golden-saxifrage	Chrysosplenium alternifolium	

=== Family Paeoniaceae (peonies) ===
English name	Scientific name	Status
Peony	Paeonia mascula	*

== Rosids ==
=== Order Vitales ===
==== Family Vitaceae (grape family) ====
English name	Scientific name	Status
Grape-vine	Vitis vinifera	*
Virginia-creeper	Parthenocissus quinquefolia	*
False Virginia-creeper	Parthenocissus inserta	*
Boston-ivy	Parthenocissus tricuspidata	*

=== Fabids ===
==== Order Rosales ====
===== Family Ulmaceae (elm family) =====
English name	Scientific name	Status
Wych elm	Ulmus glabra	
English elm	Ulmus procera	
Small-leaved elm	Ulmus minor	
Plot's elm	Ulmus plotii	

===== Family Cannabaceae (hemp family) =====
English name	Scientific name	Status
Hemp	Cannabis sativa	*
Hop	Humulus lupulus	

===== Family Moraceae (mulberry family, fig family) =====
English name	Scientific name	Status
Black mulberry	Morus nigra	*
Fig	Ficus carica	*

===== Family Urticaceae (nettle family) =====
English name	Scientific name	Status
Common nettle	Urtica dioica	
Small nettle	Urtica urens	
Pellitory-of-the-wall	Parietaria judaica	
Mind-your-own-business	Soleirolia soleirolii	*

==== Order Fagales ====
===== Family Juglandaceae (walnut family) =====
English name	Scientific name	Status
Persian walnut	Juglans regia	*
Caucasian wingnut	Pterocarya fraxinifolia	*

===== Family Myricaceae (wax myrtle family) =====
English name	Scientific name	Status
Bog-myrtle	Myrica gale	
Bayberry	Myrica pensylvanica	*

===== Family Fagaceae (beech and oak family) =====
English name	Scientific name	Status
European beech	Fagus sylvatica	
Sweet chestnut	Castanea sativa	*
Turkey oak	Quercus cerris	*
Holm oak	Quercus ilex	*
Algerian oak	Quercus canariensis	*
Sessile oak	Quercus petraea	
Pedunculate oak	Quercus robur	
Red oak	Quercus rubra	*
Roble	Nothofagus obliqua	*
Rauli	Nothofagus alpina	*

===== Family Betulaceae (birch family) =====
English name	Scientific name	Status
Silver birch	Betula pendula	
Downy birch	Betula pubescens	
Dwarf birch	Betula nana	
Alder	Alnus glutinosa	
Grey alder	Alnus incana	*
Italian alder	Alnus cordata	*
Hornbeam	Carpinus betulus	
Hazel	Corylus avellana	
Filbert	Corylus maxima	*

===== Family Amaranthaceae (amaranth family) =====
English name	Scientific name	Status
Mexican-tea	Chenopodium ambrosioides	*
Clammy goosefoot	Chenopodium pumilio	*
Strawberry-blite	Chenopodium capitatum	*
Good-King-Henry	Chenopodium bonus-henricus	*
Oak-leaved goosefoot	Chenopodium glaucum	*
Red goosefoot	Chenopodium rubrum	
Saltmarsh goosefoot	Chenopodium chenopodioides	
Many-seeded goosefoot	Chenopodium polyspermum	
Stinking goosefoot	Chenopodium vulvaria	
Maple-leaved goosefoot	Chenopodium hybridum	
Upright goosefoot	Chenopodium urbicum	
Nettle-leaved goosefoot	Chenopodium murale	
Fig-leaved goosefoot	Chenopodium ficifolium	
Grey goosefoot	Chenopodium opulifolium	*
Fat-hen	Chenopodium album	
Summer-cypress	Bassia scoparia	*
Garden orache	Atriplex hortensis	*
Spear-leaved orache	Atriplex prostrata	
Babington's orache	Atriplex glabriuscula	
Long-stalked orache	Atriplex longipes	
Early orache	Atriplex praecox	
Grass-leaved orache	Atriplex littoralis	
Common orache	Atriplex patula	
Frosted orache	Atriplex laciniata	
Shrubby orache	Atriplex halimus	*
Sea-purslane	Atriplex portulacoides	
Pedunculate sea-purslane	Atriplex pedunculata	
Beet	Beta vulgaris	
Caucasian beet	Beta trigyna	*
Perennial glasswort	Salicornia perennis	
One-flowered glasswort	Salicornia pusilla	
Purple glasswort	Salicornia ramosissima	
Common glasswort	Salicornia europaea	
Glaucous glasswort	Salicornia obscura	
Shiny glasswort	Salicornia nitens	
Yellow glasswort	Salicornia fragilis	
Long-spiked glasswort	Salicornia dolichostachya	
Shrubby sea-blite	Suaeda vera	
Annual sea-blite	Suaeda maritima	
Prickly saltwort	Salsola kali	
Common amaranth	Amaranthus retroflexus	*
Green amaranth	Amaranthus hybridus	*
Purple amaranth	Amaranthus cruentus	*
Indehiscent amaranth	Amaranthus bouchonii	*
Perennial pigweed	Amaranthus deflexus	*
White pigweed	Amaranthus albus	*

===== Family Portulacaceae (purslane family) =====
English name	Scientific name	Status
Common purslane	Portulaca oleracea	*
Springbeauty	Claytonia perfoliata	*
Pink purslane	Claytonia sibirica	*
Blinks	Montia fontana	
Small-leaved blinks	Montia parvifolia	*

===== Family Caryophyllaceae (pink and carnation family) =====
English name	Scientific name	Status
Thyme-leaved sandwort	Arenaria serpyllifolia	
Arctic sandwort	Arenaria norvegica	
Fringed sandwort	Arenaria ciliata	
Mossy sandwort	Arenaria balearica	*
Mountain sandwort	Arenaria montana	*
Three-nerved sandwort	Moehringia trinervia	
Sea sandwort	Honckenya peploides	
Recurved sandwort	Minuartia recurva	
Spring sandwort	Minuartia verna	
Mountain sandwort	Minuartia rubella	
Teesdale sandwort	Minuartia stricta	
Fine-leaved sandwort	Minuartia hybrida	
Cyphel	Minuartia sedoides	
Wood stitchwort	Stellaria nemorum	
Common chickweed	Stellaria media	
Lesser chickweed	Stellaria pallida	
Greater chickweed	Stellaria neglecta	
Greater stitchwort	Stellaria holostea	
Marsh stitchwort	Stellaria palustris	
Lesser stitchwort	Stellaria graminea	
Bog stitchwort	Stellaria uliginosa	
Jagged chickweed	Holosteum umbellatum	e
Starwort mouse-ear	Cerastium cerastoides	
Field mouse-ear	Cerastium arvense	
Snow-in-summer	Cerastium tomentosum	*
Alpine mouse-ear	Cerastium alpinum	
Arctic mouse-ear	Cerastium arcticum	
Shetland mouse-ear	Cerastium nigrescens	
Common mouse-ear	Cerastium fontanum	
Sticky mouse-ear	Cerastium glomeratum	
Grey mouse-ear	Cerastium brachypetalum	*
Sea mouse-ear	Cerastium diffusum	
Dwarf mouse-ear	Cerastium pumilum	
Little mouse-ear	Cerastium semidecandrum	
Water chickweed	Myosoton aquaticum	
Upright chickweed	Moenchia erecta	
Knotted pearlwort	Sagina nodosa	
Snow pearlwort	Sagina nivalis	
Heath pearlwort	Sagina subulata	
Alpine pearlwort	Sagina saginoides	
Procumbent pearlwort	Sagina procumbens	
Boyd's pearlwort	Sagina boydii	e
Annual pearlwort	Sagina apetala	
Sea pearlwort	Sagina maritima	
Perennial knawel	Scleranthus perennis	
Annual knawel	Scleranthus annuus	
Strapwort	Corrigiola litoralis	
Smooth rupturewort	Herniaria glabra	
Fringed rupturewort	Herniaria ciliolata	
Hairy rupturewort	Herniaria hirsuta	*
Coral-necklace	Illecebrum verticillatum	
Four-leaved allseed	Polycarpon tetraphyllum	
Corn spurrey	Spergula arvensis	*
Pearlwort spurrey	Spergula morisonii	*
Rock sea-spurrey	Spergularia rupicola	
Greater sea-spurrey	Spergularia media	
Lesser sea-spurrey	Spergularia marina	
Sand spurrey	Spergularia rubra	
Greek sea-spurrey	Spergularia bocconei	
Rose campion	Lychnis coronaria	*
Ragged-robin	Lychnis flos-cuculi	
Sticky catchfly	Lychnis viscaria	
Alpine catchfly	Lychnis alpina	
Corncockle	Agrostemma githago	*
Italian catchfly	Silene italica	*
Nottingham catchfly	Silene nutans	
Spanish catchfly	Silene otites	
Bladder campion	Silene vulgaris	
Sea campion	Silene uniflora	
Moss campion	Silene acaulis	
Sweet-William catchfly	Silene armeria	*
Night-flowering catchfly	Silene noctiflora	
White campion	Silene latifolia	
Red campion	Silene dioica	
Small-flowered catchfly	Silene gallica	
Sand catchfly	Silene conica	
Berry catchfly	Cucubalus baccifer	*
Soapwort	Saponaria officinalis	
Rock soapwort	Saponaria ocymoides	*
Cowherb	Vaccaria hispanica	*
Childing pink	Petrorhagia nanteuilii	
Proliferous pink	Petrorhagia prolifera	
Tunicflower	Petrorhagia saxifraga	*
Cheddar pink	Dianthus gratianopolitanus	
Clove pink	Dianthus caryophyllus	*
Pink	Dianthus plumarius	*
Jersey pink	Dianthus gallicus	*
Maiden pink	Dianthus deltoides	
Sweet William	Dianthus barbatus	*
Deptford pink	Dianthus armeria	

===== Family Polygonaceae (knotweed family) =====
English name	Scientific name	Status
Alpine knotweed	Koenigia alpina	*
Himalayan knotweed	Koenigia polystachya syn. Persicaria wallichii	*
Chinese knotweed	Koenigia weyrichii	*
Lesser knotweed	Koenigia campanulata syn. Persicaria campanulata	*
Soft knotweed	Koenigia mollis (syn. Persicaria mollis)	*
Common bistort	Persicaria bistorta	
Red bistort	Persicaria amplexicaulis	*
Alpine bistort	Persicaria vivipara	
Amphibious bistort	Persicaria amphibia	
Nepal persicaria	Persicaria nepalensis	*
Redshank	Persicaria maculosa	*
Pale persicaria	Persicaria lapathifolia	
Pinkweed	Persicaria pensylvanica	*
Water-pepper	Persicaria hydropiper	
Tasteless water-pepper	Persicaria mitis	
Small water-pepper	Persicaria minor	
American tearthumb	Persicaria sagittata	*
Iceland-purslane	Koenigia islandica	
Buckwheat	Fagopyrum esculentum	*
Tall buckwheat	Fagopyrum dibotrys	*
Sea knotgrass	Polygonum maritimum	
Ray's knotgrass	Polygonum oxyspermum	
Equal-leaved knotgrass	Polygonum arenastrum	
Knotgrass	Polygonum aviculare	
Northern knotgrass	Polygonum boreale	
Cornfield knotgrass	Polygonum rurivagum	
Japanese knotweed	Reynoutria japonica (syn. Fallopia japonica)	*
Giant knotweed	Reynoutria sachalinensis	*
Russian-vine	Fallopia baldschuanica	*
Black-bindweed	Fallopia convolvulus	
Copse-bindweed	Fallopia dumetorum	
Wireplant	Muehlenbeckia complexa	*
Sheep's sorrel	Rumex acetosella	
French sorrel	Rumex scutatus	*
Common sorrel	Rumex acetosa	
Willow-leaved dock	Rumex salicifolius	*
Argentine dock	Rumex frutescens	*
Monk's-rhubarb	Rumex pseudoalpinus	*
Scottish dock	Rumex aquaticus	
Northern dock	Rumex longifolius	
Russian dock	Rumex confertus	*
Water dock	Rumex hydrolapathum	
Greek dock	Rumex cristatus	*
Patience dock	Rumex patientia	*
Curled dock	Rumex crispus	
Clustered dock	Rumex conglomeratus	
Wood dock	Rumex sanguineus	
Shore dock	Rumex rupestris	
Hooked dock	Rumex brownii	*
Fiddle dock	Rumex pulcher	
Broad-leaved dock	Rumex obtusifolius	
Marsh dock	Rumex palustris	
Golden dock	Rumex maritimus	
Mountain sorrel	Oxyria digyna	

===== Family Plumbaginaceae (leadwort family) =====
English name	Scientific name	Status
Common sea-lavender	Limonium vulgare	
Lax-flowered sea-lavender	Limonium humile	
Matted sea-lavender	Limonium bellidifolium	
Broad-leaved sea-lavender	Limonium auriculae-ursifolium	
Alderney sea-lavender	Limonium normannicum	
Rottingdean sea-lavender	Limonium hyblaeum	*
A rock sea-lavender	Limonium binervosum	
A rock sea-lavender	Limonium paradoxum	
A rock sea-lavender	Limonium procerum	
A rock sea-lavender	Limonium britannicum	
A rock sea-lavender	Limonium parvum	
A rock sea-lavender	Limonium loganicum	
A rock sea-lavender	Limonium transwallianum	
A rock sea-lavender	Limonium dodartiforme	
A rock sea-lavender	Limonium recurvum	
Thrift	Armeria maritima	
Jersey thrift	Armeria arenaria	

===== Family Droseraceae (sundew family) =====
English name	Scientific name	Status
Round-leaved sundew	Drosera rotundifolia	
Great sundew	Drosera anglica	
Oblong-leaved sundew	Drosera intermedia	

===== Family Tamaricaceae (tamarisk family) =====
English name	Scientific name	Status
Tamarisk	Tamarix gallica	*

===== Family Frankeniaceae (sea-heath) =====
English name	Scientific name	Status
Sea-heath	Frankenia laevis	

==== Order Malpighiales ====
===== Family Elatinaceae (waterworts) =====
English name	Scientific name	Status
Six-stamened waterwort	Elatine hexandra	
Eight-stamened waterwort	Elatine hydropiper	

===== Family Clusiaceae (garcinia family) =====
English name	Scientific name	Status
Rose-of-Sharon	Hypericum calycinum	*
Irish tutsan	Hypericum pseudohenryi	*
Tutsan	Hypericum androsaemum	
Stinking tutsan	Hypericum hircinum	*
Turkish tutsan	Hypericum xylosteifolium	*
Perforate St John's-wort	Hypericum perforatum	
Imperforate St John's-wort	Hypericum maculatum	
Wavy St John's-wort	Hypericum undulatum	
Square-stalked St John's-wort	Hypericum tetrapterum	
Trailing St John's-wort	Hypericum humifusum	
Toadflax-leaved St John's-wort	Hypericum linariifolium	
Slender St John's-wort	Hypericum pulchrum	
Round-leaved St John's-wort	Hypericum nummularium	*
Hairy St John's-wort	Hypericum hirsutum	
Pale St John's-wort	Hypericum montanum	
Marsh St John's-wort	Hypericum elodes	
Irish St John's-wort	Hypericum canadense	*

===== Family Violaceae (violet and pansy family) =====
English name	Scientific name	Status
Sweet violet	Viola odorata	
Hairy violet	Viola hirta	
Teesdale violet	Viola rupestris	
Common dog-violet	Viola riviniana	
Early dog-violet	Viola reichenbachiana	
Heath dog-violet	Viola canina	
Pale dog-violet	Viola lactea	
Fen violet	Viola persicifolia	
Marsh violet	Viola palustris	
Horned pansy	Viola cornuta	*
Mountain pansy	Viola lutea	
Wild pansy	Viola tricolor	
Field pansy	Viola arvensis	
Dwarf pansy	Viola kitaibeliana	

===== Family Salicaceae (willow family) =====
English name	Scientific name	Status
White poplar	Populus alba	*
Aspen	Populus tremula	
Black poplar	Populus nigra	
Western balsam poplar	Populus trichocarpa	*
Bay willow	Salix pentandra	
Crack willow	Salix fragilis	
White willow	Salix alba	
Almond willow	Salix triandra	
Purple willow	Salix purpurea	
European violet willow	Salix daphnoides	*
Siberian violet willow	Salix acutifolia	*
Sachalin willow	Salix udensis	*
Osier	Salix viminalis	
Goat willow	Salix caprea	
Grey willow	Salix cinerea	
Eared willow	Salix aurita	
Heart-leaved willow	Salix eriocephala	*
Dark-leaved willow	Salix myrsinifolia	
Tea-leaved willow	Salix phylicifolia	
Creeping willow	Salix repens	
Downy willow	Salix lapponum	
Woolly willow	Salix lanata	
Mountain willow	Salix arbuscula	
Whortle-leaved willow	Salix myrsinites	
Dwarf willow	Salix herbacea	
Net-leaved willow	Salix reticulata	

=== Malvids ===
==== Order Malvales ====
===== Family Malvaceae (mallows) =====
English name	Scientific name	Status
Large-leaved lime	Tilia platyphyllos	
Small-leaved lime	Tilia cordata	
Musk-mallow	Malva moschata	
Greater musk-mallow	Malva alcea	*
Common mallow	Malva sylvestris	
French mallow	Malva nicaeensis	*
Least mallow	Malva parviflora	*
Small mallow	Malva pusilla	*
Dwarf mallow	Malva neglecta	
Chinese mallow	Malva verticillata	*
Tree-mallow	Lavatera arborea	
Smaller tree-mallow	Lavatera cretica	
Garden tree-mallow	Lavatera thuringiaca	*
Marsh-mallow	Althaea officinalis	
Rough marsh-mallow	Althaea hirsuta	*
Hollyhock	Alcea rosea	*
Greek mallow	Sidalcea malviflora	*
Velvetleaf	Abutilon theophrasti	*

===== Family Cistaceae (rock-rose family) =====
English name	Scientific name	Status
Spotted rock-rose	Tuberaria guttata	
Common rock-rose	Helianthemum nummularium	
White rock-rose	Helianthemum apenninum	
Hoary rock-rose	Helianthemum oelandicum	

==== Order Brassicales ====
===== Family Brassicaceae (mustards, crucifers, cabbage family) =====
English name	Scientific name	Status
Perennial rocket	Sisymbrium strictissimum	*
London-rocket	Sisymbrium irio	*
False London-rocket	Sisymbrium loeselii	*
Russian mustard	Sisymbrium volgense	*
Tall rocket	Sisymbrium altissimum	*
Eastern rocket	Sisymbrium orientale	*
Hedge mustard	Sisymbrium officinale	
Flixweed	Descurainia sophia	*
Garlic mustard	Alliaria petiolata	
Thale cress	Arabidopsis thaliana	
Woad	Isatis tinctoria	*
Warty-cabbage	Bunias orientalis	*
Treacle-mustard	Erysimum cheiranthoides	*
Wallflower	Erysimum cheiri	*
Dame's-violet	Hesperis matronalis	*
Virginia stock	Malcolmia maritima	*
Hoary stock	Matthiola incana	
Sea stock	Matthiola sinuata	
Winter-cress	Barbarea vulgaris	
Small-flowered winter-cress	Barbarea stricta	
Medium-flowered winter-cress	Barbarea intermedia	*
American winter-cress	Barbarea verna	*
Water-cress	Rorippa nasturtium-aquaticum	
Narrow-fruited water-cress	Rorippa microphylla	
Northern yellow-cress	Rorippa islandica	
Marsh yellow-cress	Rorippa palustris	
Creeping yellowcress	Rorippa sylvestris	
Great yellow-cress	Rorippa amphibia	
Austrian yellow-cress	Rorippa austriaca	*
Horseradish	Armoracia rusticana	*
Coralroot	Cardamine bulbifera	
Trefoil cress	Cardamine trifolia	*
Large bitter-cress	Cardamine amara	
Greater cuckooflower	Cardamine raphanifolia	*
Cuckooflower	Cardamine pratensis	
Narrow-leaved bitter-cress	Cardamine impatiens	
Wavy bitter-cress	Cardamine flexuosa	
Hairy bitter-cress	Cardamine hirsuta	
Northern rock-cress	Arabis petraea	
Tower mustard	Arabis glabra	
Tower cress	Arabis turrita	*
Alpine rock-cress	Arabis alpina	
Garden arabis	Arabis caucasica	*
Hairy rock-cress	Arabis hirsuta	
Rosy cress	Arabis collina	*
Bristol rock-cress	Arabis scabra	
Aubrieta	Aubrieta deltoidea	*
Annual honesty	Lunaria annua	*
Small alison	Alyssum alyssoides	*
Golden alison	Alyssum saxatile	*
Hoary alison	Berteroa incana	*
Sweet alison	Lobularia maritima	*
Yellow whitlowgrass	Draba aizoides	
Rock whitlowgrass	Draba norvegica	
Hoary whitlowgrass	Draba incana	
Wall whitlowgrass	Draba muralis	
Hairy whitlowgrass	Erophila majuscula	
Common whitlowgrass	Erophila verna	
Glabrous whitlowgrass	Erophila glabrescens	
English scurvygrass	Cochlearia anglica	
Pyrenean scurvygrass	Cochlearia pyrenaica	
Common scurvygrass	Cochlearia officinalis	
Mountain scurvygrass	Cochlearia micacea	
Danish scurvygrass	Cochlearia danica	
Gold-of-pleasure	Camelina sativa	*
Shepherd's-purse	Capsella bursa-pastoris	
Pink shepherd's-purse	Capsella rubella	*
Hutchinsia	Hornungia petraea	
Shepherd's cress	Teesdalia nudicaulis	
Field penny-cress	Thlaspi arvense	
Garlic penny-cress	Thlaspi alliaceum	*
Perfoliate penny-cress	Thlaspi perfoliatum	
Alpine penny-cress	Thlaspi caerulescens	
Caucasian penny-cress	Thlaspi macrophyllum	*
Perennial candytuft	Iberis sempervirens	*
Wild candytuft	Iberis amara	
Garden cress	Lepidium sativum	*
Field pepperwort	Lepidium campestre	
Smith's pepperwort	Lepidium heterophyllum	
Least pepperwort	Lepidium virginicum	*
Narrow-leaved pepperwort	Lepidium ruderale	
Dittander	Lepidium latifolium	
Tall pepperwort	Lepidium graminifolium	*
Hoary cress	Lepidium draba	*
Swine-cress	Lepidium coronopus	
Lesser swine-cress	Coronopus didymus	*
Awlwort	Subularia aquatica	
Perennial wall-rocket	Diplotaxis tenuifolia	
Annual wall-rocket	Diplotaxis muralis	*
Cabbage	Brassica oleracea	
Rapeseed	Brassica napus	*
Turnip	Brassica rapa	*
Chinese mustard	Brassica juncea	*
Black mustard	Brassica nigra	*
Charlock	Sinapis arvensis	
White mustard	Sinapis alba	*
Hairy rocket	Erucastrum gallicum	*
Isle of Man cabbage	Coincya monensis	
Lundy cabbage	Coincya wrightii	
Hoary mustard	Hirschfeldia incana	*
Sea rocket	Cakile maritima	
Bastard cabbage	Rapistrum rugosum	*
Steppe cabbage	Rapistrum perenne	*
Sea-kale	Crambe maritima	
Greater sea-kale	Crambe cordifolia	*
Wild radish	Raphanus raphanistrum	

===== Family Resedaceae =====
English name	Scientific name	Status
Weld	Reseda luteola	
White mignonette	Reseda alba	*
Wild mignonette	Reseda lutea	
Corn mignonette	Reseda phyteuma	*

==== Order Ericales ====
===== Family Ericaceae (heath, heather) =====
English name	Scientific name	Status
Crowberry	Empetrum nigrum	
Labrador-tea	Ledum palustre	*
Rhododendron	Rhododendron ponticum	*
Yellow azalea	Rhododendron luteum	*
Trailing azalea	Loiseleuria procumbens	
Bog-laurel	Kalmia polifolia	*
Sheep-laurel	Kalmia angustifolia	*
Blue heath	Phyllodoce caerulea	
St Dabeoc's heath	Daboecia cantabrica	
Bog-rosemary	Andromeda polifolia	
Shallon	Gaultheria shallon	*
Checkerberry	Gaultheria procumbens	*
Prickly heath	Gaultheria mucronata	*
Strawberry-tree	Arbutus unedo	
Bearberry	Arctostaphylos uva-ursi	
Arctic bearberry	Arctostaphylos alpinus	
Heather	Calluna vulgaris	
Dorset heath	Erica ciliaris	
Mackay's heath	Erica mackaiana	
Cross-leaved heath	Erica tetralix	
Corsican heath	Erica terminalis	*
Bell heather	Erica cinerea	
Portuguese heath	Erica lusitanica	*
Tree heath	Erica erigena	
Cornish heath	Erica vagans	
Cranberry	Vaccinium oxycoccos	
Small cranberry	Vaccinium microcarpum	
American cranberry	Vaccinium macrocarpon	*
Cowberry	Vaccinium vitis-idaea	
Bog bilberry	Vaccinium uliginosum	
Bilberry	Vaccinium myrtillus	
Blueberry	Vaccinium corymbosum	*
Common wintergreen	Pyrola minor	
Intermediate wintergreen	Pyrola media	
Round-leaved wintergreen	Pyrola rotundifolia	
Serrated wintergreen	Orthilia secunda	
One-flowered wintergreen	Moneses uniflora	
Yellow bird's-nest	Monotropa hypopitys	

===== Family Diapensiaceae (diapensia family) =====
English name	Scientific name	Status
Diapensia	Diapensia lapponica	

===== Family Primulaceae (primrose family) =====
English name	Scientific name	Status
Primrose	Primula vulgaris	
Oxlip	Primula elatior	
Cowslip	Primula veris	
Bird's-eye primrose	Primula farinosa	
Scottish primrose	Primula scotica	
Auricula	Primula auricula	*
Tibetan cowslip	Primula florindae	*
Sikkim cowslip	Primula sikkimensis	*
Japanese cowslip	Primula japonica	*
Water-violet	Hottonia palustris	
Sowbread	Cyclamen hederifolium	*
Eastern sowbread	Cyclamen coum	*
Yellow pimpernel	Lysimachia nemorum	
Creeping-jenny	Lysimachia nummularia	
Yellow loosestrife	Lysimachia vulgaris	
Fringed loosestrife	Lysimachia ciliata	*
Dotted loosestrife	Lysimachia punctata	*
Bog pimpernel	Lysimachia tenella (syn. Anagallis tenella)	
Lake loosestrife	Lysimachia terrestris	*
Tufted loosestrife	Lysimachia thyrsiflora	
Chickweed-wintergreen	Trientalis europaea	
Scarlet pimpernel	Anagallis arvensis	
Chaffweed	Anagallis minima	
Sea-milkwort	Glaux maritima	
Brookweed	Samolus valerandi	

===== Family Sarraceniaceae (carnivorous pitcher plants) =====
English name	Scientific name	Status
Purple pitcher plant	Sarracenia purpurea	*

==== Order Fabales ====
===== Family Fabaceae (legumes, peas, beans) =====
English name	Scientific name	Status
Australian blackwood	Acacia melanoxylon	*
False-acacia	Robinia pseudoacacia	*
Goat's-rue	Galega officinalis	*
Bladder-senna	Colutea arborescens	*
Chick-pea milk-vetch	Astragalus cicer	*
Purple milk-vetch	Astragalus danicus	
Alpine milk-vetch	Astragalus alpinus	
Wild liquorice	Astragalus glycyphyllos	
Lesser milk-vetch	Astragalus odoratus	*
Purple oxytropis	Oxytropis halleri	
Yellow oxytropis	Oxytropis campestris	
Sainfoin	Onobrychis viciifolia	
Kidney vetch	Anthyllis vulneraria	
Narrow-leaved bird's-foot trefoil	Lotus glaber	
Common bird's-foot trefoil	Lotus corniculatus	
Greater bird's-foot trefoil	Lotus pedunculatus	
Hairy bird's-foot trefoil	Lotus subbiflorus	
Slender bird's-foot trefoil	Lotus angustissimus	
Dragon's-teeth	Tetragonolobus maritimus	*
Yellow serradella	Ornithopus compressus	*
Serradella	Ornithopus sativus	*
Bird's-foot	Ornithopus perpusillus	
Orange bird's-foot	Ornithopus pinnatus	
Shrubby scorpion-vetch	Coronilla valentina	*
Annual scorpion-vetch	Coronilla scorpioides	*
Scorpion senna	Hippocrepis emerus	*
Horseshoe vetch	Hippocrepis comosa	
Crown vetch	Securigera varia	*
Wood bitter-vetch	Vicia orobus	
Tufted vetch	Vicia cracca	
Fine-leaved vetch	Vicia tenuifolia	*
Wood vetch	Vicia sylvatica	
Fodder vetch	Vicia villosa	*
Hairy tare	Vicia hirsuta	
Slender tare	Vicia parviflora	
Smooth tare	Vicia tetrasperma	
Bush vetch	Vicia sepium	
Hungarian vetch	Vicia pannonica	*
Common vetch	Vicia sativa	
Spring vetch	Vicia lathyroides	
Yellow-vetch	Vicia lutea	
Bithynian vetch	Vicia bithynica	
Black pea	Lathyrus niger	*
Sea pea	Lathyrus japonicus	
Bitter-vetch	Lathyrus linifolius	
Meadow vetchling	Lathyrus pratensis	
Marsh pea	Lathyrus palustris	
Tuberous pea	Lathyrus tuberosus	*
Two-flowered everlasting-pea	Lathyrus grandiflorus	*
Narrow-leaved everlasting-pea	Lathyrus sylvestris	
Broad-leaved everlasting-pea	Lathyrus latifolius	*
Norfolk everlasting-pea	Lathyrus heterophyllus	*
Hairy vetchling	Lathyrus hirsutus	*
Grass vetchling	Lathyrus nissolia	
Yellow vetchling	Lathyrus aphaca	
Yellow restharrow	Ononis natrix	*
Small restharrow	Ononis reclinata	
Spiny restharrow	Ononis spinosa	
Common restharrow	Ononis repens	
Tall melilot	Melilotus altissimus	*
White melilot	Melilotus albus	*
Ribbed melilot	Melilotus officinalis	*
Small melilot	Melilotus indicus	*
Black medick	Medicago lupulina	
Lucerne	Medicago sativa	
Bur medick	Medicago minima	
Toothed medick	Medicago polymorpha	
Spotted medick	Medicago arabica	
Bird's-foot clover	Trifolium ornithopodioides	
White clover	Trifolium repens	
Western clover	Trifolium occidentale	
Alsike clover	Trifolium hybridum	*
Clustered clover	Trifolium glomeratum	
Suffocated clover	Trifolium suffocatum	
Upright clover	Trifolium strictum	
Strawberry clover	Trifolium fragiferum	
Reversed clover	Trifolium resupinatum	*
Large trefoil	Trifolium aureum	*
Hop trefoil	Trifolium campestre	
Lesser trefoil	Trifolium dubium	
Slender trefoil	Trifolium micranthum	
Red clover	Trifolium pratense	
Zigzag clover	Trifolium medium	
Sulphur clover	Trifolium ochroleucon	
Hungarian clover	Trifolium pannonicum	*
Starry clover	Trifolium stellatum	*
Crimson clover	Trifolium incarnatum	
Knotted clover	Trifolium striatum	
Twin-headed clover	Trifolium bocconei	
Rough clover	Trifolium scabrum	
Hare's-foot clover	Trifolium arvense	
Sea clover	Trifolium squamosum	
Subterranean clover	Trifolium subterraneum	
False lupin	Thermopsis montana	*
Tree lupin	Lupinus arboreus	
Garden lupin	Lupinus polyphyllus	*
Nootka lupin	Lupinus nootkatensis	*
Laburnum	Laburnum anagyroides	*
Scottish laburnum	Laburnum alpinum	*
Black broom	Cytisus nigricans	*
White broom	Cytisus multiflorus	*
Hairy-fruited broom	Cytisus striatus	*
Broom	Cytisus scoparius	
Spanish broom	Spartium junceum	*
Montpellier broom	Genista monspessulana	*
Dyer's greenweed	Genista tinctoria	
Hairy greenweed	Genista pilosa	
Petty whin	Genista anglica	
Spanish gorse	Genista hispanica	*
Mount Etna broom	Genista aetnensis	*
Gorse	Ulex europaeus	
Western gorse	Ulex gallii	
Dwarf gorse	Ulex minor	

===== Family Polygalaceae (milkworts) =====
English name	Scientific name	Status
Common milkwort	Polygala vulgaris	
Heath milkwort	Polygala serpyllifolia	
Chalk milkwort	Polygala calcarea	
Dwarf milkwort	Polygala amarella	

==== Order Malvales ====
===== Family Thymelaeaceae (fibre bark family) =====
English name	Scientific name	Status
Mezereon	Daphne mezereum	
Spurge-laurel	Daphne laureola	

===== Family Myrtaceae (myrtle family) =====
English name	Scientific name	Status
Broom tea-tree	Leptospermum scoparium	*
Woolly tea-tree	Leptospermum lanigerum	*
White peppermint-gum	Eucalyptus pulchella	*
Chilean myrtle	Luma apiculata	*

===== Family Onagraceae (willowherb or evening primrose family) =====
English name	Scientific name	Status
Great willowherb	Epilobium hirsutum	
Hoary willowherb	Epilobium parviflorum	
Broad-leaved willowherb	Epilobium montanum	
Spear-leaved willowherb	Epilobium lanceolatum	
Square-stalked willowherb	Epilobium tetragonum	
Short-fruited willowherb	Epilobium obscurum	
Pale willowherb	Epilobium roseum	
American willowherb	Epilobium ciliatum	*
Marsh willowherb	Epilobium palustre	
Alpine willowherb	Epilobium anagallidifolium	
Chickweed willowherb	Epilobium alsinifolium	
New Zealand willowherb	Epilobium brunnescens	*
Rockery willowherb	Epilobium pedunculare	*
Bronzy willowherb	Epilobium komarovianum	*
Rosebay willowherb	Chamerion angustifolium	
Hampshire-purslane	Ludwigia palustris	
Large-flowered evening-primrose	Oenothera glazoviana	*
Common evening-primrose	Oenothera biennis	*
Small-flowered evening-primrose	Oenothera cambrica	
Fragrant evening-primrose	Oenothera stricta	*
Fuchsia	Fuchsia magellanica	*
Enchanter's-nightshade	Circaea lutetiana	
Alpine enchanter's-nightshade	Circaea alpina	

==== Order Cornales ====
===== Family Cornaceae (dogwood family) =====
English name	Scientific name	Status
Dogwood	Cornus sanguinea	
Red-osier dogwood	Cornus sericea	*
White dogwood	Cornus alba	*
Cornelian-cherry	Cornus mas	*
Dwarf cornel	Cornus suecica	
Spotted-laurel	Aucuba japonica	*
New Zealand broadleaf	Griselina littoralis	*

==== Order Celastrales ====
===== Family Celastraceae (staff vine or bittersweet family) =====
English name	Scientific name	Status
Spindle	Euonymus europaeus	
Large-leaved spindle	Euonymus latifolius	*
Evergreen spindle	Euonymus japonicus	*

==== Order Buxales ====
===== Family Buxaceae (boxwood family) =====
English name	Scientific name	Status
European box	Buxus sempervirens	

==== Order Rosales ====
===== Family Elaeagnaceae (oleaster family) =====
English name	Scientific name	Status
Sea-buckthorn	Hippophae rhamnoides	
Spreading oleaster	Elaeagnus umbellata	*

===== Family Rhamnaceae (buckthorn family) =====
English name	Scientific name	Status
Buckthorn	Rhamnus cathartica	
Mediterranean buckthorn	Rhamnus alaternus	*
Alder buckthorn	Rhamnus frangula	

==== Order Malpighiales ====
===== Family Euphorbiaceae (spurge family) =====
English name	Scientific name	Status
Dog's mercury	Mercurialis perennis	
Annual mercury	Mercurialis annua	*
Purple spurge	Euphorbia peplis	
Spotted spurge	Euphorbia maculata	*
Coral spurge	Euphorbia corallioides	*
Irish spurge	Euphorbia hyberna	
Sweet spurge	Euphorbia dulcis	*
Broad-leaved spurge	Euphorbia platyphyllos	
Upright spurge	Euphorbia serrulata	*
Sun spurge	Euphorbia helioscopia	
Caper spurge	Euphorbia lathyris	
Dwarf spurge	Euphorbia exigua	
Petty spurge	Euphorbia peplus	
Portland spurge	Euphorbia portlandica	
Sea spurge	Euphorbia paralias	
Leafy spurge	Euphorbia esula	*
Cypress spurge	Euphorbia cyparissias	
Wood spurge	Euphorbia amygdaloides	
Mediterranean spurge	Euphorbia characias	*

===== Family Linaceae (flax family) =====
English name	Scientific name	Status
Pale flax	Linum bienne	
Flax	Linum usitatissimum	*
Perennial flax	Linum perenne	
Fairy flax	Linum catharticum	
Allseed	Radiola linoides	

==== Order Cucurbitales ====
===== Family Cucurbitaceae (gourd family) =====
English name	Scientific name	Status
White bryony	Bryonia dioica	
Squirting cucumber	Ecballium elaterium	*

==== Order Celastrales ====
===== Family Celastraceae (staff vine or bittersweet family) =====
English name	Scientific name	Status
Grass-of-Parnassus	Parnassia palustris	

===== Family Berberidaceae (barberry family) =====
English name	Scientific name	Status
Barberry	Berberis vulgaris	
Thunberg's barberry	Berberis thunbergii	*
Great barberry	Berberis glaucocarpa	*
Mrs Wilson's barberry	Berberis wilsoniae	*
Clustered barberry	Berberis aggregata	*
Gagnepain's barberry	Berberis gagnepainii	*
Chinese barberry	Berberis julianae	*
Box-leaved barberry	Berberis buxifolia	*
Darwin's barberry	Berberis darwinii	*
Oregon-grape	Mahonia aquifolium	*

===== Family Papaveraceae (poppies) =====
English name	Scientific name	Status
Oriental poppy	Papaver pseudoorientale	*
Atlas poppy	Papaver atlanticum	*
Opium poppy	Papaver somniferum	*
Common poppy	Papaver rhoeas	
Long-headed poppy	Papaver dubium	
Rough poppy	Papaver hybridum	
Prickly poppy	Papaver argemone	
Welsh poppy	Papaver cambricum	
Mexican poppy	Argemone mexicana	*
Yellow horned-poppy	Glaucium flavum	
Greater celandine	Chelidonium majus	
Californian poppy	Eschscholzia californica	*
Bleeding-heart	Dicentra formosa	*
Bird-in-a-bush	Corydalis solida	*
Hollowroot	Corydalis cava	*
Fern-leaved corydalis	Corydalis cheilanthifolia	*
Yellow corydalis	Pseudofumaria lutea	*
Pale corydalis	Pseudofumaria alba	*
Climbing corydalis	Ceratocapnos claviculata	
White ramping-fumitory	Fumaria capreolata	
Western ramping-fumitory	Fumaria occidentalis	
Tall ramping-fumitory	Fumaria bastardii	
Martin's ramping-fumitory	Fumaria reuteri	
Common ramping-fumitory	Fumaria muralis	
Purple ramping-fumitory	Fumaria purpurea	
Common fumitory	Fumaria officinalis	
Dense-flowered fumitory	Fumaria densiflora	
Fine-leaved fumitory	Fumaria parviflora	
Few-flowered fumitory	Fumaria vaillantii	

==== Order Oxalidales ====
===== Family Oxalidaceae (wood sorrel family) =====
English name	Scientific name	Status
Chilean yellow-sorrel	Oxalis valdiviensis	*
Annual pink-sorrel	Oxalis rosea	*
Procumbent yellow-sorrel	Oxalis corniculata	*
Least yellow-sorrel	Oxalis exilis	*
Sussex yellow-sorrel	Oxalis dillenii	*
Upright yellow-sorrel	Oxalis stricta	*
Fleshy yellow-sorrel	Oxalis megalorrhiza	*
Pink-sorrel	Oxalis articulata	*
Wood-sorrel	Oxalis acetosella	
Large-flowered pink-sorrel	Oxalis debilis	*
Garden pink-sorrel	Oxalis latifolia	*
Four-leaved pink-sorrel	Oxalis tetraphylla	*
Bermuda-buttercup	Oxalis pes-caprae	*
Pale pink-sorrel	Oxalis incarnata	*

==== Order Geraniales ====
===== Family Geraniaceae (geranium family) =====
English name	Scientific name	Status
French crane's-bill	Geranium endressii	*
Pencilled crane's-bill	Geranium versicolor	*
Knotted crane's-bill	Geranium nodosum	*
Round-leaved crane's-bill	Geranium rotundifolium	
Wood crane's-bill	Geranium sylvaticum	
Armenian crane's-bill	Geranium psilostemon	*
Meadow crane's-bill	Geranium pratense	
Himalayan cranesbill	Geranium himalayense	*
Bloody crane's-bill	Geranium sanguineum	
Long-stalked crane's-bill	Geranium columbinum	
Cut-leaved crane's-bill	Geranium dissectum	
Alderney crane's-bill	Geranium submolle	*
Caucasian crane's-bill	Geranium ibericum	*
Hedgerow crane's-bill	Geranium pyrenaicum	
Small-flowered cranesbill	Geranium pusillum	
Dove's-foot crane's-bill	Geranium molle	
Rock cranesbill	Geranium macrorrhizum	*
Shining crane's-bill	Geranium lucidum	
Herb-Robert	Geranium robertianum	
Little robin	Geranium purpureum	
Greater herb-Robert	Geranium rubescens	*
Giant herb-Robert	Geranium maderense	*
Dusky crane's-bill	Geranium phaeum	*
Sea stork's-bill	Erodium maritimum	
Musk stork's-bill	Erodium moschatum	
Common stork's-bill	Erodium cicutarium	
Sticky stork's-bill	Erodium lebelii	
Peppermint-scented geranium	Pelargonium tomentosum	*

==== Order Brassicales ====
===== Family Tropaeolaceae (nasturtiums) =====
English name	Scientific name	Status
Flame nasturtium	Tropaeolum speciosum	*

==== Order Myrtales ====
===== Family Lythraceae (loosestrife family) =====
English name	Scientific name	Status
Purple-loosestrife	Lythrum salicaria	
Grass-poly	Lythrum hyssopifolia	
Water-purslane	Lythrum portula	

==== Order Crossosomatales ====
===== Family Staphyleaceae (bladdernut family) =====
English name	Scientific name	Status
Bladdernut	Staphylea pinnata	*

==== Order Sapindales ====
===== Family Sapindaceae (soapberry family) =====
English name	Scientific name	Status
Pride-of-India	Koelreuteria paniculata	*
Horse-chestnut	Aesculus hippocastanum	*
Red horse-chestnut	Aesculus carnea	*
Norway maple	Acer platanoides	*
Cappadocian maple	Acer cappadocicum	*
Field maple	Acer campestre	
Sycamore maple	Acer pseudoplatanus	*
Silver maple	Acer saccharinum	*
Ashleaf maple	Acer negundo	*

===== Family Anacardiaceae (cashew or sumach family) =====
English name	Scientific name	Status
Stag's-horn sumach	Rhus typhina	*

===== Family Simaroubaceae =====
English name	Scientific name	Status
Tree-of-heaven	Ailanthus altissima	*

==== Order Gentianales ====
===== Family Gentianaceae (gentian family) =====
English name	Scientific name	Status
Yellow centaury	Cicendia filiformis	
Guernsey centaury	Exaculum pusillum	
Perennial centaury	Centaurium scilloides	
Common centaury	Centaurium erythraea	
Seaside centaury	Centaurium littorale	
Lesser centaury	Centaurium pulchellum	
Slender centaury	Centaurium tenuiflorum	
Yellow-wort	Blackstonia perfoliata	
Fringed gentian	Gentianella ciliata	
Field gentian	Gentianella campestris	
Chiltern gentian	Gentianella germanica	
Autumn gentian	Gentianella amarella	
Early gentian	Gentianella anglica	
Dune gentian	Gentianella uliginosa	
Willow gentian	Gentiana asclepiadea	*
Marsh gentian	Gentiana pneumonanthe	
Trumpet gentian	Gentiana clusii	*
Spring gentian	Gentiana verna	
Alpine gentian	Gentiana nivalis	

===== Family Apocynaceae (dogbane family) =====
English name	Scientific name	Status
Lesser periwinkle	Vinca minor	*
Intermediate periwinkle	Vinca difformis	*
Greater periwinkle	Vinca major	*

===== Family Rubiaceae (coffee, madder or bedstraw family) =====
English name	Scientific name	Status
Tree bedstraw	Coprosma repens	*
Beadplant	Nertera granadensis	*
Field madder	Sherardia arvensis	
Caucasian crosswort	Phuopsis stylosa	*
Squinancywort	Asperula cynanchica	
Pink woodruff	Asperula taurina	*
Northern bedstraw	Galium boreale	
Woodruff	Galium odoratum	
Fen bedstraw	Galium uliginosum	
Slender marsh-bedstraw	Galium constrictum	
Common marsh-bedstraw	Galium palustre	
Lady's bedstraw	Galium verum	
Hedge bedstraw	Galium mollugo	
Slender bedstraw	Galium pumilum	
Limestone bedstraw	Galium sterneri	
Heath bedstraw	Galium saxatile	
Cleavers	Galium aparine	
False cleavers	Galium spurium	
Corn cleavers	Galium tricornutum	
Wall bedstraw	Galium parisiense	
Crosswort	Cruciata laevipes	
Wild madder	Rubia peregrina	

==== Order Solanales ====
===== Family Solanaceae (nightshade family) =====
English name	Scientific name	Status
Apple-of-Peru	Nicandra physalodes	*
Duke of Argyll's teaplant	Lycium barbarum	*
Chinese teaplant	Lycium chinense	*
Deadly nightshade	Atropa belladonna	
Henbane	Hyoscyamus niger	
Cock's-eggs	Salpichroa origanifolia	*
Japanese-lantern	Physalis alkekengi	*
Tomato	Lycopersicon esculentum	*
Black nightshade	Solanum nigrum	
Tall nightshade	Solanum chenopodioides	*
Green nightshade	Solanum physalifolium	*
Leafy-fruited nightshade	Solanum sarrachoides	*
Small nightshade	Solanum triflorum	*
Bittersweet	Solanum dulcamara	
Potato	Solanum tuberosum	*
Kangaroo-apple	Solanum laciniatum	*
Thorn-apple	Datura stramonium	*

===== Family Convolvulaceae (bindweed or morning glory family) =====
English name	Scientific name	Status
Kidneyweed	Dichondra micrantha	*
Field bindweed	Convolvulus arvensis	
Sea bindweed	Calystegia soldanella	
Hedge bindweed	Calystegia sepium	
Hairy bindweed	Calystegia pulchra	*
Large bindweed	Calystegia silvatica	*
Yellow dodder	Cuscuta campestris	*
Greater dodder	Cuscuta europaea	
Dodder	Cuscuta epithymum	

==== Order Boraginales ====
===== Family Boraginaceae (borage or forget-me-not family) =====
English name	Scientific name	Status
Phacelia	Phacelia tanacetifolia	*
Purple gromwell	Lithospermum purpurocaeruleum	
Common gromwell	Lithospermum officinale	
Field gromwell	Lithospermum arvense	
Viper's-bugloss	Echium vulgare	
Purple viper's-bugloss	Echium plantagineum	
Lax viper's-bugloss	Echium rosulatum	*
Giant viper's-bugloss	Echium pininana	*
Lungwort	Pulmonaria officinalis	*
Suffolk lungwort	Pulmonaria obscura	
Red lungwort	Pulmonaria rubra	*
Mawson's lungwort	Pulmonaria 'Mawson's Blue'	*
Narrow-leaved lungwort	Pulmonaria longifolia	
Common comfrey	Symphytum officinale	
Rough comfrey	Symphytum asperum	*
Tuberous comfrey	Symphytum tuberosum	
Creeping comfrey	Symphytum grandiflorum	*
Crimean comfrey	Symphytum tauricum	*
White comfrey	Symphytum orientale	*
Caucasian comfrey	Symphytum caucasicum	*
Bulbous comfrey	Symphytum bulbosum	*
Great forget-me-not	Brunnera macrophylla	*
Yellow alkanet	Anchusa ochroleuca	*
Alkanet	Anchusa officinalis	*
Garden anchusa	Anchusa azurea	*
Bugloss	Anchusa arvensis	
False alkanet	Cynoglottis barrelieri	*
Green alkanet	Pentaglottis sempervirens	*
Borage	Borago officinalis	*
Slender borage	Borago pygmaea	*
Abraham-Isaac-Jacob	Trachystemon orientalis	*
Oysterplant	Mertensia maritima	
Scarce fiddleneck	Amsinckia lycopsoides	*
Common fiddleneck	Amsinckia micrantha	*
White forget-me-not	Plagiobothrys scouleri	*
Madwort	Asperugo procumbens	*
Water forget-me-not	Myosotis scorpioides	
Creeping forget-me-not	Myosotis secunda	
Pale forget-me-not	Myosotis stolonifera	
Tufted forget-me-not	Myosotis laxa	
Jersey forget-me-not	Myosotis sicula	
Alpine forget-me-not	Myosotis alpestris	
Wood forget-me-not	Myosotis sylvatica	
Field forget-me-not	Myosotis arvensis	
Early forget-me-not	Myosotis ramosissima	
Changing forget-me-not	Myosotis discolor	
Blue-eyed-Mary	Omphalodes verna	*
Hound's-tongue	Cynoglossum officinale	
Green hound's-tongue	Cynoglossum germanicum	

==== Order Lamiales ====
===== Family Verbenaceae (vervain family) =====
English name	Scientific name	Status
Vervain	Verbena officinalis	
Betony	Stachys officinalis	
Lamb's-ear	Stachys byzantina	*
Downy woundwort	Stachys germanica	
Limestone woundwort	Stachys alpina	
Hedge woundwort	Stachys sylvatica	
Marsh woundwort	Stachys palustris	
Perennial yellow-woundwort	Stachys recta	*
Field woundwort	Stachys arvensis	

===== Family Lamiaceae (mint or deadnettle family) =====
English name	Scientific name	Status
Black horehound	Ballota nigra	
Motherwort	Leonurus cardiaca	*
Yellow archangel	Lamiastrum galeobdolon	
White dead-nettle	Lamium album	
Spotted deadnettle	Lamium maculatum	*
Red dead-nettle	Lamium purpureum	
Cut-leaved dead-nettle	Lamium hybridum	
Northern dead-nettle	Lamium confertum	
Henbit dead-nettle	Lamium amplexicaule	
Downy hemp-nettle	Galeopsis segetum	
Red hemp-nettle	Galeopsis angustifolia	
Large-flowered hemp-nettle	Galeopsis speciosa	
Common hemp-nettle	Galeopsis tetrahit	
Bifid hemp-nettle	Galeopsis bifida	
Turkish sage	Phlomis russeliana	*
Jerusalem sage	Phlomis fruticosa	*
Bastard balm	Melittis melissophyllum	
White horehound	Marrubium vulgare	
Somerset skullcap	Scutellaria altissima	*
Skullcap	Scutellaria galericulata	
Norfolk skullcap	Scutellaria hastifolia	*
Lesser skullcap	Scutellaria minor	
Wood sage	Teucrium scorodonia	
Wall germander	Teucrium chamaedrys	
Water germander	Teucrium scordium	
Cut-leaved germander	Teucrium botrys	
Bugle	Ajuga reptans	
Pyramidal bugle	Ajuga pyramidalis	
Ground-pine	Ajuga chamaepitys	
Catmint	Nepeta cataria	
Ground-ivy	Glechoma hederacea	
Selfheal	Prunella vulgaris	
Cut-leaved selfheal	Prunella laciniata	*
Balm	Melissa officinalis	*
Winter savory	Satureja montana	*
Wood calamint	Clinopodium menthifolium	
Common calamint	Clinopodium ascendens	
Lesser calamint	Clinopodium calamintha	
Wild basil	Clinopodium vulgare	
Basil thyme	Clinopodium acinos	
Hyssop	Hyssopus officinalis	*
Wild marjoram	Origanum vulgare	
Garden thyme	Thymus vulgaris	*
Large thyme	Thymus pulegioides	
Wild thyme	Thymus polytrichus	
Breckland thyme	Thymus serpyllum	
Gypsywort	Lycopus europaeus	
Corn mint	Mentha arvensis	
Water mint	Mentha aquatica	
Spear mint	Mentha spicata	*
Round-leaved mint	Mentha suaveolens	
Pennyroyal	Mentha pulegium	
Corsican mint	Mentha requienii	*
Rosemary	Rosmarinus officinalis	*
Clary	Salvia sclarea	*
Sticky clary	Salvia glutinosa	*
Meadow clary	Salvia pratensis	
Wild clary	Salvia verbenaca	
Annual clary	Salvia viridis	*
Whorled clary	Salvia verticillata	*

===== Family Plantaginaceae (plantain family) =====
English name	Scientific name	Status
Mare's-tail	Hippuris vulgaris	
Autumnal water-starwort	Callitriche hermaphroditica	
Short-leaved water-starwort	Callitriche truncata	
Common water-starwort	Callitriche stagnalis	
Various-leaved water-starwort	Callitriche platycarpa	
Blunt-fruited water-starwort	Callitriche obtusangula	
Pedunculate water-starwort	Callitriche brutia	
Intermediate water-starwort	Callitriche hamulata	
Buck's-horn plantain	Plantago coronopus	
Sea plantain	Plantago maritima	
Greater plantain	Plantago major	
Hoary plantain	Plantago media	
Ribwort plantain	Plantago lanceolata	
Branched plantain	Plantago arenaria	*
Shoreweed	Littorella uniflora	
Snapdragon	Antirrhinum majus	*
Malling toadflax	Chaenorhinum origanifolium	*
Small toadflax	Chaenorhinum minus	
Weasel's-snout	Misopates orontium	
Pale weasel's-snout	Asarina procumbens	*
Ivy-leaved toadflax	Cymbalaria muralis	*
Italian toadflax	Cymbalaria pallida	*
Corsican toadflax	Cymbalaria hepaticifolia	*
Sharp-leaved fluellen	Kickxia elatine	
Round-leaved fluellen	Kickxia spuria	
Common toadflax	Linaria vulgaris	
Balkan toadflax	Linaria dalmatica	*
Purple toadflax	Linaria purpurea	*
Pale toadflax	Linaria repens	
Prostrate toadflax	Linaria supina	*
Sand toadflax	Linaria arenaria	*
Jersey toadflax	Linaria pelisseriana	e
Foxglove	Digitalis purpurea	
Straw foxglove	Digitalis lutea	*
Fairy foxglove	Erinus alpinus	*
Thyme-leaved speedwell	Veronica serpyllifolia	
Corsican speedwell	Veronica repens	*
Alpine speedwell	Veronica alpina	
Rock speedwell	Veronica fruticans	
Large speedwell	Veronica austriaca	*
Heath speedwell	Veronica officinalis	
Germander speedwell	Veronica chamaedrys	
Wood speedwell	Veronica montana	
Marsh speedwell	Veronica scutellata	
Brooklime	Veronica beccabunga	
Blue water-speedwell	Veronica anagallis-aquatica	
Pink water-speedwell	Veronica catenata	
French speedwell	Veronica acinifolia	*
Breckland speedwell	Veronica praecox	*
Fingered speedwell	Veronica triphyllos	
Wall speedwell	Veronica arvensis	
Spring speedwell	Veronica verna	
American speedwell	Veronica peregrina	*
Green field-speedwell	Veronica agrestis	
Grey field-speedwell	Veronica polita	
Common field-speedwell	Veronica persica	*
Crested field-speedwell	Veronica crista-galli	*
Slender speedwell	Veronica filiformis	*
Ivy-leaved speedwell	Veronica hederifolia	
Garden speedwell	Veronica longifolia	*
Spiked speedwell	Veronica spicata	
Koromiko	Veronica salicifolia	*
Hooker's hebe	Hebe brachysiphon	*
Dieffenbach's hebe	Hebe dieffenbachii	*
Barker's hebe	Veronica barkeri (syn. Hebe barkeri)	*
Cornish moneywort	Sibthorpia europaea	

===== Family Scrophulariaceae (figwort family) =====
English name	Scientific name	Status
Alternate-leaved butterfly-bush	Buddleja alternifolia	*
Butterfly-bush	Buddleja davidii	*
Orange-ball-tree	Buddleja globosa	*
Moth mullein	Verbascum blattaria	*
Twiggy mullein	Verbascum virgatum	
Caucasian mullein	Verbascum pyramidatum	*
Broussa mullein	Verbascum bombyciferum	*
Orange mullein	Verbascum phlomoides	*
Dense-flowered mullein	Verbascum densiflorum	*
Great mullein	Verbascum thapsus	
Nettle-leaved mullein	Verbascum chaixii	*
Dark mullein	Verbascum nigrum	
Hungarian mullein	Verbascum speciosum	*
Hoary mullein	Verbascum pulverulentum	
White mullein	Verbascum lychnitis	
Common figwort	Scrophularia nodosa	
Water figwort	Scrophularia auriculata	
Green figwort	Scrophularia umbrosa	
Balm-leaved figwort	Scrophularia scorodonia	
Yellow figwort	Scrophularia vernalis	*
Cape figwort	Phygelius capensis	*
Mudwort	Limosella aquatica	
Welsh mudwort	Limosella australis	

===== Family Oleaceae (olive family) =====
English name	Scientific name	Status
Ash	Fraxinus excelsior	
Lilac	Syringa vulgaris	*
Wild privet	Ligustrum vulgare	
Garden privet	Ligustrum ovalifolium	*

===== Family Phrymaceae (lopseed family) =====
English name	Scientific name	Status
Musk	Erythranthe moschatus	*
Monkeyflower	Erythranthe guttatus	*
Blood-drop-emlets	Erythranthe luteus	*

===== Family Calceolariaceae =====
English name	Scientific name	Status
Slipperwort	Calceolaria chelidonoides	*

===== Family Orobanchaceae (broomrapes) =====
English name	Scientific name	Status
Crested cow-wheat	Melampyrum cristatum	
Field cow-wheat	Melampyrum arvense	
Common cow-wheat	Melampyrum pratense	
Small cow-wheat	Melampyrum sylvaticum	
An eyebright	Euphrasia rostkoviana	
An eyebright	Euphrasia rivularis	
An eyebright	Euphrasia anglica	
An eyebright	Euphrasia vigursii	
An eyebright	Euphrasia arctica	
An eyebright	Euphrasia tetraquetra	
An eyebright	Euphrasia nemorosa	
An eyebright	Euphrasia pseudokerneri	
An eyebright	Euphrasia confusa	
An eyebright	Euphrasia stricta	*
An eyebright	Euphrasia frigida	
An eyebright	Euphrasia foulaensis	
An eyebright	Euphrasia cambrica	
An eyebright	Euphrasia ostenfeldii	
An eyebright	Euphrasia marshallii	
An eyebright	Euphrasia rotundifolia	
An eyebright	Euphrasia campbelliae	
An eyebright	Euphrasia micrantha	
An eyebright	Euphrasia scottica	
An eyebright	Euphrasia heslop-harrisonii	
An eyebright	Euphrasia salisburgensis	
French bartsia	Odontites jaubertianus	*
Red bartsia	Odontites vernus	
Alpine bartsia	Bartsia alpina	
Yellow bartsia	Parentucellia viscosa	
Greater yellow-rattle	Rhinanthus angustifolius	
Yellow-rattle	Rhinanthus minor	
Marsh lousewort	Pedicularis palustris	
Lousewort	Pedicularis sylvatica	
Toothwort	Lathraea squamaria	
Purple toothwort	Lathraea clandestina	*
Yarrow broomrape	Orobanche purpurea	
Greater broomrape	Orobanche rapum-genistae	
Bedstraw broomrape	Orobanche caryophyllacea	
Knapweed broomrape	Orobanche elatior	
Thyme broomrape	Orobanche alba	
Thistle broomrape	Orobanche reticulata	
Bean broomrape	Orobanche crenata	*
Ivy broomrape	Orobanche hederae	
Oxtongue broomrape	Orobanche artemisiae-campestris	
Common broomrape	Orobanche minor	

===== Family Gesneriaceae (African violet family) =====
English name	Scientific name	Status
Pyrenean-violet	Ramonda myconi	*

===== Family Acanthaceae (acanthus family) =====
English name	Scientific name	Status
Bear's-breech	Acanthus mollis	*
Spiny bear's-breech	Acanthus spinosus	*

===== Family Lentibulariaceae (bladderwort family) =====
English name	Scientific name	Status
Pale butterwort	Pinguicula lusitanica	
Alpine butterwort	Pinguicula alpina	e
Common butterwort	Pinguicula vulgaris	
Large-flowered butterwort	Pinguicula grandiflora	
Greater bladderwort	Utricularia vulgaris	
Bladderwort	Utricularia australis	
Intermediate bladderwort	Utricularia intermedia	
Nordic bladderwort	Utricularia stygia	
Pale bladderwort	Utricularia ochroleuca	
Lesser bladderwort	Utricularia minor	

===== Family Campanulaceae (bellflower family) =====
English name	Scientific name	Status
Spreading bellflower	Campanula patula	
Rampion bellflower	Campanula rapunculus	*
Milky bellflower	Campanula lactiflora	*
Peach-leaved bellflower	Campanula persicifolia	*
Canterbury-bells	Campanula medium	*
Cornish bellflower	Campanula alliarifolia	*
Clustered bellflower	Campanula glomerata	
Chimney bellflower	Campanula pyramidalis	*
Adria bellflower	Campanula portenschlagiana	*
Trailing bellflower	Campanula poscharskyana	*
Giant bellflower	Campanula latifolia	
Nettle-leaved bellflower	Campanula trachelium	
Creeping bellflower	Campanula rapunculoides	*
Broad-leaved harebell	Campanula rhomboidalis	*
Harebell	Campanula rotundifolia	
Venus's-looking-glass	Legousia hybrida	
Ivy-leaved bellflower	Hesperocodon hederacea	
Throatwort	Trachelium caeruleum	*
Spiked rampion	Phyteuma spicatum	
Round-headed rampion	Phyteuma orbiculare	
Oxford rampion	Phyteuma scheuchzeri	*
Sheep's-bit	Jasione montana	
Heath lobelia	Lobelia urens	
Garden lobelia	Lobelia erinus	*
Water lobelia	Lobelia dortmanna	
Lawn lobelia	Pratia angulata	*
Californian lobelia	Downingia elegans	*

== Notes ==
1. Recurved sandwort (Minuartia recurva) is found only in Ireland.
2. Corn spurrey (Spergula arvensis) is an archaeophyte in Britain and Ireland; a native population exists on the Channel Islands
