= Symphytum peregrinum =

Symphytum peregrinum may refer to the following comfrey species:

- Symphytum peregrinum auct.: Symphytum × uplandicum, the Russian or Quaker comfrey
- Symphytum peregrinum Ledeb.: Symphytum officinale subsp. officinale
