= Caucasicum =

caucasicum is a species name, "of the Caucasus." Some genera associated with this name are:

== Flora ==
- Erythronium caucasicum, a bulbous perennial
- Rhododendron caucasicum, an alpine variety of rhododendron
- Sempervivum caucasicum, a succulent plant
- Symphytum caucasicum, an ornamental plant
- Trifolium caucasicum, a clover
- Tripleurospermum caucasicum, an aster

== Fauna ==
=== Insects, arthropods ===
- Chrysotoxum caucasicum, a hoverfly
- Rhagium caucasicum, a beetle
- Sceliphron caucasicum, a wasp
- Xestobium caucasicum, a beetle
- Zodarion caucasicum, an ant-eating spider

=== Mammals ===
- Elasmotherium caucasicum, an extinct giant rhinoceros
