= Ethmia maracandica =

Scientific classification
- Domain: Eukaryota
- Kingdom: Animalia
- Phylum: Arthropoda
- Class: Insecta
- Order: Lepidoptera
- Family: Depressariidae
- Genus: Ethmia
- Species: E. maracandica

Binomial name
- Ethmia maracandica (Rebel, 1901)

Synonyms
- Psecadia maracandica Rebel, 1901

Species of moth

Ethmia maracandica is a moth in the family Depressariidae. It was described by Rebel in 1901. It is found in Uzbekistan and Russia.

The wingspan is 23–25 mm (0.91–0.98 in). Adults are similar to Ethmia lugubris.
