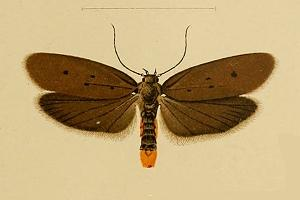

Scientific classification
- Domain: Eukaryota
- Kingdom: Animalia
- Phylum: Arthropoda
- Class: Insecta
- Order: Lepidoptera
- Family: Depressariidae
- Genus: Ethmia
- Species: E. lugubris

Binomial name
- Ethmia lugubris (Staudinger, 1879)

Synonyms
- Psecadia lugubris Staudinger, 1879

= Ethmia lugubris =

Species of moth

Ethmia lugubris is a moth in the family Depressariidae. It is found in Austria, Bulgaria, Romania and Russia.

The larvae have been recorded feeding on Symphytum officinale.

== Subspecies ==
- Ethmia lugubris lugubris (Austria, Bulgaria, Romania, Russia)
- Ethmia lugubris multidentata Capuse & Szabo, 1983 (Romania)
