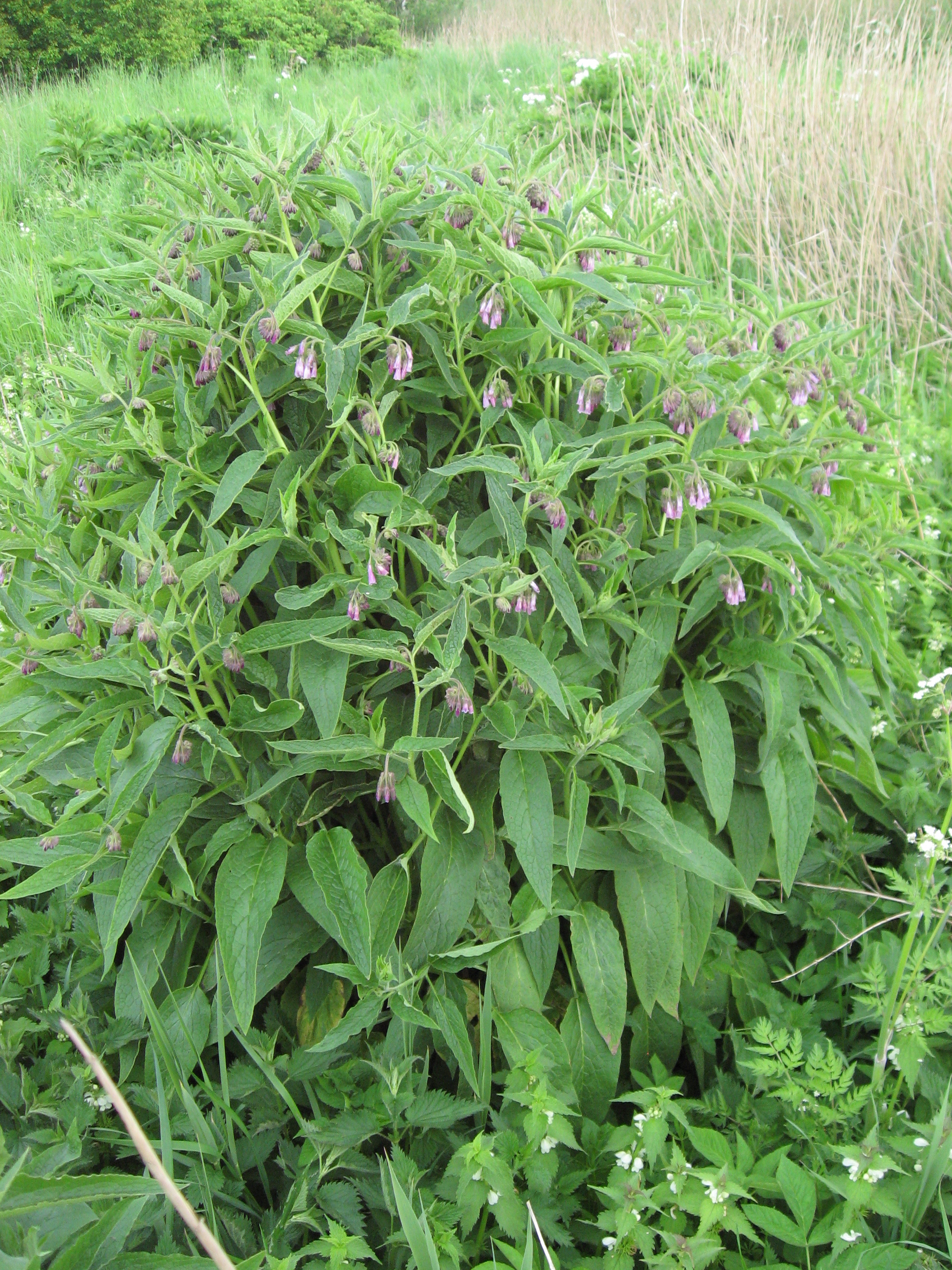

Scientific classification
- Kingdom: Plantae
- Clade: Tracheophytes
- Clade: Angiosperms
- Clade: Eudicots
- Clade: Asterids
- Order: Boraginales
- Family: Boraginaceae
- Genus: Symphytum
- Species: S. × uplandicum

Binomial name
- Symphytum × uplandicum Nyman

= Symphytum × uplandicum =

Hybrid species of plant

Russian comfrey or Quaker comfrey (Symphytum × uplandicum, syn. S. peregrinum auct.) is a common hybrid between Symphytum officinale and S. asperum. It represents the economically most important kind of comfrey.

It occurs naturally in the Caucasus region where it grows in waste areas and disturbed soils. It has been introduced as a crop in many places around the world, and is widespread in the British Isles and interbreeds with S. officinale.

== Description ==
It grows as a perennial herb. It grows to heights of up to 2 meters (6'). Above ground the plant is hairy, but not spiny. Its root system has a pronounced, deep-reaching taproot. Along the erect, branched stems grow large simple, mostly stalked leaves. On the lower stem they are arranged in an alternate pattern. In the upper parts they may be opposite and are stalkless, shortly decurrent, or more or less fused around the stem. The leaf blade is up to 25 centimeters (9.8 in) long and never cordate. There are no stipules.

The flowering period is from May to August. The inflorescences are forked cymes. It does not have bracts. The hermaphrodite flowers are radially symmetrical with five-petals and dichlamydeous perianth. The five sepals are fused into a 5 to 7 millimetres (around ¼") long calyx with usually pointed calyx lobes. The five petals are either initially pink and later blue or permanently purple. The corolla measures 12 to 18 millimetres (¼" to ¾") in diameter. The filaments of the five stamens are narrower than their anthers. The fruits are segmented into four egg-shaped nutlets whose surfaces are brown, dull, and finely granular. They measure 3 to 4 by 2 to 2.5 millimeters. The chromosome count is 2n = 36.

== Similar species ==
Symphytum officinale has decurrent leaf bases, winged stem internodes, and seeds with shiny black surfaces.

== Taxonomy ==
Symphytum uplandicum is an interspecific hybrid between Symphytum asperum and Symphytum officinale. It is itself parent to the multiple-cross hybrids Symphytum × hidcotense P. D. Sell: (together with Symphytum grandiflorum DC.) and Symphytum × perringianum P. H. Oswald & P. D. Sell (together with Symphytum orientale L.). The epithet uplandicum refers to the Swedish province of Uppland, where the observation for the official first formal scientific species description was made by Carl Frederik Nyman and published in 1855 in Sylloge Florae Europaeae. Symphytum peregrinum auct. non Lepech. is regarded as a synonymous. Several forms have been described, initially as independent hybrids.

== Uses ==
Its hybrid vigour (→yield potential) makes Russian comfrey the preferred Symphytum crop. After two years of establishment, the robust and easy perennial crop enables highest protein yields. In addition to medicinal, horticultural and ornamental use, it is also known as animal food and even for human consumption. However, concerns about possible liver damage due to prolonged uptake of the pyrrolizidine alkaloids contained in the plant have been a cause for restraint in its use for some time, especially in food use (the "comfrey crisis"). Since around the year 2000, there are even international bans on products containing comfrey. Since 2008, an alkaloid-free variety has been known.

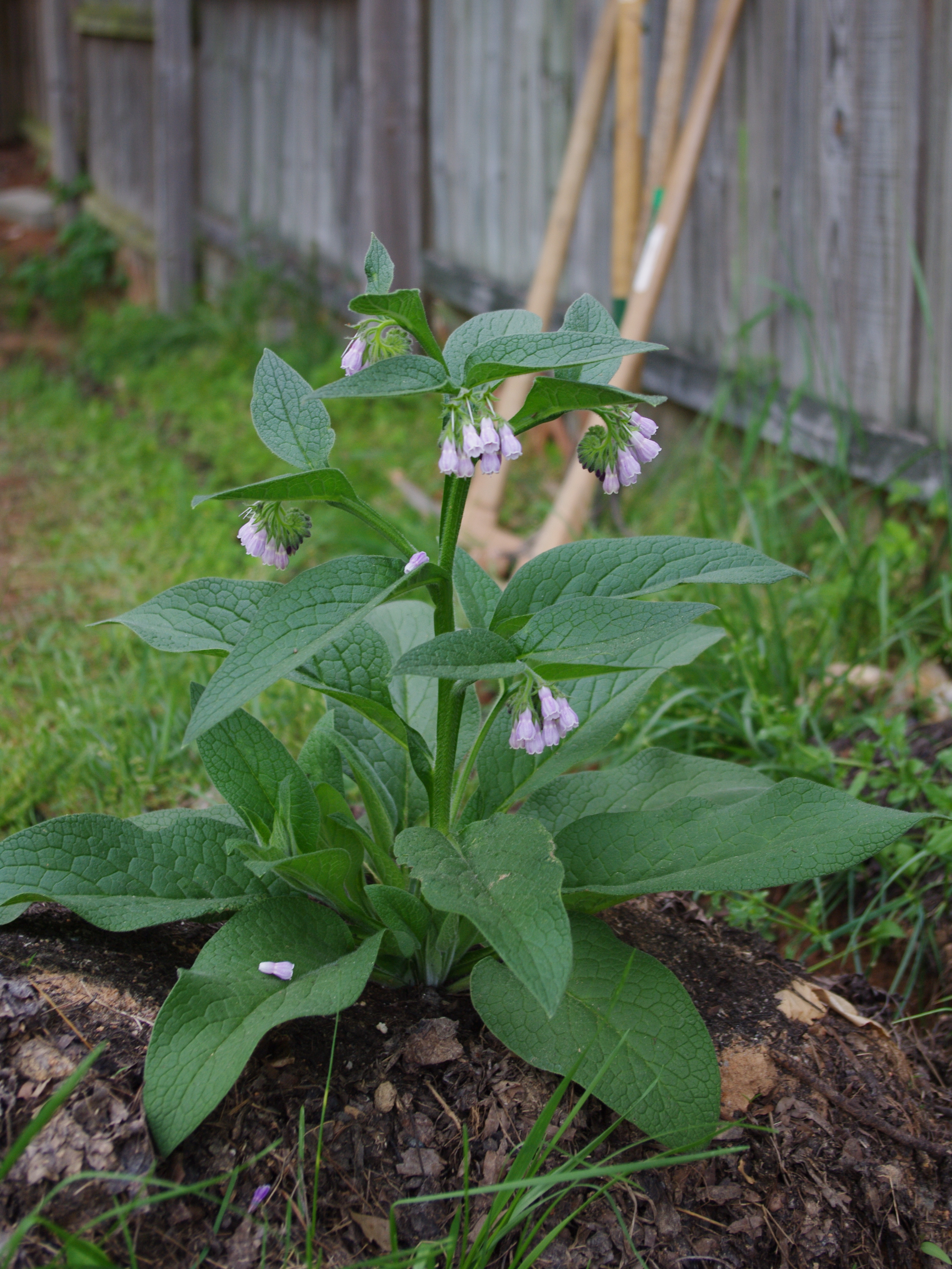
Popular cultivar "Bocking #14"

Notable cultivated varieties are "Bocking No. 4" and "Bocking No. 14" from the English Henry Doubleday Research Association (HDRA), as well as "Harras" as the first alkaloid-free cultivar. Bocking No. 14 is an early-season variety that high in allantoin and potassium and resistant to comfrey rust. Lower in allantoin and higher in protein, Bocking No. 4 is recommended for human consumption and for feeding poultry.

The plant is also a good nectar source.

Several ornamental varieties exist, e.g. with variegated leaves or different flower colours.

=== Medicinal uses ===
The plant parts of Russian comfrey are used for medicinal purposes (mainly because of the allantoin content). They are made into a salve that accelerates wound healing and relieves muscle and joint pain, among other things.

=== Garden uses ===
The plants are soil-tolerant heavy feeders with high biomass production. The protein- and therefore nitrogen-rich leaves are valued as a high-quality fertiliser. They are used, for example, for making a fermented liquid fertiliser or as mulch. As the plant can accept rather aggressive raw manure in larger amounts, it can be used to convert it into a more amenable fertiliser. The deep root system loosens the soil and accesses nutrients from greater depths, transporting them to higher soil layers via decaying plant matter.

=== Cultivation history ===
Catherine II traditionally employed garden masters from England or Scotland at her palace in St. Petersburg. In this capacity, Joseph Busch had, since the late 18th century, planted beds of prickly and common comfrey, flowering side by side for an interesting contrast of colour, and had already sent various comfrey plants to his business successor back in London. Having experimented with prickly comfrey for agricultural use since 1810, gardener and inventor Henry Doubleday heard of comfrey's sticky properties when he was searching for a substitute for the unreliable supply of gum arabic, hoping to be able to develop a new adhesive for postage stamps. In the early 1870s he used this connection to order comfrey plants from Busch's successor. The imperial gardener did not touch his predecessor's well-established plantings, but instead he sent chance seedlings that had grown between the rows: F1 hybrids of prickly and common comfrey. From 1877, Thomas Christy's book Forage Crops made this "Russian" comfrey known as a crop.

== Sources ==
- Lawrence D. Hills (2011-10-20). Comfrey: Past, Present and Future. Faber & Faber. ISBN 978-0-571-28091-9.
- Bogumil Pawłowski: Symphytum. In: Flora Europaea. 2010. pp. 103–104. ISBN 978-0-521-15368-3.
