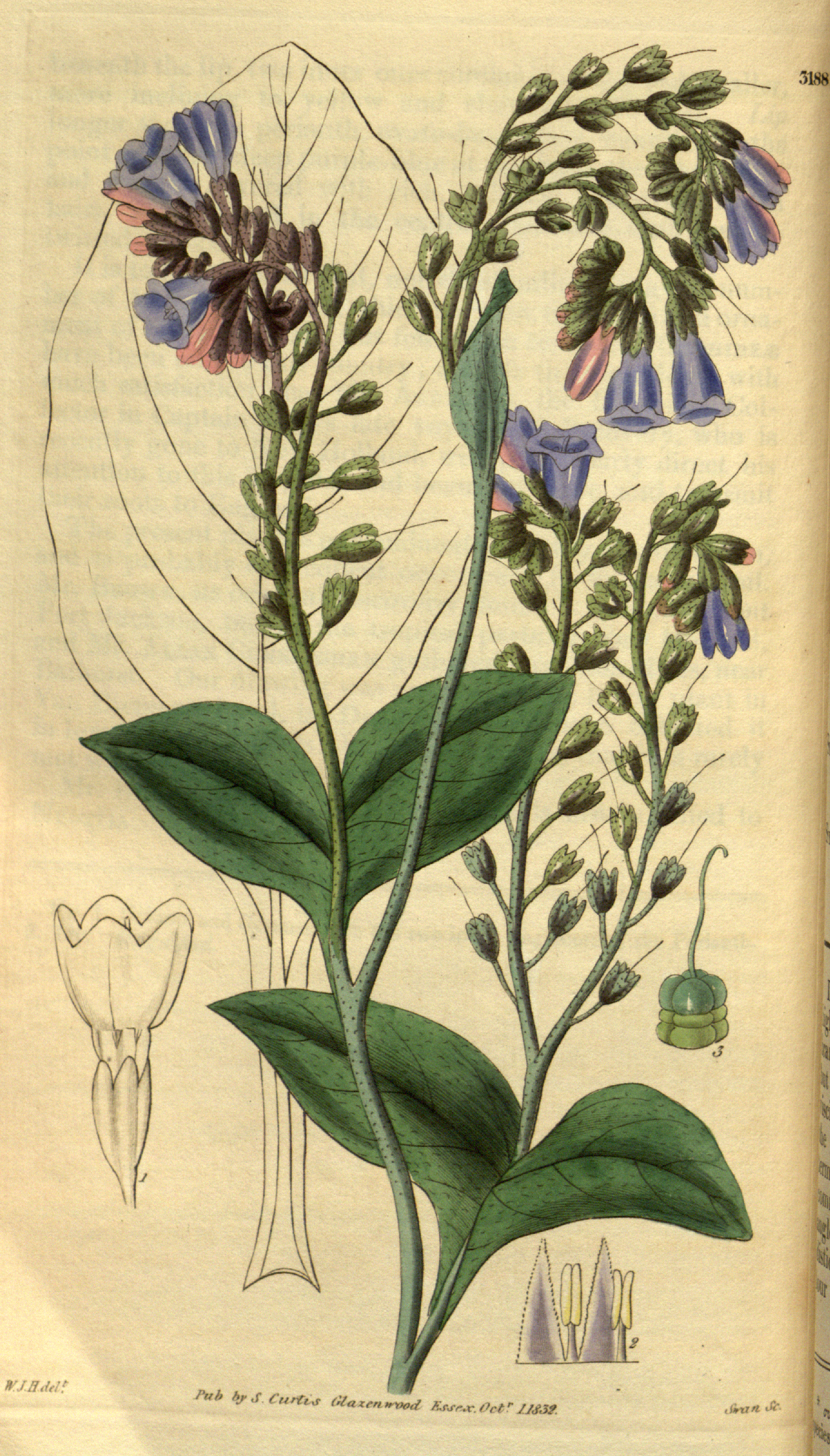
- Symphytum caucasicum

Scientific classification
- Kingdom: Plantae
- Clade: Embryophytes
- Clade: Tracheophytes
- Clade: Angiosperms
- Clade: Eudicots
- Clade: Asterids
- Order: Boraginales
- Family: Boraginaceae
- Subfamily: Boraginoideae
- Genus: Symphytum; Tourn. ex L. (1753)

Type species
- Symphytum officinale L.

Species
- 27; see text

Synonyms
- Consolida Riv. ex Ruppius (1745), not validly publ.; Procopiania Guşul. (1928); × Procopiphytum Pawł. (1971)

= Symphytum =

Genus of flowering plants in the borage family

Symphytum is a genus of flowering plants in the borage family, Boraginaceae, known by the common name comfrey (pronounced /ˈkʌmfri/, from the Latin confervere to 'heal' or literally to 'boil together', referring to uses in ancient traditional medicine).

Symphytum is native to northern temperate regions of Europe and Asia, with a wide introduced distribution on both continents as well as the Americas. There are 59 recognized species. More than 150 species have been cataloged by botanists. Some species and hybrids, particularly S. officinale, Symphytum grandiflorum, and S. × uplandicum, are used in gardening and herbal medicine. Species in the genus Symphytum are different from Andersonglossum virginianum, known as wild comfrey, which is another member of the borage family.

== Species ==
27 species are accepted.

- Symphytum aintabicum Hub.-Mor. & Wickens
- Symphytum anatolicum Boiss.
- Symphytum asperum Lepech. – prickly comfrey, rough comfrey
- Symphytum × bicknellii Buckn.
- Symphytum bornmuelleri Buckn.
- Symphytum brachycalyx Boiss. – Palestine comfrey
- Symphytum bulbosum – bulbous comfrey
- Symphytum carpaticum Yu.M.Frolov
- Symphytum caucasicum – Caucasian comfrey
- Symphytum circinale Runemark
- Symphytum cordatum Waldst. & Kit. ex Willd.
- Symphytum creticum (Willd.) Runemark
- Symphytum davisii Wickens
- Symphytum × ferrariense C.Massal.
- Symphytum grandiflorum DC. – creeping comfrey
- Symphytum gussonei F.W.Schultz
- Symphytum hajastanum Gvin.
- Symphytum ibiricum Steven – Iberian comfrey
- Symphytum kurdicum Boiss. & Hausskn.
- Symphytum longisetum Hub.-Mor. & Wickens
- Symphytum × mosquense S.R.Majorov & D.D.Sokoloff
- Symphytum officinale L. – comfrey
- Symphytum orientale L. – white comfrey
- Symphytum ottomanum Friv.
- Symphytum podcumicum Yu.M.Frolov
- Symphytum pseudobulbosum Azn.
- Symphytum savvalense Kurtto
- Symphytum sylvaticum Boiss.
- Symphytum tauricum Willd. – Crimean comfrey
- Symphytum tuberosum L. – tuberous comfrey
- Symphytum × ullepitschii Wettst.
- Symphytum × uplandicum Nyman (S. asperum × S. officinale, synonym: S. peregrinum) – Russian comfrey, healing herb, blackwort, bruisewort, wallwort, gum plant

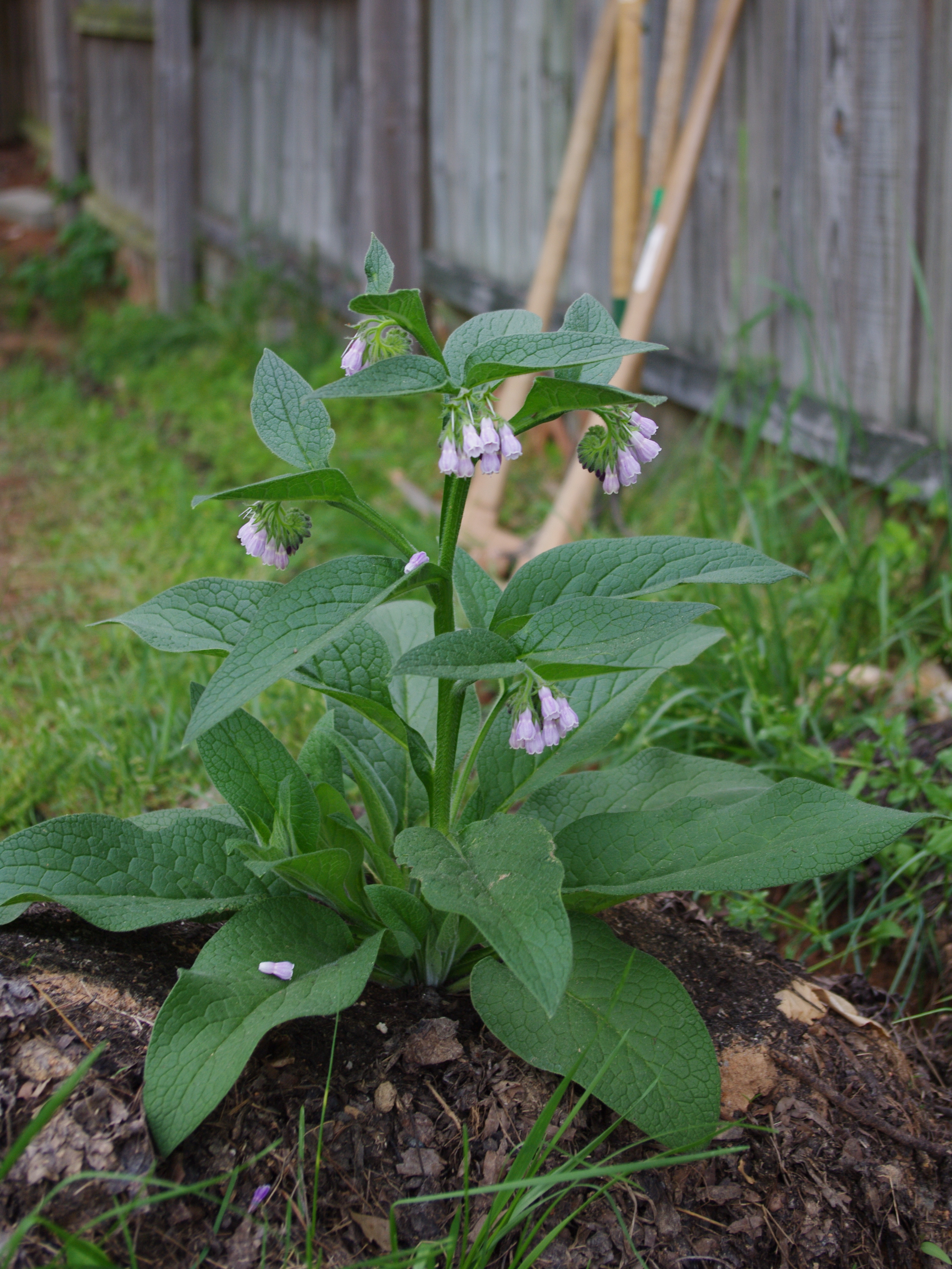
Russian comfrey (Symphytum × uplandicum)

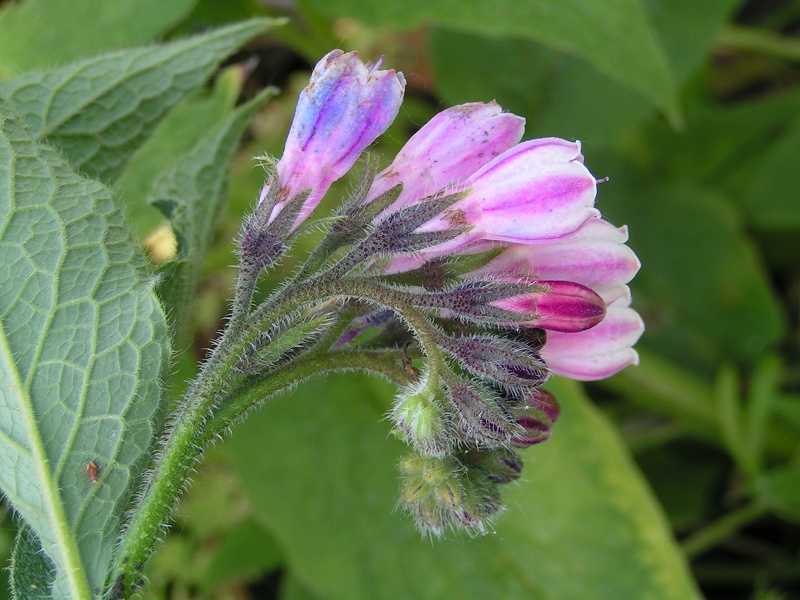
Flowers of Russian comfrey

- Symphytum × wettsteinii Sennholz

== Cultivation ==
Comfrey is usually cultivated from rootstock. The Russian comfrey 'Bocking 4' and 'Bocking 14' cultivars were developed during the 1950s by Lawrence D. Hills, the founder of the Henry Doubleday Research Association (the organic gardening organization itself named after Henry Doubleday, who first introduced Russian comfrey into Britain in the nineteenth century) following trials at Bocking, Essex.

=== Propagation ===
Bocking 4 and 14 are sterile, and therefore will not set seed (one of its advantages over other cultivars as it will not spread out of control); thus, it is propagated from root cuttings. The gardener can produce "offsets" from mature, strongly growing plants by driving a spade horizontally through the leaf clumps about 7 cm (2.8 in) below the soil surface. This removes the crown, which can then be split into pieces. The original plant will quickly recover, and each piece can be replanted with the growing points just below the soil surface, and will quickly grow into new plants. Offsets can also be purchased by mail order from specialist nurseries in order to initially build up a stock of plants.

== Phytochemistry, folk medicine, and toxicity ==
Folk medicine names for comfrey include knitbone, boneset, and the derivation of its Latin name Symphytum (from the Greek symphytis, meaning growing together of bones, and phyton, a plant), referring to its ancient uses. Similarly, the common French name is consoude, meaning to weld together. The tradition in different cultures and languages suggests a common belief in its usefulness for mending bones.

Comfrey contains mixed phytochemicals in varying amounts, including allantoin, mucilage, saponins, tannins, pyrrolizidine alkaloids, and inulin, among others. Pyrrolizidine alkaloids are responsible for comfrey's liver toxicity, which is associated with consuming this plant or its extracts. In modern herbalism, comfrey is most commonly used topically.

In 2001, the United States Food and Drug Administration issued a ban of comfrey products marketed for internal use, and a warning label for those intended for external use. Use of comfrey is particularly discouraged during pregnancy and lactation, in infants, and in people with liver, kidney, or vascular diseases.
