= Symphytum grandiflorum =

- At the University of Wrocław Botanical Garden

Scientific classification
- Kingdom: Plantae
- Clade: Tracheophytes
- Clade: Angiosperms
- Clade: Eudicots
- Clade: Asterids
- Order: Boraginales
- Family: Boraginaceae
- Genus: Symphytum
- Species: S. grandiflorum

Binomial name
- Symphytum grandiflorum DC.

Synonyms
- Symphytum abchasicum Trautv.; Symphytum ciscaucasium Gvin.; Symphytum cordatum M.Bieb.

Species of flowering plant

Symphytum grandiflorum, the creeping comfrey, or running comfrey is a species of flowering plant in the family Boraginaceae. It is native to the Caucasus region, and introduced to various locales in Europe as a garden escapee. A deer-tolerant perennial, it is hardy in USDA zones 5 through 8, and is recommended for borders and shady situations. The unimproved species and a number of cultivars are commercially available. Also, it has been crossed with Russian comfrey (Symphytum × uplandicum) to produce the multi-cross hybrid Hidcote comfrey (Symphytum × hidcotense, named after the Hidcote Manor Garden), of which a range of ornamental cultivars are available.

The official first formal scientific species description was published in 1846 by the Swiss botanist Alphonse Pyramus de Candolle (1806–1893). The specific epithet grandiflorum means "with large flowers".

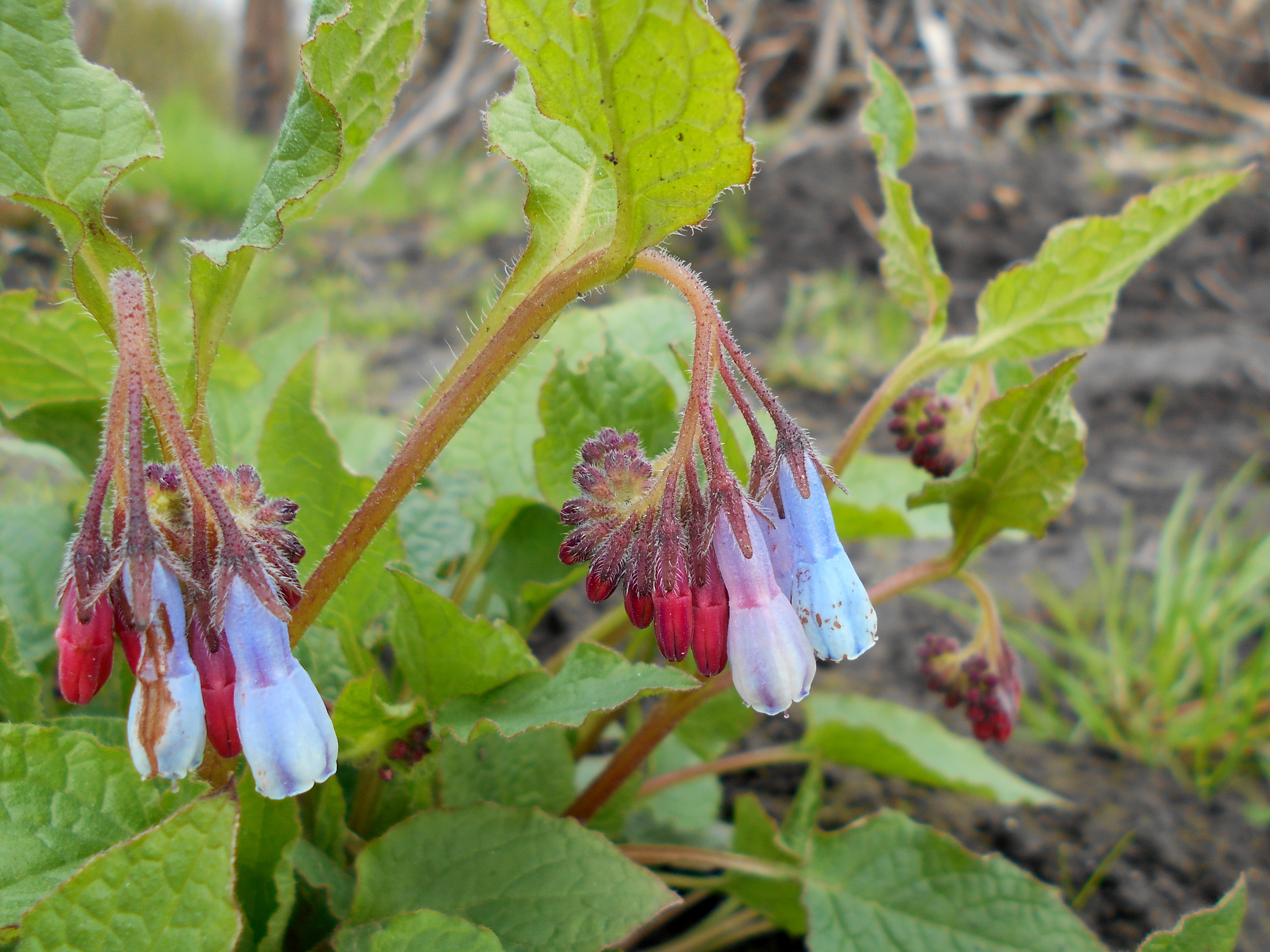
Close-up of flowers

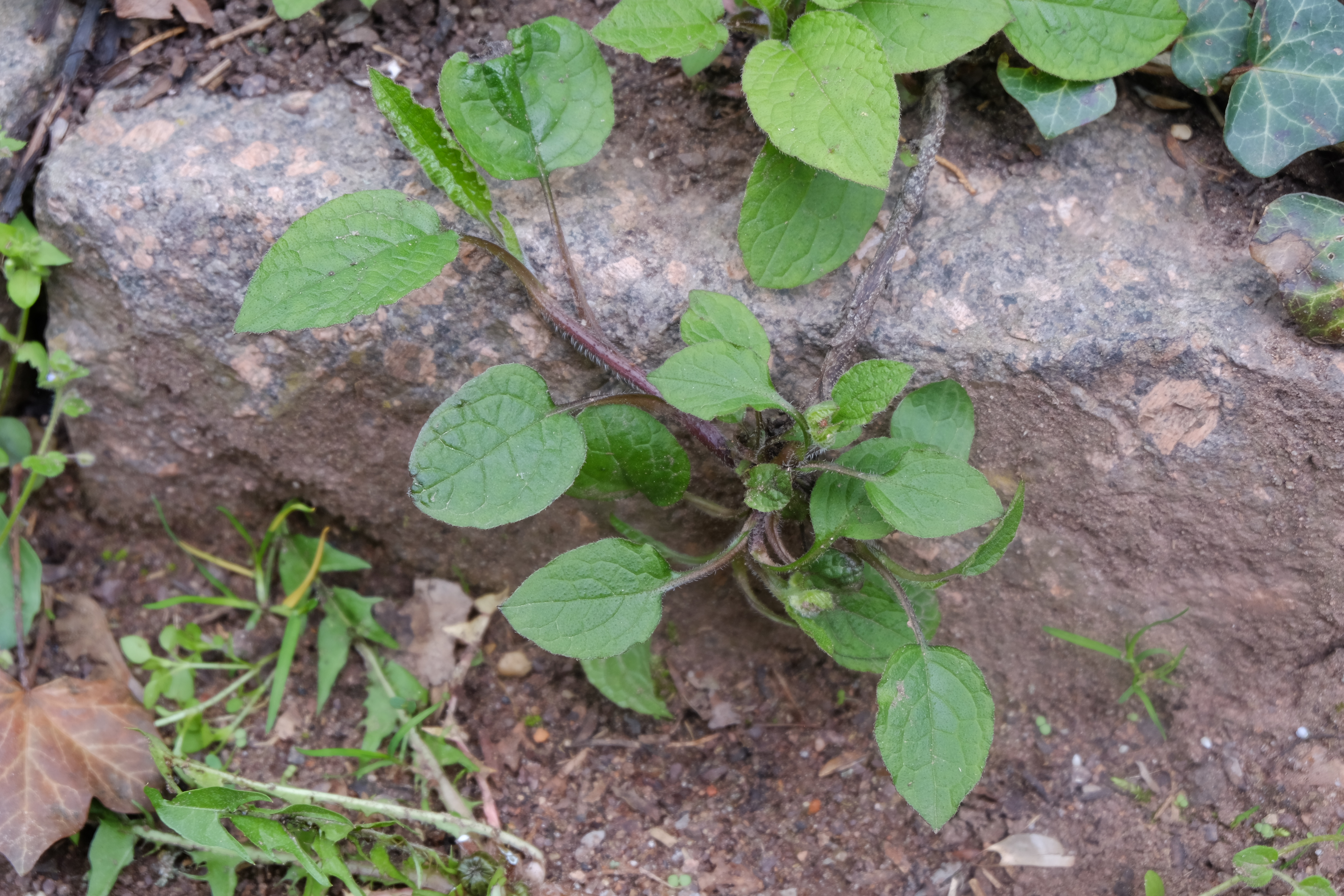
Creeping habit
