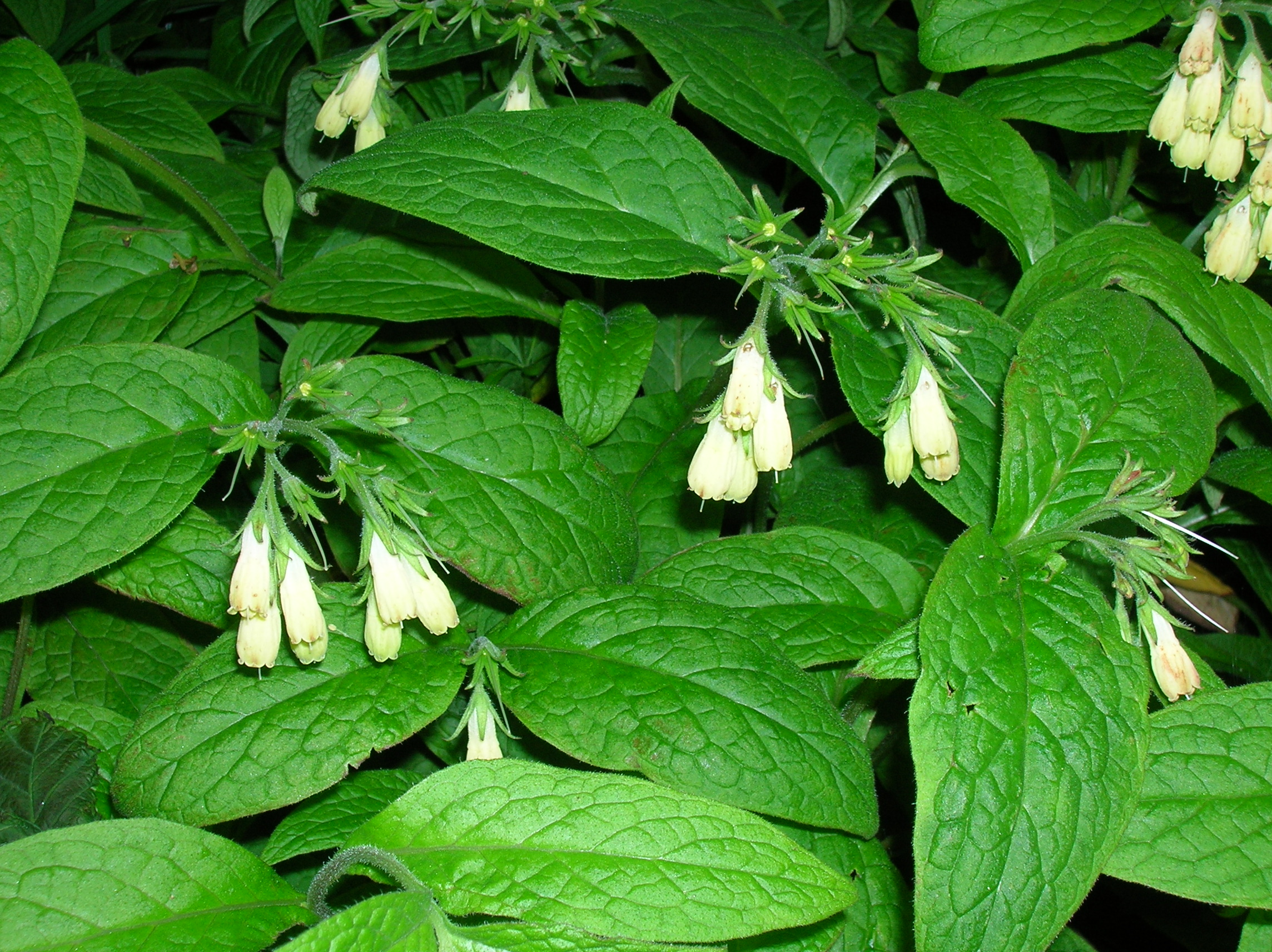

Scientific classification
- Kingdom: Plantae
- Clade: Embryophytes
- Clade: Tracheophytes
- Clade: Angiosperms
- Clade: Eudicots
- Clade: Asterids
- Order: Boraginales
- Family: Boraginaceae
- Genus: Symphytum
- Species: S. tuberosum

Binomial name
- Symphytum tuberosum L.

= Symphytum tuberosum =

Tuberous comfrey

Species of plant

Symphytum tuberosum, the tuberous comfrey, is a species of Symphytum in the family Boraginaceae.

== Species characteristics ==
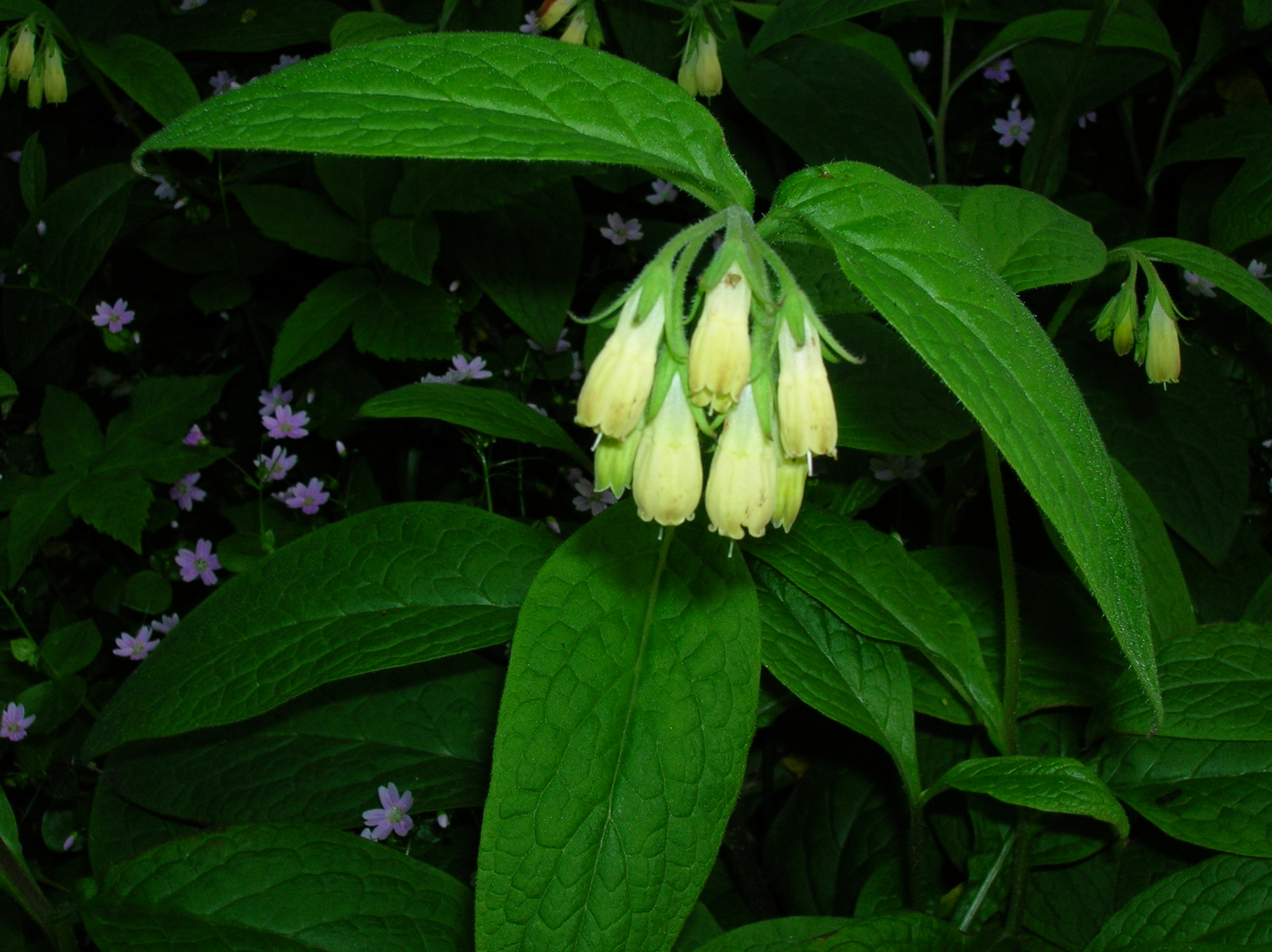
Tuberous comfrey flowers.

Tuberous comfrey flowers from April to June, however it also reproduces asexually, that is vegetatively, having rhizomes that allow it to spread out from the original site, colonising and competing as it grows. This process continues into the autumn and the young clonal plants can be seen at this time of year, whilst the parent plants leaves are rotting down. Being very hardy, this plant is well able to survive northern winters. Both the stems and leaves are softly hairy, the leaves have deep veining.

The flowers themselves are a subtle pale creamy yellow, a significant characteristic for separating its identity from the purple flowered Russian Comfrey. The usual pollinators are the common carder bumble bee, honey bee, and red mason bee. The stem and leaves are clothed with soft hairs. The stem usually remains unbranched and the leaves are distinctly veined with a clear reduction in size from top to base.

Tuberous comfrey goes dormant in the middle of the summer. Then starts growing again early autumn. Then goes dormant again in the winter, and starts growing late winter or early spring.

== Distribution ==
Symphytum tuberosum can be found throughout Europe. In Great Britain it is naturally less common in the south, and distribution maps show the species to be common in Scotland and present, but uncommon, throughout much of England and Wales.

On the Isle of Skye now it has a well-established and wide distribution thanks to planting, this has also occurred in Ireland. The North American west coast has a number of introduced S. tuberosum sites.

== Medicinal uses ==
Vernacular common names such as 'knitbone' reveal the healing role that tuberous comfrey and the various hybrid comfreys have played in herbal medicine throughout the ages. In these traditional cures, the recipes make use of the leaves & roots, the former being used to speed up the healing of minor abrasions through their being applied directly to the damaged skin under a compress.

== Culinary uses ==
In spring the fresh young leaves may be used as an herb in cooked recipes, however due to their hairy nature and mildly toxic properties they are not eaten raw. As with dandelion, the root makes a palatable and non-acidic alternative to coffee once prepared, roasted until brown & brittle, and grind it into a powder.
