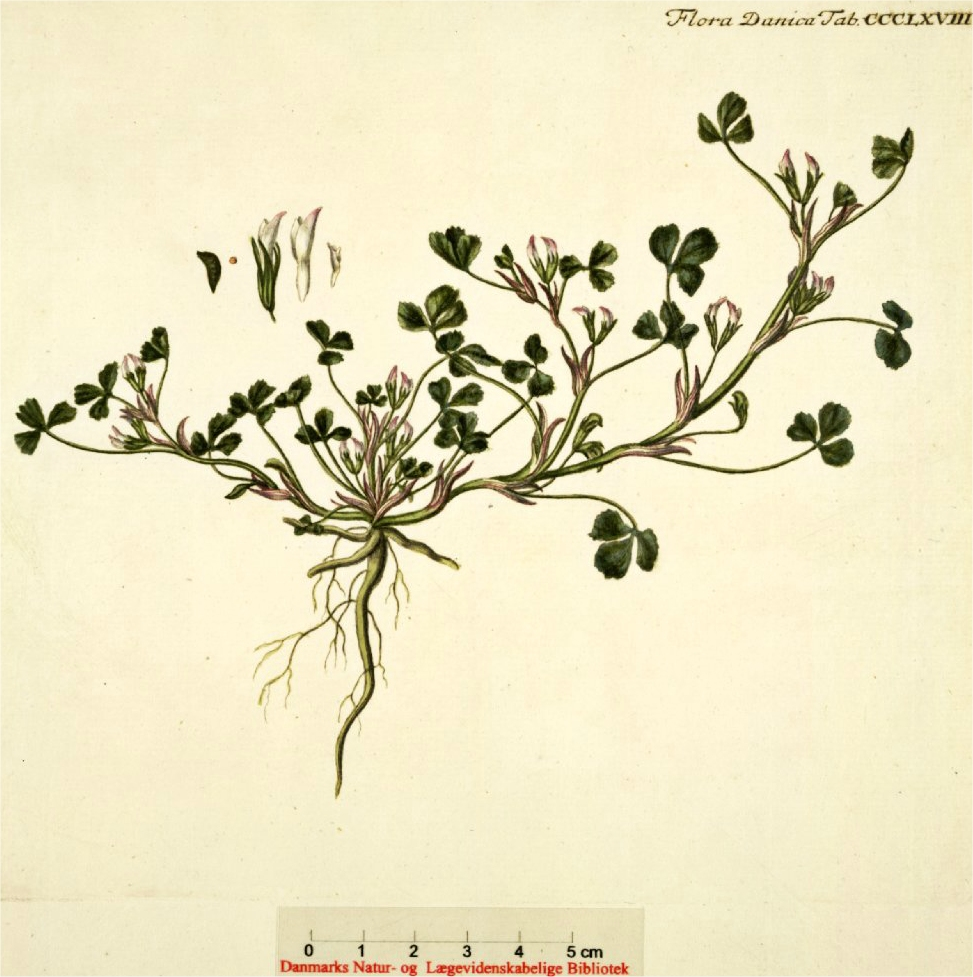
- Botanical illustration

Scientific classification
- Kingdom: Plantae
- Clade: Tracheophytes
- Clade: Angiosperms
- Clade: Eudicots
- Clade: Rosids
- Order: Fabales
- Family: Fabaceae
- Subfamily: Faboideae
- Genus: Trifolium
- Species: T. ornithopodioides

Binomial name
- Trifolium ornithopodioides L.

Synonyms
- List: Aporanthus trifoliastrum Bromf.; Falcatula falsotrifolium Brot.; Falcatula ornithopodioides (L.) Gasp.; Medicago ornithopodioides (L.) Trautv.; Melilotus ornithopodioides (L.) Desr.; Telis ornithopodioides (L.) Kuntze; Trifolium munbyi Širj.; Trifolium perpusillum Simonk.; Trigonella ornithopodioides (L.) DC.; Trigonella purpurascens Lam.; Trigonella uniflora Munby

= Trifolium ornithopodioides =

Species of plant in the legume family

Trifolium ornithopodioides, or the bird's foot clover, is a species of flowering plant in the family Fabaceae. It is native to Europe, Madeira, and northwestern Africa, and has been introduced to Australia and New Zealand. It is a halophyte.
