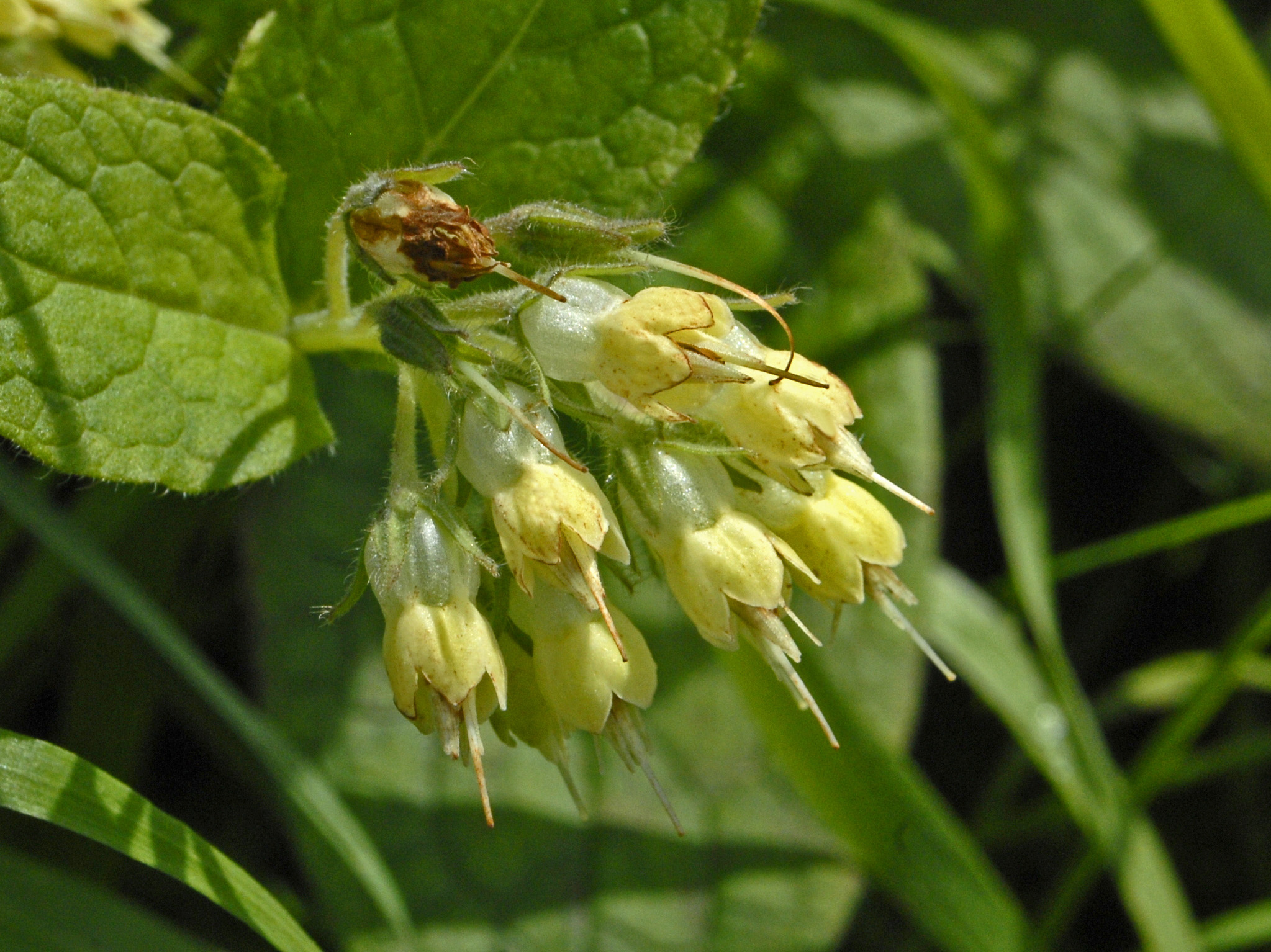
- Flowers of Symphytum bulbosum

Scientific classification
- Kingdom: Plantae
- Clade: Tracheophytes
- Clade: Angiosperms
- Clade: Eudicots
- Clade: Asterids
- Order: Boraginales
- Family: Boraginaceae
- Genus: Symphytum
- Species: S. bulbosum

Binomial name
- Symphytum bulbosum K. F. Schimp.

Synonyms
- Symphytum clusii Gmelin; Symphytum macrolepis J. Gay ex Rchb.; Symphytum punctatum Gaudin; Symphytum tuberosum subsp. bulbosum (K.F. Schimp.) P. Fourn.; Symphytum zeyheri K.F. Schimp.

= Symphytum bulbosum =

Species of plant

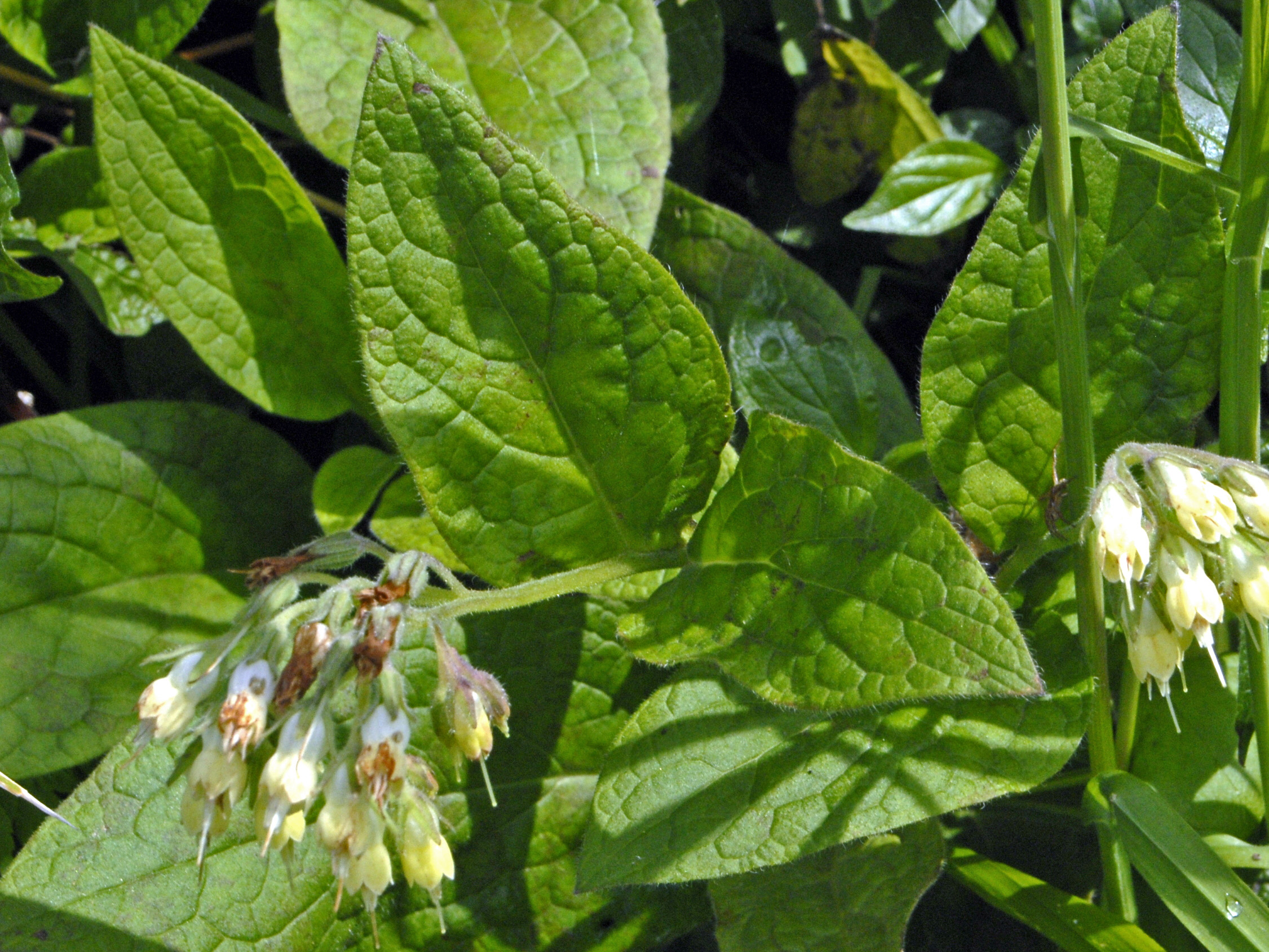
Leaves of Symphytum bulbosum

Symphytum bulbosum, common name bulbous comfrey, is a flowering plant of the genus Symphytum in the family Boraginaceae.

== Description ==
Symphytum bulbosum can reach a height between 15 and 50 centimeters. The petals are pale yellow, about 1 inch long. It flowers in March and April.

== Distribution ==
It is native to the Mediterranean region and it is present at an elevation of 0–1,000 metres (0–3,281 ft) above sea level.
