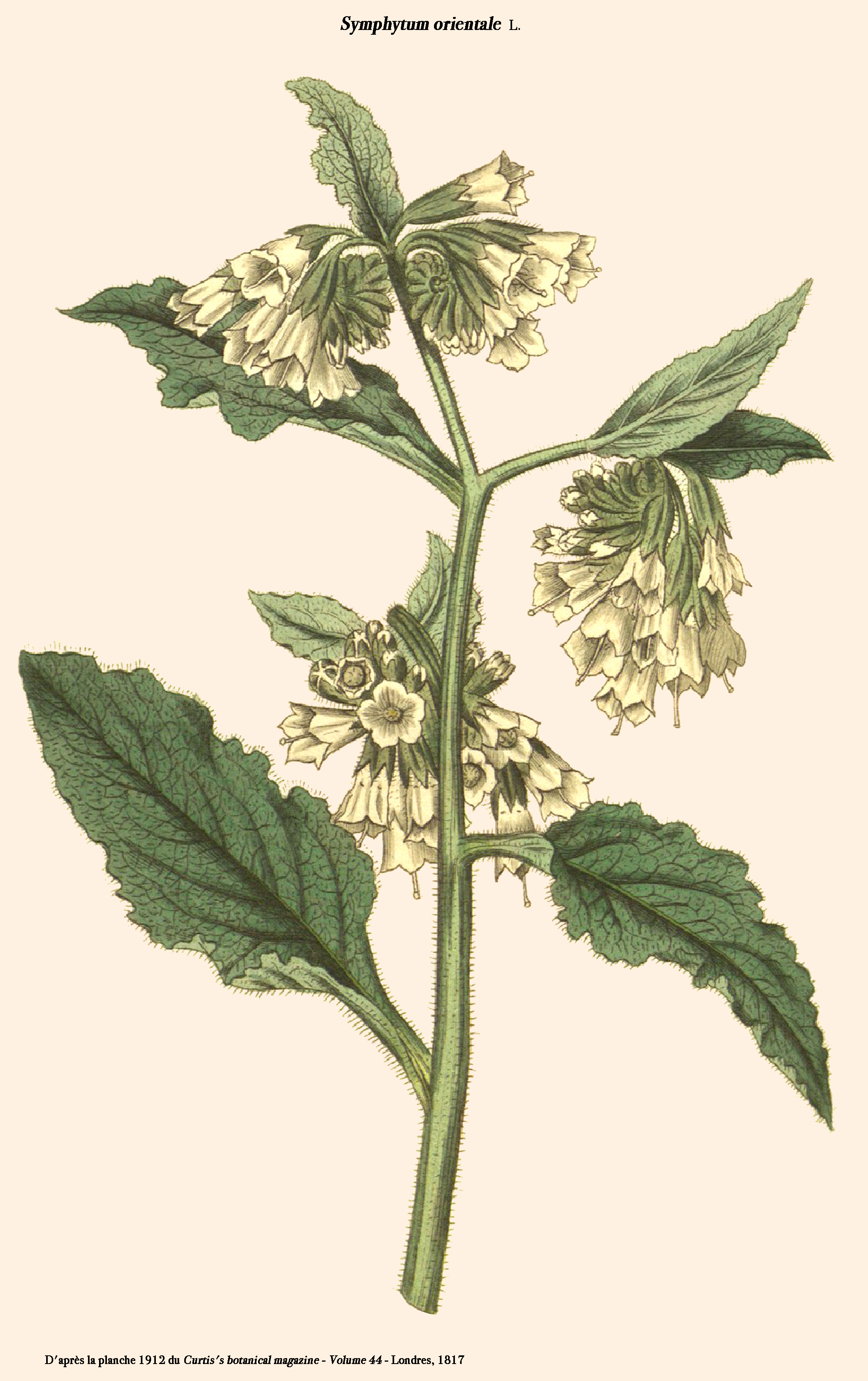

Scientific classification
- Kingdom: Plantae
- Clade: Tracheophytes
- Clade: Angiosperms
- Clade: Eudicots
- Clade: Asterids
- Order: Boraginales
- Family: Boraginaceae
- Genus: Symphytum
- Species: S. orientale

Binomial name
- Symphytum orientale L.

= Symphytum orientale =

Species of flowering plant

Symphytum orientale is a species of flowering plant belonging to the family Boraginaceae. It was first described in 1753 by Carl Linnaeus.

Its native range is Turkey, Ukraine to Caucasus.
