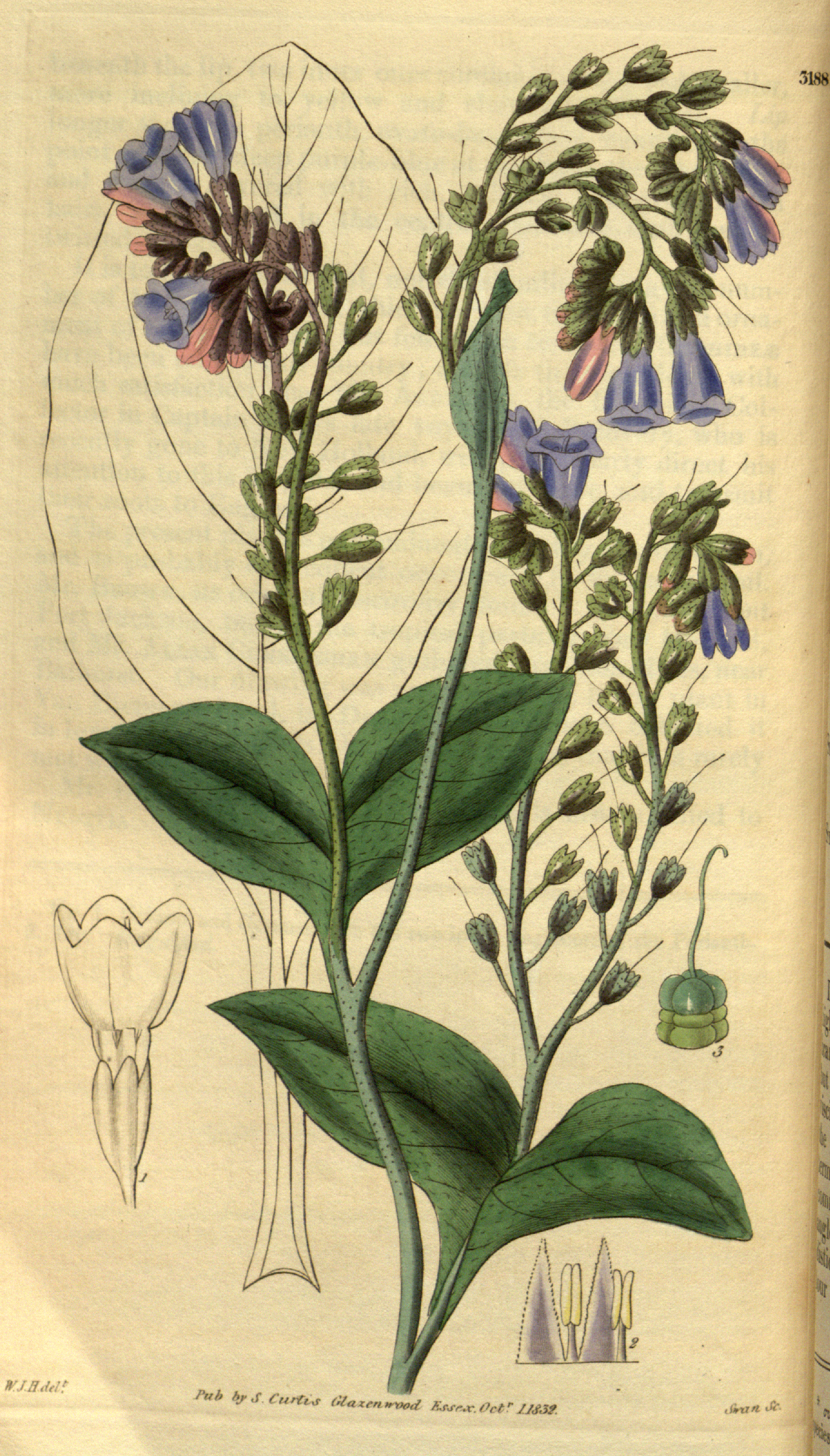

Scientific classification
- Kingdom: Plantae
- Clade: Tracheophytes
- Clade: Angiosperms
- Clade: Eudicots
- Clade: Asterids
- Order: Boraginales
- Family: Boraginaceae
- Genus: Symphytum
- Species: S. caucasicum

Binomial name
- Symphytum caucasicum M.Bieb.

= Symphytum caucasicum =

Caucasian comfrey

Species of plant

Symphytum caucasicum, the beinwell, blue comfrey, or Caucasian comfrey, is an ornamental plant of genus Symphytum in the family Boraginaceae, which is native to the Caucasus.
