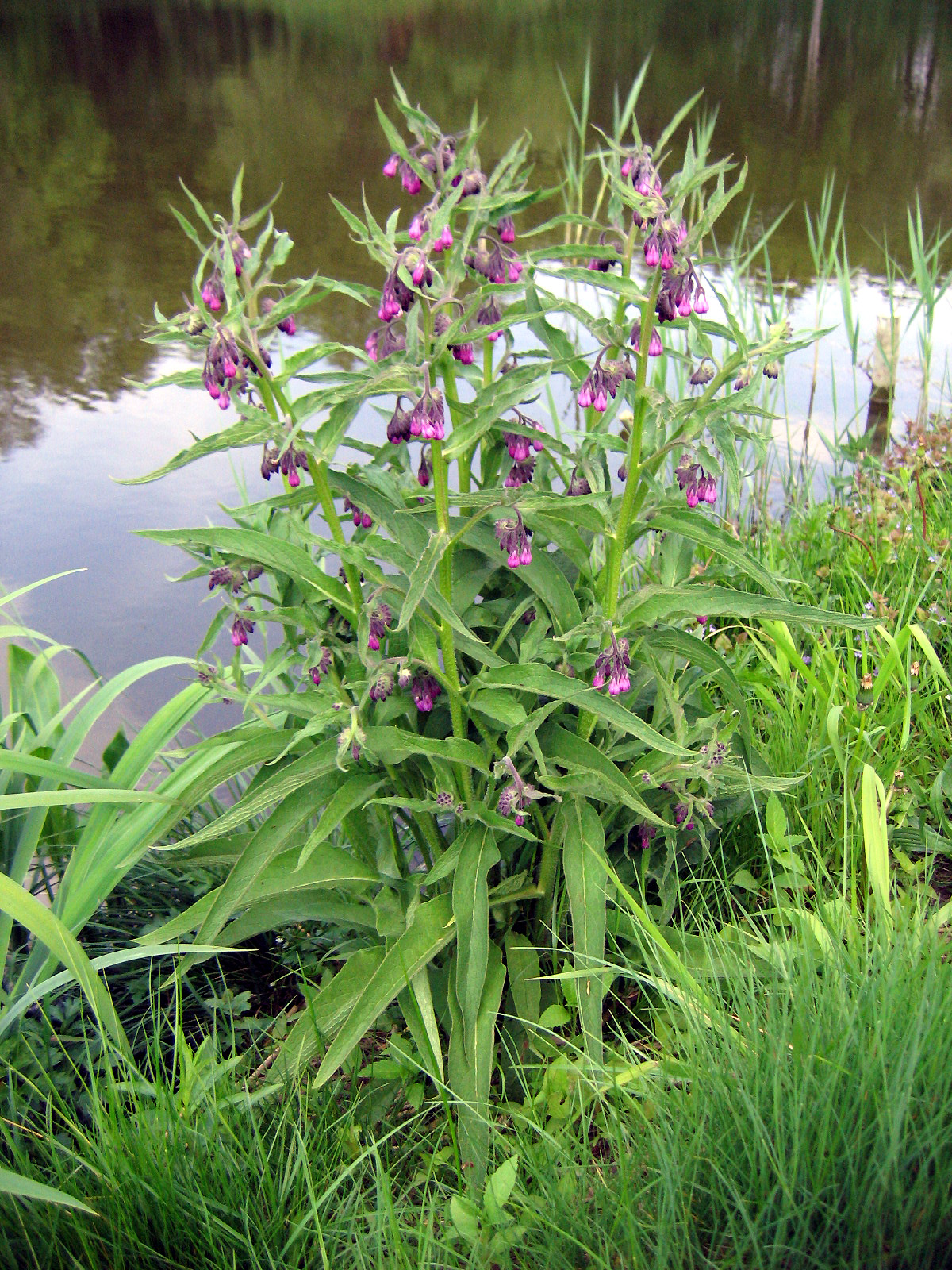

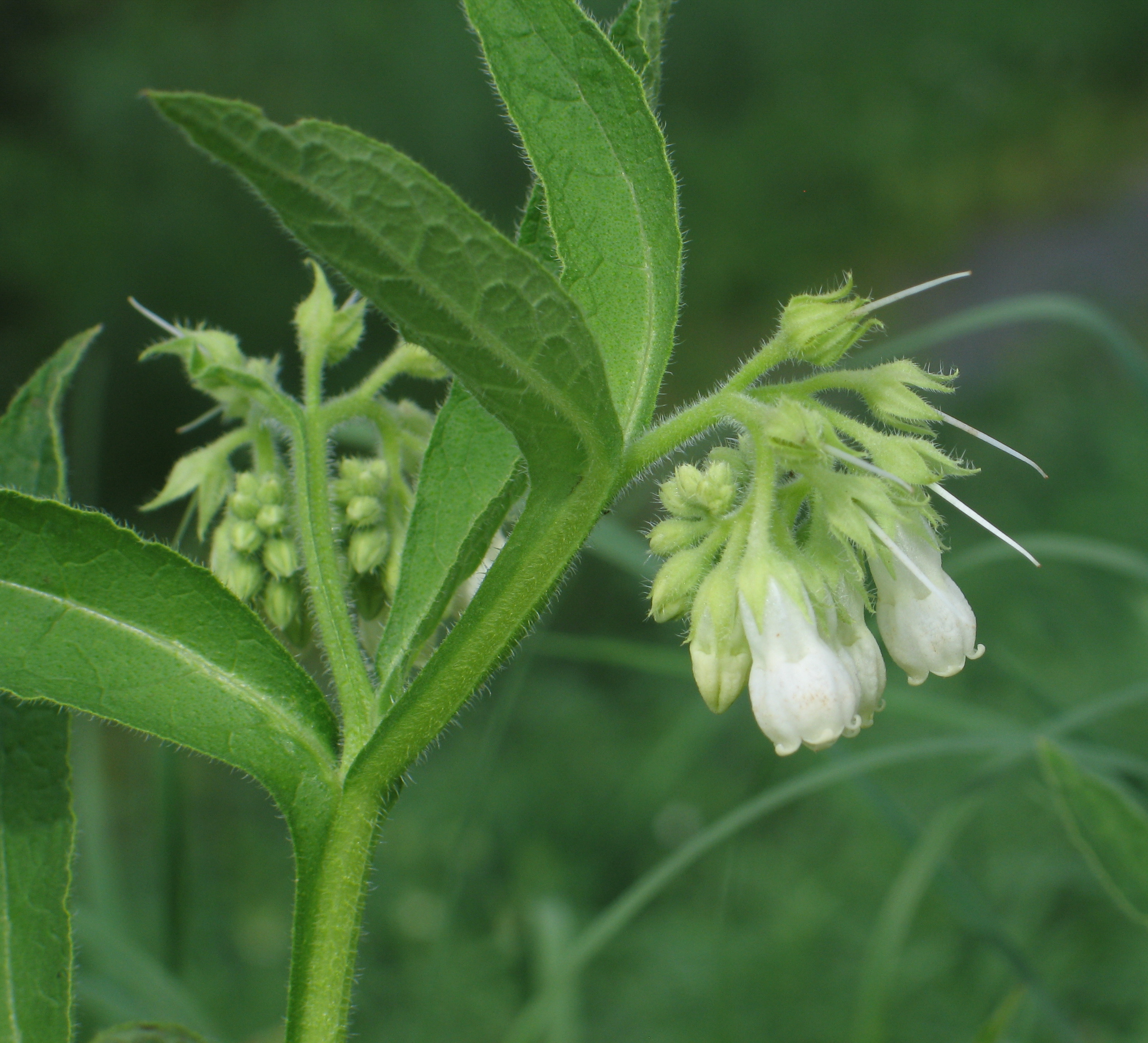

Scientific classification
- Kingdom: Plantae
- Clade: Embryophytes
- Clade: Tracheophytes
- Clade: Angiosperms
- Clade: Eudicots
- Clade: Asterids
- Order: Boraginales
- Family: Boraginaceae
- Genus: Symphytum
- Species: S. officinale

Binomial name
- Symphytum officinale L.

Synonyms
- Symphitum officinale (orth.var.)

= Symphytum officinale =

Species of flowering plant in the borage family

Symphytum officinale is a perennial flowering plant in the family Boraginaceae. Along with 34 other species of Symphytum, it is known as comfrey (from the Latin confervere to 'heal' or literally to 'boil together', referring to uses in ancient traditional medicine). Internal or long-term topical use of comfrey is discouraged due to its strong potential to cause liver toxicity.

To differentiate it from other members of the genus Symphytum, this species is known as common comfrey or true comfrey. Other English names include boneset, knitbone, consound, and slippery-root.

It is native to Europe, growing in damp, grassy places. It is found throughout Ireland and Britain on river banks and ditches. It occurs in North America as an introduced species and weed. The flowers are mostly visited by bumblebees.

== History ==
Over centuries, comfrey was cultivated in Asia, and Europe including the United Kingdom as a vegetable and herbal medicine. Its early common names, knitbone or boneset, reflect its historical use by poultices of leaves and roots to treat sprains, bruises or bone fractures. The roots were mashed then packed around a broken limb, and once dried they formed a hardened 'plaster cast'.

== Description ==
The plant can grow 0.3–1.5 metres (1–5 ft) tall with branched, strongly winged stems. The root system has a pronounced taproot, reaching up to 1.8 m deep. The internally white roots are covered with black bark. Above ground the plant is covered in long, downward-pointing, tapering hairs that are bristly on the stems and softer on the leaves. Along the erect stems grow large simple, mostly stalked leaves in an alternate pattern. They are oval-lanceolate and 4 to 25 centimetres (1 1/2 to 10 in) long. In the upper parts they are narrower, without stalks, and with margins that extend down the stems. The chromosome count is 2n = 24, 26, 36, 40, 48 or 54.

=== Inflorescence and fruit ===
The plant flowers from May to June with forked cymes that are initially coiled and later open out. They bear two rows of hermaphrodite flowers on nodding stalks that are 2 to 6 millimetres (1/16 to 1/4 in) long. The small flowers measure 8–20 mm (1/4–3/4 in) in length and 12 to 18 mm across the corolla. The flowers are radially symmetrical with five equal petals that are fused into a tubular or narrowly bell-shaped corolla with pointed, recurved teeth that are 2 mm long. Petals come in mainly two colours – typically cream to yellow or pink to purplish. Inside are 5 stamens and 1 stigma. The calyx has a tubular segment of about 2 mm and narrow, pointed teeth of about 4 mm. The fruits are segmented into 4 egg-shaped, shiny black nutlets that are 5–6 mm long. The plant produces significant nectar when compared to other UK plants tested. Although, it has a long tube, meaning only insects with long tongues can reach the nectar, some bees have been known to bite into the side of the flower to access the nectar – a foraging behaviour known as nectar robbing.

=== Species differentiation ===
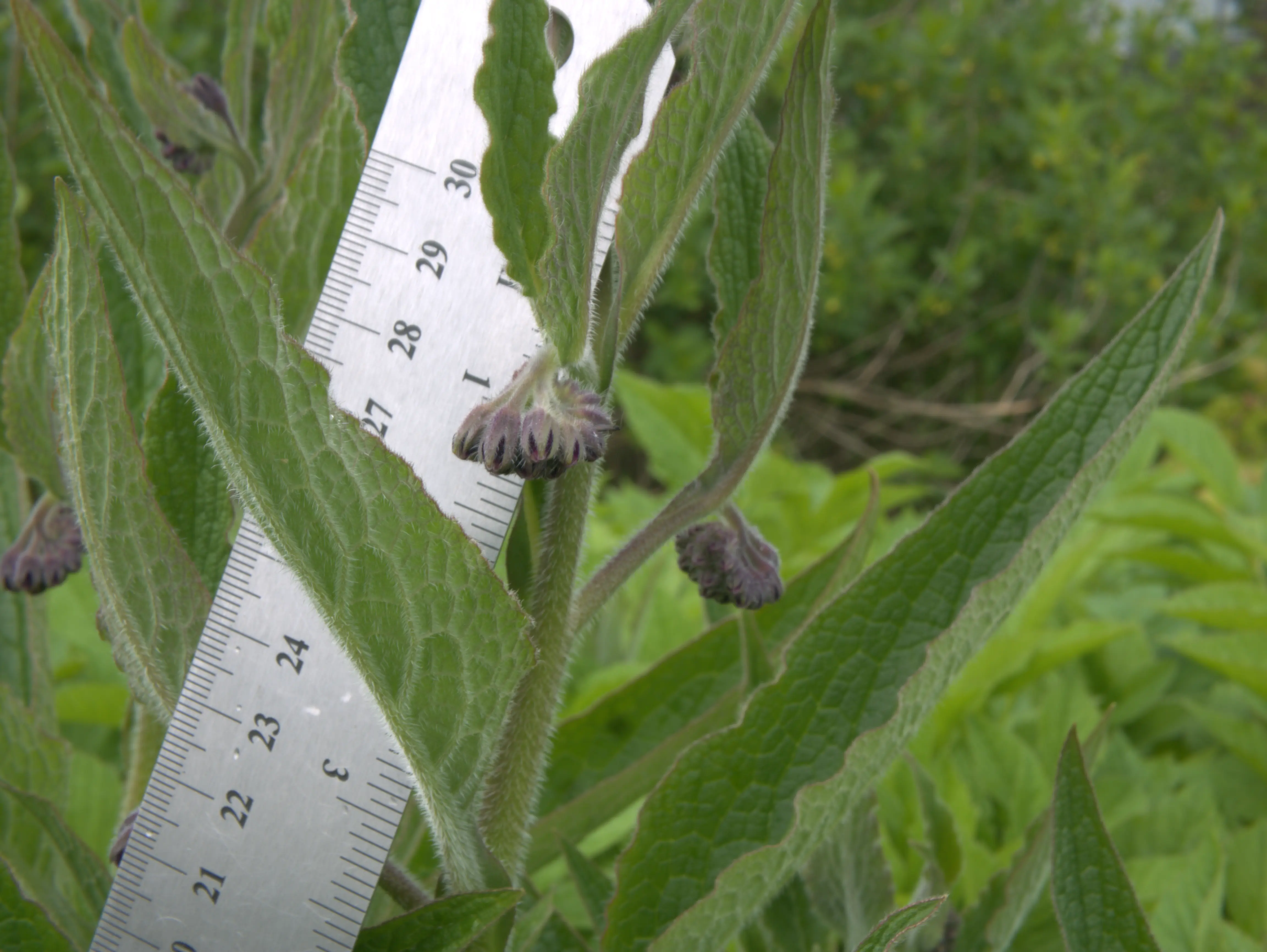
Decurrent leaf bases of common comfrey

With Symphytum × uplandicum, leaf bases are not decurrent, stem internodes are not winged, and the surfaces of the seeds are brown, dull, and finely granular instead of shiny black. Additionally, S. × uplandicum is generally more bristly, flowers later (between June and August), and its flowers tend to be more blue or violet.

== Taxonomy ==
The latin name epithet officinale refers to its use for medicinal preparations. The official first formal scientific species description appeared in 1753 in Species Plantarum by Carl Linnaeus, Tomus I, page 136.

Subspecies include subsp. uliginosum (A. Kern.) Nyman (syn. S. uliginosum auct. non Kern., S. tanaicense), subsp. officinale, and subsp. bohemicum (F. W. Schmidt) Čelak (syn. S. bohemicum).

A common hybrid is formed between Symphytum officinale and S. asperum, Symphytum × uplandicum, also known as Blue Comfrey, or Russian comfrey, which is widespread in the British Isles, interbreeds with S. officinale, and represents the economically most important kind of comfrey.

== Distribution and habitat ==
Comfrey is found in moist grasslands or along riverbanks and ditches in western Asia, Europe, and North America. It is a perennial herb that is cold hardy down to −35 °C (−31 °F) and drought tolerant.

== Toxicity ==
Comfrey is mildly toxic. Like most Boraginaceae, it contains pyrrolizidine alkaloids which are toxic compounds readily absorbed via the stomach or skin, and have potential to increase the risk of fatal liver toxicity. In 2001, the US Food and Drug Administration and Federal Trade Commission banned the sale of comfrey products for internal use and use on open wounds due to its potential toxicities. A 2018 review on pyrrolizidine alkaloids present in comfrey indicated widespread potential toxicity to humans and livestock, and the opportunity for drug development from these compounds.

== Uses ==
Despite its toxicity, the leaves and shoots have been considered edible, even raw; the stalks are said to be best collected prior to flowering and blanched prior to steaming; the leaves may also be used in tea.

=== Traditional medicine ===
In folklore, Symphytum officinale roots were used in traditional medicine internally (as a herbal tea or tincture) or externally (as ointment, compresses, or alcoholic extract) for treatment of various disorders. John Gerard, an English herbalist (1545–1612), mentions "the slimie substance of the roote made in a possett of ale" would help back pains. Poultices may be used with the intent to heal broken bones, giving it the name "knitbone". For such topical uses, comfrey can be infused in oil to then be mixed into ointments or balms.

In 2004, a double-blind, randomized study of patients suffering from acute ankle sprains found that comfrey's anti-inflammatory and analgesic properties to be highly effective, in addition to its tissue regenerating abilities. No adverse reactions were observed.

A 2013 review of clinical studies assessing the possible effect of comfrey on osteoarthritis found the research quality was too low to allow conclusions about its efficacy and safety. In Europe as of 2015, there were no comfrey products for oral use, and those for topical uses to treat bruises or joint pain were evaluated as having risk of liver toxicity.
