= Liriomyza eupatorii =

Scientific classification
- Kingdom: Animalia
- Phylum: Arthropoda
- Class: Insecta
- Order: Diptera
- Family: Agromyzidae
- Subfamily: Phytomyzinae
- Genus: Liriomyza
- Species: L. eupatorii

Binomial name
- Liriomyza eupatorii (Kaltenbach, 1874)

Synonyms
- Agromyza eupatorii Kaltenbach, 1874; Liriomyza orbitella Hendel, 1931

Species of fly

Liriomyza eupatorii is a species of fly in the family Agromyzidae. The fly, is found in Europe and was described by the German entomolgist, Johann Heinrich Kaltenbach in 1874.

The larvae mine the leaves of the Asteraceae and the Lamiaceae, including Aster species, lesser snakeroot (Ageratina aromatica), hemp-agrimony (Eupatorium cannabinum), red hemp-nettle (Galeopsis ladanum var. angustifolia), hairy hemp-nettle (Galeopsis pubescens), downy hemp-nettle (Galeopsis segetum), large-flowered hemp-nettle (Galeopsis speciosa), common hemp-nettle (Galeopsis tetrahit), sunflowers (Helianthus species), common nipplewort (Lapsana communis) and European goldenrod (Solidago virgaurea).

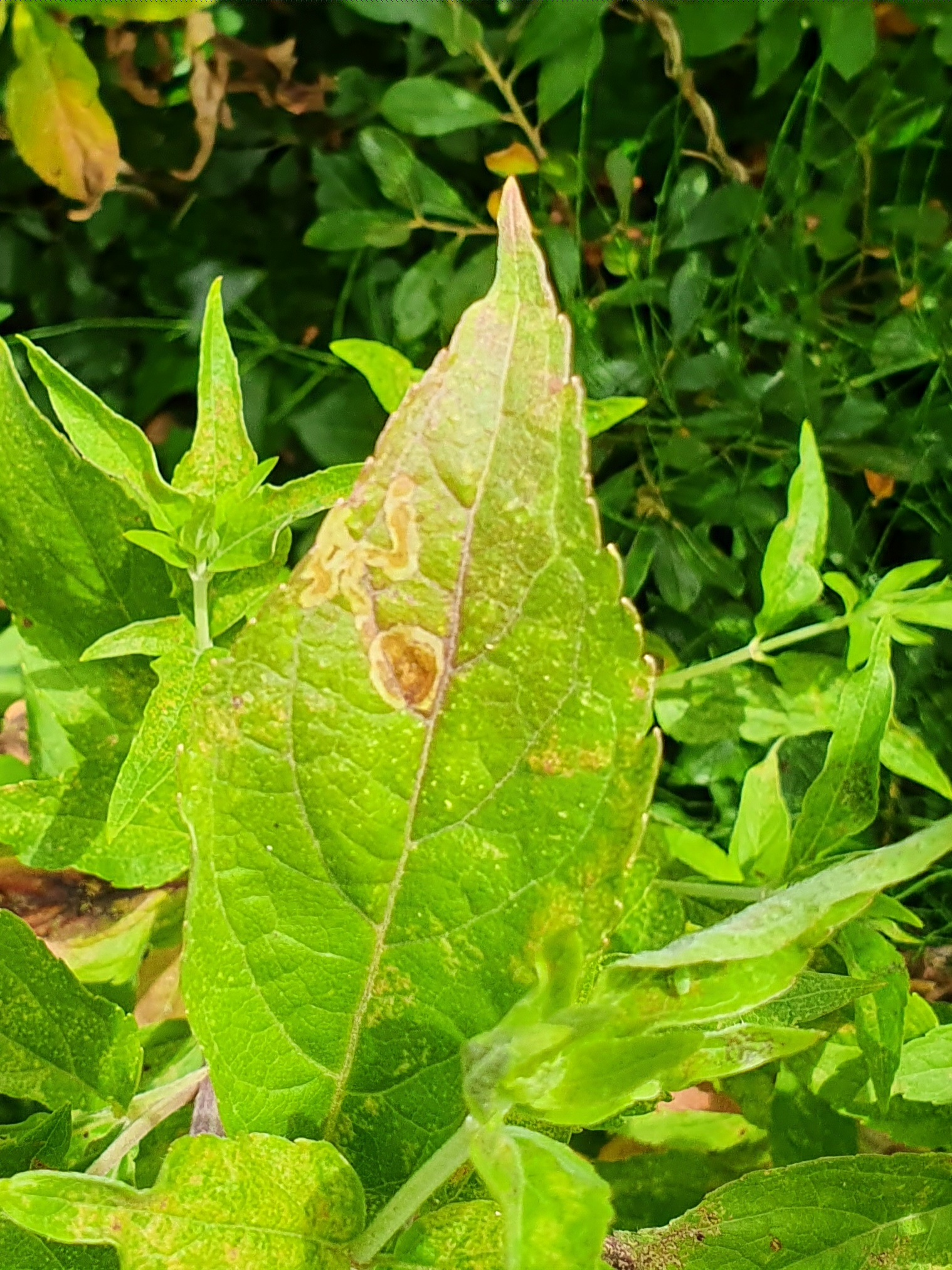
Liriomyza eupatorii leaf mine on hemp-agrimony
