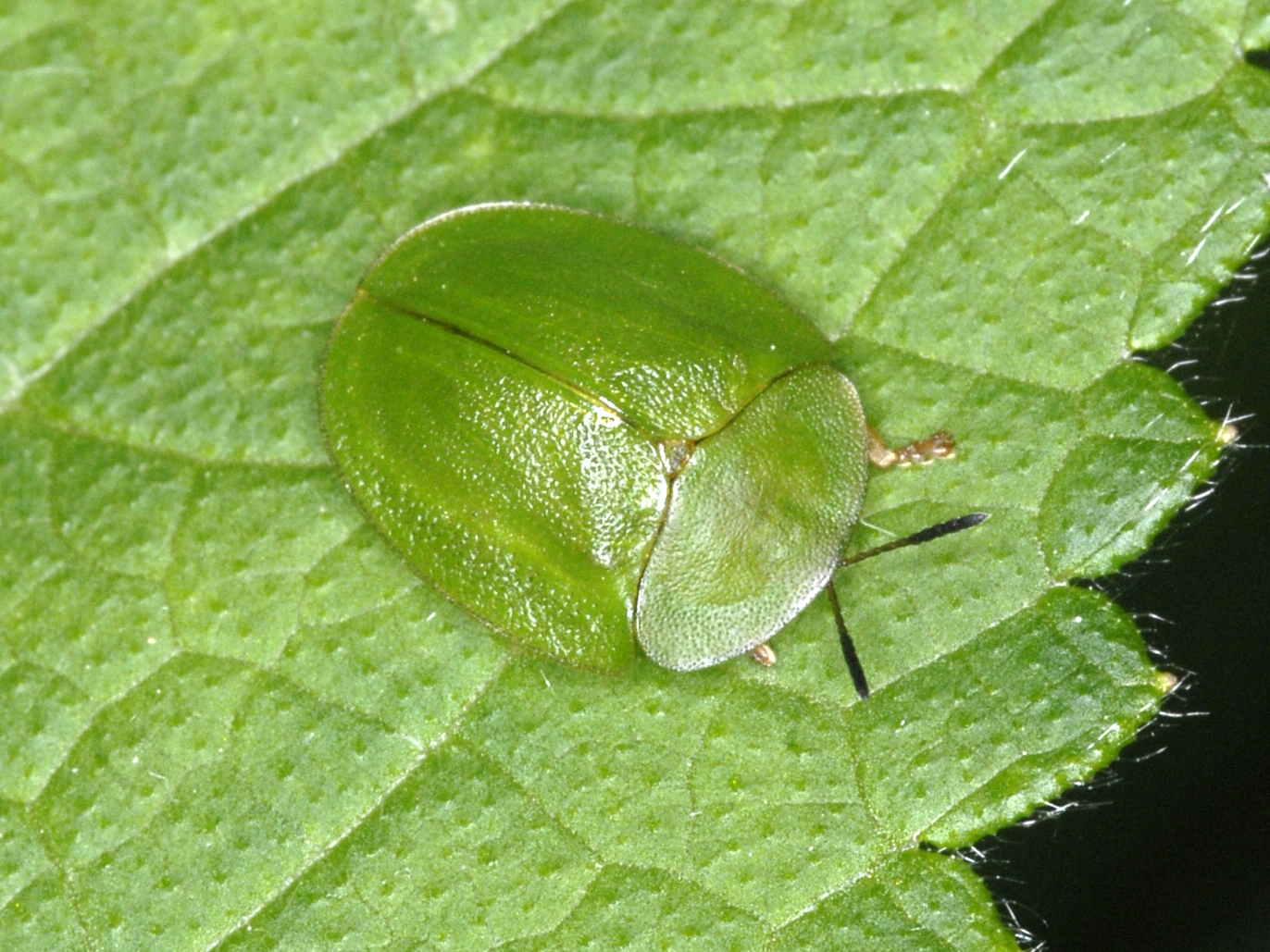

Scientific classification
- Kingdom: Animalia
- Phylum: Arthropoda
- Class: Insecta
- Order: Coleoptera
- Suborder: Polyphaga
- Infraorder: Cucujiformia
- Family: Chrysomelidae
- Genus: Cassida
- Species: C. viridis

Binomial name
- Cassida viridis Linnaeus, 1758

Synonyms
- Cassida equestris Fabricius, 1787; Cassida flaviceps Marseul, 1878; Odontionycha viridis

= Cassida viridis =

Species of beetle

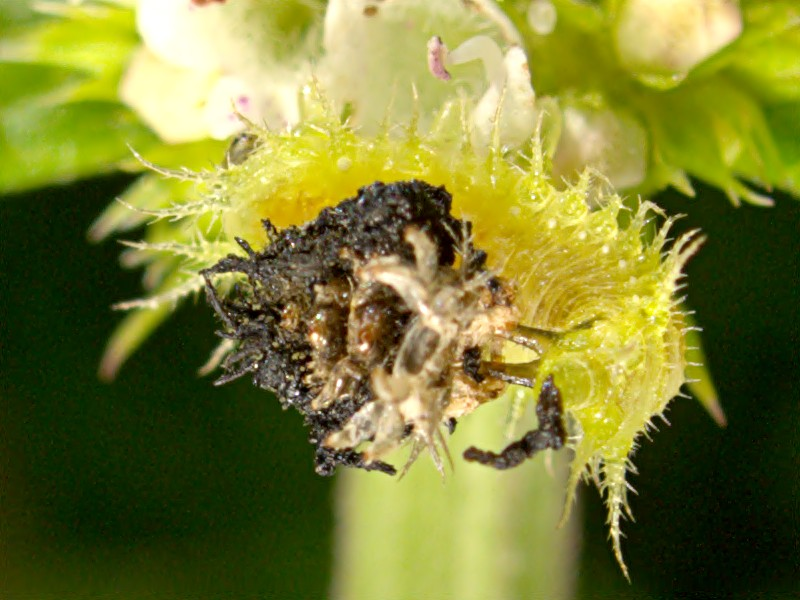
Larva with fecal shield

Cassida viridis, common name green tortoise beetle, is a species of beetle in the leaf beetle family (Chrysomelidae).

== Description ==
Cassida viridis can reach a length of 8.5–10 millimetres (0.33–0.39 in). The body is unusually flat and oval-shaped. The thorax and elytra are green, without the markings characterizing other Cassida species. Punctation on the elytra is entirely uniform. Both the legs and the rather short, threadlike antennae are brown. The underside is black. These extremely mimetic beetles can be encountered from April to October.

Usually they stay on their food plants, which mainly include various mints (Mentha aquatica, Mentha arvensis, Mentha longifolia, Mentha rotundifolia, Mentha suaveolens, Mentha verticillata), but also other plants of family Lamiaceae (Galeopsis grandiflora, Galeopsis speciosa, Galeopsis tetrahit, Galeopsis pubescens, Melissa officinalis, Salvia glutinosa, Salvia officinalis, Salvia pratensis, Stachys palustris, Stachys recta and Stachys sylvatica).

The larvae are very spiny. For protection against enemies and parasites, they usually bear their excrement on two spines on the upper side (fecal shield).

== Distribution ==
This species can be found in most of Europe, in the eastern Palearctic realm, in the Near East, and in North Africa. It has recently been discovered to have been introduced into southern Ontario, Canada, as early as 1974.

== Habit ==
They mainly inhabit low vegetation in open areas, such as meadows or shores.
