= List of crambid genera: Y =

The large moth family Crambidae contains the following genera beginning with "Y":

- Yezobotys
