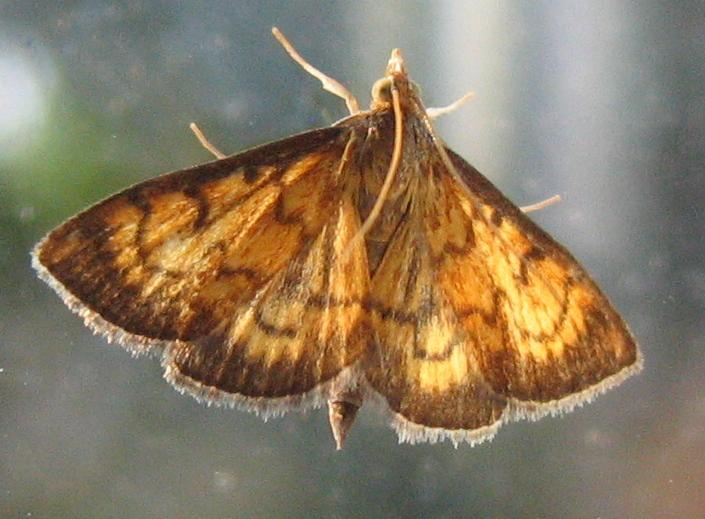

Scientific classification
- Kingdom: Animalia
- Phylum: Arthropoda
- Clade: Pancrustacea
- Class: Insecta
- Order: Lepidoptera
- Family: Crambidae
- Genus: Ecpyrrhorrhoe
- Species: E. rubiginalis

Binomial name
- Ecpyrrhorrhoe rubiginalis (Hübner, 1796)

Synonyms
- Pyralis rubiginalis Hübner, 1796; Ecpyrrhorrhoe rubiginalis microlimbalis (Amsel, 1959); Pionea rubiginalis f. denigratalis Hartig & Amsel, 1952

= Ecpyrrhorrhoe rubiginalis =

Species of moth

Ecpyrrhorrhoe rubiginalis is a species of moth of the family Crambidae. It was described by Jacob Hübner in 1796 and is found in central and southern Europe.

The wingspan is 16–22 mm.

The larvae feed on Stachys officinalis, Galeopsis tetrahit and Ballota nigra.
