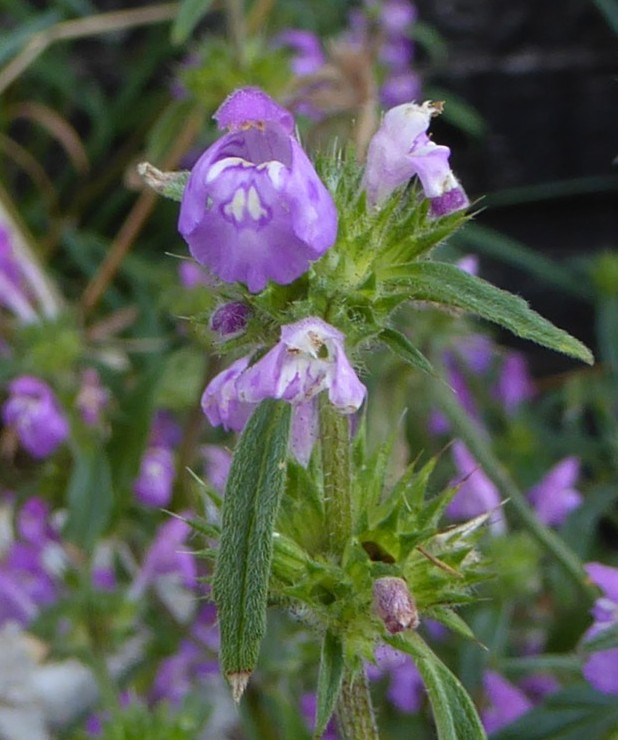

Scientific classification
- Kingdom: Plantae
- Clade: Tracheophytes
- Clade: Angiosperms
- Clade: Eudicots
- Clade: Asterids
- Order: Lamiales
- Family: Lamiaceae
- Genus: Galeopsis
- Species: G. angustifolia

Binomial name
- Galeopsis angustifolia Ehrh. ex Hoffm.

Synonyms
- List: Dalanum angustifolium (Ehrh. ex Hoffm.) Dostál; Galeopsis arvatica Jord.; Galeopsis bertetii E.P. Perrier & Songeon ex Verlot; Galeopsis calcarea Schönh.; Galeopsis canescens Schult.; Galeopsis glabra Des Étangs; Galeopsis glaucescens Reut. ex Ard.; Galeopsis inermis Posp.; Galeopsis orophila Timb.-Lagr.; Galeopsis rivas-martinezii Mateo & M.B. Crespo; Ladanella angustifolia (Ehrh. ex Hoffm.) Pouzar & Slavíková; Ladanum angustifolium (Ehrh. ex Hoffm.) Slavíková

= Galeopsis angustifolia =

Species of flowering plant

Galeopsis angustifolia, red hemp-nettle, is an annual plant that is native to western Europe and increasingly occurs as a casual in eastern Europe. Its wild habitat is in montane scree in the Alps and Pyrenees, or on coastal shingle, but it is widely established on waste ground, arable fields and gravelly substrates. It was much more common on farmland in the past, where it was sometimes confused with Galeopsis ladanum.

== Description ==
Red hemp-nettle is an annual monoecious herb that grows up to 50 cm tall, with an upright or sprawling habit. The stems are square in section, frequently branched, and covered in simple white hairs and sometimes reddish glandular hairs. The leaves are opposite and decussate with short petioles and no stipules. The blade is lanceolate to narrowly oval, 2-3 cm long (exceptionally, up to 8 cm) with several shallow teeth along each margin.

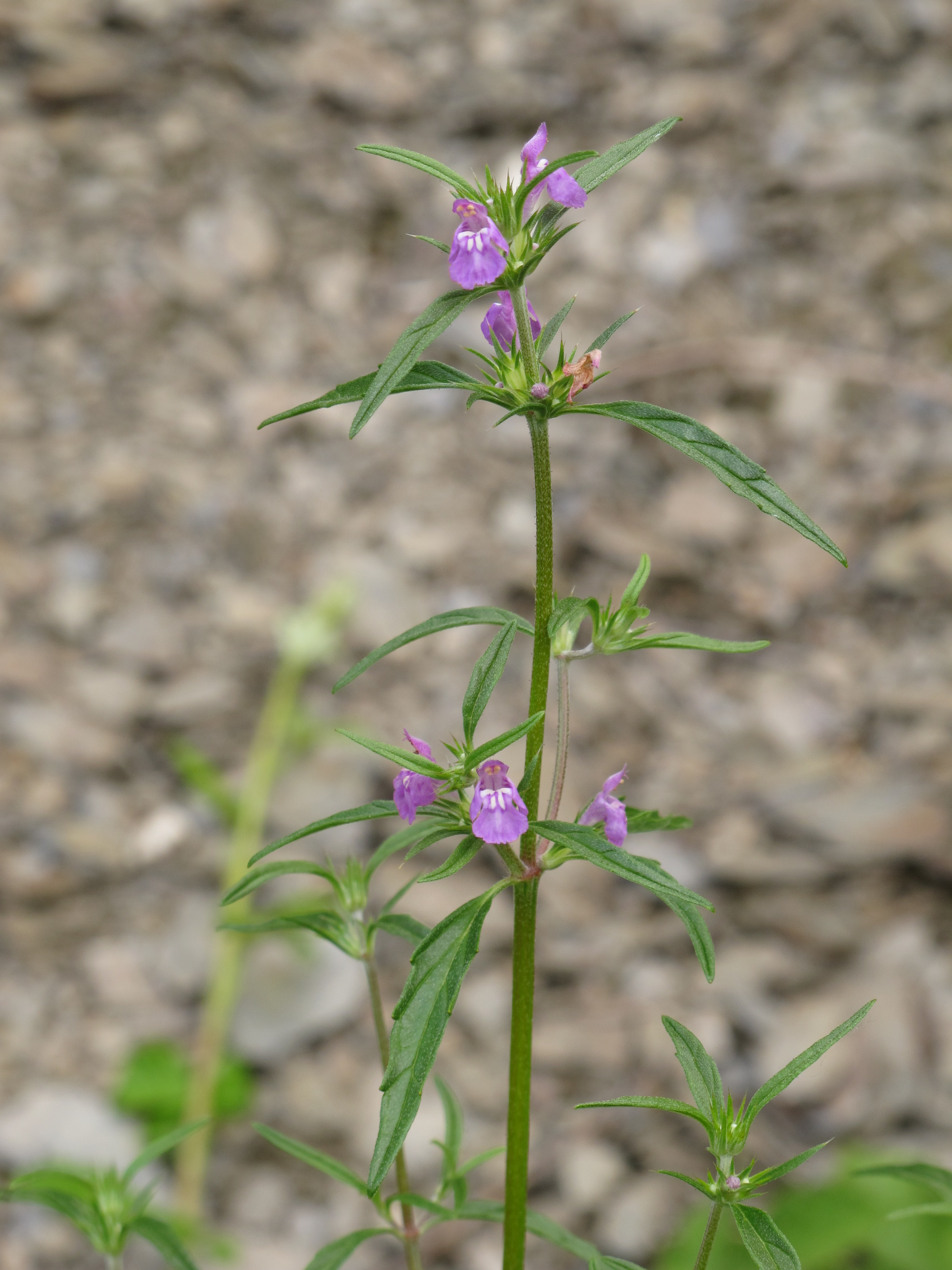
Red hemp-nettle at Rheinsteig hiking trail near Lorchhausen, Germany

Flowering occurs between June and October. The inflorescence consists of one or more crowded whorls of flowers interspersed with leaf-like bracts. The flowers are bisexual and have a tubular calyx about 8 mm long with five equal lobes, a purple corolla about 25 mm long with a yellow blotch on the lower lip, four stamens with yellow anthers and one style. The fruit consists of four trigonous nutlets about 2 mm across.

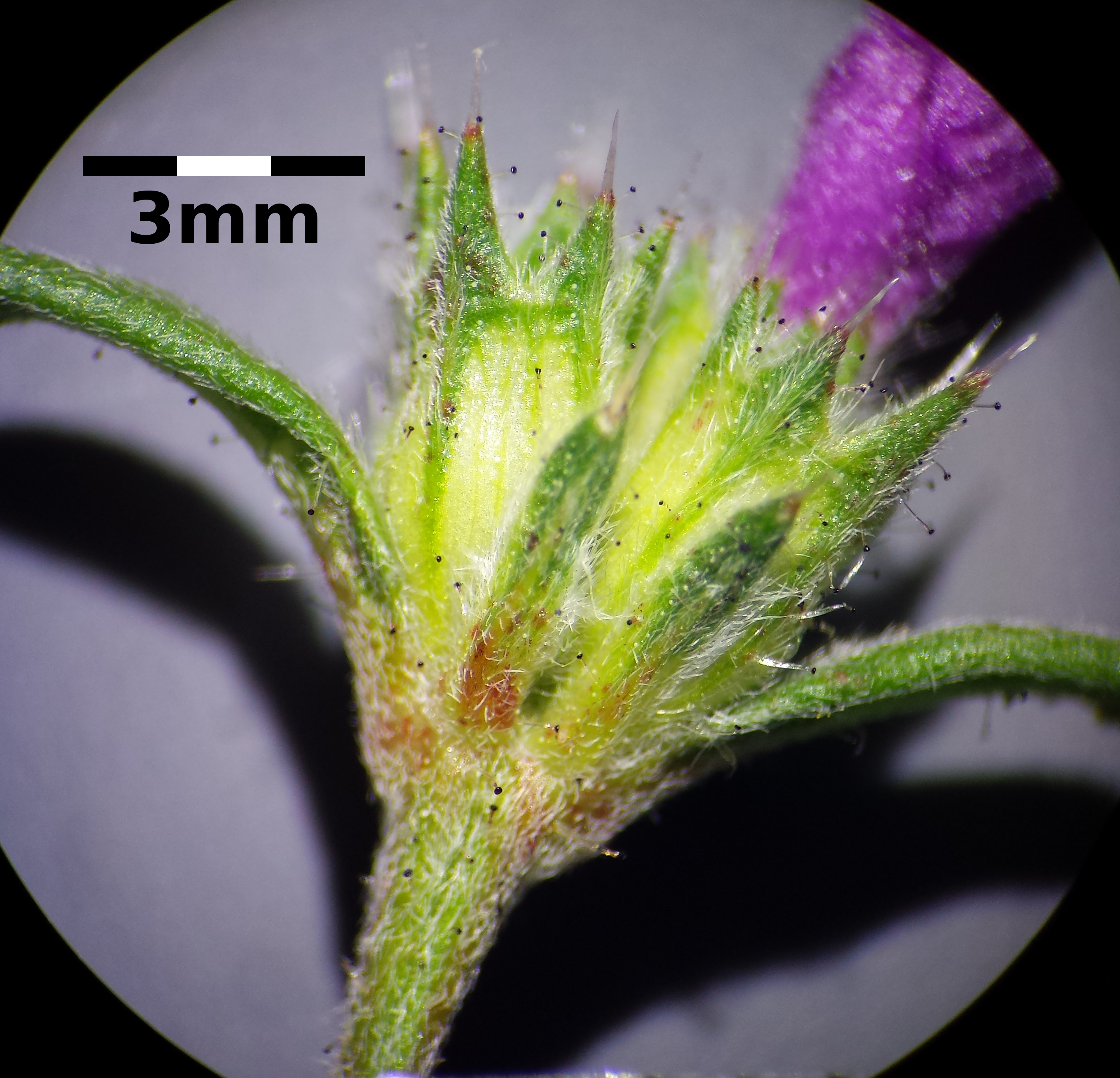
Details of the inflorescence

== Taxonomy ==
It has always been difficult to separate red hemp-nettle from broad-leaved hemp-nettle, Galeopsis ladanum. Leaf shape is a useful feature but it is not always reliable. A study at Kew in the 1960s concluded that the best way to separate them is to look at the hairs on the calyx under a high-powered microscope (x400): those of red hemp-nettle are white with dense papillae, whereas those of broad-leaved hemp-nettle are smooth and translucent. Sometimes red hemp-nettle is considered just a subspecies, but at present it enjoys the rank of a full species.

The genus Galeopsis was named by Linnaeus in Species Plantarum in 1753, although he did not separate G. angustifolia from G. ladanum. The word '"galeopsis" is sometimes said to come from the Ancient Greek γαλέη (galê), meaning weasel, and ὄψις (opsis), appearance or resemblance, but it is perhaps more likely to have mixed Latin/Greek origin, as "galea" is the Latin for helmet. The specific epithet, coined some years later by Jakob Friedrich Ehrhart, simply means "narrow-leaved".

There are no known hybrids between red hemp-nettle and any other species and there are no currently accepted subspecies.

Its chromosome number is 2n = 16.

== Distribution and status ==
Red hemp-nettle is a western European plant, expanding its range in recent years into eastern European countries such as Hungary and Ukraine, where it is considered a kenophyte (recent introduction) in man-made habitats such as railway lines. It is classified as native in rocky mountain areas in Poland but a recent introduction elsewhere. The core of its native range is from the Alps to the Pyrenees, where it is native on montane screes.

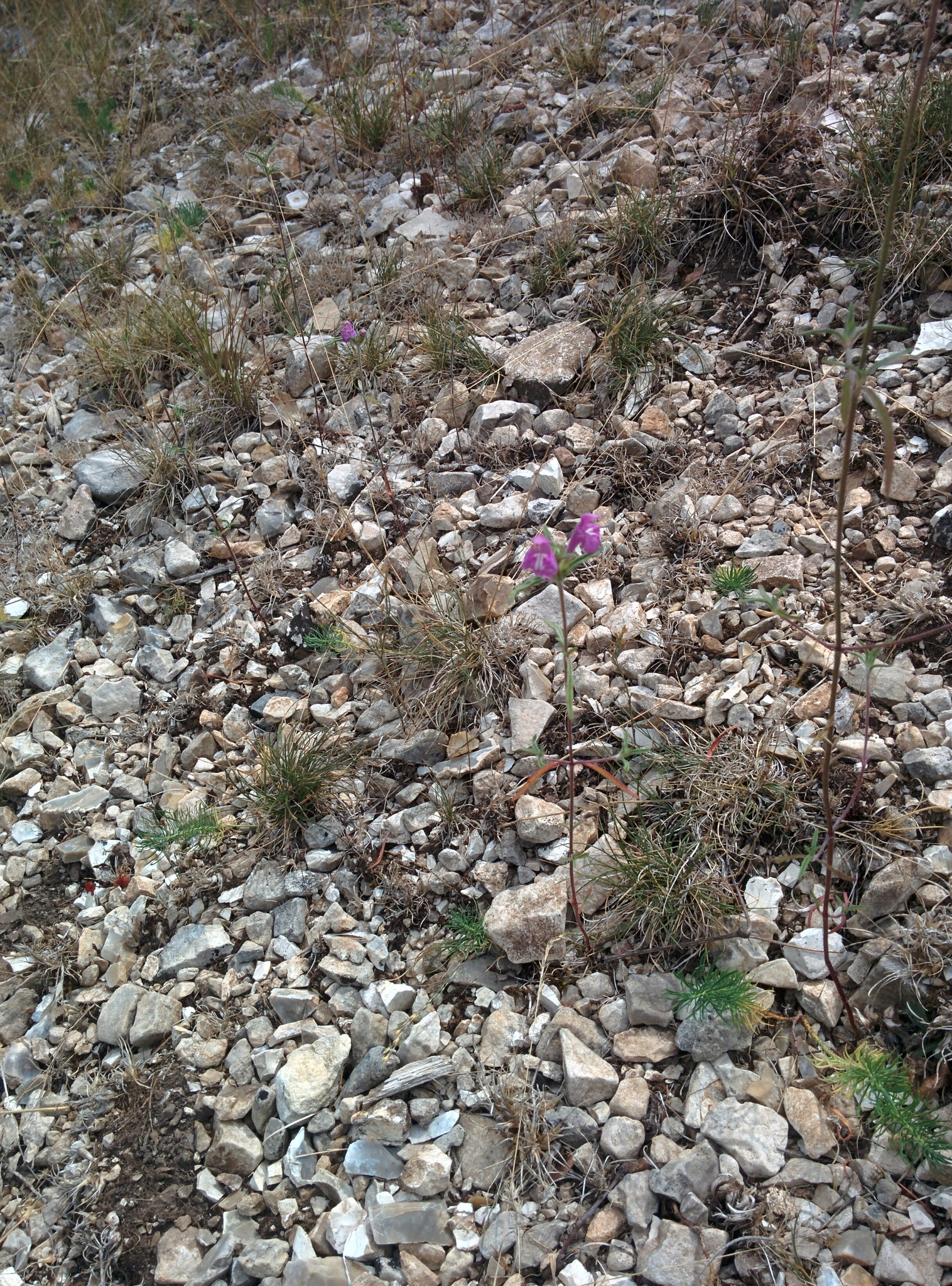
Red Hemp-nettle habitat in Provence-Alpes-Côte d'Azur, France

The first botanical record of red hemp-nettle in Britain was by Thomas Johnson in 1629, beside the road from Gravesend to Rochester. It was listed (as Ladanum segetum Lugd.) amongst arable weeds, which was its most common habitat in the country. It has, however, also been recorded many times in natural habitats such as coastal shingle at Dungeness and Pegwell Bay and limestone scree at St Vincent's Rocks. It is not possible to tell whether it spread from the wild habitats to the arable ones, and is therefore a native plant, or vice versa, which would make it an archaeophyte; although the consensus amongst botanists has generally been the latter.

Although its global threat status has not been evaluated by the IUCN, some countries give it a high conservation classification because it has declined on farmland in the last century or so. Britain, for example, considers it CR, which suggests a high risk of extinction in the wild, although there is no evidence that it has changed much in its more natural sites. It is considered an axiophyte of traditional farmland or of semi-natural habitat in several English counties.

== Habitat and ecology ==
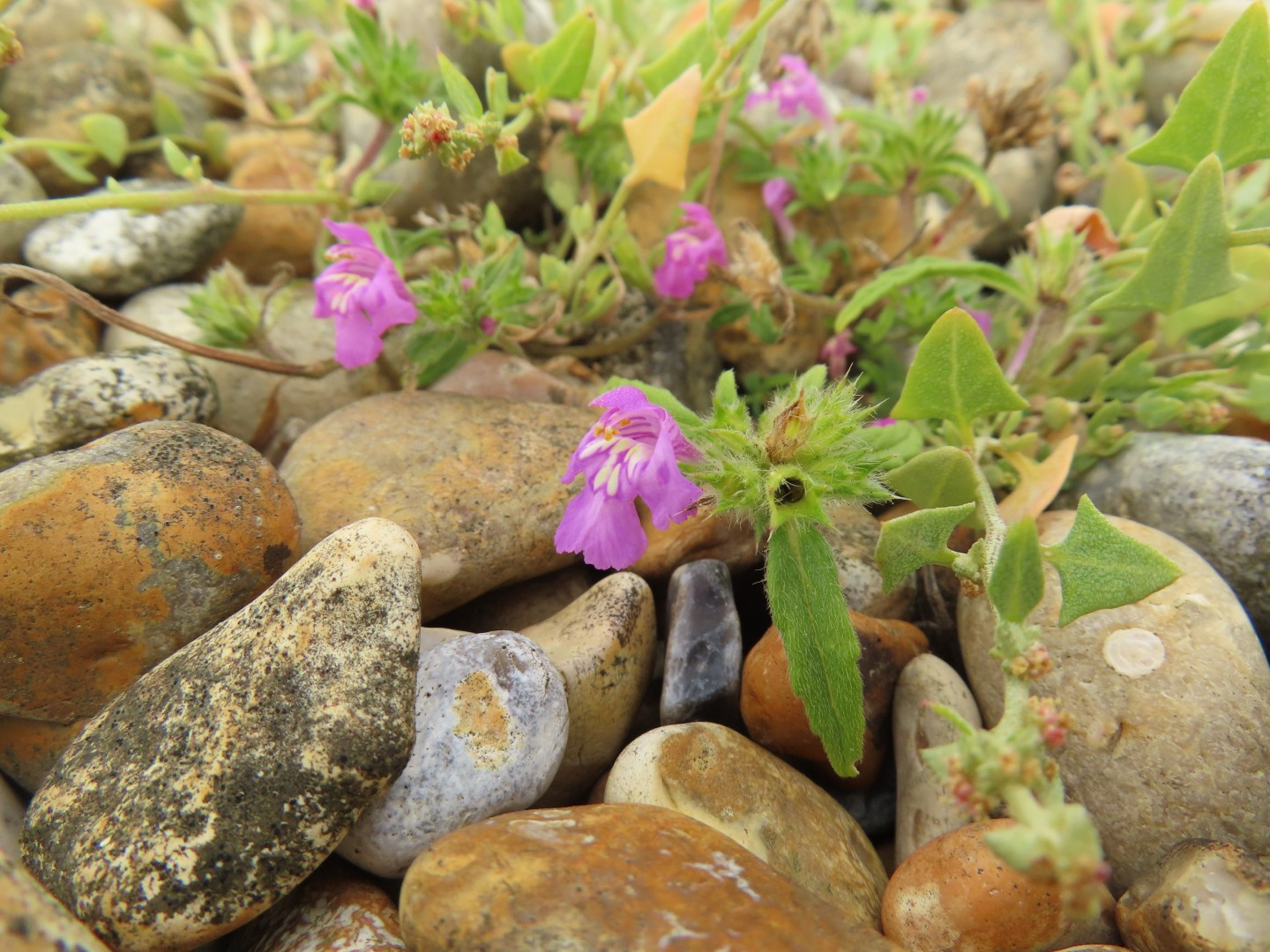
Red hemp-nettle on a shingle beach at Dungeness, Kent

The native habitat of this species is on various types of rather bare substrate, including limestone scree and coastal shingle. This made it perfectly adapted to arable fields, where it was common until it was largely eradicated by modern farming techniques. It is now found mostly in montane regions, on the coast, or as a casual on disturbed ground, along railways and in quarries.

Its Ellenberg-type indicator values in Britain are L = 8, F = 2, R = 8, N = 4, and S = 0, which show that it favours sunny situations with dry, slightly base-rich soils and low fertility, but does not tolerate salt. The values it has been assigned in Europe are very similar, L = 8, F = 2, R = 7, N = 3, and S = 0, but slightly less calcareous and less fertile.

Because it often grows on almost bare ground or loose limestone chippings, it is sometimes difficult to describe its vegetation community. When growing in natural limestone scree, as on Moelydd in Shropshire, for example, it is a component of CG2 grassland. At Dungeness it is found in SD1 shingle vegetation where there is frequent disturbance to the substrate.

Red hemp-nettle is a food plant for several species of invertebrates, including:

- Lamiogethes pedicularius and L. serripes, beetles which are monophagous on the flowers of Galeopsis;
- Chrysolina fastuosa, the deadnettle leaf beetle, which feeds on the leaves of this and many other species;
- Dibolia cynoglossi, a leaf beetle which is common throughout Europe;
- Cryptomyzus galeopsidis, the European blackcurrant aphid, which is also common;
- the flies Liriomyza eupatorii, which is a leaf miner, Napomyza lateralis, a stem borer, and Ophiomyia labiatarum, which mines the stems;
- and a root nematode, Ditylenchus dipsaci.

The fungi which are known to infest red hemp-nettle are the powdery mildew Neoërysiphe galeopsidis and the leaf-spot fungus Septoria galeopsidis.
