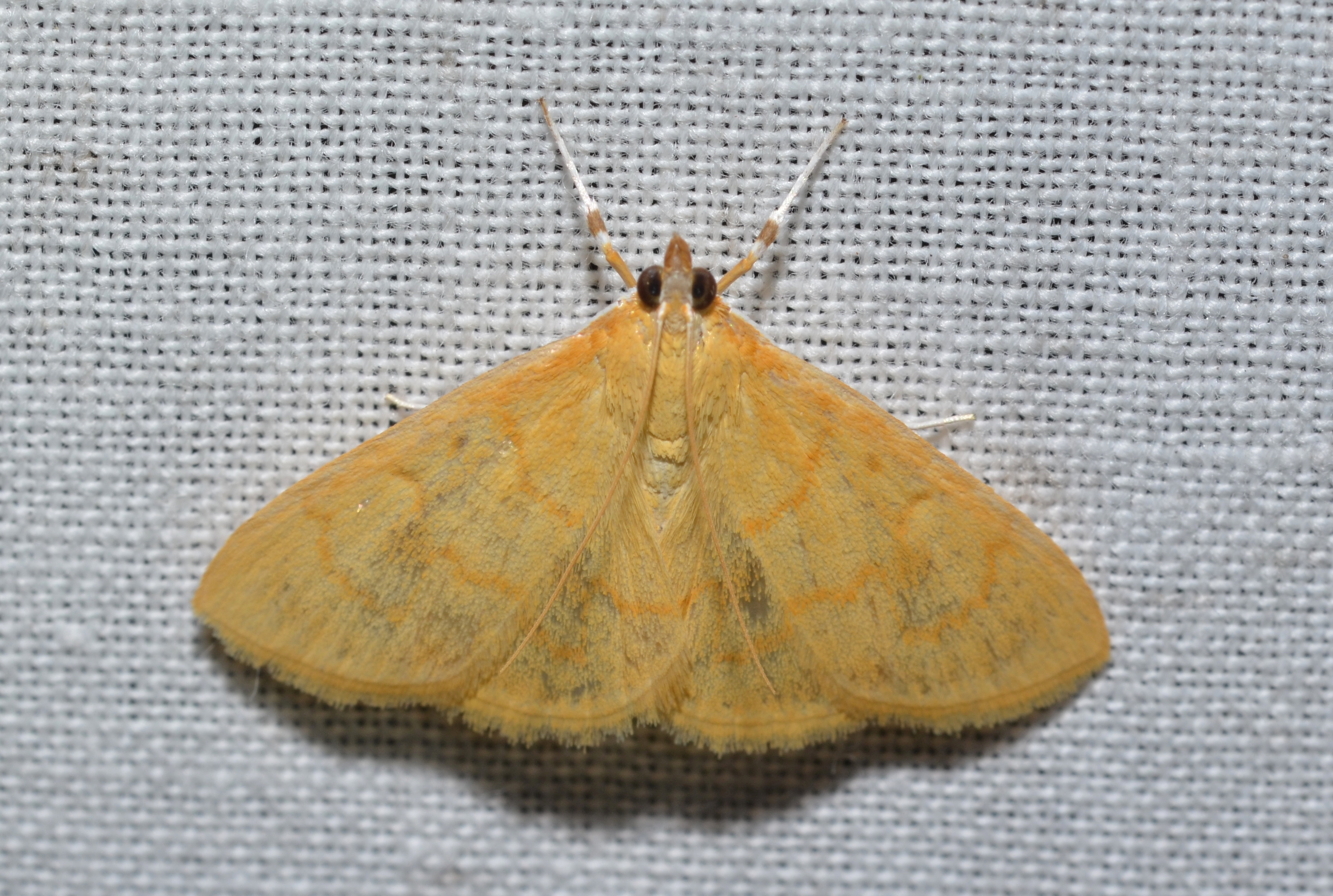
- Ecpyrrhorrhoe puralis

Scientific classification
- Domain: Eukaryota
- Kingdom: Animalia
- Phylum: Arthropoda
- Class: Insecta
- Order: Lepidoptera
- Family: Crambidae
- Genus: Ecpyrrhorrhoe
- Species: E. puralis

Binomial name
- Ecpyrrhorrhoe puralis (South in Leech & South, 1901)

Synonyms
- Pionea puralis South in Leech & South, 1901

= Ecpyrrhorrhoe puralis =

Species of moth

Ecpyrrhorrhoe puralis is a moth in the family Crambidae. It was described by South in 1901. It is found in China (Hubei). It is an introduced species in the eastern United States, where it has been recorded from Alabama, Georgia, Kentucky, Maryland, Mississippi, North Carolina, Pennsylvania, South Carolina, Tennessee and West Virginia.

The wingspan is about 25 mm. Adults have been recorded on wing from April to September in North America.

The larvae feed on Paulownia tomentosa.
