= Ecpyrrhorrhoe dissimilis =

Scientific classification
- Domain: Eukaryota
- Kingdom: Animalia
- Phylum: Arthropoda
- Class: Insecta
- Order: Lepidoptera
- Family: Crambidae
- Genus: Ecpyrrhorrhoe
- Species: E. dissimilis

Binomial name
- Ecpyrrhorrhoe dissimilis (Yamanaka, 1958)

Synonyms
- Pyrausta dissimilis Yamanaka, 1958; Yezobotys ainualis Munroe & Mutuura, 1969

Species of moth

Ecpyrrhorrhoe dissimilis is a moth in the family Crambidae. It was described by Hiroshi Yamanaka in 1958. It is found in Japan.
