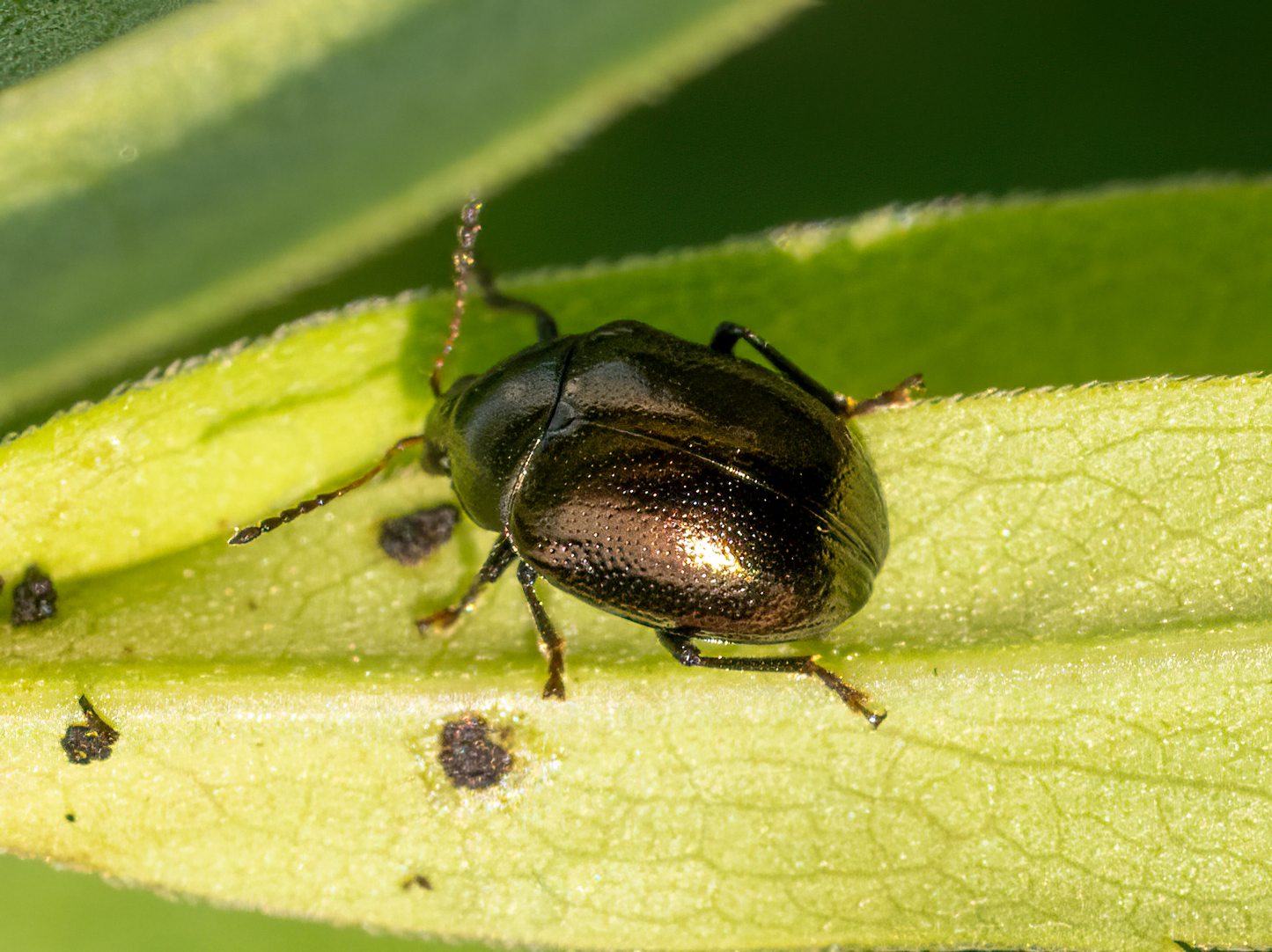

Scientific classification
- Kingdom: Animalia
- Phylum: Arthropoda
- Class: Insecta
- Order: Coleoptera
- Suborder: Polyphaga
- Infraorder: Cucujiformia
- Family: Chrysomelidae
- Tribe: Alticini
- Genus: Dibolia
- Species: D. borealis

Binomial name
- Dibolia borealis Chevrolat in Guérin-Méneville, 1834

= Dibolia borealis =

Species of beetle

Dibolia borealis, the northern plantain flea beetle, is a species of flea beetle in the family Chrysomelidae. It is found in North America.
