= Ecpyrrhorrhoe celatalis =

Scientific classification
- Kingdom: Animalia
- Phylum: Arthropoda
- Class: Insecta
- Order: Lepidoptera
- Family: Crambidae
- Genus: Ecpyrrhorrhoe
- Species: E. celatalis

Binomial name
- Ecpyrrhorrhoe celatalis (Walker, 1859)

Synonyms
- Botys celatalis Walker, 1859

Species of moth

Ecpyrrhorrhoe celatalis is a moth in the family Crambidae. It was described by Francis Walker in 1859. It is found in Sri Lanka.
