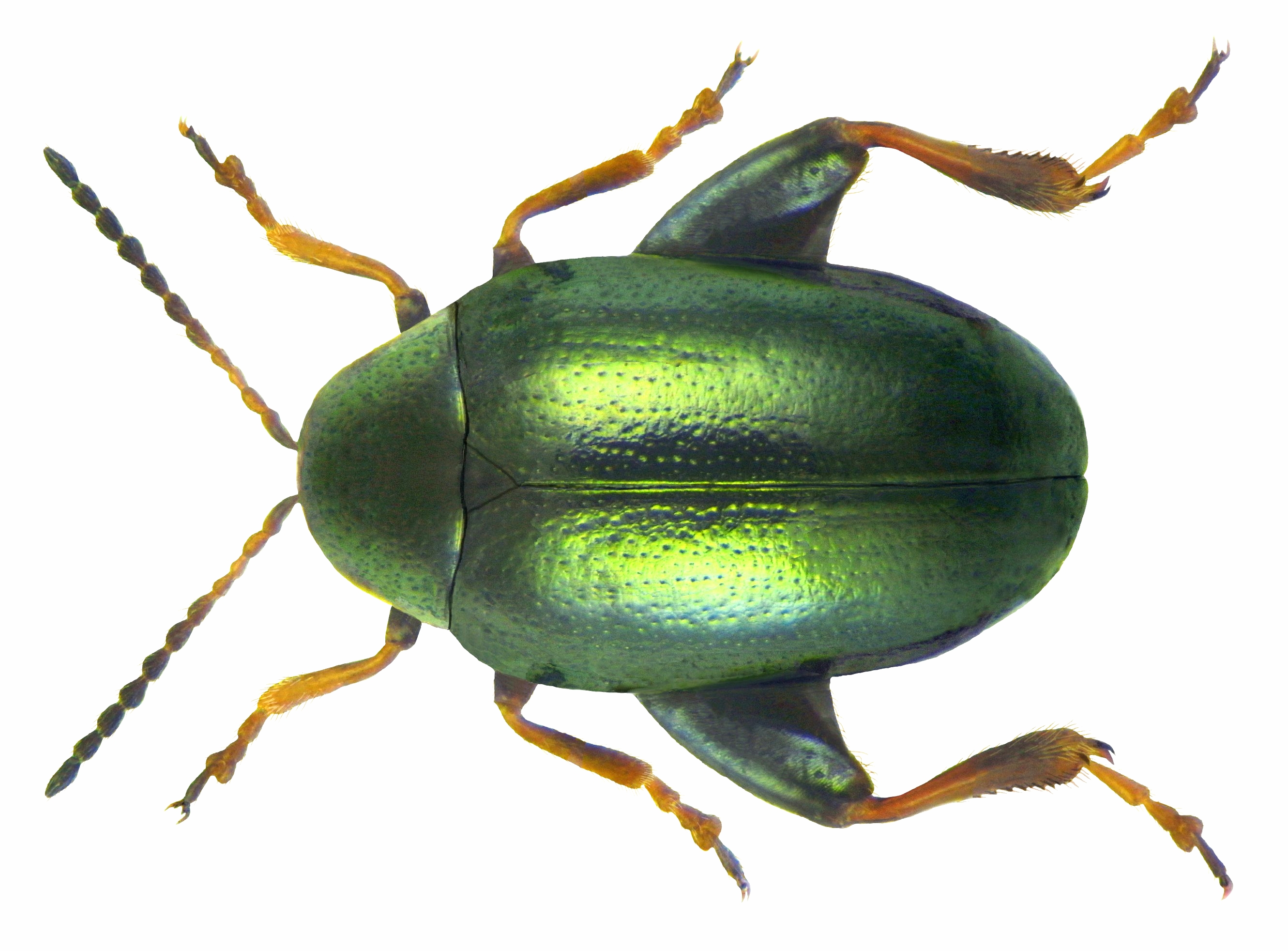
- Dibolia cynoglossi

Scientific classification
- Domain: Eukaryota
- Kingdom: Animalia
- Phylum: Arthropoda
- Class: Insecta
- Order: Coleoptera
- Suborder: Polyphaga
- Infraorder: Cucujiformia
- Family: Chrysomelidae
- Tribe: Alticini
- Genus: Dibolia; Latreille, 1829

= Dibolia =

Genus of beetles

Dibolia is a genus of flea beetles in the family Chrysomelidae. There are some 60 described species worldwide.

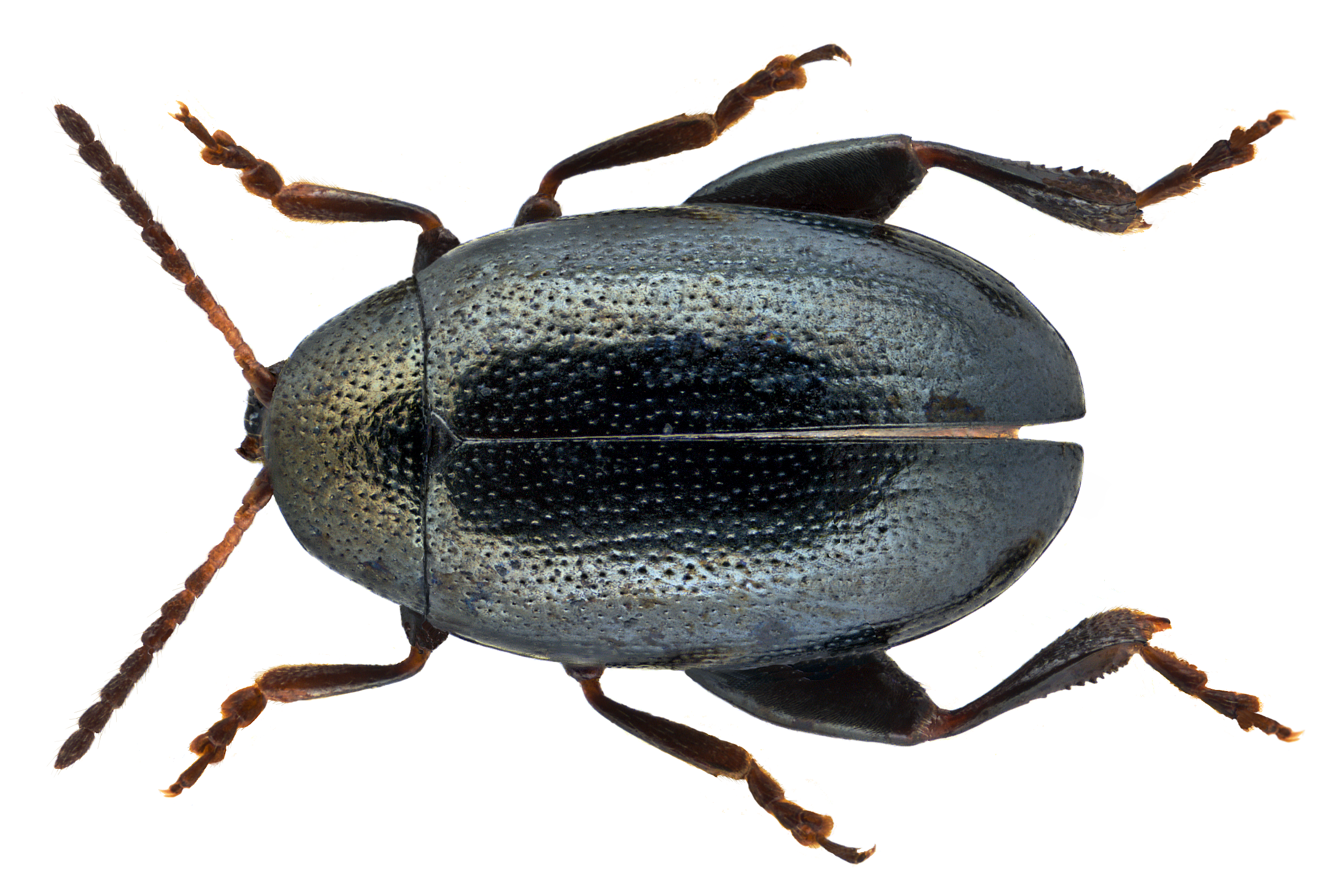
Dibolia occultans

== Selected species ==
- Dibolia alpestris Mohr, 1981^{g}
- Dibolia borealis Chevrolat in Guérin-Méneville, 1834^{i c g b} (northern plantain flea beetle)
- Dibolia californica Parry, 1974^{i c g}
- Dibolia carpathica Weise, 1893^{g}
- Dibolia catherinia Mignot, 1971^{i c g}
- Dibolia championi Jacoby, 1885^{i c g}
- Dibolia chelones Parry, 1974^{i c g b}
- Dibolia chevrolati Allard, 1861^{g}
- Dibolia cryptocephala (Koch, 1803)^{g}
- Dibolia cynoglossi (Koch, 1803)^{g}
- Dibolia depressiuscula Letzner, 1846^{g}
- Dibolia dogueti Mohr, 1981^{g}
- Dibolia femoralis L.Redtenbacher, 1849^{g}
- Dibolia foersteri Bach, 1859^{g}
- Dibolia kansana Parry, 1974^{i c g}
- Dibolia libonoti Horn, 1889^{i c g}
- Dibolia magnifica Har.Lindberg, 1950^{g}
- Dibolia maura Allard, 1860^{g}
- Dibolia melampyri Parry, 1974^{g}
- Dibolia melanpyri Parry, 1974^{i c g}
- Dibolia obscura Parry, 1974^{i c g}
- Dibolia obtusa Wollaston, 1864^{g}
- Dibolia occultans (Koch, 1803)^{g}
- Dibolia ovata J. L. LeConte, 1859^{i c g}
- Dibolia pelleti Allard, 1860^{g}
- Dibolia penstemonis Parry, 1974^{i c g}
- Dibolia peyerimhoffi Doguet^{g}
- Dibolia phoenicia Allard, 1866^{g}
- Dibolia reyheria Mignot, 1971^{i c g}
- Dibolia rufofemorata Reitter, 1896^{g}
- Dibolia rugulosa L.Redtenbacher, 1849^{g}
- Dibolia russica Weise, 1893^{g}
- Dibolia schillingii (Letzner, 1847)^{g}
- Dibolia sinuata Horn, 1889^{i c g}
- Dibolia timida (Illiger, 1794)^{g}
- Dibolia tyrrhenica Mohr, 1981^{g}
- Dibolia veyreti Doguet, 1975^{g}

Data sources: i = ITIS, c = Catalogue of Life, g = GBIF, b = Bugguide.net
