= Ecpyrrhorrhoe ruidispinalis =

Scientific classification
- Domain: Eukaryota
- Kingdom: Animalia
- Phylum: Arthropoda
- Class: Insecta
- Order: Lepidoptera
- Family: Crambidae
- Genus: Ecpyrrhorrhoe
- Species: E. ruidispinalis

Binomial name
- Ecpyrrhorrhoe ruidispinalis Zhang, Li & Wang, 2004

Species of moth

Ecpyrrhorrhoe ruidispinalis is a moth in the family Crambidae. It was described by Zhang, Li and Wang in 2004. It is found in China (Guanxi).
