= Ecpyrrhorrhoe angustivalvaris =

Scientific classification
- Domain: Eukaryota
- Kingdom: Animalia
- Phylum: Arthropoda
- Class: Insecta
- Order: Lepidoptera
- Family: Crambidae
- Genus: Ecpyrrhorrhoe
- Species: E. angustivalvaris

Binomial name
- Ecpyrrhorrhoe angustivalvaris Gao, Zhang & Wang, 2013

Species of moth

Ecpyrrhorrhoe angustivalvaris is a moth in the family Crambidae. It was described by Qiang Gao, Dan-Dan Zhang and Shu-Xia Wang in 2013. It is found in Guizhou, China.
