= Ecpyrrhorrhoe diffusalis =

Scientific classification
- Kingdom: Animalia
- Phylum: Arthropoda
- Class: Insecta
- Order: Lepidoptera
- Family: Crambidae
- Genus: Ecpyrrhorrhoe
- Species: E. diffusalis

Binomial name
- Ecpyrrhorrhoe diffusalis (Guenée, 1854)

Synonyms
- Botys diffusalis Guenee, 1854; Botys carnealis Duponchel, 1831; Botys affusalis Guenée, 1854; Botys tenuialis Mann, 1862

Species of moth

Ecpyrrhorrhoe diffusalis is a species of moth in the family Crambidae. It is found in France, Spain, Switzerland, Italy, on the Balkan Peninsula and in Turkey.

The wingspan is about 22 mm.
