= Fecal shield =

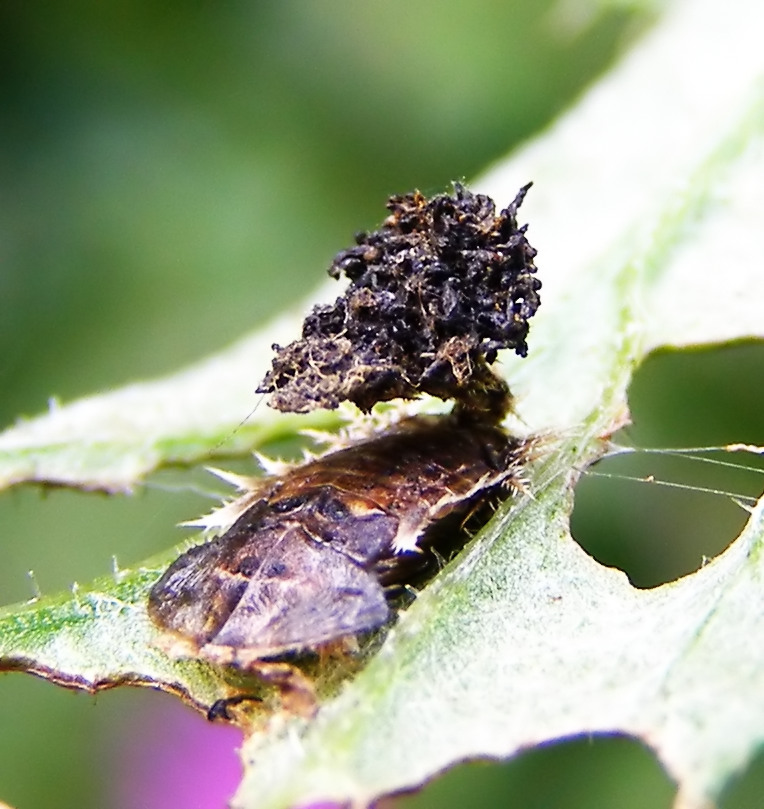
Cassida viridis larva with fecal shield

The fecal shield is a structure formed by the larvae of many species of beetles in the leaf beetle family, Chrysomelidae. It is composed of the frass of the insect and often its exuviae, or bits of shed exoskeleton. The beetle may carry the shield on its back or wield it upon its posterior end. The main function of the fecal shield is defense against predators. Other terms for the fecal shield noted in the literature include "larval clothing", "kotanhang" ("fecal appendage"), "faecal mask", "faecal pad", and "exuvio-faecal annex".

== Ecology ==
Beetle larvae of the chrysomelid subfamilies Criocerinae and Galerucinae retain their feces in piles on their backs, regularly adding material as feces slips off. The shields of Cassidinae larvae are generally mobile. They are built on paired caudal processes (also called urogomphi) to the posterior end of the body; these processes move the shield over the body like an umbrella. These shields may be raised and even swung to strike a predator.

Cassida cf rubiginosa larva constructing the shield

When the shield is carried on the tip of the abdomen, it is secured to a double-lobed, spine-like process called the caudal furca, which is also known as the "anal fork". The larva constructs the shield by maneuvering its "muscular telescopic and highly protrusible anus", or "anal turret", which is positioned dorsally, on the back. It excretes an amount of feces, sometimes with a droplet of gluey secretion, and places it on the caudal furca using its anal turret. In the species Hemisphaerota cyanea, the larva constructs a shield which may be more descriptively called a "fecal thatch", because it is woven from narrow, coiled strands of frass. The larva begins feeding immediately upon emergence from the egg and within minutes it produces its first fecal strand. Within twelve hours, its thatch-shield is full-sized. The larva diligently repairs the shield with replacement strands when it is broken.

The fecal shield takes many forms across species. In some, it covers the entire body, while in others it is narrower. In some, it is simply a "clump". In consistency it may be hard or rather "pasty". In some species of the subfamily Chrysomelinae, the female adult coats each of her eggs with feces, and when the larva emerges, it uses this ready-made fecal casing as the base of its shield, adding to it as it grows. These casings tend to be quite hard, and have been compared to adobe. Most fecal shields are bound with exuviae, the "skins" shed from the insect when it molts. Some shields, such as that of Cassida stigmatica, are entirely frass-free, made only of exuviae.

== Function ==
The fecal shield is not just a physical barrier, but also a chemical one. When a larva feeds on a plant, it ingests secondary metabolites in the plant tissues, such as alkaloids, saponins, and phytol derivatives, and these are present in its feces. These chemicals can be a potent defense against predatory insects. For example, the larva of the tortoise beetle Plagiometriona clavata obtains chemical compounds from its diet of bittersweet (Solanum dulcamara), excretes them, and incorporates them into its shield, where they repel the predatory ant Formica subsericea.

The fecal shield is beneficial, but it is not without its cost to the insect. Though it is made of waste products, the larva must exert energy simply to transport its weight. A fecal shield can weigh half as much as the larva itself. This energy might otherwise go into development. The shield is also a problem for the larva when it has the opposite effect: its chemistry attracts predators instead of repelling them. Experiments with several larvae of genus Cassida that feed on volatile-rich tansy show that their shields attract the predatory ant Myrmica rubra.

Another possible function of the fecal shield may include protection of the larva from environmental conditions such as ultraviolet radiation, desiccation, wind, and rain.

== See also ==
Camptosomata

Other leaf beetle larvae build a case made of waste materials. Examples are: Exema and Neochlamisus.
