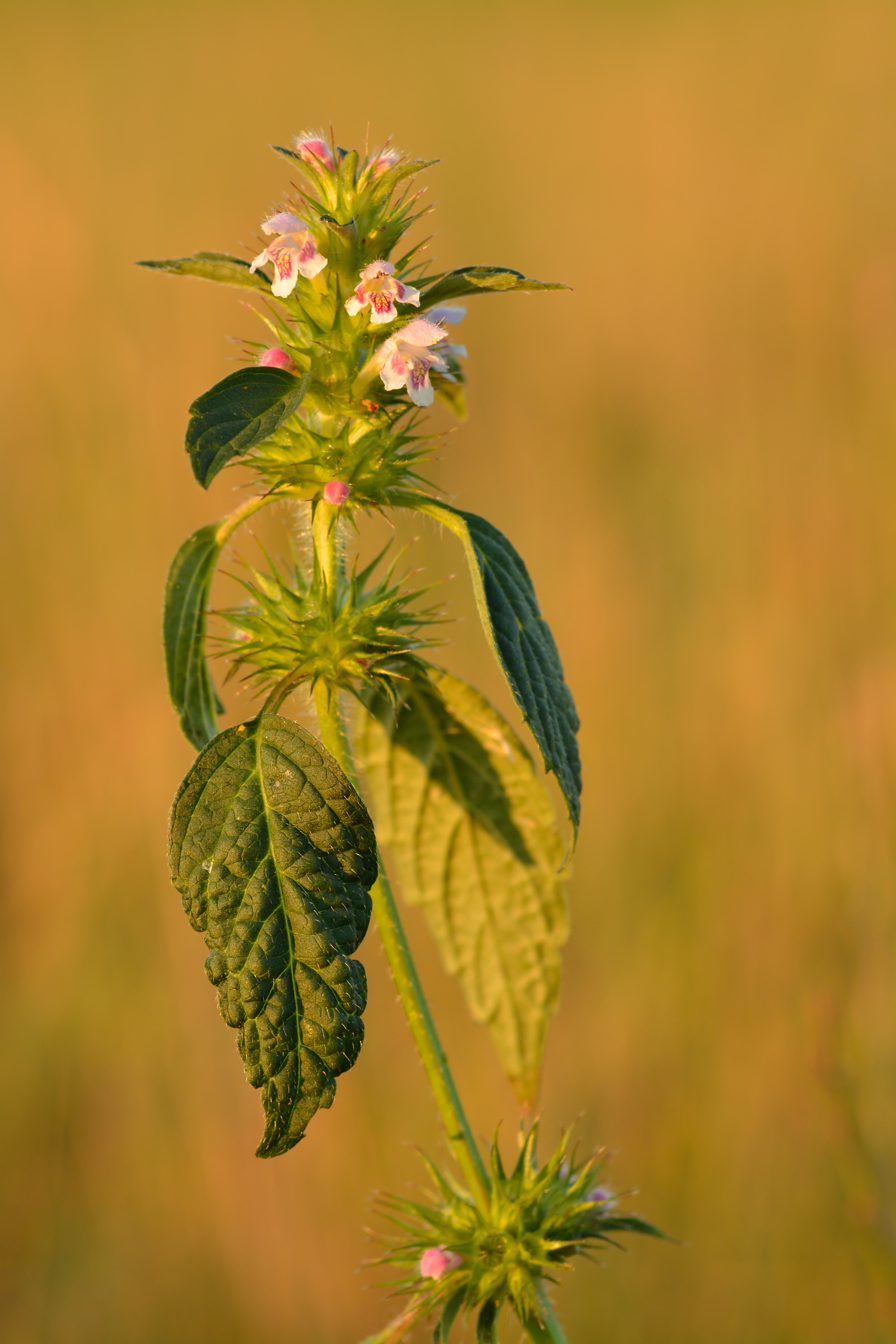
- Galeopsis tetrahit, common hemp-nettle

Scientific classification
- Kingdom: Plantae
- Clade: Tracheophytes
- Clade: Angiosperms
- Clade: Eudicots
- Clade: Asterids
- Order: Lamiales
- Family: Lamiaceae
- Subfamily: Lamioideae
- Genus: Galeopsis; L.

Synonyms
- Tetrahit Adans.; Ladanum Gilib.; Tetraith Bubani; Dalanum Dostál; Ladanella Pouzar & Slavíková

= Galeopsis =

Genus of plants

Galeopsis is a genus of annual herbaceous plants native to Europe and Asia. Members of this genus often have common names ending in hemp-nettle or hempnettle. Some species are naturalized in North America and New Zealand.

The plants are poisonous. Several species are widespread weeds and some are used as medicinal herbs.

== Species ==
Species include:

- Galeopsis angustifolia Ehrh. ex Hoffm.
- Galeopsis bifida Boenn. – bifid hemp-nettle, split-lip hemp-nettle, splitlip hempnettle, common hemp-nettle, and large-flowered hemp-nettle - widespread across much of Europe and Asia; naturalized in North America
- Galeopsis ladanum L. - widespread across much of Europe and Asia; naturalized in scattered sites in North America
- Galeopsis nana Otsch. - Caucasus (Georgia, Armenia, Azerbaijan)
- Galeopsis pubescens Besser – hairy or downy hempnettle - southern & central Europe from Britain and France east to Russia
- Galeopsis pyrenaica Bartl. - Pyrenees Mountains of Spain & France
- Galeopsis reuteri Rchb.f. - Alps of France & Italy
- Galeopsis segetum Neck. – downy hemp-nettle - Britain, Denmark, Netherlands, Belgium, France, Spain, Germany, Italy, Switzerland, Yugoslavia
- Galeopsis speciosa Mill. – large-flowered hemp-nettle, Edmonton hempnettle - northern & central Europe, Siberia; naturalized in Canada
- Galeopsis tetrahit L. – common hemp-nettle, brittlestem hempnettle - southern & central Europe from Portugal to Russia; naturalized in New Zealand and North America
