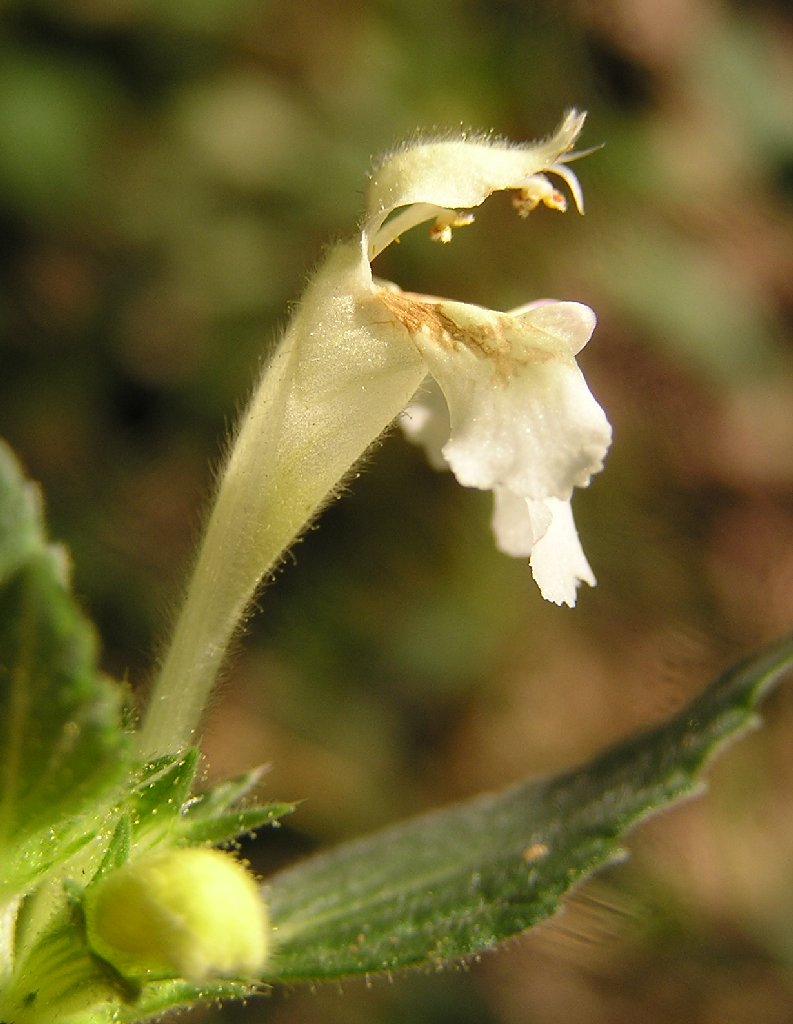

Conservation status
- Data Deficient (IUCN 3.1)

Scientific classification
- Kingdom: Plantae
- Clade: Tracheophytes
- Clade: Angiosperms
- Clade: Eudicots
- Clade: Asterids
- Order: Lamiales
- Family: Lamiaceae
- Genus: Galeopsis
- Species: G. segetum

Binomial name
- Galeopsis segetum Neck. 1770

= Galeopsis segetum =

Species of flowering plant

Galeopsis segetum, commonly known as downy hemp-nettle, is a species of flowering plant in the sage family, Lamiaceae. It grows as a weed in arable ground throughout Europe. Although superficially resembling the stinging nettle it is of a different family and does not sting.
