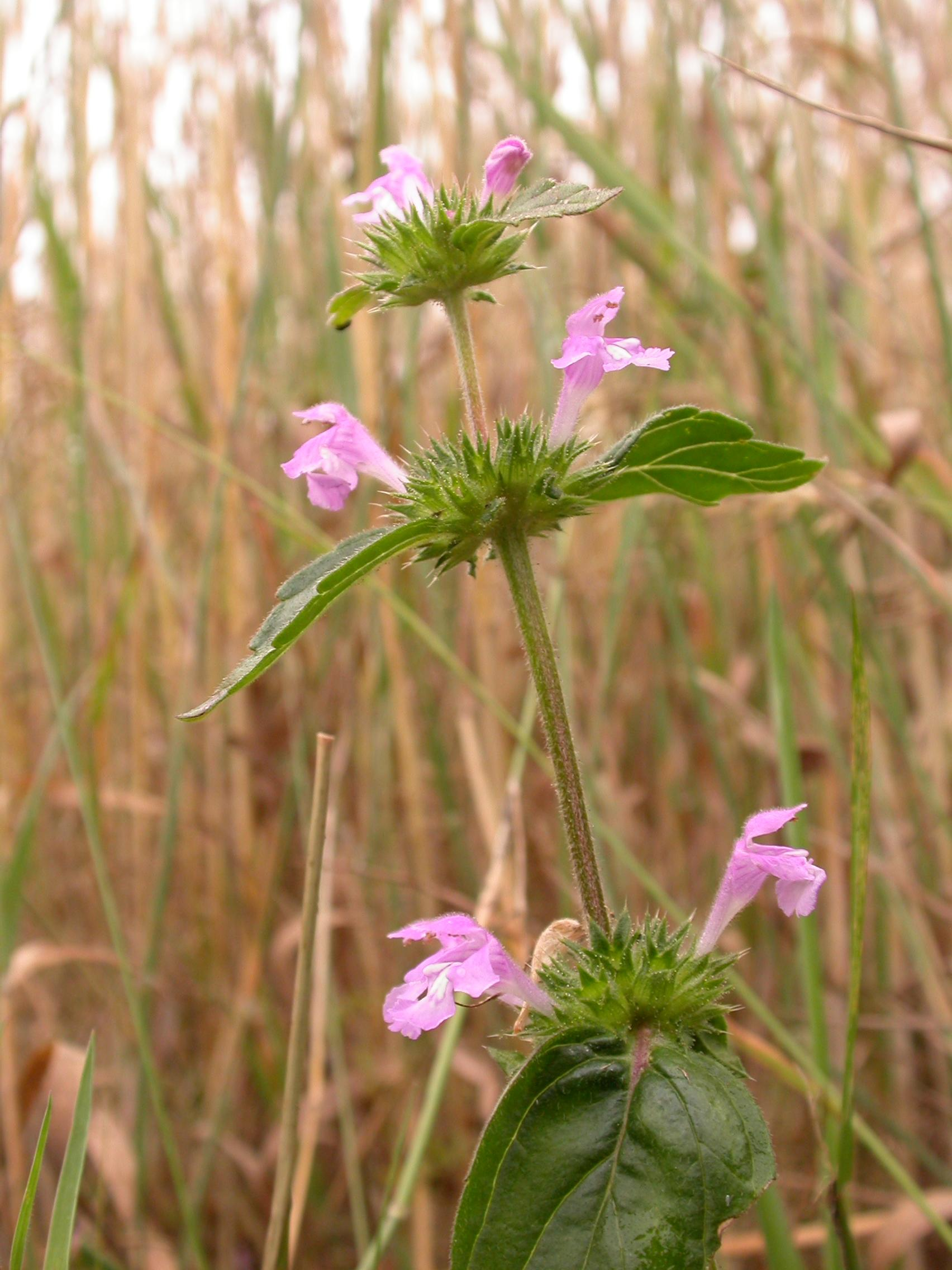

Scientific classification
- Kingdom: Plantae
- Clade: Tracheophytes
- Clade: Angiosperms
- Clade: Eudicots
- Clade: Asterids
- Order: Lamiales
- Family: Lamiaceae
- Genus: Galeopsis
- Species: G. ladanum

Binomial name
- Galeopsis ladanum L.

Subspecies
- G. ladanum subsp. carpetana (Willk.) O.Bolòs & Vigo; G. ladanum subsp. ladanum

Synonyms
- List: Dalanum ladanum (L.) Dostál; Galeopsis ladanum subsp. angustifolia Ehrh.; Ladanella ladanum (L.) Pouzar & Slavíková; Lamium ladanum (L.) Crantz; Tetrahit ladanum (L.) Moench

= Galeopsis ladanum =

Plant species in the mint family

Galeopsis ladanum is a species of flowering plant belonging to the family Lamiaceae.

Its native range is Europe to Central Asia.
