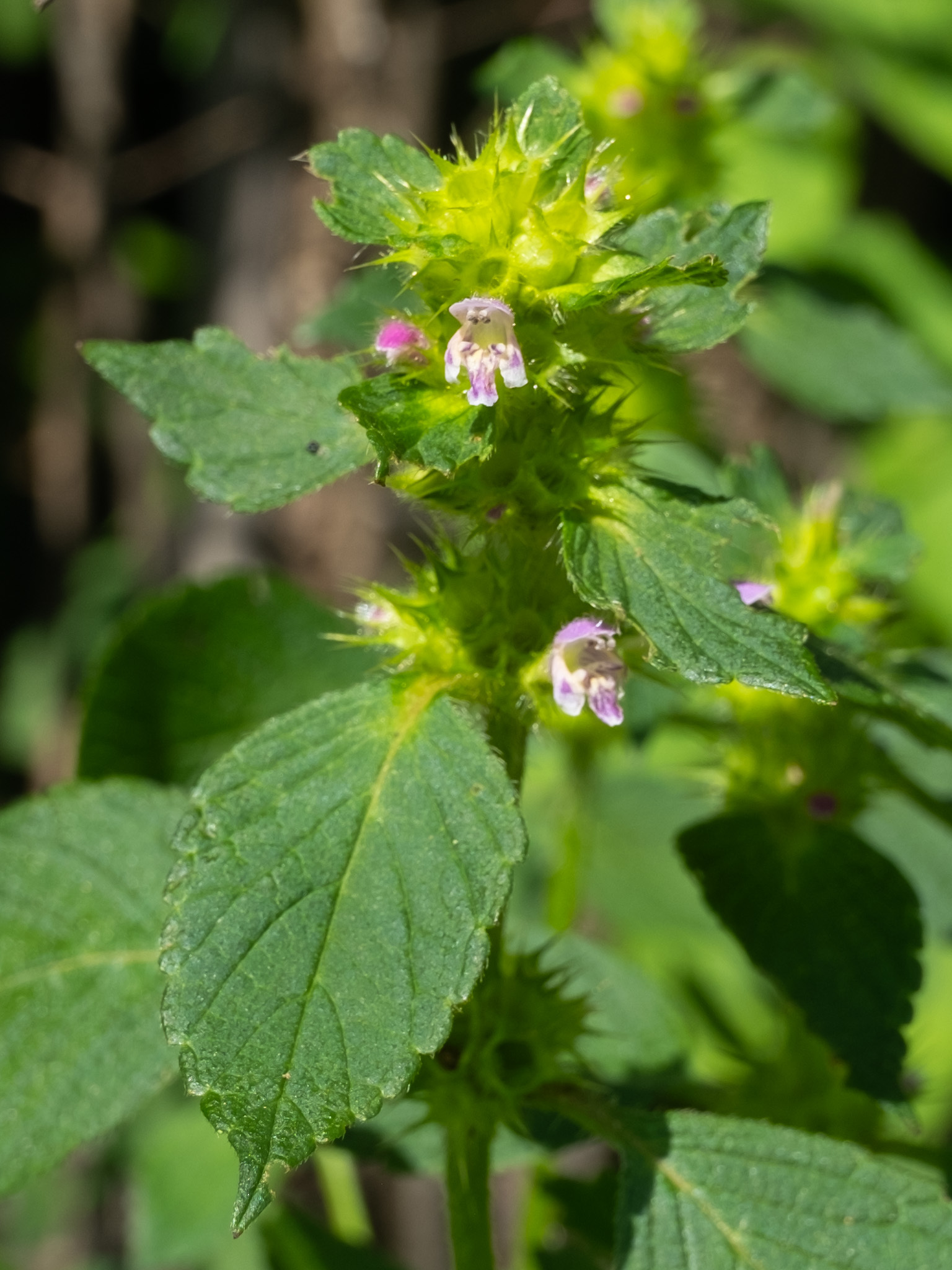

Scientific classification
- Kingdom: Plantae
- Clade: Tracheophytes
- Clade: Angiosperms
- Clade: Eudicots
- Clade: Asterids
- Order: Lamiales
- Family: Lamiaceae
- Genus: Galeopsis
- Species: G. bifida

Binomial name
- Galeopsis bifida Boenn.

Synonyms
- List: Galeopsis bifida var. emarginata Nakai; Galeopsis bifida var. pernhofferi (Wettst.) Gams; Galeopsis pallens Briq.; Galeopsis pernhofferi Wettst.; Galeopsis tetrahit var. bifida (Boenn.) Lej. & Courtois; Galeopsis tetrahit proles bifida (Boenn.) Rouy; Galeopsis tetrahit subsp. bifida (Boenn.) Fr.; Galeopsis tetrahit var. parviflora Benth.; Lamium artvinense Yıld.

= Galeopsis bifida =

Plant species in the mint family

Galeopsis bifida is an annual plant native to Europe and Asia but now found in Canada and the northeastern, midwestern parts of the United States. It has many common names such as bifid hemp-nettle, split-lip hemp-nettle, common hemp-nettle, and large-flowered hemp-nettle. The genus name means weasel-like, referring to the corolla of the flower. It is often confused with other species of Lamiaceae such as Mentha arvensis, Dracocephalum parviflorum and Stachys pilosa.

== Distribution ==
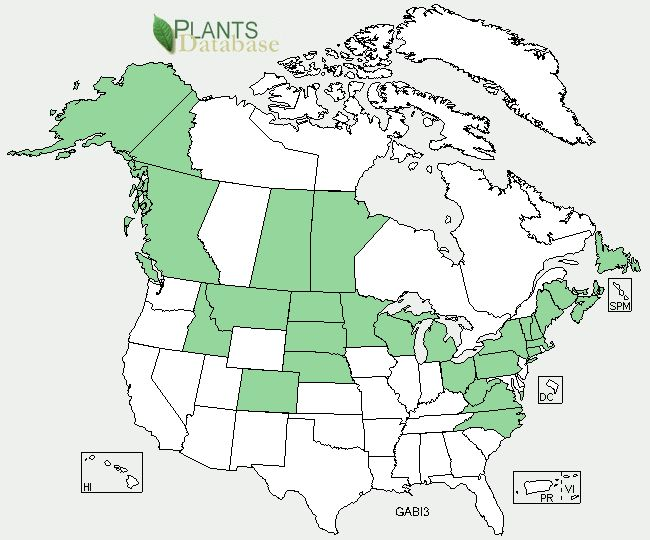
Distribution of Galeopsis bifida in the United States and Canada.

Galeopsis bifida is native to Europe and Asia. In the British Isles it is mainly found in Wales and Scotland. It occurs throughout Canada, the northeastern and midwestern parts of the United States, and has been introduced to Alaska. It was also introduced in some parts of New Zealand and the Canary Islands.

== Habitat and ecology ==
Hempnettle mostly grow in disturbed sites, roadsides, gardens, agricultural lands, wet heaths and sometimes in woods. It creates a dense mid-forb layer dominating the regular grass and low forbs. It utilizes limited nutrients and requires moist soil, usually prefers moderate levels of acid and basic soils.

== Morphology ==
Hempnettle could grow up to 1 meter high. Its leaves and flowers are hairy. Leaves are simple, 1 to 5 inches long, opposite, margins are serrate and ovate in shape, pubescent on both sides. The stem is swollen below the leaf nodes. Its flowers can be purple, white or pink and are terminal in axillary clusters.

== Flowers and fruit ==
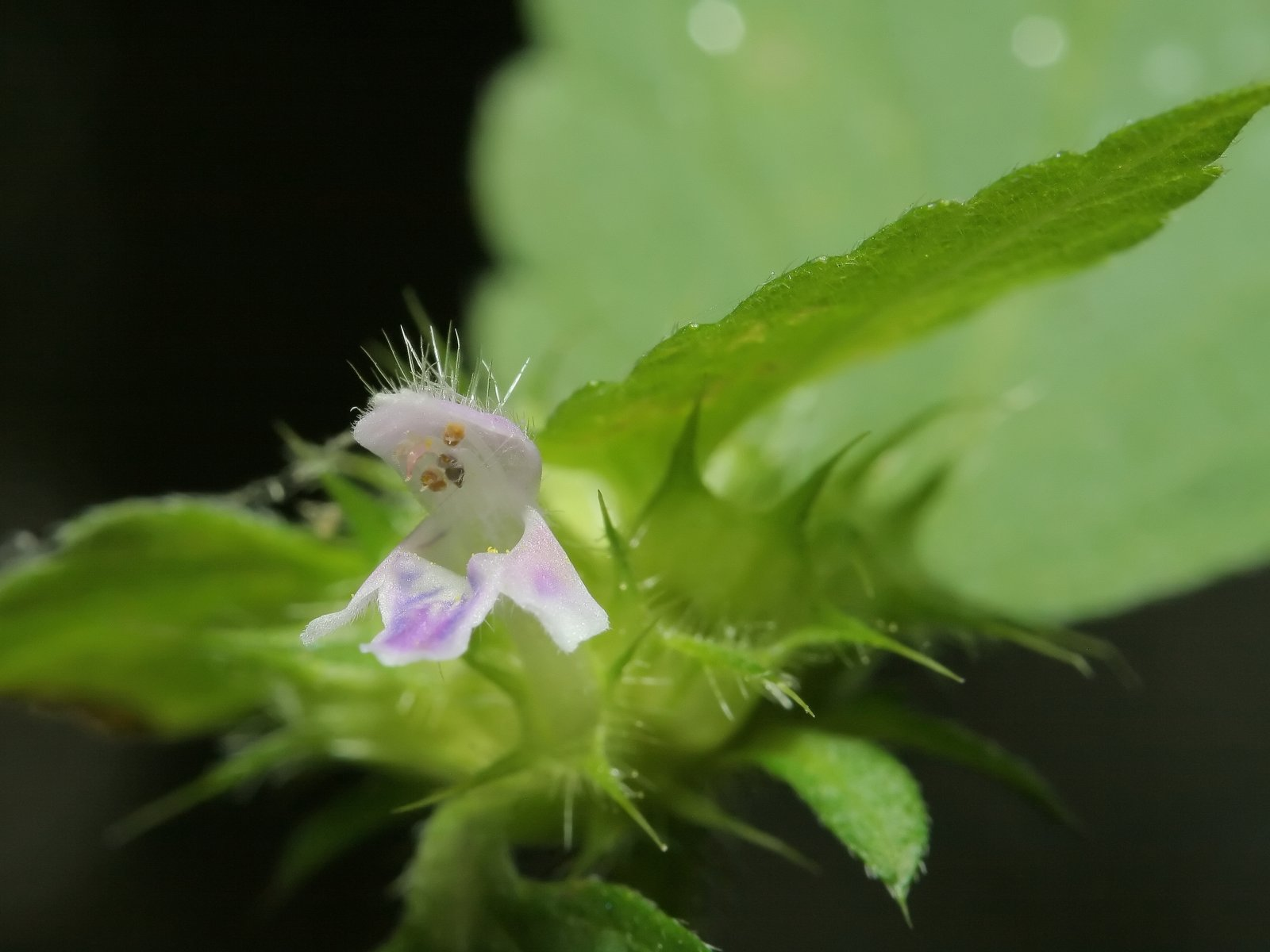
Structure of its flower

Like other Lamiaceae, its corolla is bilabiate meaning that it has two lips, an upper lip and a lower lip. The upper lip has one lobe and the lower lip has three lobes covered with hair on the lower side of the lobe. The flowers are bell shaped and bilaterally symmetrical, ranging in size from about one half to three fourths of an inch. The pistil consists of two fused carpels; its stigma is two-lobed. There are four stamens, two long and two short. Its style is solitary. Its flowering time is late summer to autumn. Its fruit is a schizocarp, brown in color. This plant is self-pollinated, each plant with a capacity of producing up to 2,800 seeds which can remain dormant under soil for several years. The seeds are large; dispersal is via mammal fur. Germination occurs when the seeds are brought near to the soil surface and it takes place within a month.

== Usage ==
Oil obtained from the seeds is used as a polish for leather.

== Edibility ==
The seeds of this plant are edible and have been found in large quantities in European archeological sites. A study done on the seeds show no toxicity in mice and high potential for bioavailable antioxidants to humans. According to Samuel Thayer, many people have eaten the leaves mistaking them for stinging nettle; they are not toxic but unpalatable.
