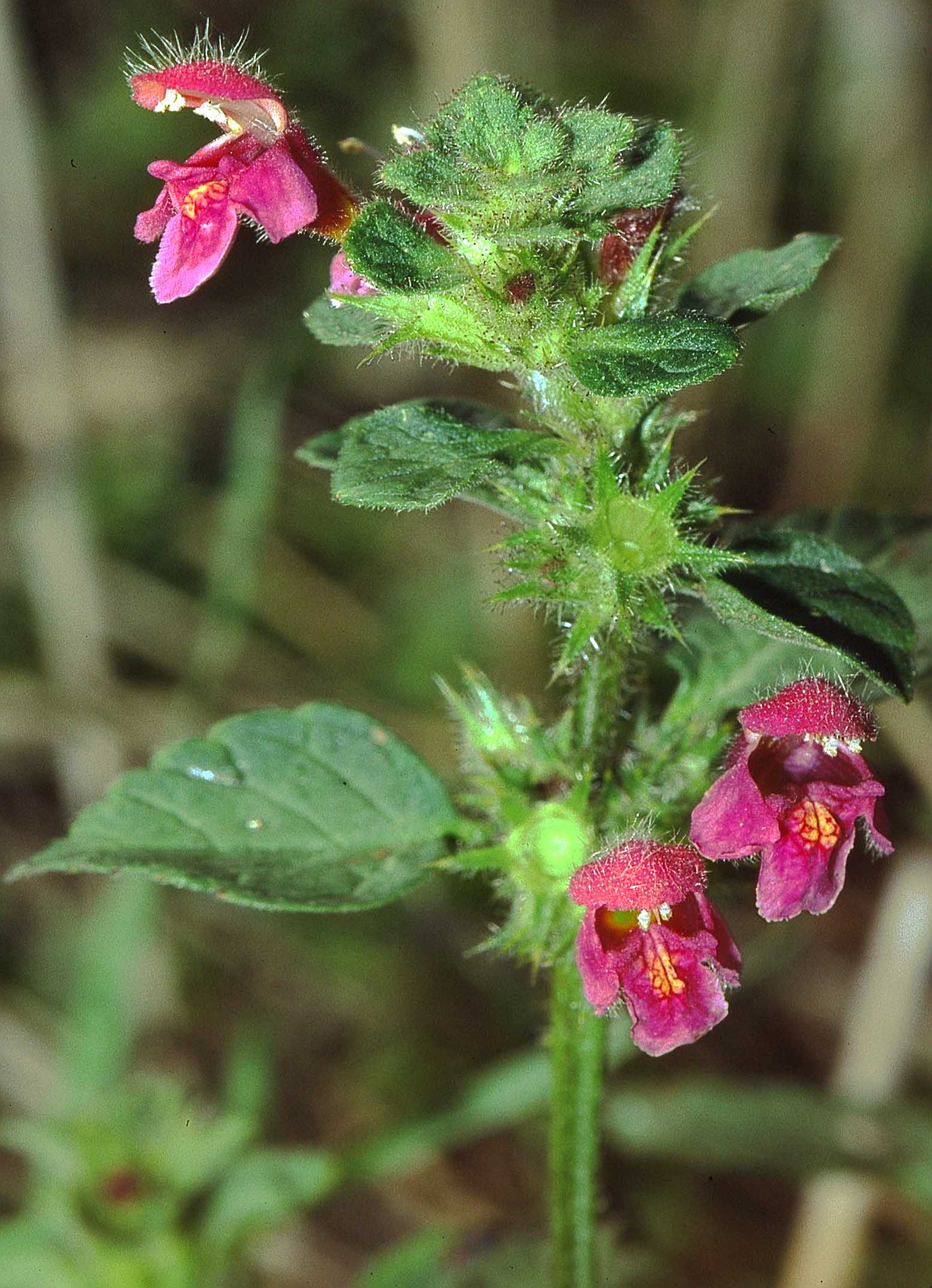

Scientific classification
- Kingdom: Plantae
- Clade: Tracheophytes
- Clade: Angiosperms
- Clade: Eudicots
- Clade: Asterids
- Order: Lamiales
- Family: Lamiaceae
- Genus: Galeopsis
- Species: G. pubescens

Binomial name
- Galeopsis pubescens Besser, 1809

Synonyms
- List: Galeopsis glandulifera Kit.; Galeopsis glandulifera Kit. ex Jáv., 1929; Galeopsis cannabina C.C.Gmel., 1806; Galeopsis ladanum var. grandiflora Rigo; Galeopsis murriana Borbás & Wettst. ex Murr; Galeopsis subspeciosa Borbás; Galeopsis sulfurea Jord.; Galeopsis tetrahit subsp. pubescens (Besser) Čelak., 1871; Galeopsis tetrahit subsp. pubescens Arcang., 1882; Galeopsis tetrahit var. pubescens (Besser) Benth.; Galeopsis variegata Wender.; Galeopsis versicolor Spenn.; Galeopsis walteriana Schltdl.; Galeopsis walterina Schltdl., 1823; Tetrahit sulfureum (Jord.) Fourr., 1869; Galeopsis walteriana Schltdl.

= Galeopsis pubescens =

Species of plant

Galeopsis pubescens, also known as the hairy and downy hempnettle, is a herbaceous annual plant species in the family Lamiaceae, that can be found growing in various European countries.

== Taxonomy ==
Galeopsis pubescens was for the first time described by Austrian botanist Wilibald Swibert Joseph Gottlieb von Besser in his work titled Primitiae Florae Galiciae Austriacae Utriusque in year 1809.

Some authors recognize two distinct subspecies of this species:

- Galeopsis pubescens subsp. murriana (Borbás & Wettst.) Murr
- Galeopsis pubescens subsp. pubescens

Some sources list three different varieties:

- Galeopsis pubescens var. carthusianorum Briq.
- Galeopsis pubescens var. minor Gaudin
- Galeopsis pubescens var. mollis Gaudin

There is also a long list of possible synonyms.

== Description ==
This upright-growing herbaceous annual hempnettle can reach from 20 to 50 centimetres of height and usually has spread out upper part. Its four-edged stem is covered with both soft and bristle-like hair, with bristles primarily covering plant's nodes. In most cases the stem is thickened right below the nodes. Its alternately arranged simple and entire leaves are always petiolate (with leafstalk), serrated and covered with trichomes. They can reach the length of 7 centimetres and are lanceolate to ovate-lanceolate in shape and end with sharpened point. There are no stipules.

The hempnettle's scarlet to scarlet red zygomorphic flowers can reach from 2 to 2.5 centimetres of size and are arranged into an apparent whorled inflorescence, which is actually an cyme. Galeopsis pubescens has typical sage family flowers with two-lipped corolla (so-called bilabiate flowers). Mutually fused petals have yellow corolla tube. The plant's upper lip is three-lobed, with the bigger white or yellow-spotted middle lobe and smaller side lobes. The scarlet coloured lower lip is bent and hirsute. The plant's sepals are also fused into a calyx tube, which is covered with thick layer of hair and ends with pointed calyx teeth.

Flowers lack any essential oils and hence do not have any special smell. This entomophilous plant's flowering period is between July and September. The plant's dry fruit are brown to black nutlets, that come in bundles of four, with each containing only one seed.

Layman can mistake Galeopsis pubescens with similar hempnettles, such as Galeopsis tetrahit and Galeopsis bifida, as well as some other species of the Lamiaceae family, such as Lamium maculatum.

In the past this hempnettle was used in traditional medicine.

== Distribution ==
Galeopsis pubescens is widely distributed across Europe; its distribution range spans from the eastern parts of France on the west to Russia with Caucasus and Siberia in the east. It appears as an introduced species in some parts of Asia.

This relatively common hempnettle can be found growing in many different habitats, including man-made ones. The plant usually grows in forests, on forest edges, near paths, on the fields, vineyards and in various ruderal landscapes, with its optimal habitat being different forest types (such as alluvial, oak-hornbeam, ravine, herb-rich beech, acidophilous thermophilous oak, Robinia pseudoacacia and spruce forests).

The Raunkiær system classifies it as a therophyte species, as it is an annual plant that survives unfavorable conditions in the form of seed.

== Gallery ==
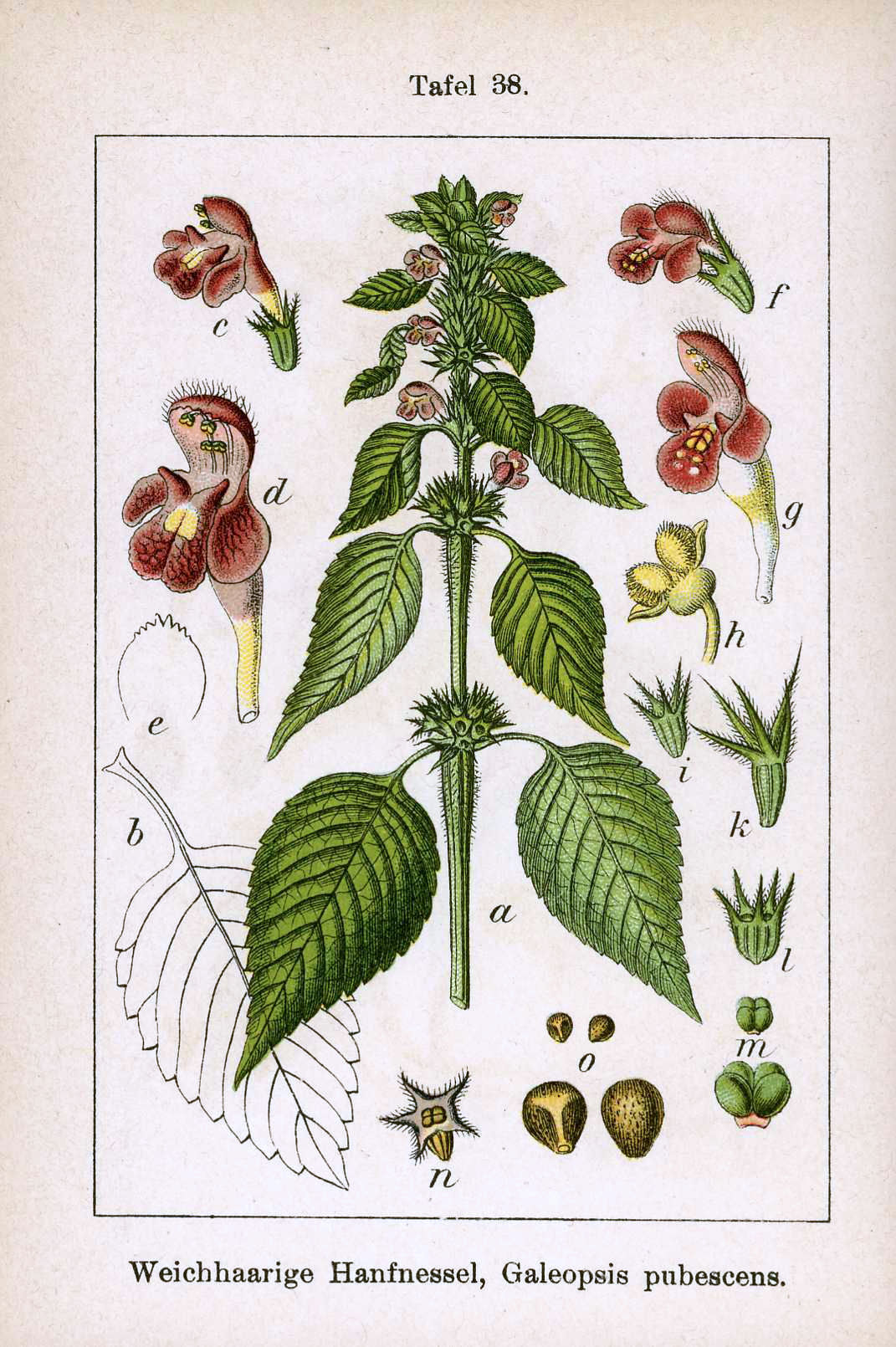

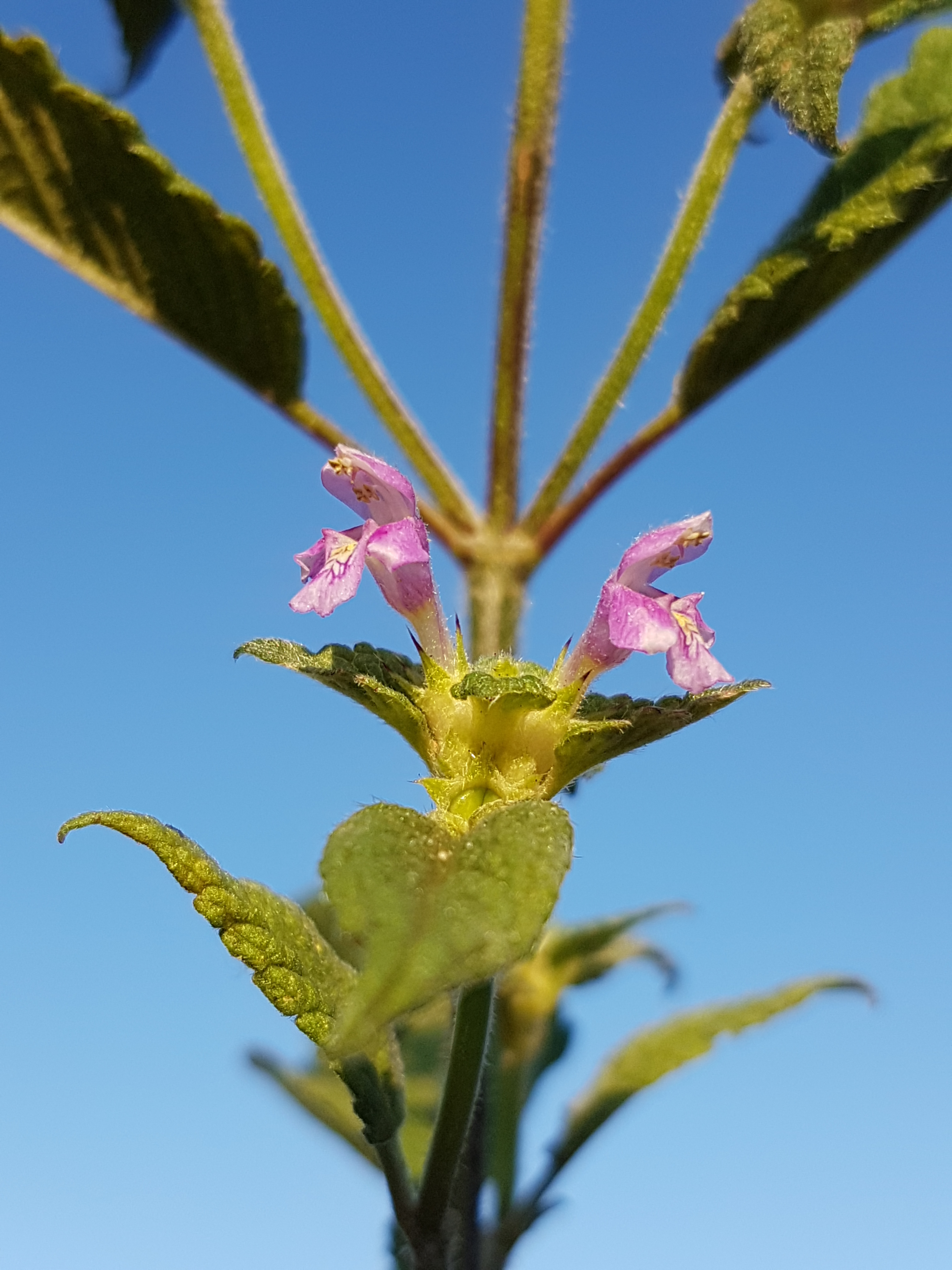

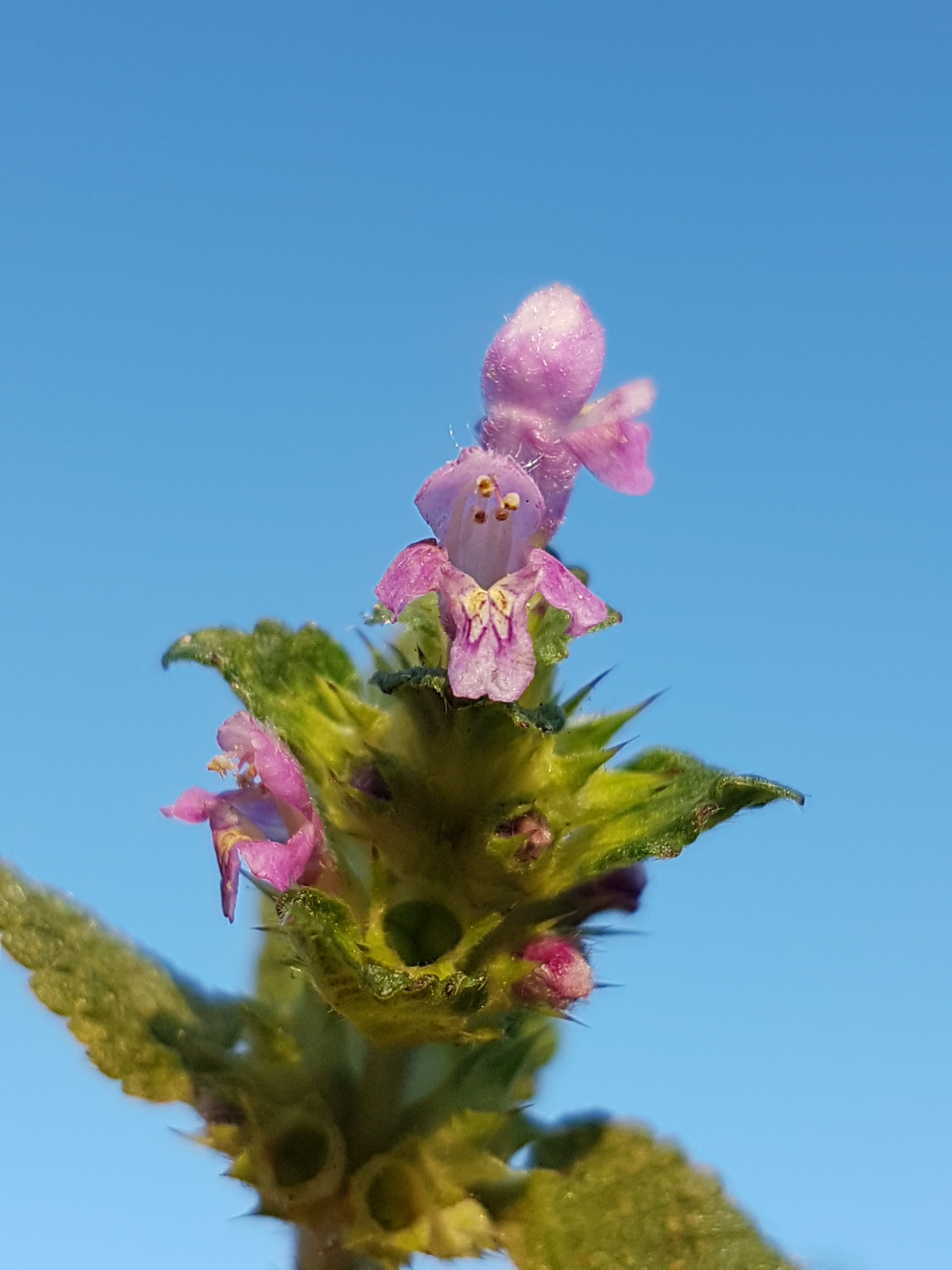

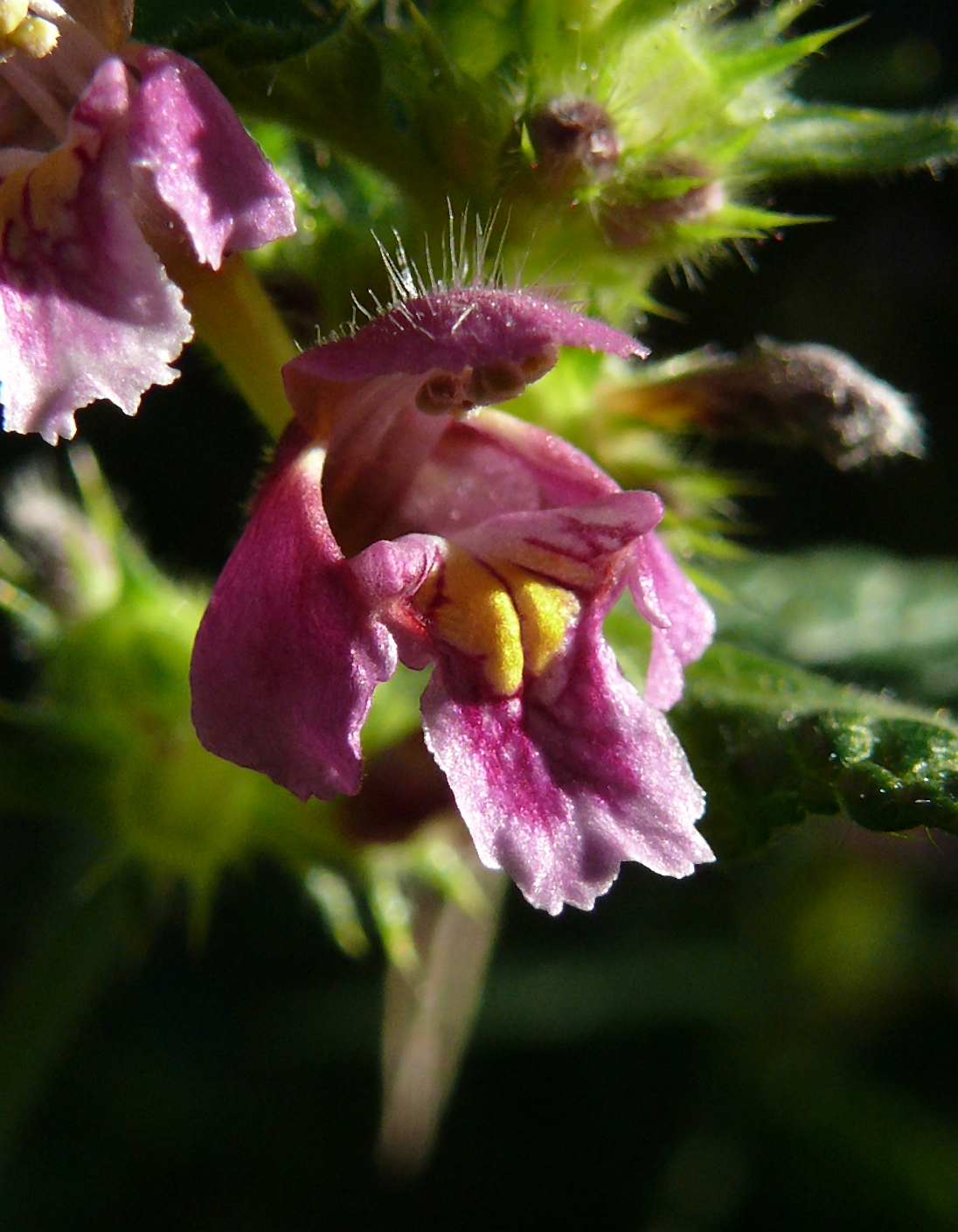

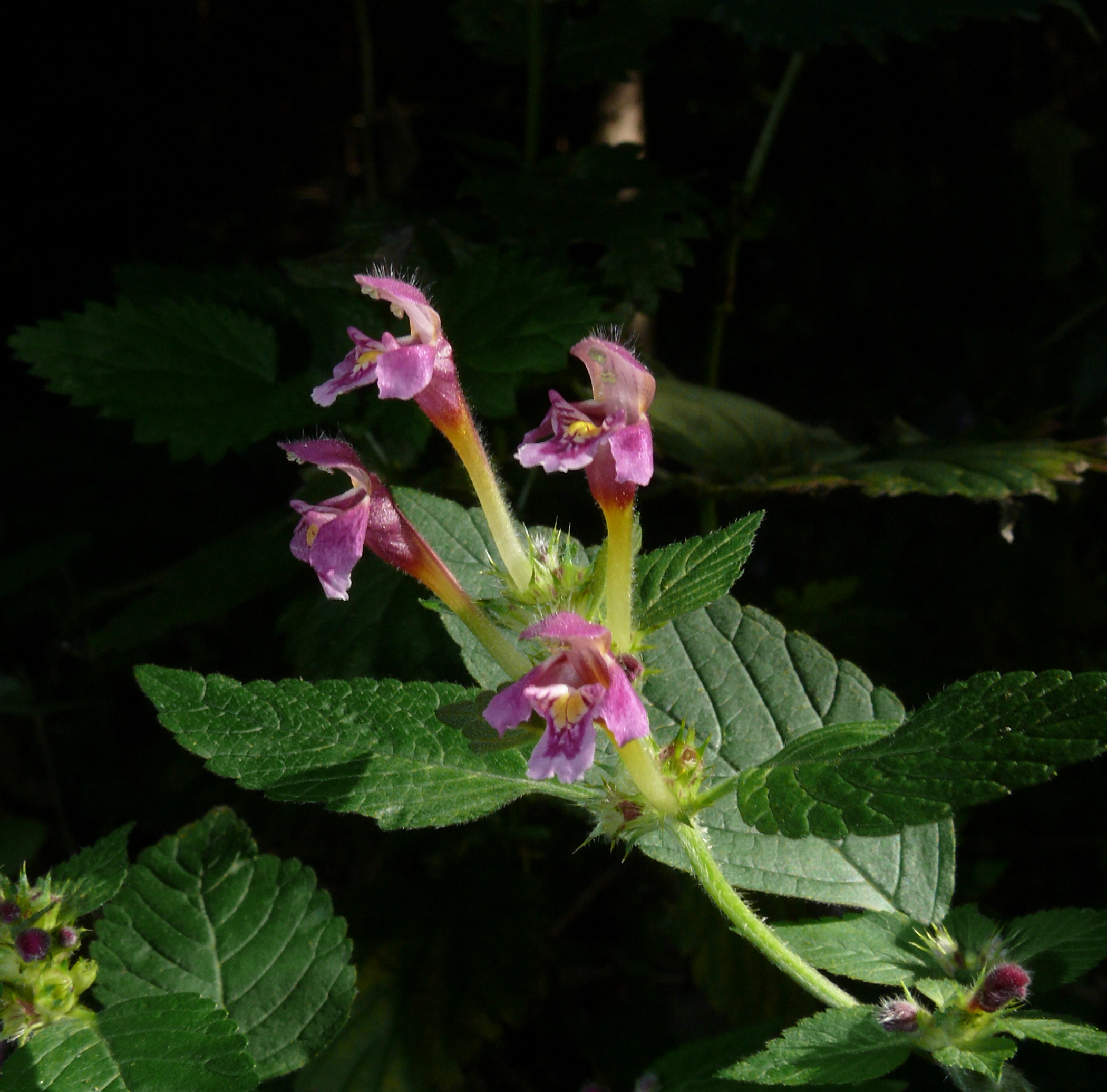

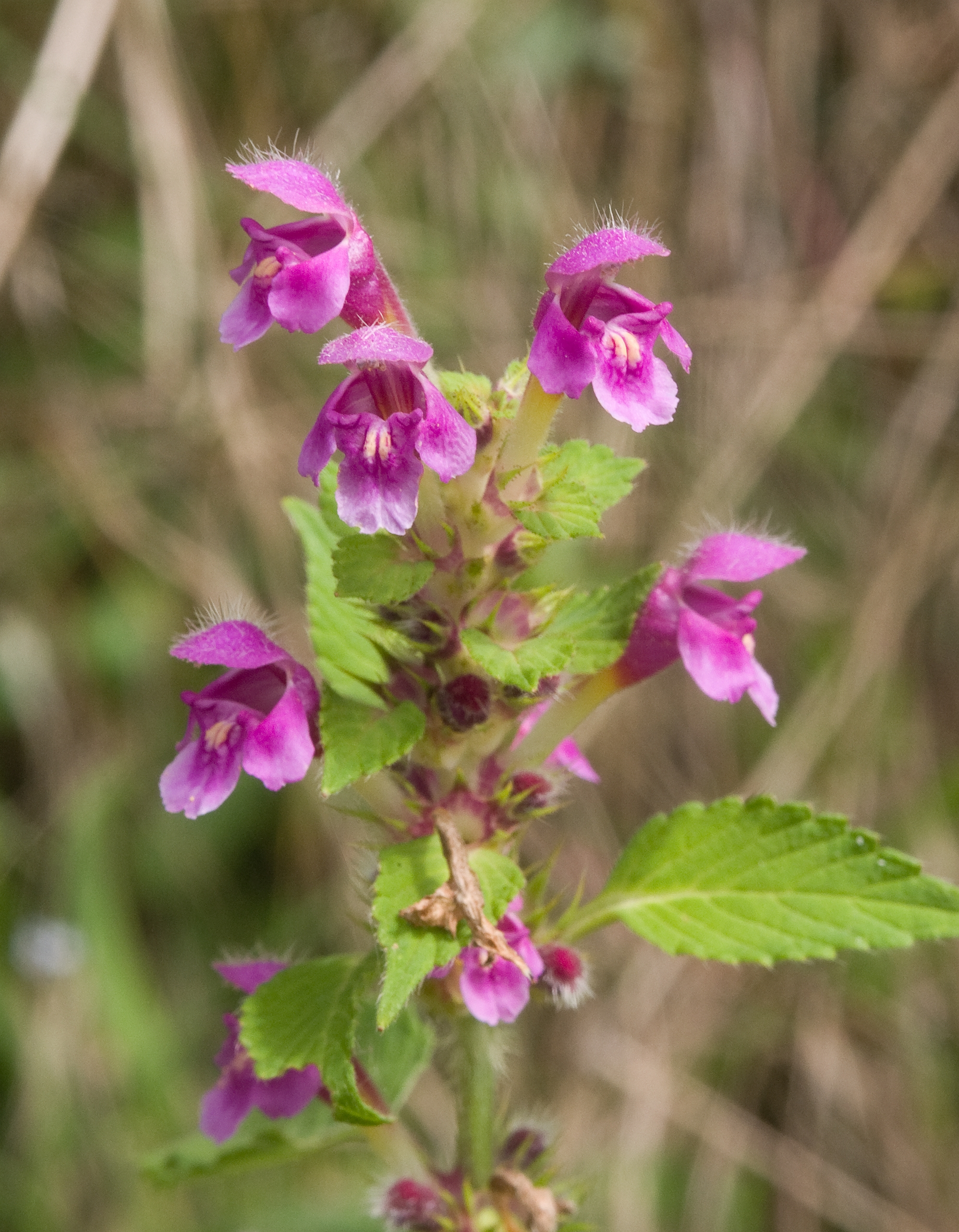

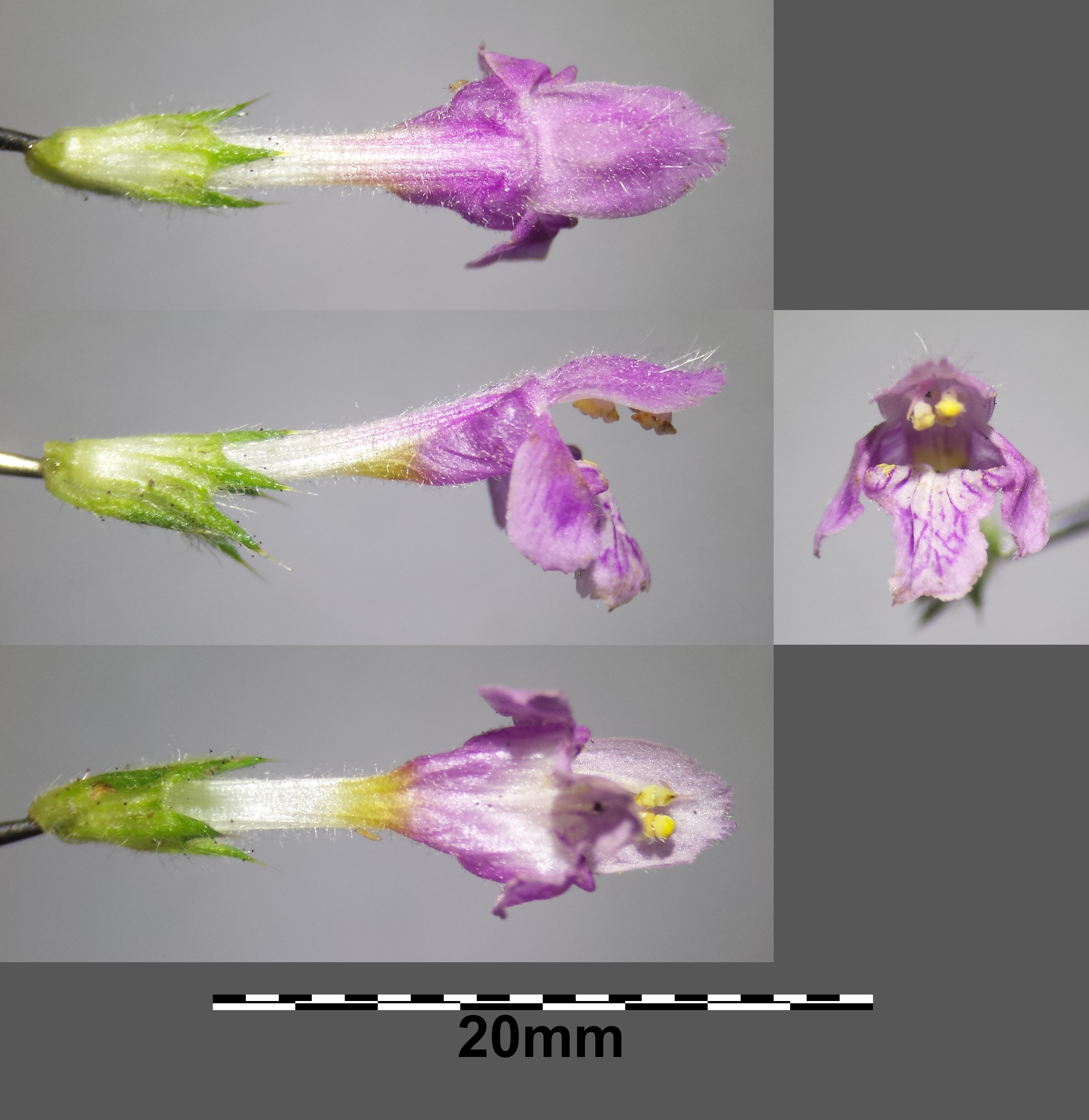

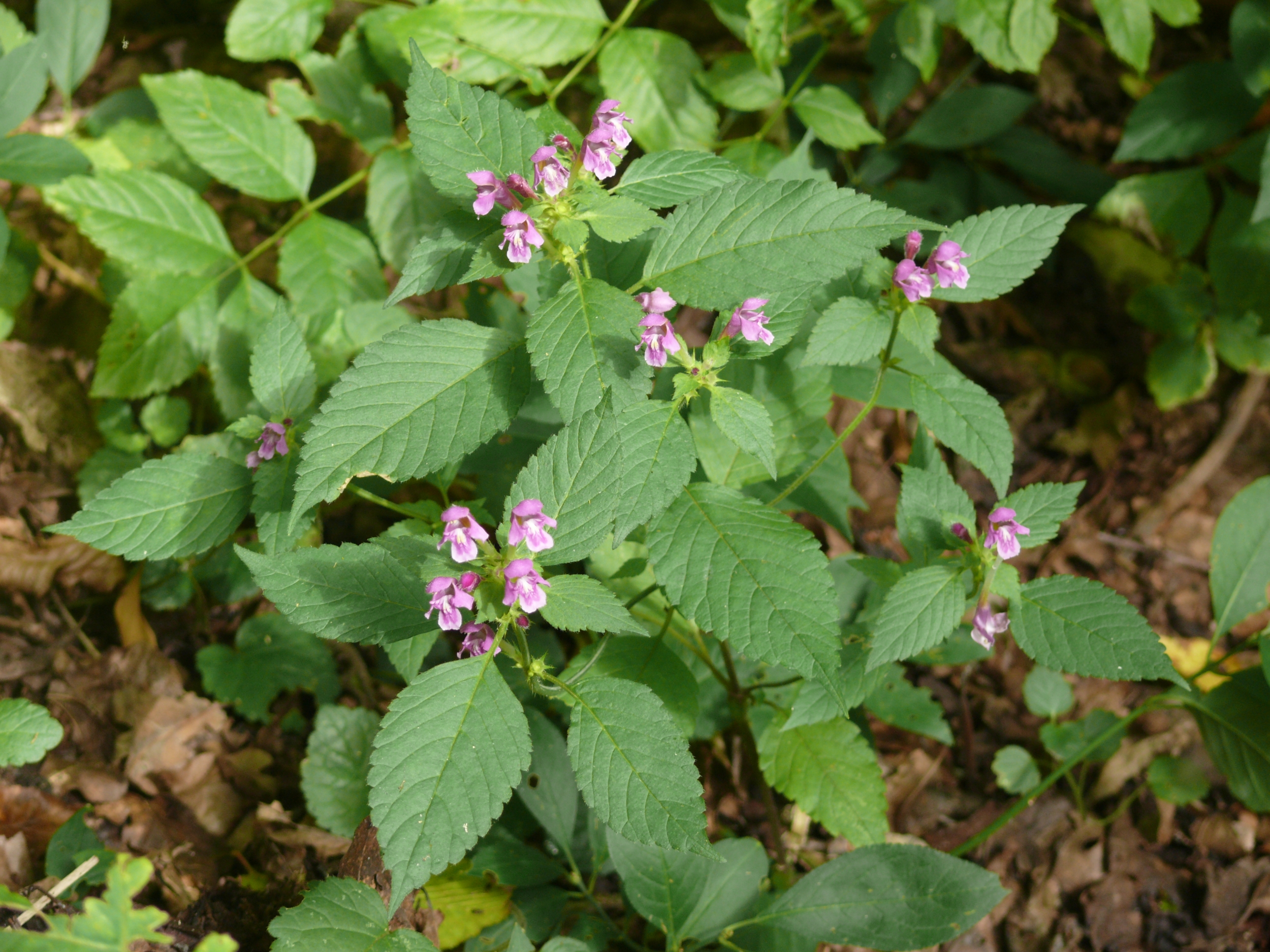
