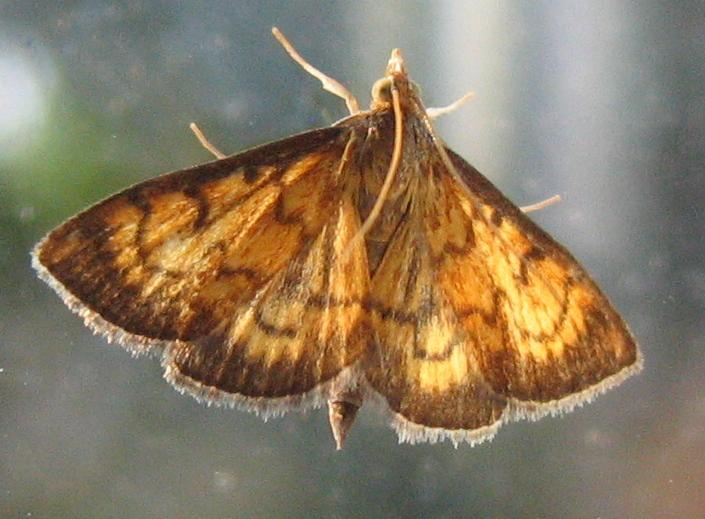
- Ecpyrrhorrhoe rubiginalis

Scientific classification
- Domain: Eukaryota
- Kingdom: Animalia
- Phylum: Arthropoda
- Class: Insecta
- Order: Lepidoptera
- Family: Crambidae
- Subfamily: Pyraustinae
- Genus: Ecpyrrhorrhoe; Hübner, 1825

Synonyms
- Ecpyrrhorrhoa J. L. R. Agassiz, 1846; Ecpyrrhorrhoea Hübner, 1826; Harpadispar Agenjo, 1952; Pyraustegia Marion, 1963; Yezobotys Munroe & Mutuura, 1969

= Ecpyrrhorrhoe =

Genus of moths

Ecpyrrhorrhoe is a genus of moths of the family Crambidae.

== Species ==
- Ecpyrrhorrhoe aduncis Gao, Zhang & Wang, 2013
- Ecpyrrhorrhoe angustivalvaris Gao, Zhang & Wang, 2013
- Ecpyrrhorrhoe biaculeiformis Zhang, Li & Wang in Zhang, Li & Wang, 2004
- Ecpyrrhorrhoe celatalis (Walker, 1859)
- Ecpyrrhorrhoe diffusalis (Guenée, 1854)
- Ecpyrrhorrhoe digitaliformis Zhang, Li & Wang in Zhang, Li & Wang, 2004
- Ecpyrrhorrhoe dissimilis (Yamanaka, 1958)
- Ecpyrrhorrhoe multispinalis Gao, Zhang & Wang, 2013
- Ecpyrrhorrhoe puralis (South in Leech & South, 1901)
- Ecpyrrhorrhoe rubiginalis (Hübner, 1796)
- Ecpyrrhorrhoe ruidispinalis Zhang, Li & Wang, 2004
