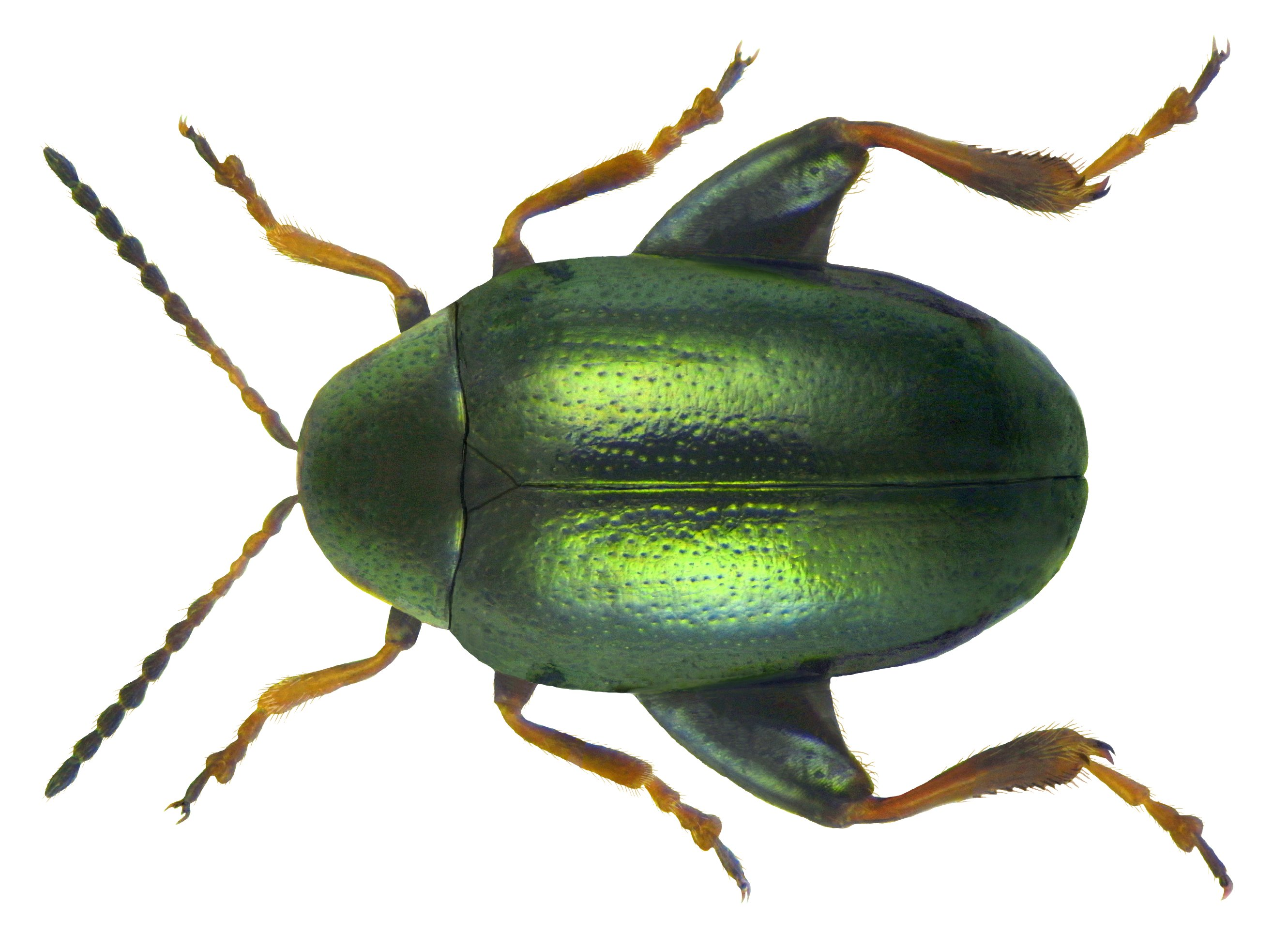

Scientific classification
- Kingdom: Animalia
- Phylum: Arthropoda
- Clade: Pancrustacea
- Class: Insecta
- Order: Coleoptera
- Suborder: Polyphaga
- Infraorder: Cucujiformia
- Family: Chrysomelidae
- Genus: Dibolia
- Species: D. cynoglossi

Binomial name
- Dibolia cynoglossi (Koch, 1803)

= Dibolia cynoglossi =

Species of beetle

Dibolia cynoglossi is a species of leaf beetle (Chrysomelidae family) that can be found nearly everywhere in Europe.
