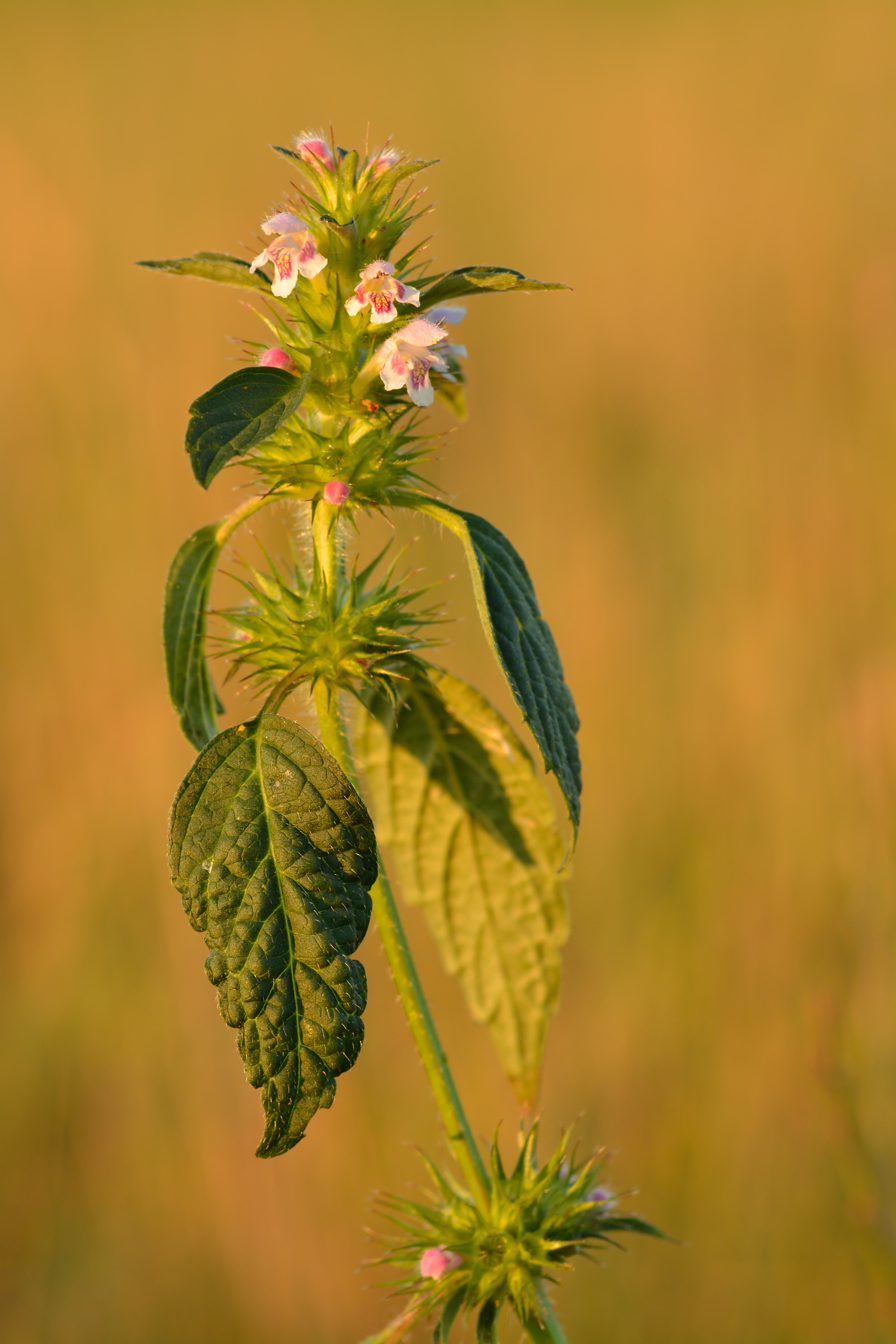

Scientific classification
- Kingdom: Plantae
- Clade: Tracheophytes
- Clade: Angiosperms
- Clade: Eudicots
- Clade: Asterids
- Order: Lamiales
- Family: Lamiaceae
- Genus: Galeopsis
- Species: G. tetrahit

Binomial name
- Galeopsis tetrahit L.

= Galeopsis tetrahit =

Common hemp-nettle

Species of plant

Galeopsis tetrahit, the common hemp-nettle or brittlestem hempnettle, is a flowering plant in the family Lamiaceae, native to Europe and northwestern Asia.

It is a herbaceous annual plant growing to 1 m tall; it is a pioneer species and thrives on disturbed sites or roadsides. The plant looks like mint but is taller. The stems have reflexed hairs and swollen nodes. In cross section, the stem is square. The leaves are rhombic to elliptic, with coarsely to bluntly serrate edges. The flowers are multicoloured, with purple, pink, or white areas; diminutive, bilateral and snapdragon-like, and are mostly visited by bumblebees.

The species is considered by some authorities to have arisen as a natural hybrid between Galeopsis pubescens and Galeopsis speciosa.

== Description ==
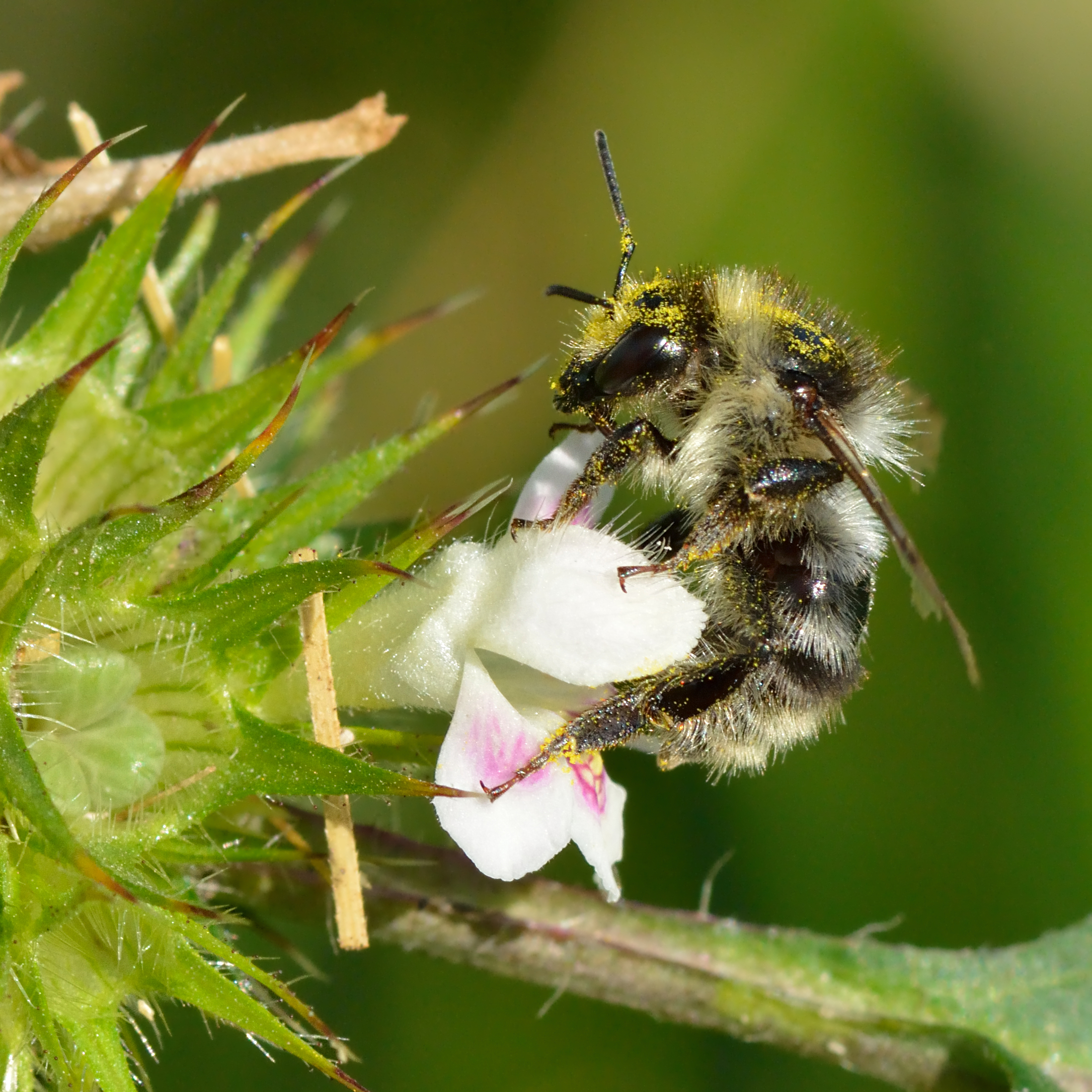
Pollination by Bombus veteranus

Common hemp-nettle is an erect annual plant and grows to a height of about 20 to 70 cm (8 to 28 in). The stem branches occasionally and is squarish and hairy, with glandular hairs on the upper part of the plant. The nodes are swollen and widely spaced and the pale green, stalked leaves are in opposite pairs. The leaf blades are hairy and are ovate with a long tapered tip and with regular large teeth on the margin. The inflorescence forms a terminal spike and is composed of whorls of pinkish flowers with dark markings on the lower lip. The calyx has five sharp-pointed lobes and the corolla forms a two-lipped flower about 15 to 20 mm (0.6 to 0.8 in) long with a fused tube. The upper lip of each flower is convex with dense, glandular hairs and the lower lip is three-lobed, the central lobe being the largest, squarish with a flat or rounded edge. There are four stamens, two long and two short, the gynoecium has two fused carpels and the fruit is a four-chambered schizocarp. The plant has a slightly unpleasant smell.

== Distribution and habitat ==
Common hemp-nettle is native to Europe and northwestern Asia. Its typical habitat is rough ground, arable land, logging clearances and waste places. It spreads readily as its sharp calyces adhere to clothing and animal pelts.
