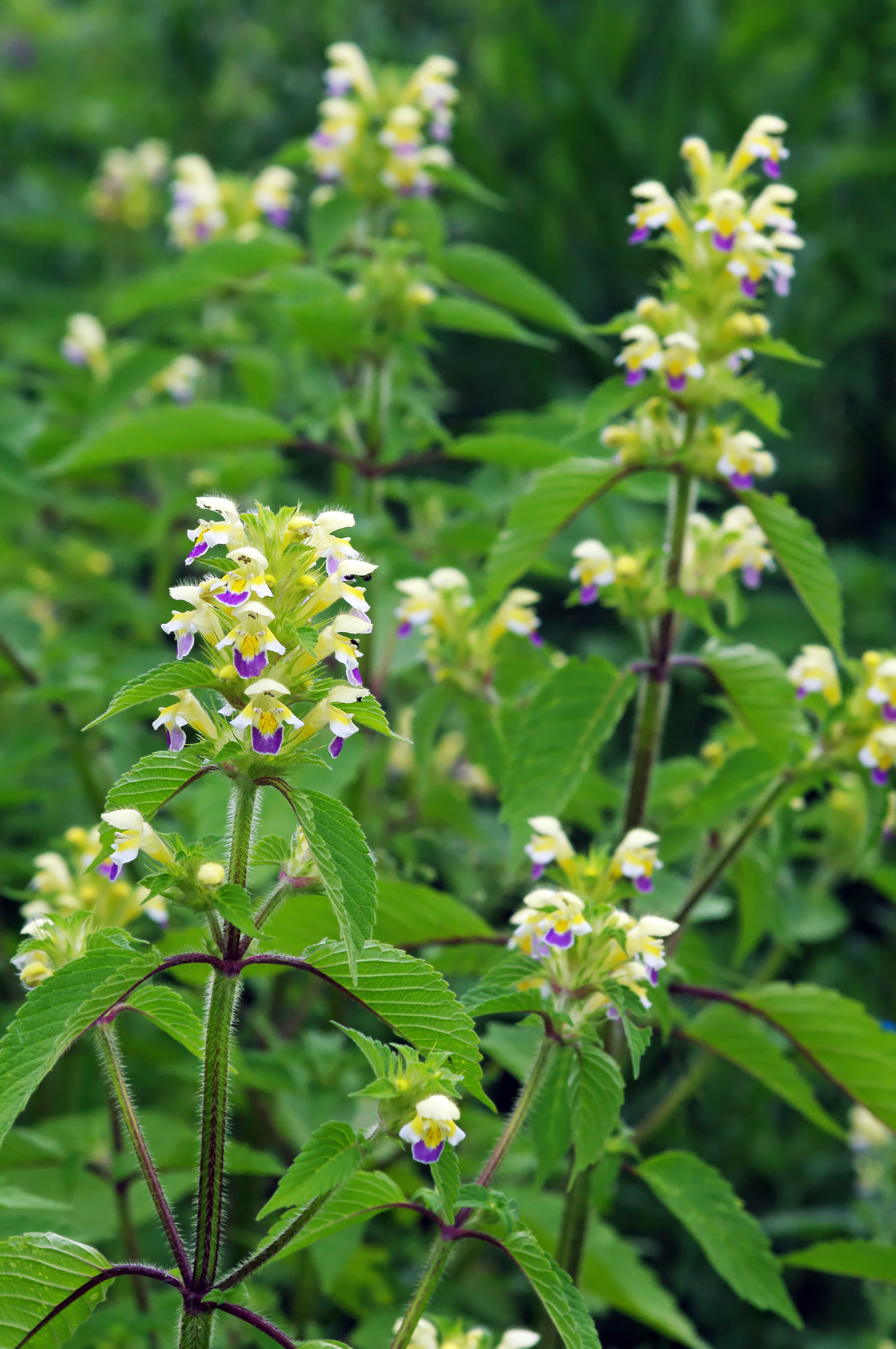

Scientific classification
- Kingdom: Plantae
- Clade: Tracheophytes
- Clade: Angiosperms
- Clade: Eudicots
- Clade: Asterids
- Order: Lamiales
- Family: Lamiaceae
- Genus: Galeopsis
- Species: G. speciosa

Binomial name
- Galeopsis speciosa Mill.

Synonyms
- Galeopsis prostrata Vill.; Galeopsis versicolor Curtis; Galeopsis unicolor Fr.; Galeopsis sulphurea Jord.; Galeopsis subalpina Schur; Tetrahit sulphureum (Jord.) Fourr.; Galeopsis flavescens Borbás; Galeopsis leiotricha Borbás; Galeopsis crenifrons Borbás; Galeopsis hispida Borbás

= Galeopsis speciosa =

Large-flowered hemp-nettle

Species of plant

Galeopsis speciosa, the large-flowered hemp-nettle or Edmonton hempnettle, is a species of annual herbaceous plants in the family Lamiaceae. It is native to northern and central Europe and Siberia. It has become a widespread introduced weed in Canada. The plant is poisonous and causes paralysis.
