= List of Euphrasia species =

The following is a list of all 215 species in the plant genus Euphrasia which are accepted by Plants of the World Online as of 20 June 2024.

- Euphrasia achibuenoensis J.M.Watson, D.Santos & A.R.Flores
- Euphrasia adenocaulon Juz.
- Euphrasia adenonota I.M.Johnst.
- Euphrasia ajanensis Vorosch.
- Euphrasia alba Pennell
- Euphrasia alii Qaiser & Siddiqui
- Euphrasia alpina Lam.
- Euphrasia alsa F.Muell.
- Euphrasia altaica Serg.
- Euphrasia amblyodonta Juz.
- Euphrasia amphisysepala W.R.Barker
- Euphrasia amplidens W.R.Barker
- Euphrasia amurensis Freyn
- Euphrasia andicola Benth.
- Euphrasia antarctica Benth.
- Euphrasia arctica Lange ex Rostrup
- Euphrasia × areschougii Wettst.
- Euphrasia arguta R.Br.
- Euphrasia aristulata Pennell
- Euphrasia atropurpurea (Rostr.) Ostenf.
- Euphrasia × atroviolacea Druce & Lumb
- Euphrasia australis Perrie
- Euphrasia azorica H.C.Watson
- Euphrasia bajankolica Juz.
- Euphrasia bakurianica Juz.
- Euphrasia bella S.T.Blake
- Euphrasia bhutanica Pugsley
- Euphrasia borneensis Stapf
- Euphrasia bottnica Kihlm.
- Euphrasia bowdeniae W.R.Barker
- Euphrasia brevilabris Yi F.Wang, Y.S.Lian & G.Z.Du
- Euphrasia calida Yeo
- Euphrasia callosa Pennell
- Euphrasia × calvescens Beck
- Euphrasia cambrica Pugsley
- Euphrasia campbelliae Pugsley
- Euphrasia caudata (J.H.Willis) W.R.Barker
- Euphrasia celebica P.Royen
- Euphrasia ceramensis P.Royen
- Euphrasia cheesemanii Wettst.
- Euphrasia chitrovoi Tzvelev
- Euphrasia × christii Favrat
- Euphrasia chumbica R.R.Mill
- Euphrasia ciliolata W.R.Barker
- Euphrasia cisalpina Pugsley
- Euphrasia cockayneana Petrie
- Euphrasia collina R.Br.
- Euphrasia confusa Pugsley
- Euphrasia corcontica (Smejkal) Smejkal & M.Dvoráková
- Euphrasia coreana W.Becker
- Euphrasia coreanalpina Nakai ex Kimura
- Euphrasia crassiuscula Gand.
- Euphrasia cucullata Pennell
- Euphrasia culminicola Wernham
- Euphrasia cuneata G.Forst.
- Euphrasia curviflora Pennell
- Euphrasia cuspidata Host
- Euphrasia cyclophylla Juz.
- Euphrasia daghestanica Juz.
- Euphrasia davidssonii Pugsley
- Euphrasia densiflora Pennell
- Euphrasia × difformis F.Towns.
- Euphrasia × digenea Wettst.
- Euphrasia × dilata Vitek
- Euphrasia dinarica (Beck) Murb.
- Euphrasia disjuncta Fernald & Wiegand
- Euphrasia disperma Hook.f.
- Euphrasia × drosocalyx Freyn
- Euphrasia drosophylla Juz.
- Euphrasia drucei Ashwin
- Euphrasia dunensis Wiinst.
- Euphrasia dyeri Wettst.
- Euphrasia eichleri W.R.Barker
- Euphrasia × electa F.Towns.
- Euphrasia × eurycarpa Pugsley
- Euphrasia exaristata Smejkal
- Euphrasia farlowii (B.L.Rob.) G.L.Gusarova
- Euphrasia × favratii Wettst.
- Euphrasia fedtschenkoana Wettst. ex Juz.
- Euphrasia flabellata Pennell
- Euphrasia flava Poir.
- Euphrasia foliosa Pennell
- Euphrasia formosissima Skottsb.
- Euphrasia foulaensis F.Towns. ex Wettst.
- Euphrasia fragosa W.R.Barker
- Euphrasia × freynii Wettst.
- Euphrasia frigida Pugsley
- Euphrasia gibbsiae Du Rietz
- Euphrasia × glanduligera Wettst.
- Euphrasia glandulosodentata Riedl
- Euphrasia glutinosocalycina Charit.
- Euphrasia grandiflora Hochst.
- Euphrasia × gremlii Wettst.
- Euphrasia grossheimii Kem.-Nath.
- Euphrasia hachijoensis Nakai ex Furumi
- Euphrasia × haussknechtii Wettst.
- Euphrasia heslop-harrisonii Pugsley
- Euphrasia himalayica Wettst.
- Euphrasia hirtella Jord. ex Reut.
- Euphrasia hookeri Wettst.
- Euphrasia hudsoniana Fernald & Wiegand
- Euphrasia humifusa Pennell
- Euphrasia hyperborea Jørg.
- Euphrasia illyrica Wettst.
- Euphrasia incisa Pennell
- Euphrasia inopinata Ehrend. & Vitek
- Euphrasia insignis Wettst.
- Euphrasia integrifolia Petrie
- Euphrasia integriloba J.J.Dmitriev & N.I.Rubtzov
- Euphrasia iranica O.Schwarz & Bornm.
- Euphrasia jacutica Juz.
- Euphrasia × jaeggii Wettst.
- Euphrasia jaeschkei Wettst.
- Euphrasia juzepczukii Denissova
- Euphrasia karataviensis Govor.
- Euphrasia kashmiriana Pugsley
- Euphrasia kemulariae Juz.
- Euphrasia kisoalpina Hid.Takah. & Ohba
- Euphrasia kjellbergii Du Rietz
- Euphrasia krassnovii Juz.
- Euphrasia krylovii Serg.
- Euphrasia kurramensis Pennell
- Euphrasia laingii Petrie
- Euphrasia lamii Diels
- Euphrasia lasianthera W.R.Barker
- Euphrasia laxa Pennell
- Euphrasia lebardensis Kem.-Nath.
- Euphrasia × lerschii I.Györffy
- Euphrasia × levieri Wettst.
- Euphrasia liburnica Wettst.
- Euphrasia macrocalyx Juz.
- Euphrasia macrodonta Juz. ex Ganesch.
- Euphrasia marchesettii Wettst.
- Euphrasia marshallii Pugsley
- Euphrasia matsumurae Nakai
- Euphrasia maximowiczii Wettst. ex Palib.
- Euphrasia melanosticta R.R.Mill
- Euphrasia merrillii Du Rietz
- Euphrasia micrantha Rchb.
- Euphrasia microcarpa Pennell
- Euphrasia microphylla Koidz.
- Euphrasia minima Jacq. ex DC.
- Euphrasia mirabilis Pennell
- Euphrasia mollis (Ledeb.) Wettst.
- Euphrasia monroi Hook.f.
- Euphrasia multiflora Pennell
- Euphrasia multifolia Wettst.
- Euphrasia × murbeckii Wettst.
- Euphrasia muscosa Phil.
- Euphrasia nana (Rouy) Prain
- Euphrasia nankotaizanensis Yamam.
- Euphrasia nemorosa (Pers.) Wallr.
- Euphrasia nepalensis Pugsley
- Euphrasia × notata F.Towns.
- Euphrasia oakesii Wettst.
- Euphrasia officinalis L.
- Euphrasia omeri Qaiser & Siddiqui
- Euphrasia onegensis Cojand. ex Serg.
- Euphrasia orthocheila W.R.Barker
- Euphrasia ossica Juz. ex Ganesch.
- Euphrasia ostenfeldii (Pugsley) Yeo
- Euphrasia paghmanensis Rech.f.
- Euphrasia papuana Schltr.
- Euphrasia paucifolia Wettst.
- Euphrasia pectinata Ten.
- Euphrasia peduncularis Juz.
- Euphrasia petiolaris Wettst.
- Euphrasia petriei Ashwin
- Euphrasia philippinensis Du Rietz
- Euphrasia phragmostoma W.R.Barker
- Euphrasia picta Wimm.
- Euphrasia pinifolia Poir.
- Euphrasia platyphylla Pennell
- Euphrasia portae Wettst.
- Euphrasia × pratiuscola F.Towns.
- Euphrasia pseudokerneri Pugsley
- Euphrasia pseudopaucifolia T.Siddiqui & Qaiser
- Euphrasia × pulchella A.Kern.
- Euphrasia qaiseri Siddiqui
- Euphrasia ramulosa W.R.Barker
- Euphrasia randii B.L.Rob.
- Euphrasia rectiflora Pennell
- Euphrasia regelii Wettst.
- Euphrasia remota Pennell
- Euphrasia repens Hook.f.
- Euphrasia retroticha Nakai ex Yamaz.
- Euphrasia × reuteri Wettst.
- Euphrasia revoluta Hook.f.
- Euphrasia × rhumica Pugsley
- Euphrasia rivularis Pugsley
- Euphrasia rotundifolia Pugsley
- Euphrasia ruptura W.R.Barker
- Euphrasia salisburgensis Funck ex Hoppe
- Euphrasia scabra R.Br.
- Euphrasia schischkinii Serg.
- Euphrasia schlagintweitii Wettst.
- Euphrasia schugnanica Juz.
- Euphrasia scottica Wettst.
- Euphrasia scutellarioides Wernham
- Euphrasia secundiflora Pennell
- Euphrasia semipicta W.R.Barker
- Euphrasia setulosa Pugsley
- Euphrasia sevanensis Juz.
- Euphrasia sibirica Serg.
- Euphrasia simplex D.Don
- Euphrasia sinuata Vitek & Ehrend.
- Euphrasia slovaca (Yeo) Holub
- Euphrasia sosnowskyi Kem.-Nath.
- Euphrasia spatulifolia Pennell
- Euphrasia stipitata Smejkal
- Euphrasia striata R.Br.
- Euphrasia stricta J.P.Wolff ex J.F.Lehm.
- Euphrasia subarctica Raup
- Euphrasia subexserta Benth.
- Euphrasia suborbicularis Y.Sell & Yeo
- Euphrasia svanica Kem.-Nath.
- Euphrasia syreitschikovii Govor.
- Euphrasia tarokoana Ohzoi
- Euphrasia tatarica Fisch. ex Spreng.
- Euphrasia tatrae Wettst.
- Euphrasia taurica Ganesch.
- Euphrasia tetraquetra (Bréb.) Arrond.
- Euphrasia tirolensis Pugsley
- Euphrasia townsonii Petrie
- Euphrasia transmorrisonensis Hayata
- Euphrasia tranzschelii Juz.
- Euphrasia tricuspidata L.
- Euphrasia trifida Poepp. ex Benth.
- Euphrasia × trikoviana Vitek
- Euphrasia ultima J.Hartmann & Schönsw.
- Euphrasia ussuriensis Juz.
- Euphrasia × valentinii Smejkal
- Euphrasia × venusta F.Towns.
- Euphrasia × vernalis List
- Euphrasia versteegii (Diels) Du Rietz
- Euphrasia × vestinensis Wettst.
- Euphrasia vigursii Davey
- Euphrasia × villosa Callen
- Euphrasia vinacea Y.Sell & Yeo
- Euphrasia wettsteinii G.L.Gusarova
- Euphrasia willkommii Freyn
- Euphrasia woronowii Juz.
- Euphrasia yabeana Nakai
- Euphrasia yezoensis H.Hara
- Euphrasia zelandica Wettst.
