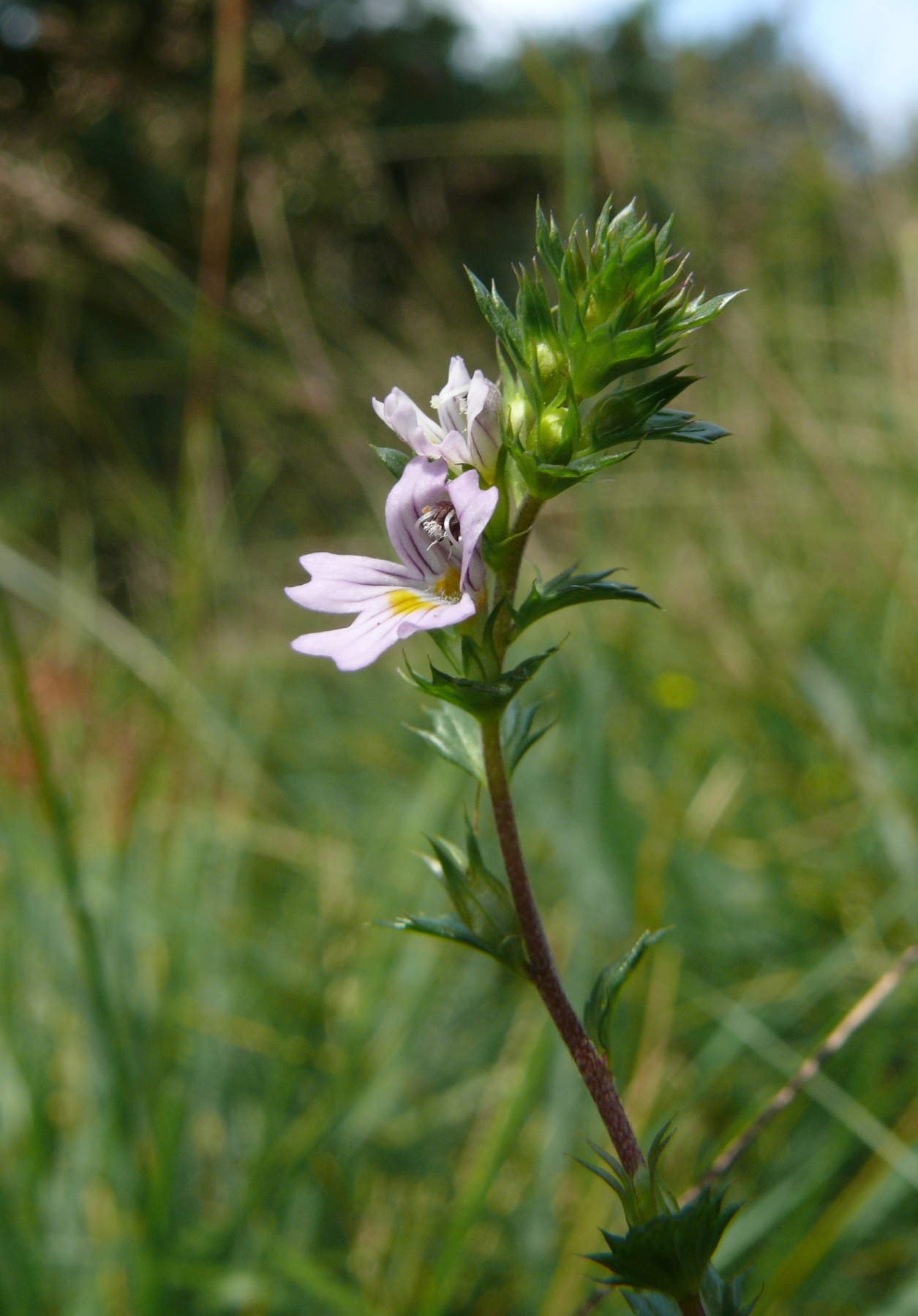

Scientific classification
- Kingdom: Plantae
- Clade: Embryophytes
- Clade: Tracheophytes
- Clade: Spermatophytes
- Clade: Angiosperms
- Clade: Eudicots
- Clade: Asterids
- Order: Lamiales
- Family: Orobanchaceae
- Genus: Euphrasia
- Species: E. stricta

Binomial name
- Euphrasia stricta J.P.Wolff ex J.F.Lehm.

Synonyms
- Bartsia stricta (Kunth) Benth

= Euphrasia stricta =

Species of flowering plant in the broomrape family

Euphrasia stricta, the drug eyebright, is an annual forb in the genus Euphrasia.

It has been introduced in northeastern North America, where it is found in New England (except Connecticut), New York, Pennsylvania, Nova Scotia, New Brunswick, Prince Edward Island, Ontario, Quebec, the upper peninsula of Michigan, northern Wisconsin, Minnesota and Illinois. It is also found in Central Europe and Pyrenees

The preferred growing location is on moist, calcareous sands, such as those on some moors and dunes. The plant is a hemiparasite and can steal water and salts from grasses.

== Uses ==
Euphrasia stricta is used in herbal medicine to treat inflammatory eye conditions, most notably allergic conjunctivitis. The German Commission E did not consider there to be sufficient evidence to prove eyebright is useful for any condition. Human clinical trials are lacking to support traditional claims, though absence of evidence is not proof of inefficacy.

== See also ==
- Euphrasia rostkoviana
