= Euphrasia vernalis =

Scientific classification
- Kingdom: Plantae
- Clade: Tracheophytes
- Clade: Angiosperms
- Clade: Eudicots
- Clade: Asterids
- Order: Lamiales
- Family: Orobanchaceae
- Genus: Euphrasia
- Species: E. vernalis

Binomial name
- Euphrasia vernalis List

Species of flowering plant

Euphrasia vernalis is a species of flowering plant belonging to the family Orobanchaceae.
