= Euphrasia vigursii =

Scientific classification
- Kingdom: Plantae
- Clade: Tracheophytes
- Clade: Angiosperms
- Clade: Eudicots
- Clade: Asterids
- Order: Lamiales
- Family: Orobanchaceae
- Genus: Euphrasia
- Species: E. vigursii

Binomial name
- Euphrasia vigursii Davey, 1907

Species of flowering plant in the broomrape family

Euphrasia vigursii, also known by its common names of Vigur's eyebright or Cornish eyebright, is an endangered annual of the eyebright family which is endemic to Devon and Cornwall. It is a facultative hemiparasite and needs open conditions and regular grazing of larger shrubs and grasses to grow. It is named after C. C. Vigurs, a Cornish doctor and botanist.

== Appearance ==
E. vigursii can be identified by its bright reddish-purple flowers and long glandular hairs on its upper leaves. It has dull grey-green leaves, often permeated with violet or black due to anthocyanins. It is considered a stable hybrid between Euphrasia micrantha and Euphrasia anglica.

== Distribution ==
E. vigursii is endemic to the Agrostis curtisii-Ulex galli heathlands of South West England, specifically Cornwall and Devon. The largest global population of E. virgusii is believed to be Lydford High Down in Dartmoor National Park, Devon, which had 21,000 instances in 2002. This dropped as low as 97 in 2004 but has since recovered to a stable level at between 250 and 350 (for comparison, levels recorded at other sites in Devon have never reached more than 10). It has been recorded in the Mid Cornwall Moors SSSI, which was created in 2017.
