= Euphrasia hookeri =

Scientific classification
- Kingdom: Plantae
- Clade: Tracheophytes
- Clade: Angiosperms
- Clade: Eudicots
- Clade: Asterids
- Order: Lamiales
- Family: Orobanchaceae
- Genus: Euphrasia
- Species: E. hookeri

Binomial name
- Euphrasia hookeri Wettst.

Species of plant

Euphrasia hookeri is a species of plant native to the Australian state of Tasmania, where species of ''Euphrasia'' are commonly found in alpine, subalpine, and temperate environments, including grasslands and heathlands.

Species of the genus Euphrasia are commonly known as eyebrights and are typically small, herbaceous plants that are often partially parasitic on the roots of other plants.
