= Euphrasia brevipila =

Scientific classification
- Kingdom: Plantae
- Clade: Tracheophytes
- Clade: Angiosperms
- Clade: Eudicots
- Clade: Asterids
- Order: Lamiales
- Family: Orobanchaceae
- Genus: Euphrasia
- Species: E. brevipila

Binomial name
- Euphrasia brevipila Burn. & Gremli

Species of flowering plant

Euphrasia brevipila is a species of flowering plant belonging to the family Orobanchaceae.

Its native range is Europe and European Russia.
