= Euphrasia parviflora =

Scientific classification
- Kingdom: Plantae
- Clade: Tracheophytes
- Clade: Angiosperms
- Clade: Eudicots
- Clade: Asterids
- Order: Lamiales
- Family: Orobanchaceae
- Genus: Euphrasia
- Species: E. parviflora

Binomial name
- Euphrasia parviflora Schag.

Species of flowering plant

Euphrasia parviflora is a species of flowering plant belonging to the family Orobanchaceae.

Synonym:

- Euphrasia curta subsp. glabrescens Smejkal
- Euphrasia officinalis f. curta Fr.
