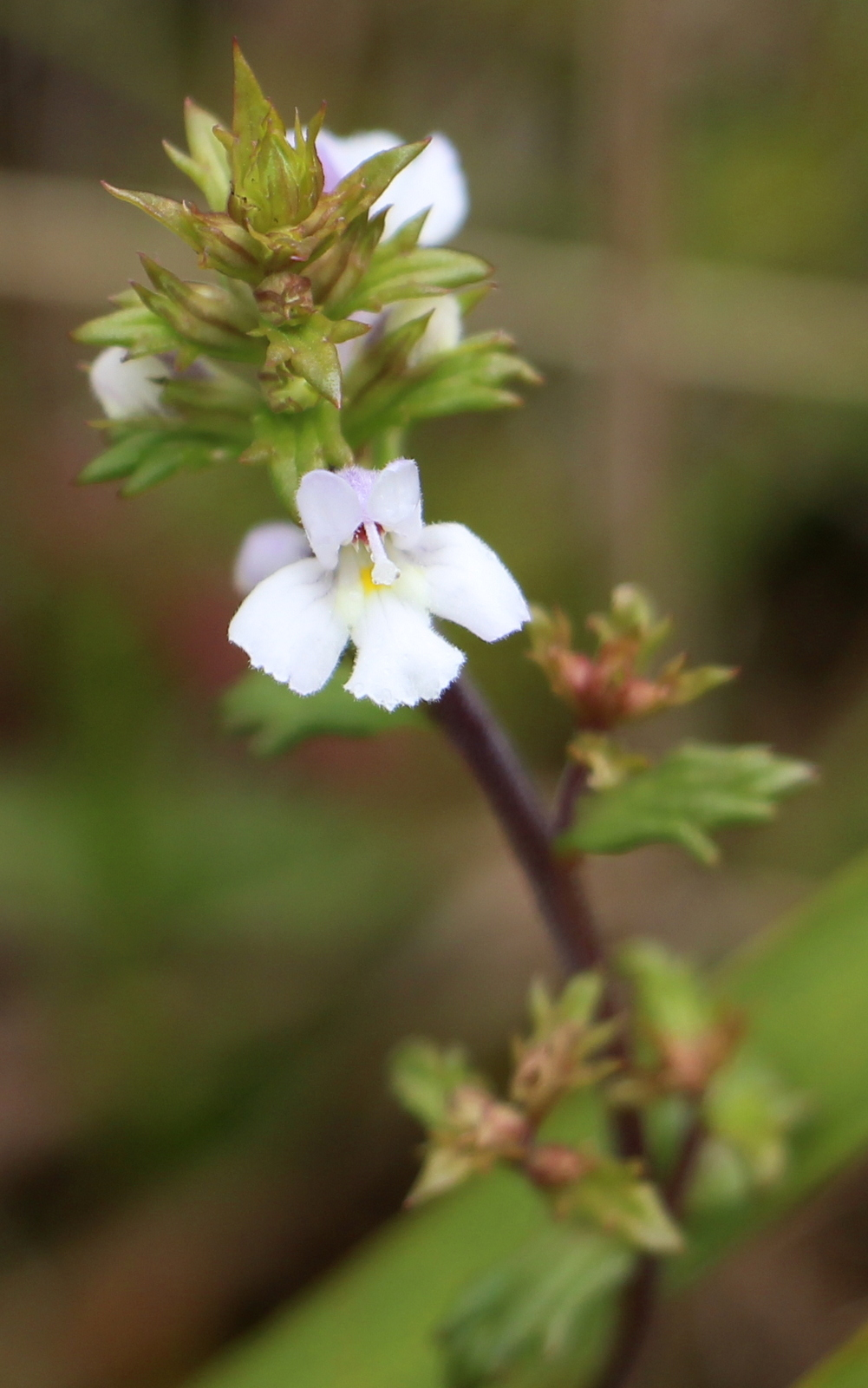

Scientific classification
- Kingdom: Plantae
- Clade: Tracheophytes
- Clade: Angiosperms
- Clade: Eudicots
- Clade: Asterids
- Order: Lamiales
- Family: Orobanchaceae
- Genus: Euphrasia
- Species: E. arguta

Binomial name
- Euphrasia arguta R.Br.

Synonyms
- Euphrasia scabra var. arguta

= Euphrasia arguta =

Species of flowering plant from Australia

Euphrasia arguta is a plant in the family Orobanchaceae. Plants in the genus Euphrasia are collectively known as the eyebrights.

The species was last recorded in June 1904 near Tamworth, New South Wales, Australia, and was presumed extinct until rediscovered in 2008 by Forests NSW worker Graham Marshall in NSW's Nundle State Forest.

Some scientists consider that it is a variety of the threatened Euphrasia scabra. Previously the whole genus Euphrasia was regarded as part of the family Scrophulariaceae. It was first described by Robert Brown in his reference work Prodromus Florae Novae Hollandiae et Insulae Van Diemen in 1810.

A further identification of the plant was reported from the Barrington Tops in 2012.

== Description ==
The erect stem of this annual herb reaches a height from 20 to 35 centimetres and is covered with dense hairs. The deeply lobed leaves are opposite. The upper stem leaves with a length of about six to fourteen millimetres and a width from 3.5 to 13 millimetres are ovate-elliptic. The racemes consists of 50 to 90 flowers. The length of the usually scabrous calyx reaches from 5.5 to 7 millimetres. The corolla measures from ten to fourteen millimetres coloured from white to lilac with yellow markings. The tube is 6.7 to 8.5 millimetres long and the anthers 0.9 to 1.7 millimetres. The capsule has a length of 4 to 7.5 millimetres and is bristly at the upper half. Like the other eyebright species Euphrasia arguta is a partial parasite and is connected through a haustorium to the rootlets of other plants.

The flowering period is from October to January.

== Occurrence ==
Its previous habitat consists of grassy areas near rivers in elevations until 700 m asl with an annual rainfall of 600 mm. It was native in the ecoregions North Coast (NC), Northern Tablelands (NT), Central Tablelands (CT), North West Slopes (NWS) and Central West Slopes (CWS) in the Australian state of New South Wales, in particular in the areas from Bathurst to Walcha.

== Status ==
In 1982 Australian botanist William R. Barker stated in his study "Taxonomic studies in Euphrasia L. (Scrophulariaceae). A revised infrageneric classification, and a revision of the genus in Australia" in the Journal of the Adelaide Botanic Gardens that Euphrasia arguta was not collected for at least 75 years. In 1997 the World Conservation Monitoring Centre compiled it into the IUCN Red List of Threatened Plants within the category "globally extinct". After the enacting of the Environment Protection and Biodiversity Conservation Act in 2000 it was listed as officially extinct in July 2000 by the Australian government.

On 6 July 2008 Ian MacDonald, New South Wales Primary Industries Minister, announced that forestry workers had rediscovered specimens of Euphrasia arguta in Nundle State Forest, New South Wales.
