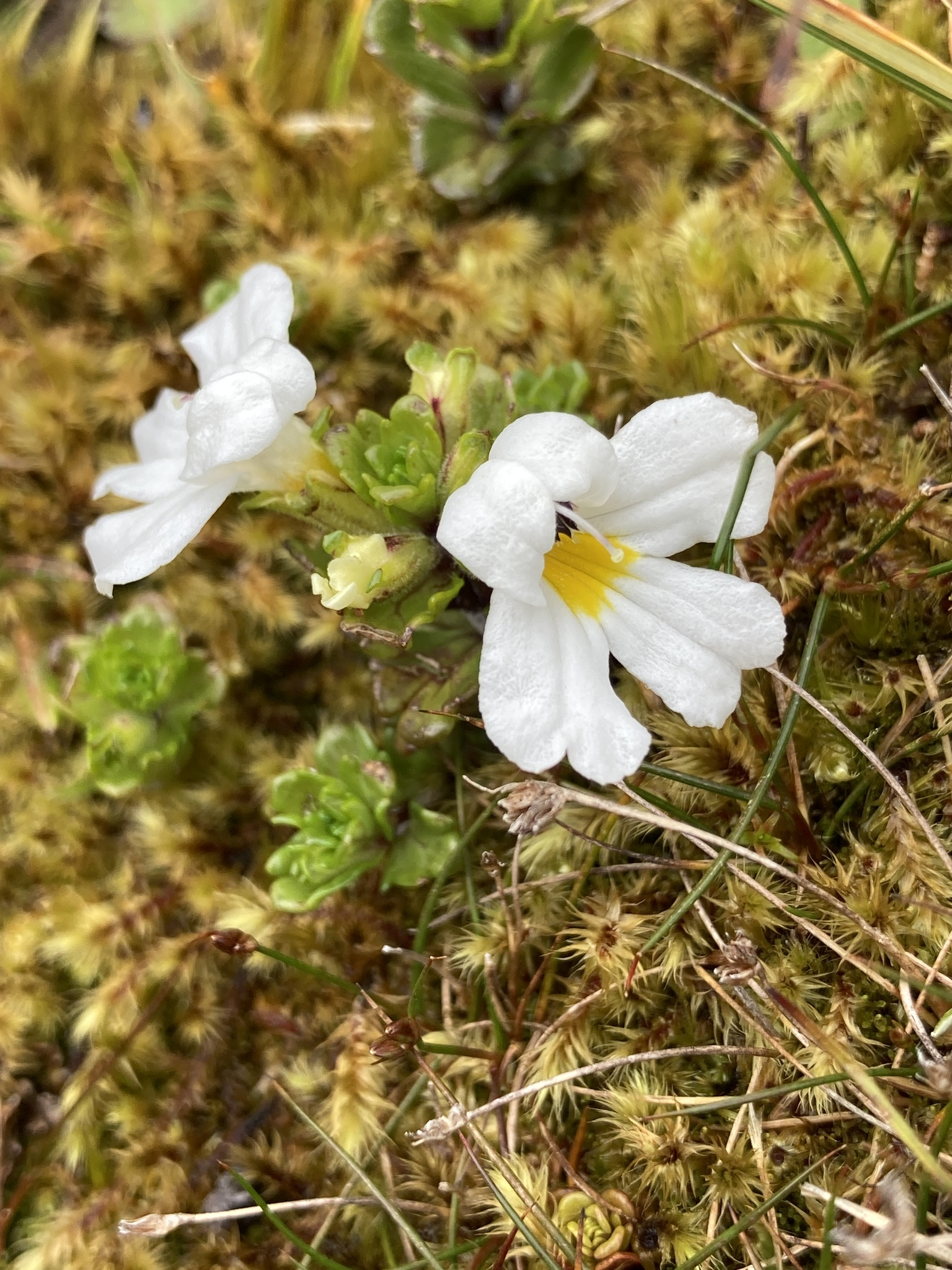
- Euphrasia revoluta in Arthur's Pass National Park

Conservation status
- Not Threatened (NZ TCS)

Scientific classification
- Kingdom: Plantae
- Clade: Tracheophytes
- Clade: Angiosperms
- Clade: Eudicots
- Clade: Asterids
- Order: Lamiales
- Family: Orobanchaceae
- Genus: Euphrasia
- Species: E. revoluta

Binomial name
- Euphrasia revoluta Hook.f.

= Euphrasia revoluta =

Species of flowering plant

Euphrasia revoluta, or eyebright, is a species of flower, endemic to New Zealand. Eyebright is the name for the collective genus, as well as for this particular flower.

== Description ==
The flower pedicels are white and yellow on the inside, and bloom from December to February, although sometimes earlier or later.

The seeds are anemochorous, meaning wind-dispersed.

== Distribution and habitat ==
This species is known from the North and South Island. It is found in the Ruahine and Tararua Ranges, and further south.

It lives in open places, whether that be in subalpine bogs, grasslands, or herbfields.

== Etymology ==
Revoluta is Latin for 'rolled back', and it here refers to the margins or apex.

== Taxonomy ==
The type locality is from the Ruahine Range, and were collected by Collenso.

Many different forms of Euphrasia were formerly classified under this species-name, but the modern convention is to determine the genus as speciose, and to limit this species to the area near the type specimen. The long pedicels and glandular-hairy calyx separate this species from Euphrasia townsonii, for instance, which is found in Nelson.
