= Euphrasia crassiuscula =

Scientific classification
- Kingdom: Plantae
- Clade: Embryophytes
- Clade: Tracheophytes
- Clade: Spermatophytes
- Clade: Angiosperms
- Clade: Eudicots
- Clade: Asterids
- Order: Lamiales
- Family: Orobanchaceae
- Genus: Euphrasia
- Species: E. crassiuscula

Binomial name
- Euphrasia crassiuscula Gand.

Species of flowering plant in the broomrape family

Euphrasia crassiuscula is a perennial herb in the genus Euphrasia. It is endemic to the Victorian Alps in Australia. The species was formally described by French botanist Michel Gandoger based on plant material collected by Carl Walter. Three subspecies are currently recognised:

- E. crassiuscula Gand. subsp. crassiuscula
- E. crassiuscula subsp. eglandulosa (J.H.Willis) W.R.Barker
- E. crassiuscula subsp. glandulifera W.R.Barker – thick eyebright, listed as "vulnerable" under the Commonwealth

Environment Protection and Biodiversity Conservation Act 1999.
