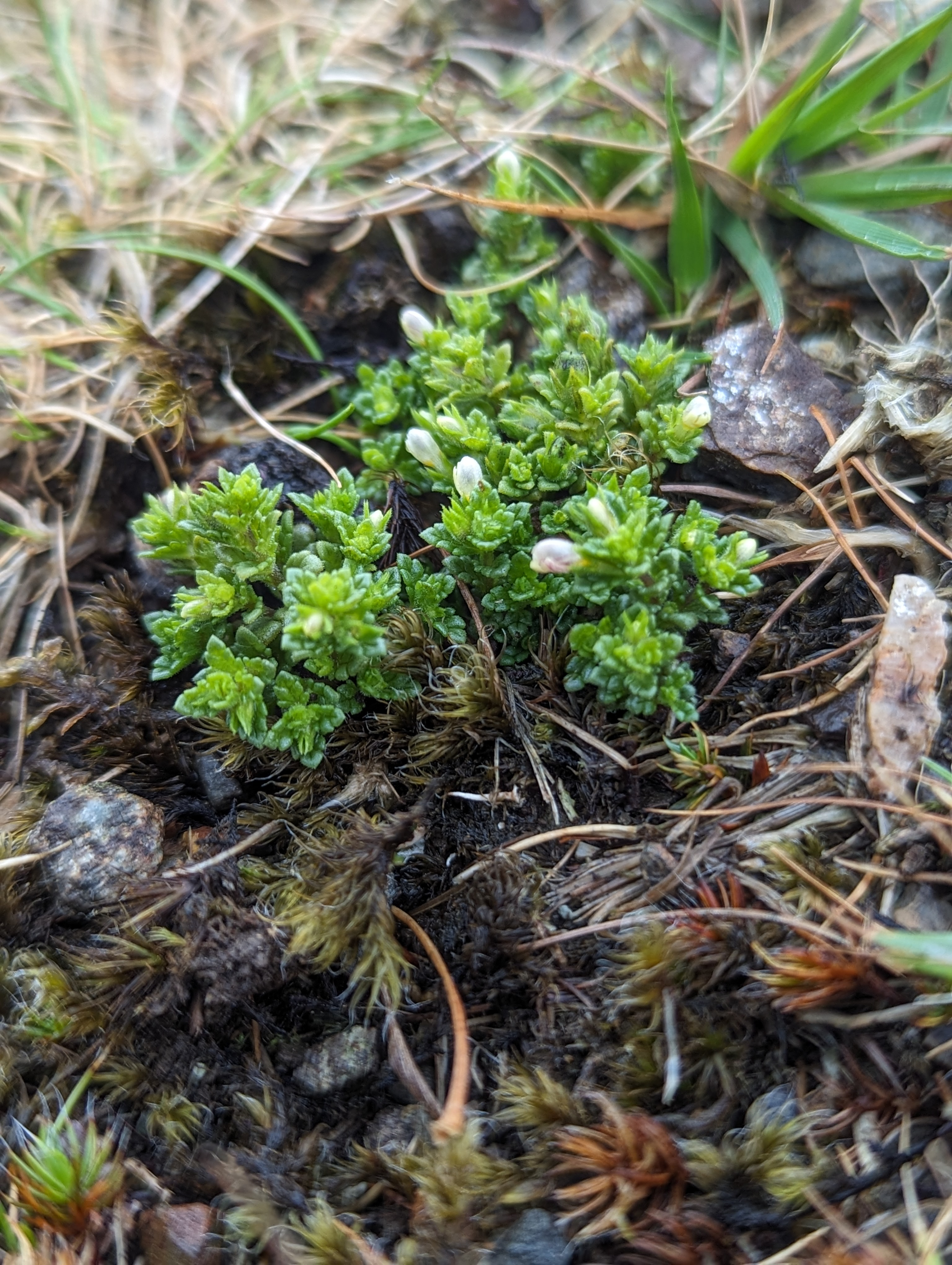

Scientific classification
- Kingdom: Plantae
- Clade: Embryophytes
- Clade: Tracheophytes
- Clade: Spermatophytes
- Clade: Angiosperms
- Clade: Eudicots
- Clade: Asterids
- Order: Lamiales
- Family: Orobanchaceae
- Genus: Euphrasia
- Species: E. cambrica

Binomial name
- Euphrasia cambrica Pugsley

= Euphrasia cambrica =

Species of flowering plant in the broomrape family

Euphrasia cambrica, commonly called the Welsh eyebright, is a plant from the genus Euphrasia, in the family Orobanchaceae. It is endemic to North Wales where it occurs on mountains in the vice-counties of Caernarfonshire and Merionethshire.
