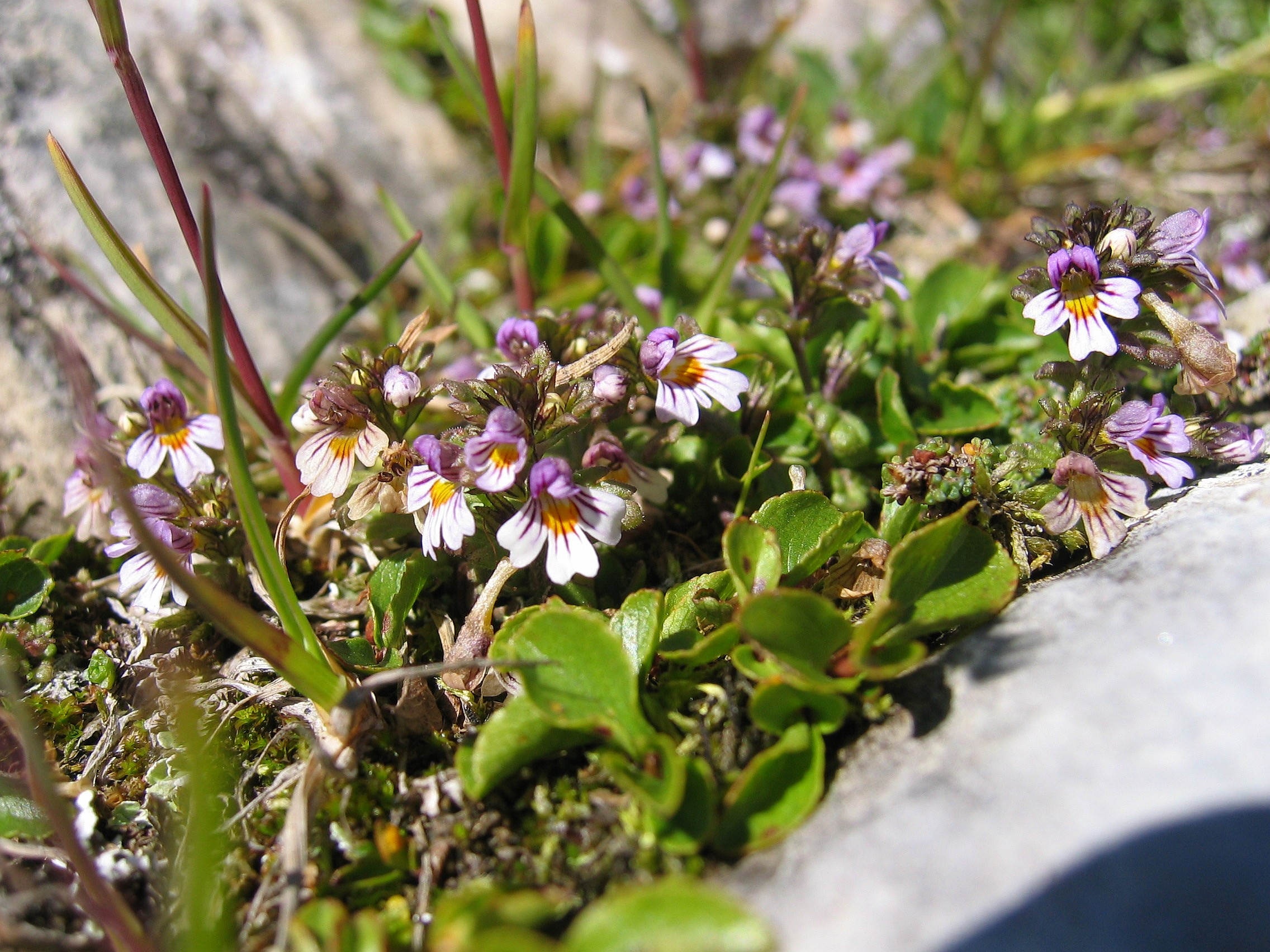

Scientific classification
- Kingdom: Plantae
- Clade: Embryophytes
- Clade: Tracheophytes
- Clade: Spermatophytes
- Clade: Angiosperms
- Clade: Eudicots
- Clade: Asterids
- Order: Lamiales
- Family: Orobanchaceae
- Genus: Euphrasia
- Species: E. minima

Binomial name
- Euphrasia minima Jacq. ex DC.

= Euphrasia minima =

Species of flowering plant in the broomrape family

Euphrasia minima is a plant from the genus Euphrasia, in the family Orobanchaceae. It is native to central and southern Europe where it is found in mountainous, humid areas from the Iberian Peninsula, through the Apennine Mountains to the Balkans. It is thought to be regionally extinct in Portugal.
