= Euphrasia ruptura =

Conservation status
- Extinct (EPBC Act)

Scientific classification
- Kingdom: Plantae
- Clade: Embryophytes
- Clade: Tracheophytes
- Clade: Spermatophytes
- Clade: Angiosperms
- Clade: Eudicots
- Clade: Asterids
- Order: Lamiales
- Family: Orobanchaceae
- Genus: Euphrasia
- Species: †E. ruptura

Binomial name
- †Euphrasia ruptura W.R.Barker

Synonyms
- Euphrasia sp. Tamworth

Species of flowering plant in the broomrape family

Euphrasia ruptura (former synonym: Euphrasia sp. Tamworth) is a presumed extinct plant from the genus Euphrasia within the family Orobanchaceae.

It was first described in 1997 by William R. Barker from a single collection made in the Tamworth Area, Northern Tablelands, New South Wales in 1904. It is named after the Australian botanist Herman Montague Rucker Rupp who discovered this species.

== Description ==
This perennial subshrub reaches a height of at least 26 centimetres (10 in). The branchlets are covered with hair and have 22 to 25 leave pairs. The length of the calyx reaches from 3.8 to 4.5 millimetres. The corolla measures from 8 to 10.8 millimetres. The color is unknown. The tube is about five millimetres long and the stamens with the anthers 0.9 x 1.7 millimetres.

== Status ==
This plant is only known from two flowering branches collected in September 1904 in the North Western Slopes near Tamworth.
