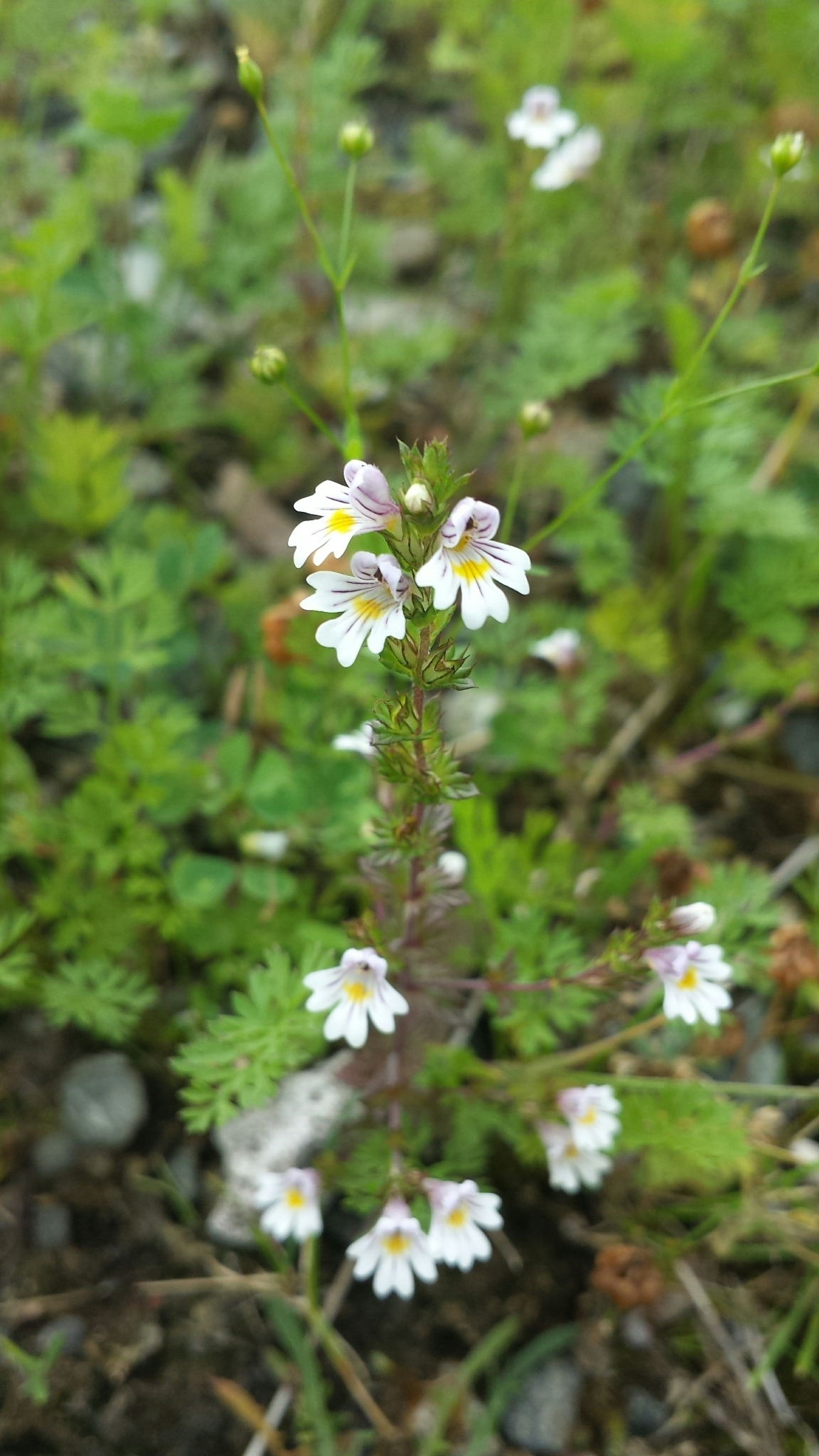

Scientific classification
- Kingdom: Plantae
- Clade: Tracheophytes
- Clade: Angiosperms
- Clade: Eudicots
- Clade: Asterids
- Order: Lamiales
- Family: Orobanchaceae
- Genus: Euphrasia
- Species: E. nemorosa

Binomial name
- Euphrasia nemorosa (Pers.) Wallr.

Synonyms
- Euphrasia officinalis subsp. nemorosa (Pers.) Čelak.; Euphrasia officinalis var. nemorosa Pers.; Euphrasia officinalis var. parviflora Wallr.; Euphrasia officinalis var. curta Fr.

= Euphrasia nemorosa =

Species of flowering plant

Euphrasia nemorosa, the common eyebright, is a hemiparasitic, annual species of flowering plant in the family Orobanchaceae. It is native to Europe and has been introduced to North America and New Zealand. It is the commonest species of Euphrasia in Britain and Ireland.
