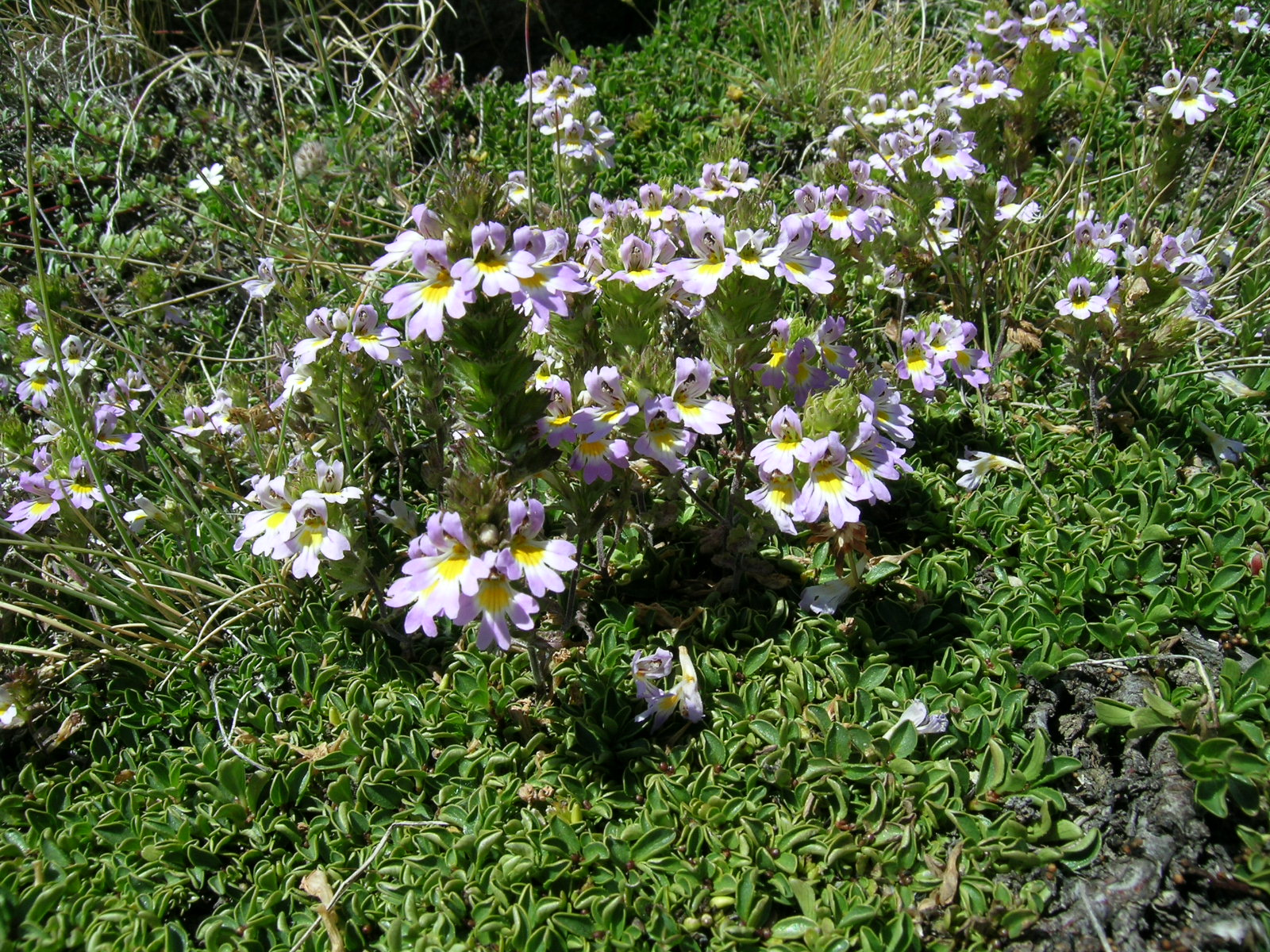

Scientific classification
- Kingdom: Plantae
- Clade: Tracheophytes
- Clade: Angiosperms
- Clade: Eudicots
- Clade: Asterids
- Order: Lamiales
- Family: Orobanchaceae
- Genus: Euphrasia
- Species: E. alpina

Binomial name
- Euphrasia alpina Lamarck (1783)

= Euphrasia alpina =

Species of flowering plant in the broomrape family

Euphrasia alpina is a plant from the genus Euphrasia, in the family Orobanchaceae. Three subspecies are recognized: E. a. alpina, E. a cantabrica, E. a. pulchra. Like all Euphrasia species, E. alpina is hemiparasitic.

== Distribution ==
E. alpina is native to France, Spain, Switzerland, and Italy.
