= Euphrasia semipicta =

Scientific classification
- Kingdom: Plantae
- Clade: Embryophytes
- Clade: Tracheophytes
- Clade: Spermatophytes
- Clade: Angiosperms
- Clade: Eudicots
- Clade: Asterids
- Order: Lamiales
- Family: Orobanchaceae
- Genus: Euphrasia
- Species: E. semipicta

Binomial name
- Euphrasia semipicta W.R.Barker

Species of flowering plant

Euphrasia semipicta, commonly known as the Peninsular eyebright, flowering plant endemic to the Tasman Peninsula in south-eastern Tasmania/ luturwita.

== Description ==
This species is a short lived annual to perennial herb. Its height is usually below 35 cm (14 in). Its stems are erect, branching above ground level. Its leaves are alternating opposite pairs, 5–10 mm (0.20–0.39 in) long and 3–5 mm (0.12–0.20 in) wide, appear semi-succulent with obvious deep venations with no more than 6 teeth per leaf, underside of leaf with characteristic patches of glands typical to most eyebrights, green to reddish in colour. Its flowers are in racemes situated at the end of branches, racemes with 5–10 pairs of flowers arranged in alternating opposite pairs, floral bracts similar to leaves. Individual flowers are hooded with three lobed lower lips, lower lips larger than upper. White, pink or purple in colour, often purple lines extending from throat, occasionally yellow spot on the inside of the lower lobes, flowering early spring, seasonally dependant autumn flowering. The fruit is a capsule 6–8 mm (0.24–0.31 in) long, slightly flattened.

== Naming ==
Greek Euphrasia (delight, good cheer) referring to its common use as a herbal remedy from eye related ailments. Latin semi (half) and pictus (brightly marked, painted) refers to the bright purple lines extending from the throat of the flower, but indicating the lines are not seen as prominently as on other species.

== Life history ==
Euphrasia semipicta has an annual to relatively short lived (up to 5yr) perennial life cycle. Following reproductive activity, new growth is rarely stimulated and have a high mortality rate. For this reason, successful seedling recruitment is required for the population to persist. Exposure to light is the major requirement for Euphrasia seedlings to germinate. Ground lacking overhead canopy or open field conditions are preferential for recruitment.

Germination occurs in the late winter to early spring. Seeds require a period of cooling and adequate dampening prior to and post germination. Stronger germination events have been linked to unusually wet spring periods. Large germination events have been recorded following fire, indicating that germination may be linked to cues additional to the seeds exposure to light.

Low seed dispersal potential (majority of seeds spread within 30 cm of parental plant) combined with copious seed production suggests seeds may lie dormant in the soil for extended periods of time prior to germination.

== Distribution and habitat ==
The eyebrights distribution is limited to a few known populations, all located on the eastern side of the Tasman Peninsular, south-east Tasmania / Lutruwita. Populations are transient and current distribution information may not be representative of extant populations. Historically the Euphrasia have been located in 5 populations on the Peninsular. The extreme endemism of this species is likely due to its poor dispersion and disturbance reliant lifecycle.

Habitat consists of coastal heathy-woodlands and heathlands. Prefer low sparse vegetation, hence their abundance along the edges of cleared tracks and trails. Euphrasia semipicta is highly adapted to disturbance and will favour germination and recruitment following disturbance event such as fire or earth movement. Distribution within these habitats is limited by availability of light and open patches.

== Ecology ==
Euphrasia species are hemi-parasites. Hemi-parasitism allows the plant to acquire nutrient and/or water from the host plant whilst still being capable of photosynthesis. Parasitic connection is made though specialised roots called haustorium. Euphrasia are non-obligate/ facultative parasite does not require a host in order to complete its life cycle, but given the chance will parasitise. Growth and reproduction rate is greatly reduced in the absence of a host. Euphrasia are non-host specific.

== Conservation ==
Euphrasia semipicta is currently listed as ‘Endangered’ under the EPBC Act 1999 and TSP Act 1995. Disturbance required to stimulate recruitment makes inadequate or inappropriate fire/ disturbance regimes problematic if unable to sufficiently aid germination. The parasitic nature of the plant makes it indirectly susceptible to additional ecosystem threats affecting surrounding plant species (specifically Phytophthora) in heathland.
