= Euphrasia striata =

Scientific classification
- Kingdom: Plantae
- Clade: Tracheophytes
- Clade: Angiosperms
- Clade: Eudicots
- Clade: Asterids
- Order: Lamiales
- Family: Orobanchaceae
- Genus: Euphrasia
- Species: E. striata

Binomial name
- Euphrasia striata R.Br.

Species of plant

Euphrasia striata, commonly known as ‘shiny striped eyebright’ is an endemic Tasmanian species, which is a member of the Scrophulariaceae family. The distinctive purple striations on the petals, from which the name was derived, are characteristic of the species.

== Taxonomy ==
The genus Euphrasia of the family Scrophulariaceae consists of semi-parasitic annual and perennial herbs and small shrubs. Euphrasia occur extensively in temperate regions across the globe, with twenty-two species found in Australia, all of which are endemic. Euphrasia is a prominent genus within the native flora of Tasmania and is relatively diverse across its nine native species

== Description ==
Euphrasia striata is a short, perennial herb which is unbranched above ground. It generally ranges from 5 – 20 cm in height and has a width of 20 – 30 cm. Its leaves (measuring up to 9mm in length) are glossy, fleshy, opposite, widest at the top, prominently lobed with a pointed apex green and brownish purple in colour. Flowers have white petals with three distinctive purple striations, a yellow patch within the throat of the corolla., anthers with a short awn, and are arranged in terminal spikes. Flowering occurs from summer to autumn. Fruit takes the form of a pointed capsule between 4 and 6 mm long

=== Key distinguishing characteristics ===
Key characteristics distinguishing Euphrasia striata from other Euphrasia species:

- Purple striations on petals
- No hairs on the stamens where anthers attach
- Plant not branched above ground

== Habitat and distribution ==
Euphrasia striata is commonly occurring in alpine and sub-alpine areas., especially in the higher altitude grasslands of Tasmania's central and southern highlands

== Ecology ==
Euphrasia striata prefers areas of open alpine habitat, which is maintained through exposure to harsh conditions such as strong winds and low temperatures. This habitat preference is explained by the requirement of light for seed germination. Euphrasia striata is semi-parasitic, forming a non-specific relationship with hosts during seedling establishment. This semi-parasitic nature helps the species survive the harsh conditions it often inhabits.
