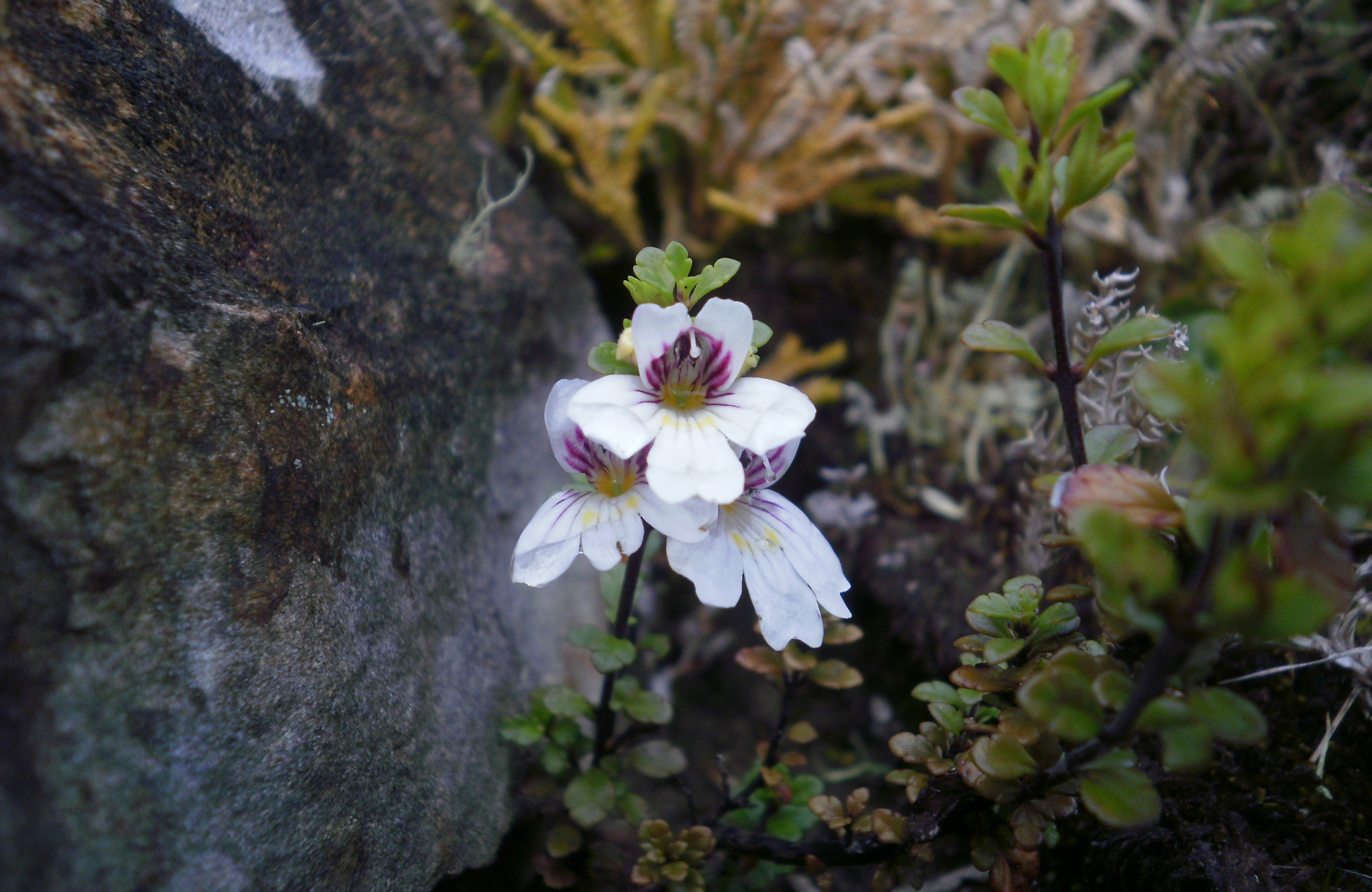

Conservation status
- Not Threatened (NZ TCS)

Scientific classification
- Kingdom: Plantae
- Clade: Tracheophytes
- Clade: Angiosperms
- Clade: Eudicots
- Clade: Asterids
- Order: Lamiales
- Family: Orobanchaceae
- Genus: Euphrasia
- Species: E. cuneata

Binomial name
- Euphrasia cuneata G.Forst.

= Euphrasia cuneata =

Species of flowering plant in the broomrape family

Euphrasia cuneata, or North Island eyebright, is a perennial herb or subshrub in the genus Euphrasia, native to New Zealand. It grows to 60 centimetres (24 inches), with woody stems and white flowers with a yellow lower lip.

== Taxonomy and etymology ==
The species was first described by Georg Forster in 1876. The genus name Euphrasia derives from Greek, and means joy, or delight. The specific epithet cuneata is from the Latin cuneum or ‘wedge’, referring to the wedge-shaped leaves. The common name eyebright refers to the use of plants in the Euphrasia genus for therapeutic purposes.

== Description ==
E. cuneata is a perennial herb or shrub-like plant up to 60 cm (24 in) tall. Plants have variable leaf-shape, flower size and colour. Stems may be simple to very branched, the surfaces with, or without hairs. Leaves have a short leaf-stem and are variable in arrangement, occurring in pairs, clusters or produced on short branchlets. The leaf form is somewhat variable; ‘cuneata’ refers to ‘wedge-shape’ angle of the leaf blade at its base, and leaves have a lobe-shaped tip. There are a variable number of blunt teeth on the leaf margins and leaves are hairless.

Flowers with short flower-stems are borne in clusters or on short racemes originating in leaf axils. The calyx is 4-8 mm long, bell-shaped and four-lobed, the lobes may be rounded or pointed and lobes divided up to half the length of the calyx. The corolla is most often described as white, although Hooker (1844) describes the colour as pink, purplish or yellowish. It is funnel-shaped, opening out to an upper and lower lip which are also lobed, with the lower lip longer than the upper. Anthers are reddish-brown, hairy, two lobed, with those of the lower-most anthers much longer. The seed capsule is much longer than the calyx once mature, narrowly oblong with tapered ends, and with dense bristles at the tip. The seeds are approximately 2 mm long.

== Distribution ==
E. cuneata is endemic to New Zealand. It is found primarily in northern New Zealand, from East Cape, the easternmost point of the North Island, to the north-easternmost point of the South Island, the Marlborough Sounds. However, E. cuneata can be found as far south as Lake Ellesmere / Te Waihora in Canterbury. It grows from the coast up to subalpine areas at altitudes of up to 1,500 m (4,900 ft) in "open rocky places, stream-sides and among scrub."

== Conservation status ==
E. cuneata was listed as Not Threatened in the 2023 New Zealand Threat Classification Series for vascular plants.

== Sources cited ==
- Forster, G. (1786), Florulae Insularum Australium Prodromus (in Latin), Joann. Christian Dietrich, doi:10.5962/BHL.TITLE.10725, OCLC 14828994, OL 25471263M, Wikidata Q5863258
- Hooker, J.D. (1844), The botany of the Antarctic voyage of H.M. discovery ships Erebus and Terror in the Years 1839-1843 under the command of Captain Sir James Clark Ross, Illustrator: Walter Hood Fitch, doi:10.5962/BHL.TITLE.16029, OCLC 38878765, Wikidata Q6435950
- Allan, H.H. (1963). "Flora of New Zealand. vol. I: Indigenous Tracheophyta: Psilopsida, Lycopsida, Filicopsida, Gymnospermae, Dicotyledones by H. H. Allan". Madroño. 17 (2): 66–68. ISSN 0024-9637. JSTOR 41431639. Wikidata Q93957457.
- Webb, C.; Sykes, W.R.; Garnock-Jones, P. (1988), Flora of New Zealand Volume IV, Manaaki Whenua – Landcare Research, Wikidata Q134194200
