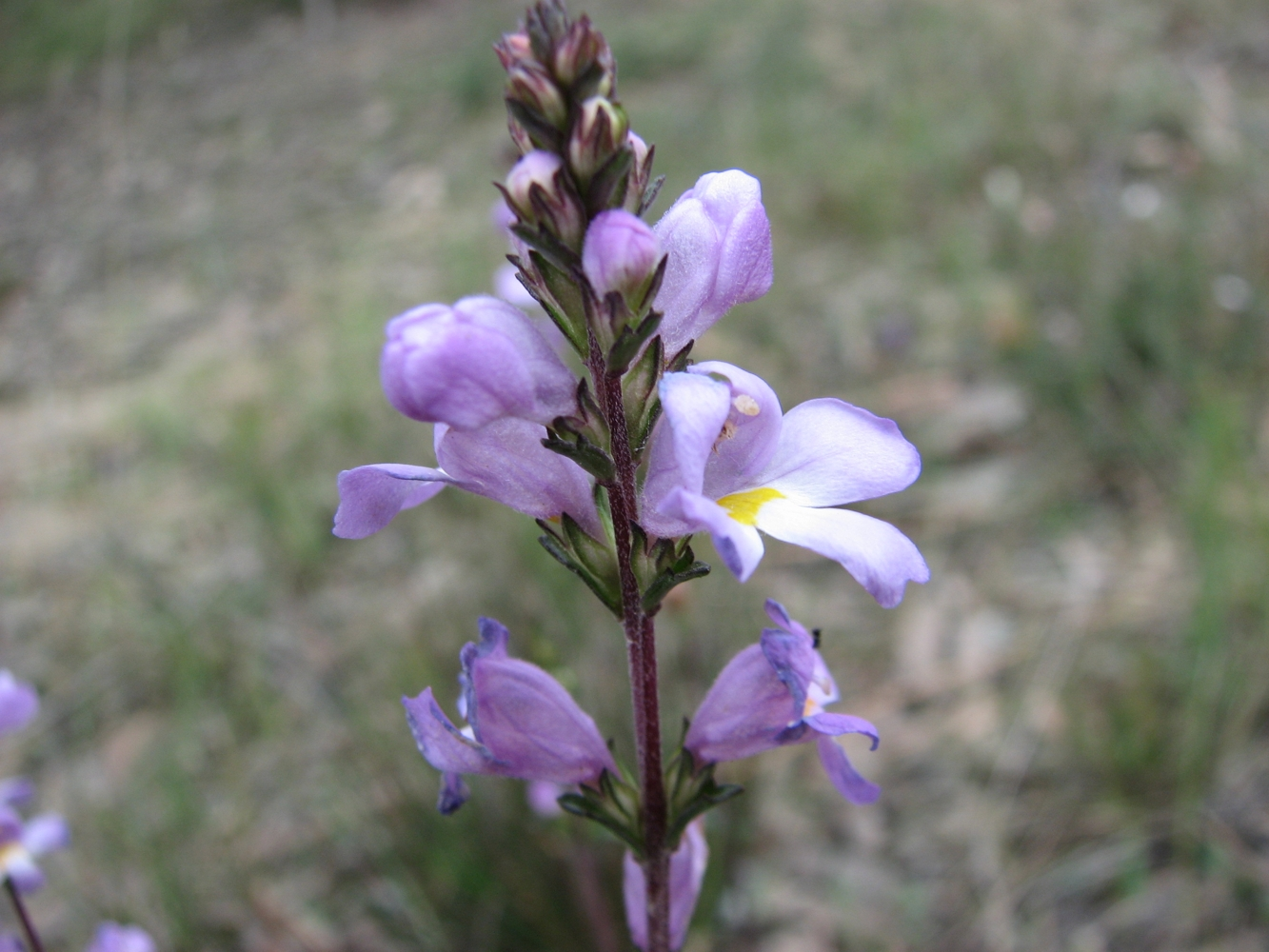
- Euphrasia collina subsp. collina in Bunyip State Park

Scientific classification
- Kingdom: Plantae
- Clade: Embryophytes
- Clade: Tracheophytes
- Clade: Spermatophytes
- Clade: Angiosperms
- Clade: Eudicots
- Clade: Asterids
- Order: Lamiales
- Family: Orobanchaceae
- Genus: Euphrasia
- Species: E. collina

Binomial name
- Euphrasia collina R.Br.

Synonyms
- Euphrasia alpina var. angustifolia Benth.; Euphrasia brownii var. collina (R.Br.) Maiden & Betche; Euphrasia tasmanica Gand.

= Euphrasia collina =

Species of flowering plant in the broomrape family

Euphrasia collina is a perennial herb or subshrub in the genus Euphrasia. Plants grow between 5 and 60 cm (2.0 and 24 in) high and have leaves with 1 to 6 teeth per side. The flowers may be white, blue, pink or purple, sometimes blotched with yellow on the lower petal.

It occurs in South Australia, Victoria, Tasmania and New South Wales, and it has a wide variety of habitats including woodland, heath and grasslands, from coastal to alpine areas.

== Taxonomy ==
The species was first formerly described by botanist Robert Brown in Prodromus Florae Novae Hollandiae in 1810. There are a number of subspecies currently recognised:

- Euphrasia collina R.Br. subsp. collina
- Euphrasia collina subsp. diemenica (Spreng.) W.R.Barker
- Euphrasia collina subsp. diversicolor W.R.Barker
- Euphrasia collina subsp. glacialis (Wettst.) W.R.Barker
- Euphrasia collina subsp. gunnii (Du Rietz) W.R.Barker
- Euphrasia collina subsp. lapidosa W.R.Barker
- Euphrasia collina subsp. muelleri (Wettst.) W.R.Barker
- Euphrasia collina subsp. nandewarensis W.R.Barker
- Euphrasia collina subsp. osbornii W.R.Barker
- Euphrasia collina subsp. paludosa (R.Br.) W.R.Barker
- Euphrasia collina subsp. speciosa (R.Br.) W.R.Barker
- Euphrasia collina subsp. tetragona (R.Br.) W.R.Barker
- Euphrasia collina subsp. trichocalycina (Gand.) W.R.Barker
