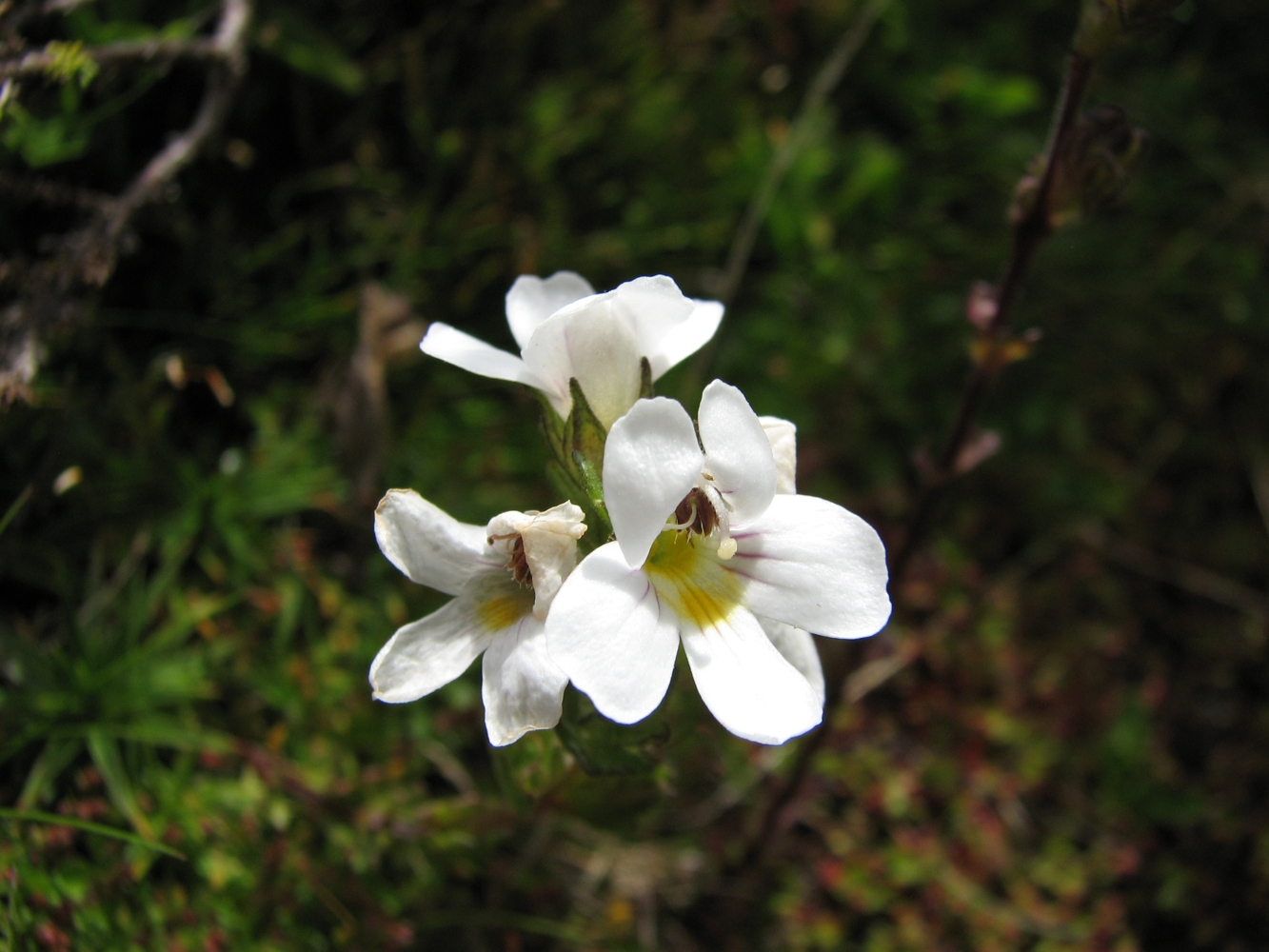
- Euphrasia gibbsiae subsp. subglabrifolia, Baw Baw National Park, Victoria

Scientific classification
- Kingdom: Plantae
- Clade: Tracheophytes
- Clade: Angiosperms
- Clade: Eudicots
- Clade: Asterids
- Order: Lamiales
- Family: Orobanchaceae
- Genus: Euphrasia
- Species: E. gibbsiae

Binomial name
- Euphrasia gibbsiae Du Rietz

= Euphrasia gibbsiae =

Species of flowering plant in the broomrape family

Euphrasia gibbsiae is a perennial herbaceous plant in the genus Euphrasia. It is native to Victoria and Tasmania in Australia. Species in this genus may be called eyebright.

Euphrasia gibbsiae was formally described by G.E. Du Rietz in Field Notes of Tasmanian Plants collected by H.F.Comber 1929/30. There are a number of subspecies currently recognised:

- Euphrasia gibbsiae subsp. comberi (Du Rietz) W.R.Barker
- Euphrasia gibbsiae subsp. discolor W.R.Barker - described in 1982 based on the type specimen collected from near Cradle Mountain in Tasmania in 1971.
- Euphrasia gibbsiae Du Rietz subsp. gibbsiae
- Euphrasia gibbsiae subsp. microdonta W.R.Barker - described from plant material collected from Dove Lake near Cradle Mountain.
- Euphrasia gibbsiae subsp. psilantherea (F.Muell.) W.R.Barker
- Euphrasia gibbsiae subsp. pulvinestris W.R.Barker, described in 1982 based on the type specimen collected from Mount Field National Park in Tasmania in 1971.
- Euphrasia gibbsiae subsp. subglabrifolia (Du Rietz) W.R.Barker, described in 1948 based on the type specimen collected from Mount Mueller, Victoria in 1892. It occurs in sphagnum bogs and wet heathland on the Baw Baw plateau in Victoria.
- Euphrasia gibbsiae subsp. wellingtonensis W.R.Barker, described in 1982 based on plant material collected from moorland on the summit of Mount Wellington in Tasmania.
