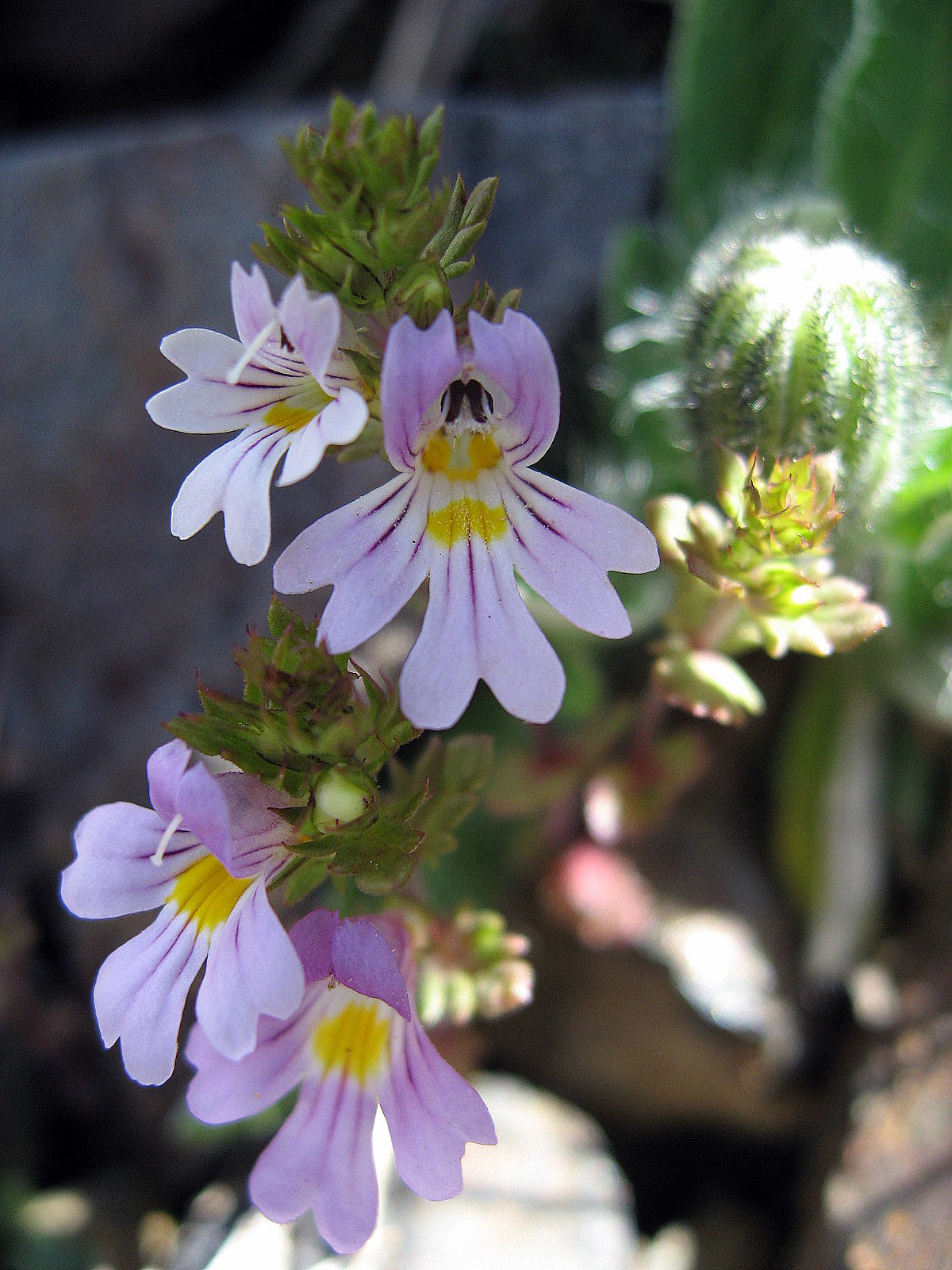

Scientific classification
- Kingdom: Plantae
- Clade: Embryophytes
- Clade: Tracheophytes
- Clade: Spermatophytes
- Clade: Angiosperms
- Clade: Eudicots
- Clade: Asterids
- Order: Lamiales
- Family: Orobanchaceae
- Genus: Euphrasia
- Species: E. salisburgensis

Binomial name
- Euphrasia salisburgensis Funck ex Hoppe

= Euphrasia salisburgensis =

Species of flowering plant in the broomrape family

Euphrasia salisburgensis is a plant in the genus Euphrasia, in the family Orobanchaceae.

== Characteristics and distribution ==
It has a pan-European distribution occurring widely in base-rich sub-alpine areas. The variety hibernica Pugsley has been known in Ireland since the late nineteenth century where it occurs on limestone rocks and sand dunes. It is distinct from the other Irish members of the genus in that it has a glabrous capsule, normally red-brown or bronze coloured foliage and un-contiguous leaf teeth. The subspecies E. s. subsp. schoenicola is endemic to Gotland.

== Ecology ==
As with other Euphrasia species E. salisburgensis is a hemiparasite. Webb & Scannell in their flora of the Burren found that it was closely associated with Thymus praecox and suggest that it may be a specific hemiparasite of this species. The subspecies E. s. subsp. schoenicola is instead thought to be a specific hemiparasite of the sedge Schoenus ferrugineus.
