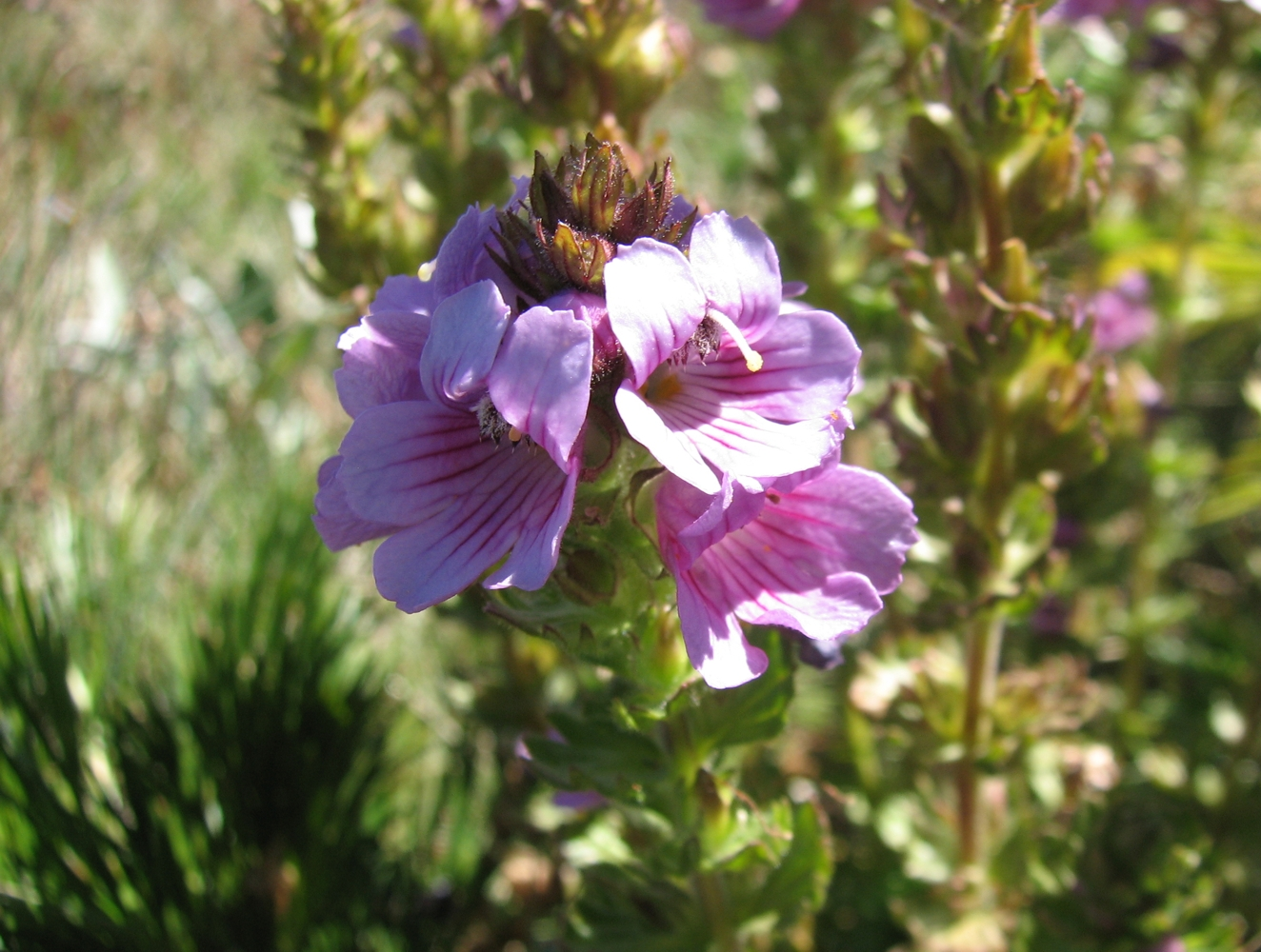

Scientific classification
- Kingdom: Plantae
- Clade: Embryophytes
- Clade: Tracheophytes
- Clade: Spermatophytes
- Clade: Angiosperms
- Clade: Eudicots
- Clade: Asterids
- Order: Lamiales
- Family: Orobanchaceae
- Genus: Euphrasia
- Species: E. lasianthera

Binomial name
- Euphrasia lasianthera W.R.Barker

= Euphrasia lasianthera =

Species of flowering plant in the broomrape family

Euphrasia lasianthera, commonly known as hairy eyebright, is a perennial herb species in the family Orobanchaceae. It is endemic to Victoria, Australia. Plants grow to 30 cm (12 in) high and have leaves with margins that may be smooth or toothed. The flowers may be white, pink or pale purple. The species was first formerly described by botanist W.R. Barker in Journal of the Adelaide Botanic Gardens in 1982. It is listed as "Rare" on the Department of Sustainability and Environment's Advisory List of Rare Or Threatened Plants In Victoria.
