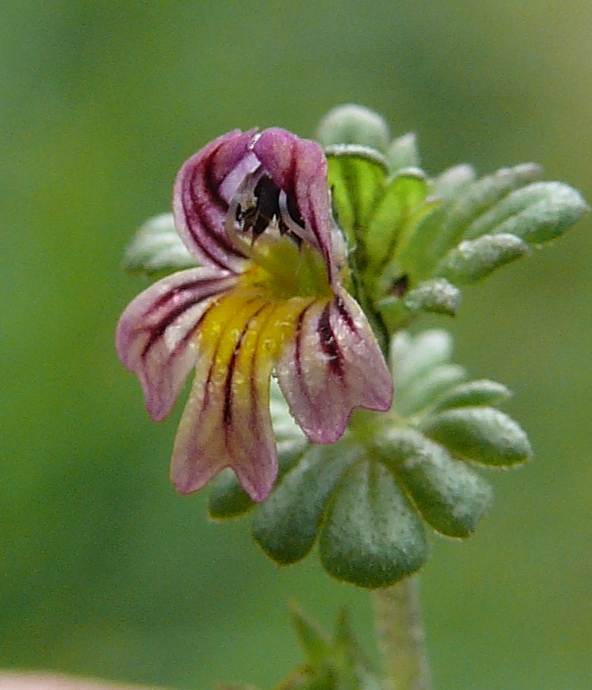

Scientific classification
- Kingdom: Plantae
- Clade: Tracheophytes
- Clade: Angiosperms
- Clade: Eudicots
- Clade: Asterids
- Order: Lamiales
- Family: Orobanchaceae
- Genus: Euphrasia
- Species: E. hirtella

Binomial name
- Euphrasia hirtella Jord. ex Reut.

= Euphrasia hirtella =

Species of flowering plant

Euphrasia hirtella is a species of flowering plant belonging to the family Orobanchaceae.

Euphrasia hirtella has a vast native range through humid mountains ranges in southern Europe, the Caucasus, the Alborz range in northern Iran, an immensely disjunct area in Siberia, and Himalayas east towards Korea.
