= Euphrasia fragosa =

Conservation status
- Critically endangered (EPBC Act)
- Endangered (TSPA)

Scientific classification
- Kingdom: Plantae
- Clade: Tracheophytes
- Clade: Angiosperms
- Clade: Eudicots
- Clade: Asterids
- Order: Lamiales
- Family: Orobanchaceae
- Genus: Euphrasia
- Species: E. fragosa

Binomial name
- Euphrasia fragosa W.R.Barker
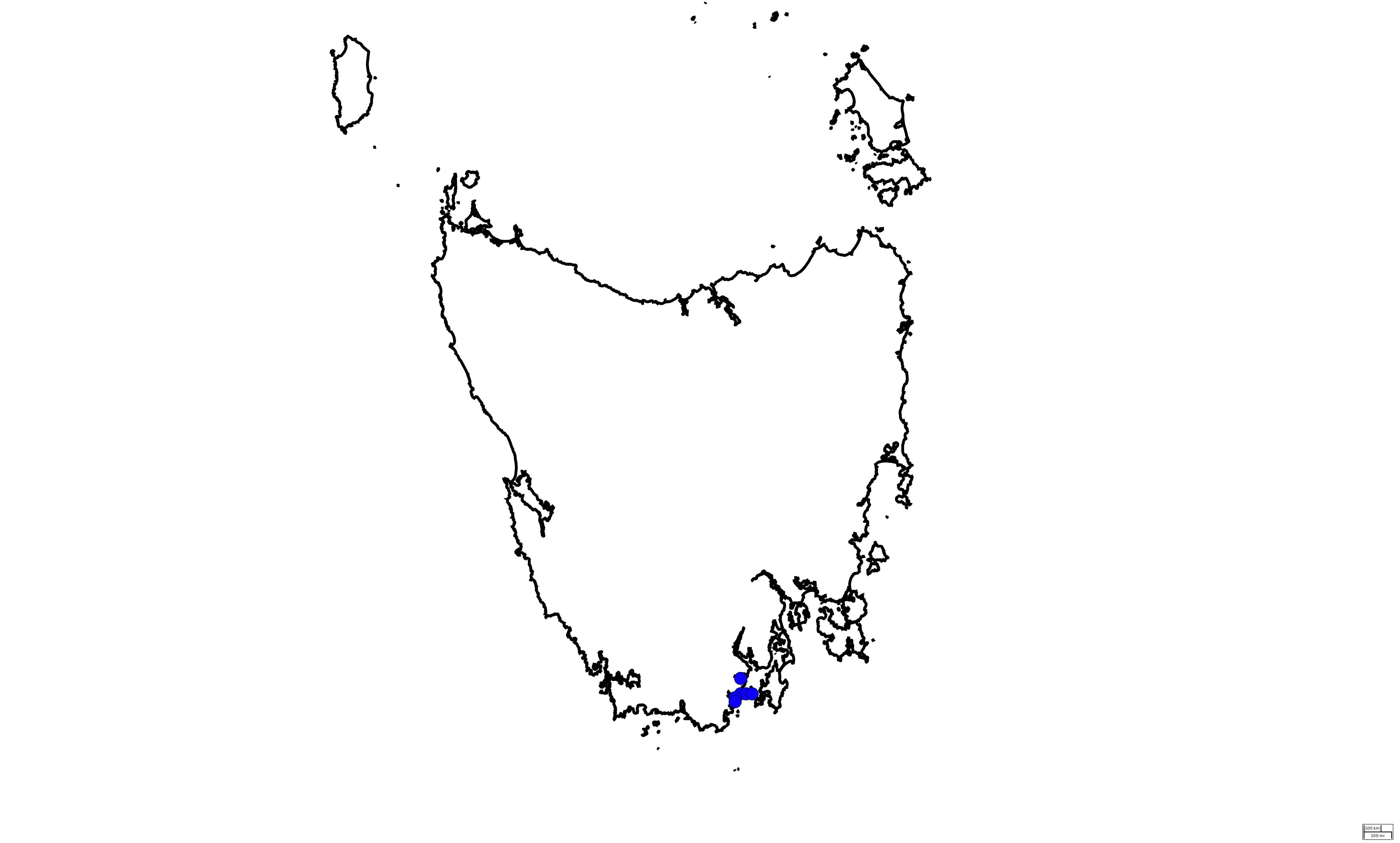
- Distribution of Euphrasia fragosa (map from Atlas of Living Australia)

Species of plant native to Tasmania

Euphrasia fragosa, the shy eyebright, is a rare lowland perennial herb endemic to lutruwita/Tasmania. It is in the family Orobanchaceae

== Description ==
Euphrasia fragosa is a relatively short-lived (1–3 years) perennial herb, growing up to 30 cm (12 in) tall. Leaves are decussate, green with areas sometimes reddened, semi-succulent, 5–10 mm long and 3–5 mm wide. The abaxial surface of the leaves have prominent veins and patches of glands characteristic of most species in the genus Euphrasia. Vein impressions are visible on the adaxial leaf surface. Branches are fragile and slender, with each plant usually bearing up to 10 branches above ground level but may be more.

Inflorescences are in terminal heads of up to 10 pairs of flowers that are around 9mm long and 7mm wide. Flowers are arranged in a decussate manner, consistent with leaf arrangement. The corolla is bilabilate, consisting of 2 fused petals forming an upper hood and 3 fused lower lobed petals. Petals are mauve in colour at the tips, blending to white, with obvious dark purple lines extending down the throat, and a yellowed area below the anthers. The flowers have 4 stamens with the anthers enclosed within the corolla tube. The fruit is a capsule.

Euphrasia fragosa can be distinguished from Euphrasia semipicta by its smaller flowers, that may have an appearance of being half open. Both species have limited distributions that are unlikely to overlap, which may help in differentiating them.

== Life history and ecology ==
Euphrasia fragosa follows a typical r-selection strategy, with a quick generation turnover, producing lots of seeds and being relatively short-lived.

Flowering occurs in November-December but may continue for some months into autumn. Flowers are mainly self-pollinated, with seed release beginning from the end of summer and continuing through autumn. Successful recruitment via seedlings is crucial to population survival due to high mortality rates following fruiting.

Germination typically takes place in late autumn to winter. Germination is reliant on ample light availability and a period of cold stratification. This explains why E. fragosa is found in disturbed areas with low vegetation where there is lots of access to light. The cold period germination requirement ensures that germination occurs when water stress is most likely to be low.

Euphrasia are non-host specific hemiparasitic group of species. Growth rate and seed production is greatly reduced in the absence of a host, but some individuals may persist. Hemiparasitism can influence community dynamics through the reduction in host productivity. However, this may be of benefit to Euphrasia species, by reducing light competition and helping them to meet their light requirements. Hemiparasitism also makes Euphrasia species vulnerable to factors that may affect potential/current hosts in the surrounding vegetation such as Phytophthora cinnamomi.

== Distribution and habitat ==
The distribution of E. fragosa is restricted to three recorded populations (although this may not represent the extant population), all in coastal areas of southern Tasmania. Their distribution is limited by seed dispersal typically only occurring within 30 cm (12 in) of the parent plant.

Euphrasia fragosa grows in open woodlands or along the forest edge where there are available open patches and where soil moisture is high in spring. Germination is most successful after disturbances that create open areas (such as fire and/or human disturbance), hence why the species can be found along walking and vehicle tracks.
