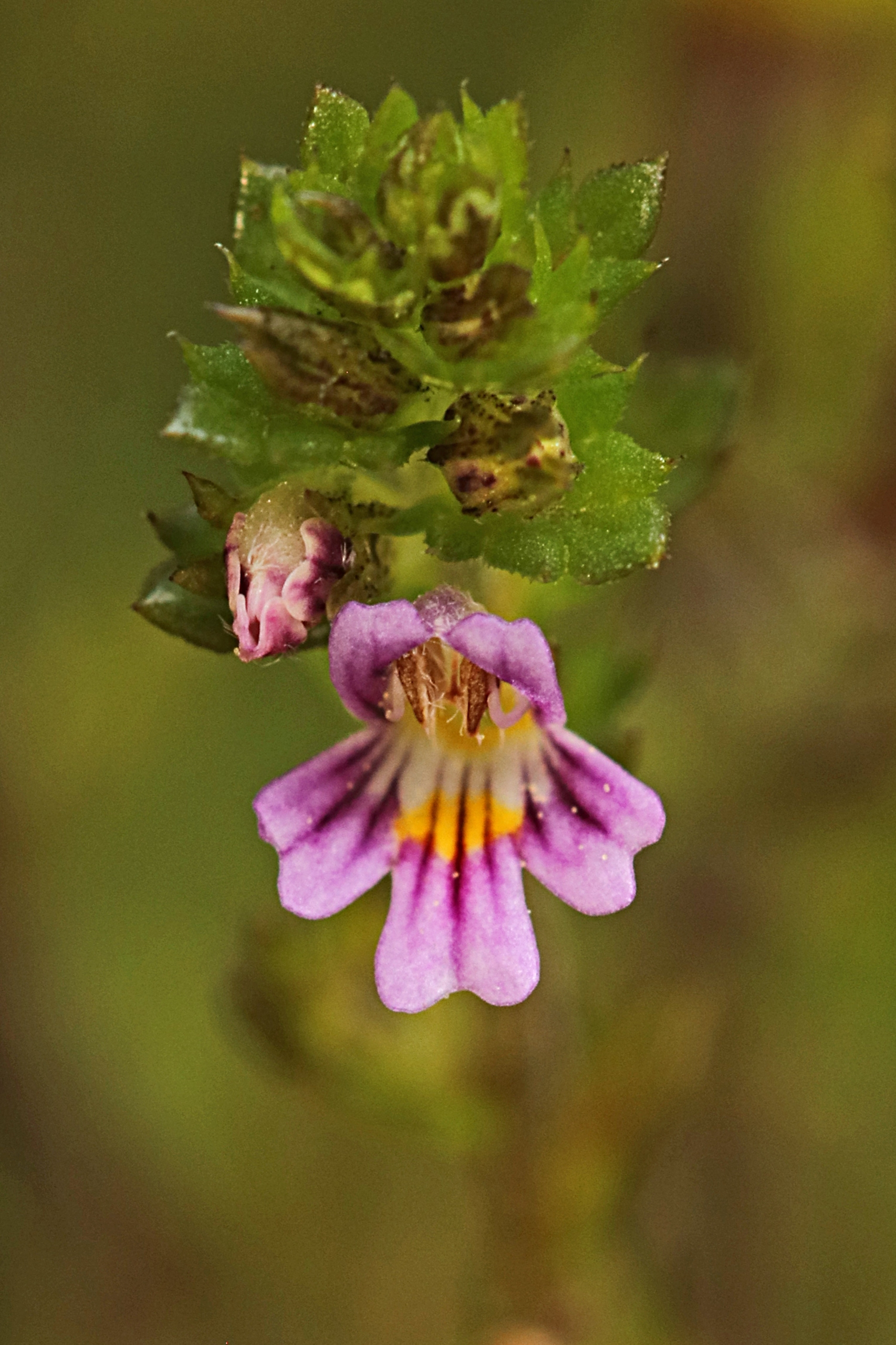

Scientific classification
- Kingdom: Plantae
- Clade: Tracheophytes
- Clade: Angiosperms
- Clade: Eudicots
- Clade: Asterids
- Order: Lamiales
- Family: Orobanchaceae
- Genus: Euphrasia
- Species: E. micrantha

Binomial name
- Euphrasia micrantha Rchb.

= Euphrasia micrantha =

Species of flowering plant

Euphrasia micrantha is a species of flowering plant belonging to the family Orobanchaceae.

Its native range is Europe.

Synonym:

- Euphrasia glabrescens (Wettst.) Wiinst.
