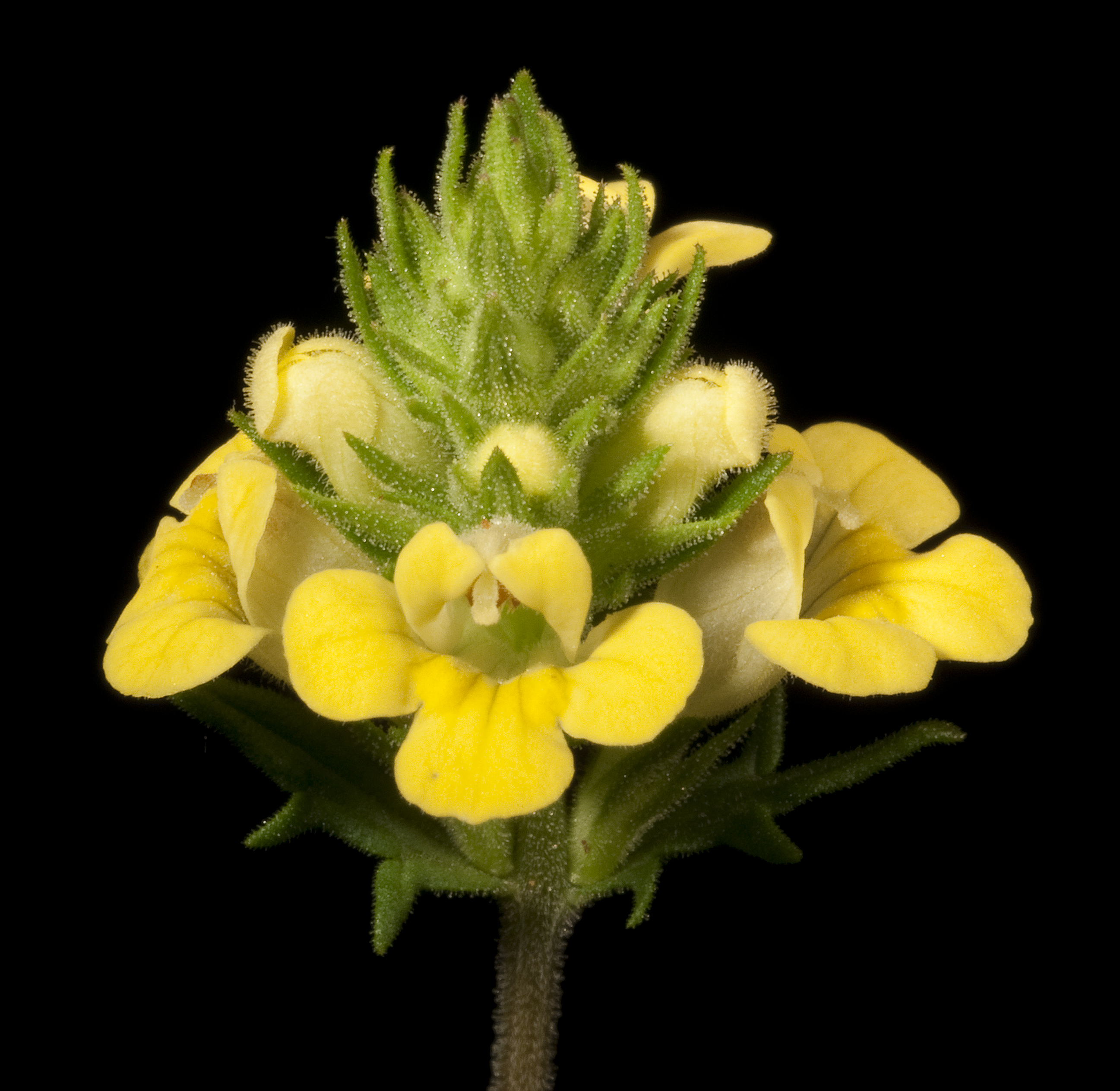

Scientific classification
- Kingdom: Plantae
- Clade: Embryophytes
- Clade: Tracheophytes
- Clade: Spermatophytes
- Clade: Angiosperms
- Clade: Eudicots
- Clade: Asterids
- Order: Lamiales
- Family: Orobanchaceae
- Genus: Euphrasia
- Species: E. scabra

Binomial name
- Euphrasia scabra R.Br.
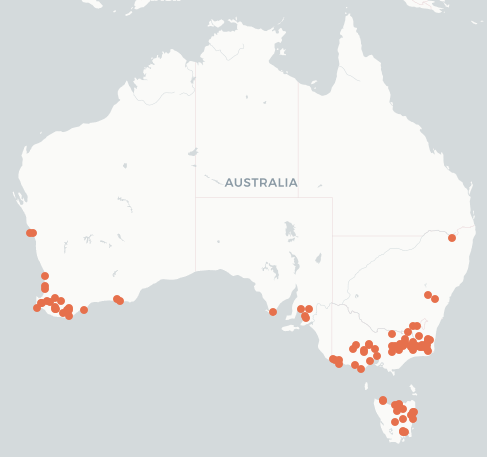
- Map of distribution of Euphrasia scabra from the Atlas of Living Australia.

= Euphrasia scabra =

Species of flowering plant

Euphrasia scabra commonly known as yellow eyebright or rough eyebright, is a flowering plant in the family Orobanchaceae that is endemic to Australia, where it occurs in Tasmania, Victoria, New South Wales, South Australia and Western Australia.

== Description ==
Euphrasia scabra is an erect annual herb that grows between 8.5–50 cm high. It has green leaves, sometimes with reddish parts, that form in opposite and alternate pairs, growing from the stem at right angles from each other.The leaves are ovate to elliptic, 6–20 mm long and 1–9.5 mm wide. Leaf margins vary from pinnatifid to serrate-crenate, with each bearing 1–5 pairs of teeth and the leaf base been rounded-cuneate to truncate.

The stems are reddish-brown and have short, scabrous (rough) white hairs, especially on the upper parts of the plant. The branches develop in consecutive nodes from the stem, with the oldest being just below the inflorescences (flowering structures). The branches end in an inflorescence, consisting of up to 16 pairs of flowers. The species typically flowers between October and February, with the flowers been a creamy yellow colour and 9–12 mm long and 8 mm wide. Capsules are 5–9.3 mm long, bristly except at the base.

== Distribution and habitat ==
Euphrasia scabra is endemic to Australia and is distributed across south-eastern and western Australia. It usually occurs in moist herb and sedge communities, including grassy leads in marshes. It is also found in open, drier grassy areas on hills, often near the headwaters of creeks. Its habitat often occurs where gaps in the vegetation have been created by disturbances such as grazing and flooding. The dispersal range of seeds is very limited, with the vast majority of seeds being deposited within 30 cm of the plant, however flooding events can improve their dispersal.

Euphrasia scabra seeds need light to germinate, therefore areas of open ground are essential for successful germination. Euphrasia scabra also needs a period of low temperatures to germinate. These requirements, along with their small size and fragmented populations increase the species vulnerability to catastrophic events and the risk of local extinctions.

== Threats and conservation ==
Euphrasia scabra is endangered in Tasmania, Victoria, South Australia and New South Wales. In Western Australia the species conservation status is Priority Two, this means that it is a poorly-known species and requires further surveys to determine its conservation status.

The species was formerly widespread but has declined significantly and is now threatened with extinction. This decline is thought to be mainly due to habitat disturbance, with another significant factor being inappropriate disturbance regimes. Climate change is another major risk to the species, particularly because it is an annual and requires areas of high moisture for the seedlings to establish. This problem is further compounded by Euphrasia scabra, having little to no seed dormancy. Together, these factors increase the risk that the species may become extinct if current climate trends continue.

== Taxonomy ==
Euphrasia scabra was first formally described by the Scottish botanist Robert Brown. The generic name (Euphrasia) derives from the Greek word for delight or good cheer. The specific epithet (scabra) comes from the Latin word for rough or scabrous, referring to the rough hairs found on the leaves and stem of the plant.
