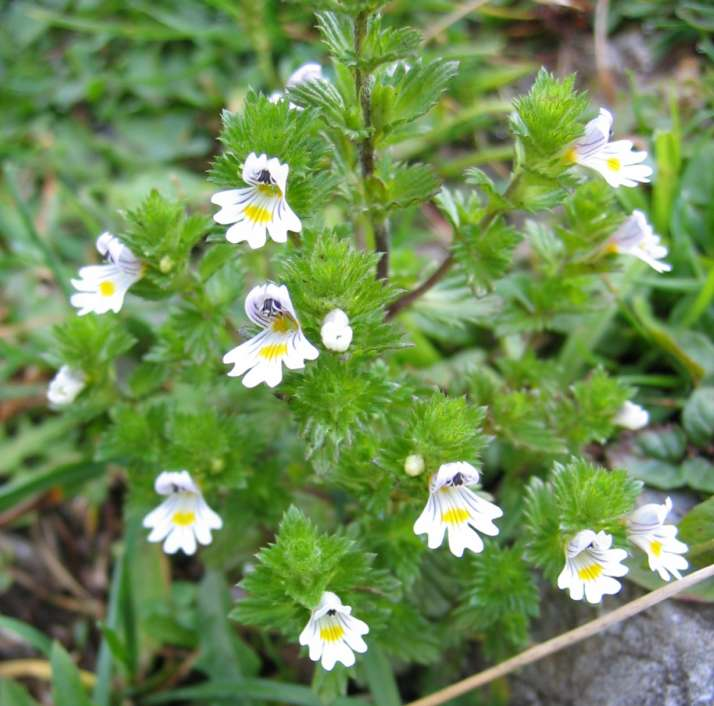

Conservation status
- Least Concern (IUCN 3.1)

Scientific classification
- Kingdom: Plantae
- Clade: Tracheophytes
- Clade: Angiosperms
- Clade: Eudicots
- Clade: Asterids
- Order: Lamiales
- Family: Orobanchaceae
- Genus: Euphrasia
- Species: E. officinalis

Binomial name
- Euphrasia officinalis L.

Subspecies
- Euphrasia officinalis subsp. anglica (Pugsley) Silverside; Euphrasia officinalis subsp. campestris (Jord.) Kerguélen & Lambinon; Euphrasia officinalis subsp. monticola Silverside; Euphrasia officinalis subsp. officinalis; Euphrasia officinalis subsp. pratensis Fr.

Synonyms
- Synonymy: Euphrasia officinalis subsp. major Ehrh. synonyms of subsp. anglica: Euphrasia anglica Pugsley synonyms of subsp. campestris: Euphrasia campestris Jord.; Euphrasia officinalis var. campestris (Jord.) Corb.; Euphrasia rostkoviana var. campestris (Jord.) Rouy; Euphrasia rostkoviana subsp. campestris (Jord.) Hayek; Euphrasia rostkoviana subvar. campestris (Jord.) Hartl synonyms of subsp. monticola: Euphrasia montana Jord.; Euphrasia officinalis subsp. montana (Jord.) Berher, nom. illeg. homonym. post.; Euphrasia rostkoviana var. montana (Jord.) Rouy; Euphrasia rostkoviana subsp. montana (Jord.) Wettst.; Euphrasia rostkoviana subvar. montana (Jord.) Hartl synonyms of subsp. officinalis: Bartsia imbricata Lapeyr.; Euphrasia cantalensis (Chabert) Chabert; Euphrasia fennica Kihlm.; Euphrasia fennica subsp. aestivalis Ganesch.; Euphrasia hirtella var. fennica (Kihlm.) H.Lindb.; Euphrasia hirtella f. macrantha H.Lindb.; Euphrasia nebulosa Chabert; Euphrasia nemorosa var. minima (Lej.) Dumort.; Euphrasia officinalis subvar. foliacea Bréb.; Euphrasia officinalis subvar. gracilis Bréb., nom. illeg. homonym. post.; Euphrasia officinalis var. grandiflora Bréb., nom. illeg. homonym. post.; Euphrasia officinalis var. imbricata (Lapeyr.) W.D.J.Koch; Euphrasia officinalis var. minima Lej.; Euphrasia officinalis subsp. montana Fr.; Euphrasia officinalis f. pygmaea Lange; Euphrasia officinalis subvar. simplex Bréb.; Euphrasia officinalis subvar. tetraquetra Bréb.; Euphrasia praerostkoviana Chitr.; Euphrasia pratensis var. latifolia Lej.; Euphrasia rostkoviana cantalensis Chabert; Euphrasia rostkoviana var. fennica (Kihlm.) Jalas; Euphrasia rostkoviana nebulosa Chabert; Euphrasia saxatilis Schur; Odontites caucasicus K.Koch synonyms of subsp. pratensis: Euphrasia agrestis Arrond.; Euphrasia carniolica A.Kern.; Euphrasia cebennensis B.-A.Martin; Euphrasia cuspidata St.-Lag., nom. illeg. homonym. post.; Euphrasia cuspidatissima St.-Lag.; Euphrasia danica T.Gliem.; Euphrasia exigua Reut.; Euphrasia fennica f. brevidens (H.Lindb. ex Cajander) Hagfors; Euphrasia imbricata Pers.; Euphrasia jordaniana Sennen; Euphrasia lapeyrousei Soy.-Will.; Euphrasia maculata Gilib., opus utique oppr.; Euphrasia minor Link; Euphrasia mollis Ledeb. ex Benth., not validly publ.; Euphrasia nemorosa subsp. cebennensis (B.-A.Martin) P.Fourn.; Euphrasia officinalis var. alpestris Günther, Grab. & Wimm.; Euphrasia officinalis f. brevidens H.Lindb. ex Cajander; Euphrasia officinalis var. flava Gaudin; Euphrasia officinalis var. grandiflora Wallr.; Euphrasia officinalis f. lapponica H.Rosend.; Euphrasia officinalis subsp. minor Ehrh.; Euphrasia officinalis var. minor (Ehrh.) Gaudin; Euphrasia officinalis var. neglecta Wimm. & Grab.; Euphrasia officinalis var. pratensis (Fr.) Wimm. & Grab.; Euphrasia rostkoviana subsp. pratensis (Fr.) Asch. & Graebn.; Euphrasia officinalis var. puberula (Jord.) F.Towns.; Euphrasia officinalis var. purpureocaerulea Gaudin; Euphrasia olympica Halácsy & Sint.; Euphrasia paludosa F.Towns., nom. illeg. homonym. post.; Euphrasia parvula Wettst.; Euphrasia pectinata var. puberula (Jord.) Wettst.; Euphrasia officinalis subsp. rostkoviana (Hayne) F.Towns., nom. superfl.; Euphrasia puberula Jord.; Euphrasia pubibunda Simonk.; Euphrasia pygmaea K.Koch; Euphrasia ramosa Pers.; Euphrasia rostkoviana Hayne; Euphrasia rostkoviana subsp. grandiflora (Wallr.) Dostál; Euphrasia rostkoviana var. jetteri Dörfl.; Euphrasia rostkoviana subsp. kreiselii Rothm. & U.Schneid.; Euphrasia salisburgensis proles soyeri (Timb.-Lagr.) Rouy; Euphrasia sintenisii Halácsy; Euphrasia soyeri Timb.-Lagr.; Euphrasia speciosa A.Kern., nom. illeg. homonym. post.; Euphrasia stricta Beck & Szyszył., nom. illeg. homonym. post.; Euphrasia stricta Schleich., nom. illeg. homonym. post.; Euphrasia stricta var. puberula (Jord.) O.Bolòs & Vigo; Euphrasia subalpina Schur; Euphrasia tatarica var. cebennensis (B.-A.Martin) Rouy; Euphrasia transiens Borbás; Euphrasia uliginosa Ducommun ex Reut.; Euphrasia vulgaris Gueldenst. ex Ledeb.

= Euphrasia officinalis =

Species of flowering plant in the broomrape family

Euphrasia officinalis, known as eyebright or eyewort, is a species of plant in the family Orobanchaceae. It is a hemiparasitic annual plant native to Europe, western Siberia, Turkey, and the Transcaucasus.

Euphrasia officinalis herb has been used in the traditional Austrian medicine internally as tea, or externally as compresses, for treatment of disorders of the eyes and the gastrointestinal tract.

A preliminary study demonstrated protective effects of Euphrasia officinalis against UVB-induced photoaging.

Synonyms of E. officinalis include E. rostkoviana (named after Prussian botanist Friedrich Wilhelm Gottlieb Rostkovius) and E. fennica.
