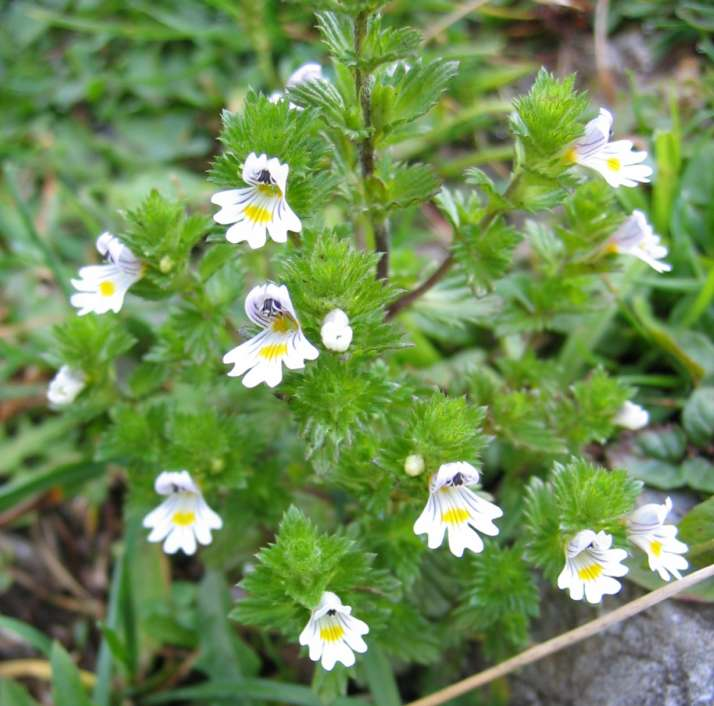
- Euphrasia rostkoviana

Scientific classification
- Kingdom: Plantae
- Clade: Embryophytes
- Clade: Tracheophytes
- Clade: Spermatophytes
- Clade: Angiosperms
- Clade: Eudicots
- Clade: Asterids
- Order: Lamiales
- Family: Orobanchaceae
- Tribe: Rhinantheae
- Genus: Euphrasia; L.

Species
- About 215, see text

Synonyms
- Anagosperma Wettst.; Siphonidium J.B.Armstr.

= Euphrasia =

Genus of plants knowns as eyebrights

Euphrasia, or eyebright, is a genus of about 215 species of herbaceous flowering plants in the family Orobanchaceae (formerly included in the Scrophulariaceae), with a cosmopolitan distribution. They are hemiparasitic on grasses and other plants. Both the common and generic names refer to the plant's use in a lotion for treating eye infections, with Euphrasia literally meaning 'good-cheer'.

Many species are found in alpine or sub-alpine meadows where snow is common. Flowers usually are borne terminally, are zygomorphic, and have a lower petal shaped like a lip. The most common flower colours are purple, blue-white, and violet. Some species have yellow markings on the lower petal to act as a guide to pollinating insects.

Alternative names, mainly in herbalism, are Augentrostkraut, Euphrasiae herba, Herba Euphrasiae and Herbe d'Euphraise.

== Use in herbalism and medicine ==
The plant was known to classical herbalists, but then was not referred to until mentioned again in 1305. Nicholas Culpeper assigned it to the Zodiac sign Leo, claiming that it strengthened the brain. It was also used to treat bad memory and vertigo.

In the Elizabethan era, the plant was used in ales, and Gervase Markham's Countrie Farm (1616) said that one should "Drinke everie morning a small draught of Eyebright wine."

Herbalists use eyebright as a poultice with or without concurrent administration of a tea for the redness, swelling, and visual disturbances caused by blepharitis, and conjunctivitis. The herb is also used for eyestrain and to relieve inflammation caused by colds, coughs, sinus infections, sore throats, and hay fever.

Parts used include the leaf, the stem, and small pieces of the flowers. Typical preparations include a warm compress, or tea. Eyebright preparations are also available as an extract or capsule.

A 2010 report from the European Medicines Agency on the efficacy of Euphrasia remedies states:

From the presence of secondary metabolites, an astringent and anti-inflammatory activity can be hypothesized for Euphrasia preparations. The ocular use of Euphrasia is based upon tradition. However, since the efficacy of the claimed ocular uses is undocumented and external eye application is not hygienic, therapeutic use cannot be recommended.

== Phylogeny ==
The phylogeny of the genera of Rhinantheae has been explored using molecular characters. Euphrasia belongs to the core Rhinantheae. Euphrasia is the sister genus to Odontites, Bellardia, Tozzia, and Hedbergia. In turn, these five genera share phylogenetic affinities with Bartsia.

Genus-level cladogram of tribe Rhinantheae.

- Rhinantheae
  - Melampyrum
  - - - Rhynchocorys
      - - Lathraea
        - Rhinanthus
    - Core Rhinantheae
      - Bartsia sensu stricto (Bartsia alpina)
      - - Euphrasia
        - - Hedbergia
            (including Bartsia decurva + B. longiflora)
          - Tozzia
          - Odontites sensu lato
            (including Bartsiella
            and Bornmuellerantha)
          - - Bellardia
            - - Neobartsia
                (New World Bartsia)
              - Parentucellia

The cladogram has been reconstructed from nuclear and plastid DNA molecular characters (ITS, rps16 intron and trnK region).

== Taxonomy and identification ==
The genus Euphrasia is taxonomically complicated due to many species being interfertile and prone to hybridisation. Despite there having been a number of taxonomic revisions the appropriate rank of many taxa, as well as the relationships between them, remains unclear.

=== Selected species ===
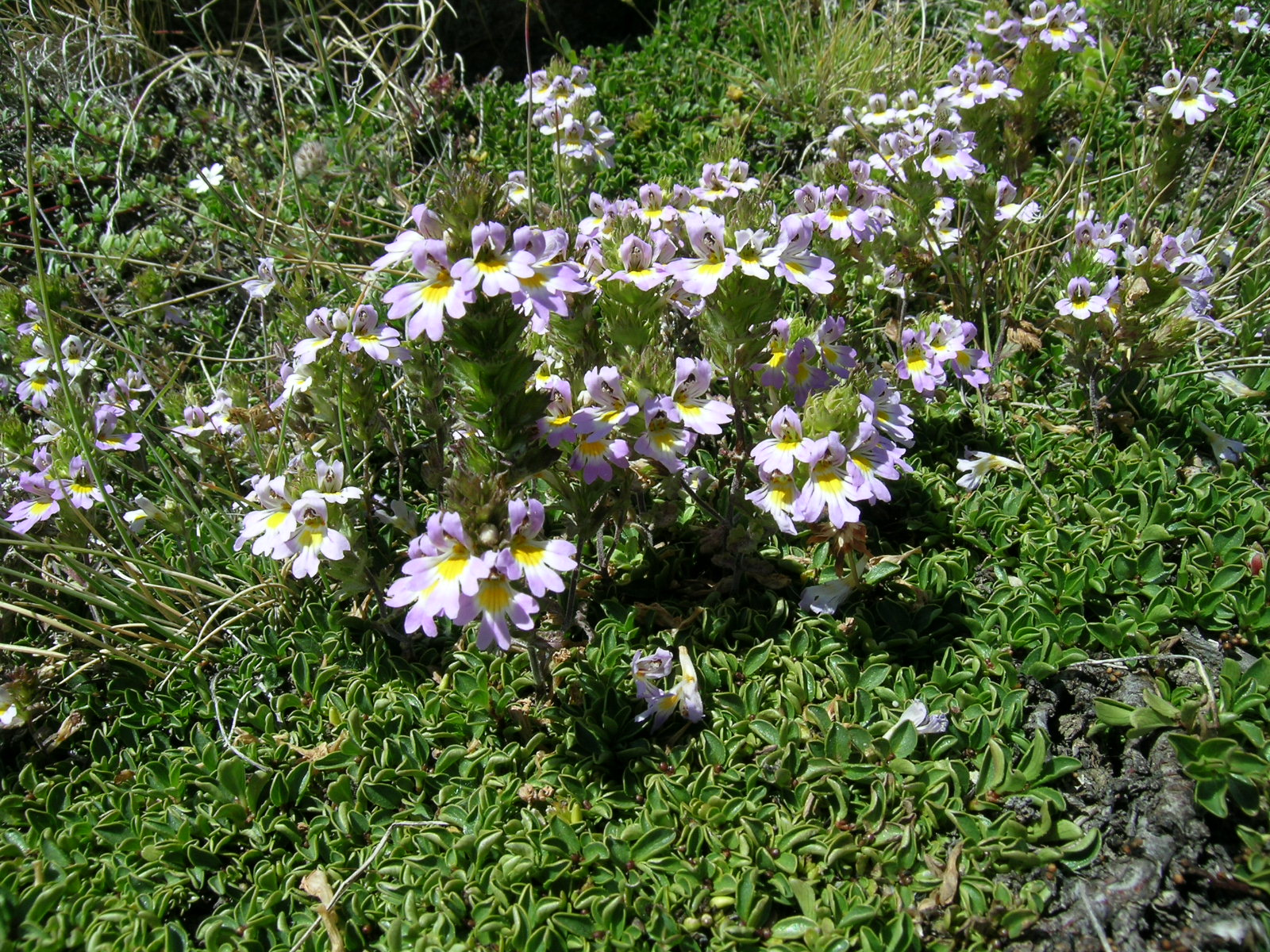
Euphrasia alpina

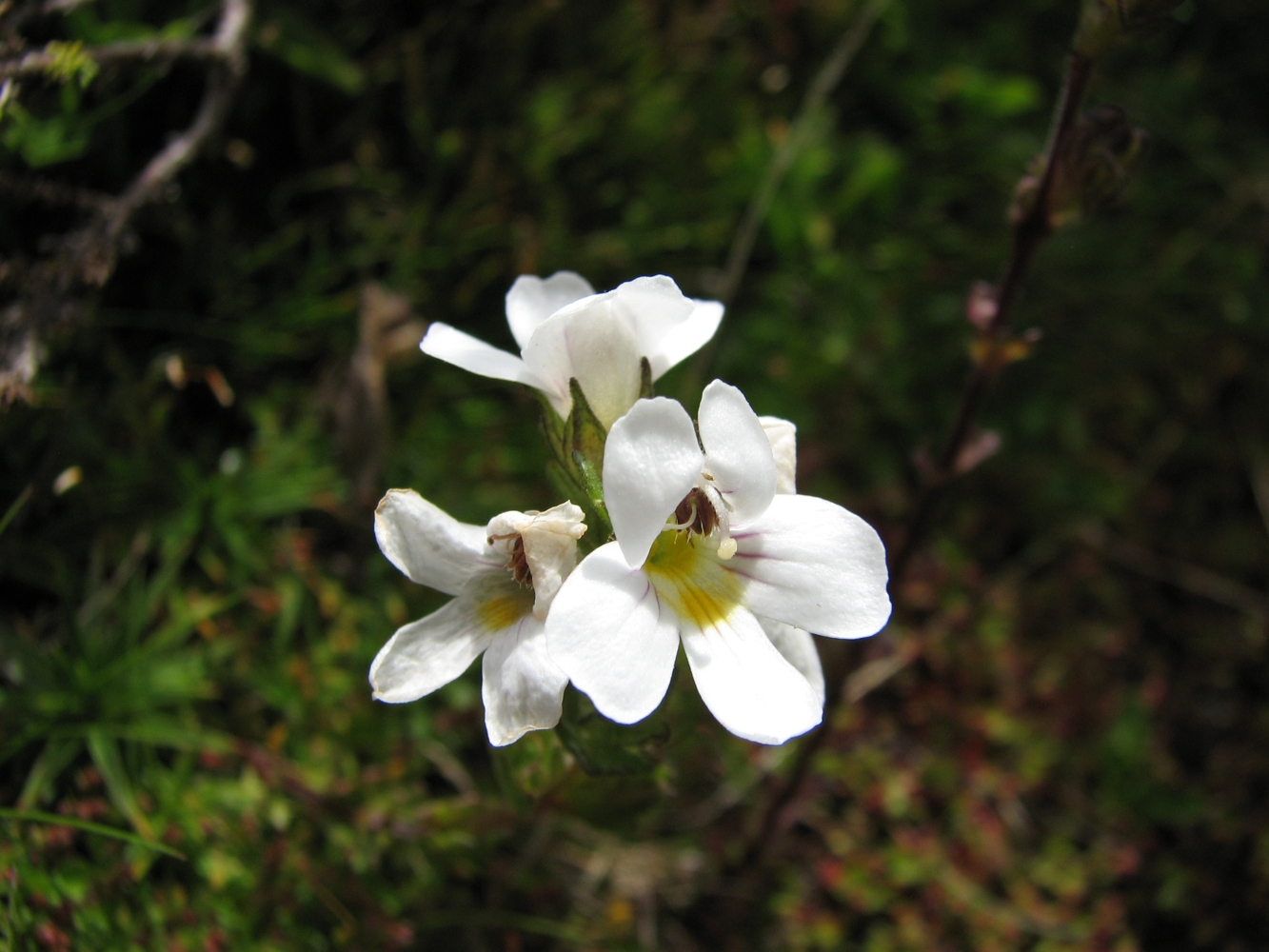
Euphrasia gibbsiae subsp. subglabrifolia

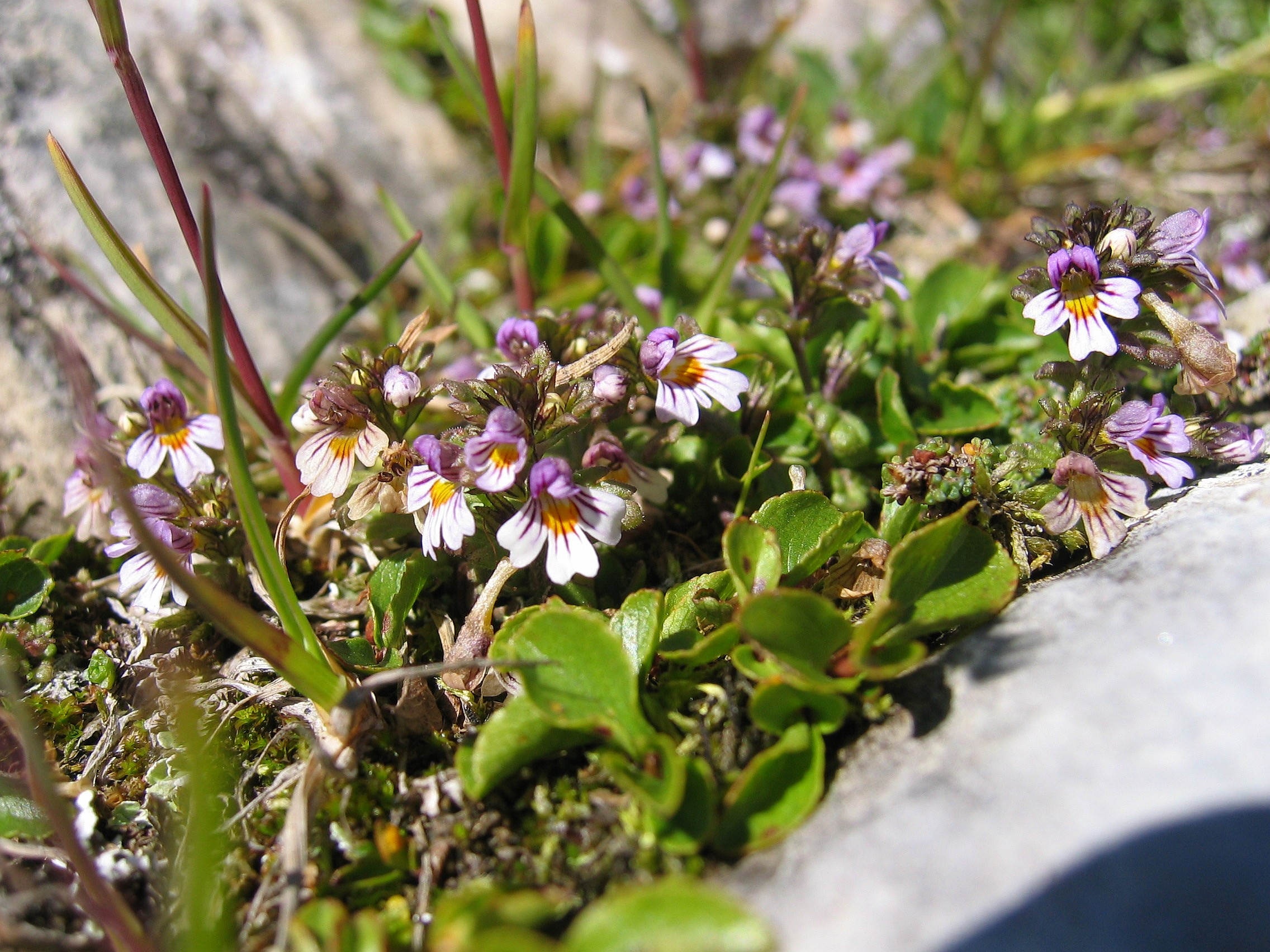
Euphrasia minima

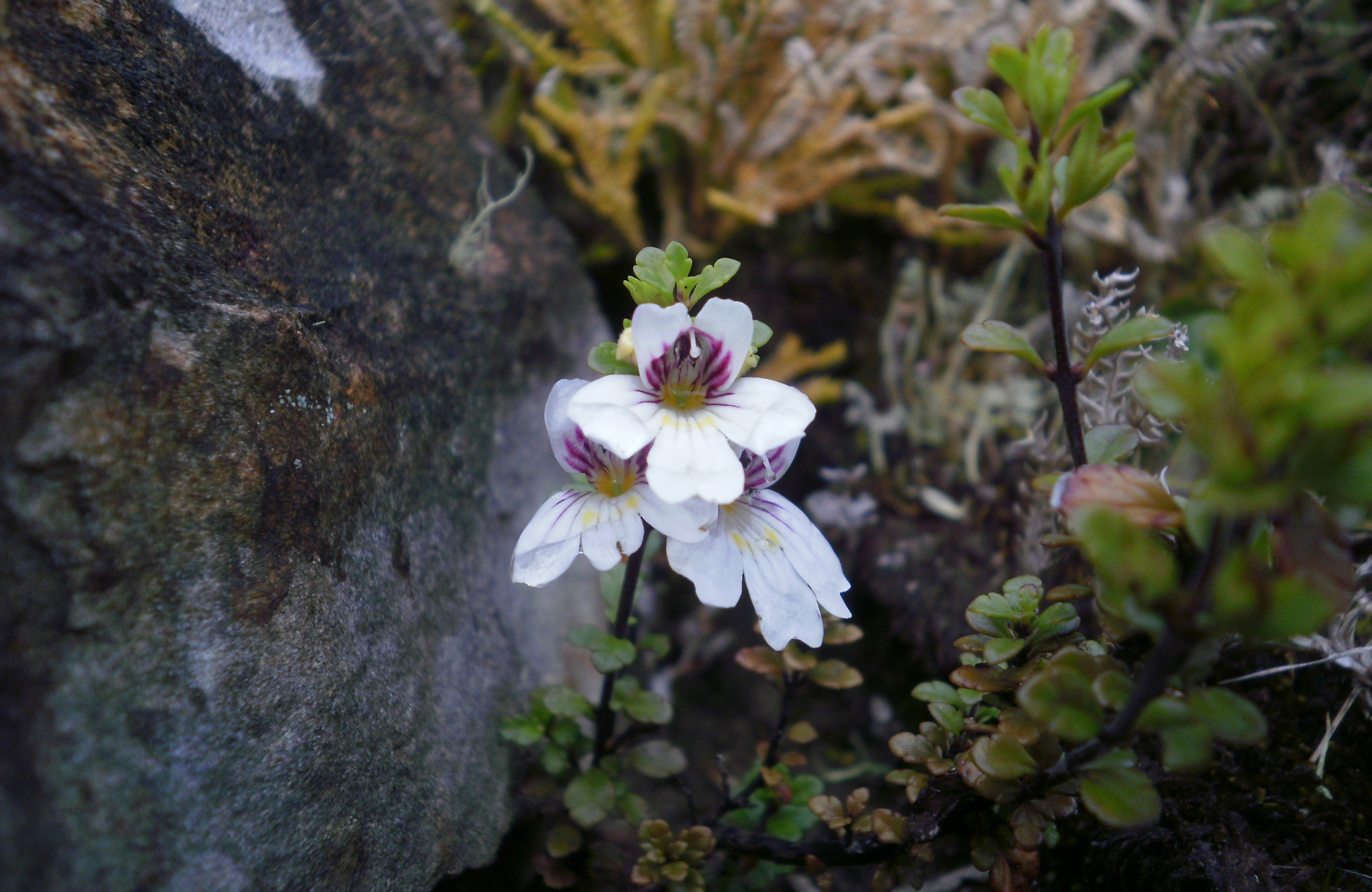
Euphrasia cuneata

- Euphrasia alpina
- Euphrasia arguta – believed extinct until rediscovered in 2008
- Euphrasia brevipila
- Euphrasia cambrica Pugsley
- Euphrasia collina R.Br. – purple eyebright
  - Euphrasia collina ssp. muelleri – Mueller's eyebright
  - Euphrasia collina ssp. osbornii – Osborn's eyebright
- Euphrasia coreana W.Becker – Korean eyebright
- Euphrasia cuneata – North Island eyebright
- Euphrasia crassiuscula Gand
- Euphrasia fennica
- Euphrasia fragosa – shy eyebright, Southport eyebright
- Euphrasia frigida Pugsley – cold-weather eyebright
- Euphrasia gibbsiae
- Euphrasia glabrescens
- Euphrasia hirtella
- Euphrasia hudsoniana – Hudson's eyebright
- Euphrasia lasianthera – hairy eyebright
- Euphrasia micrantha Rchb.
- Euphrasia minima
- Euphrasia nemorosa (Pers.) Wallr. – common eyebright
- Euphrasia officinalis – doctor's eyebright, or medical
- Euphrasia oakesii – Oakes' eyebright
- Euphrasia parviflora
- Euphrasia pseudokerneri Pugsley – chalk eyebright
- Euphrasia randii – small eyebright
- Euphrasia rostkoviana Hayne – red eyebright, "figwort"
- Euphrasia ruptura – extinct
- Euphrasia salisburgensis Funk.
- Euphrasia scabra R.Br. – rough eyebright
- Euphrasia semipicta – peninsula eyebright
- Euphrasia striata R.Br.
- Euphrasia stricta D.Wolff ex J.F.Lehm.
- Euphrasia subarctica – arctic eyebright
- Euphrasia suborbicularis – roundleaf eyebright
- Euphrasia vernalis
- Euphrasia vigursii Davey
- Euphrasia vinacea – glacier eyebright
- Euphrasia sp. 'Bivouac Bay' (Note: Also known as Euphrasia sp. 'fabula'; related to but not identical with E. fabula.) – Bivouac Bay eyebright
