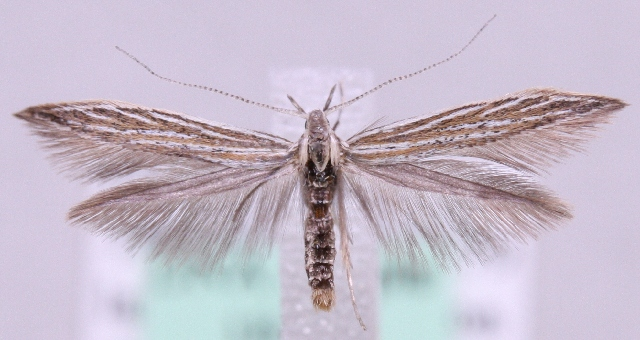

Scientific classification
- Kingdom: Animalia
- Phylum: Arthropoda
- Clade: Pancrustacea
- Class: Insecta
- Order: Lepidoptera
- Family: Coleophoridae
- Genus: Coleophora
- Species: C. adelogrammella

Binomial name
- Coleophora adelogrammella Zeller, 1849

Synonyms
- Coleophora separatella Benander, 1939

= Coleophora adelogrammella =

Species of moth

Coleophora adelogrammella is a moth of the family Coleophoridae. It is found from Fennoscandia to the Iberian Peninsula, Corsica, Italy, North Macedonia and Thrace and from France to Hungary.

The wingspan is 13–15 mm.

The larvae feed on Dianthus sylvestris, Petrorhagia prolifera and Petrorhagia saxifraga.
