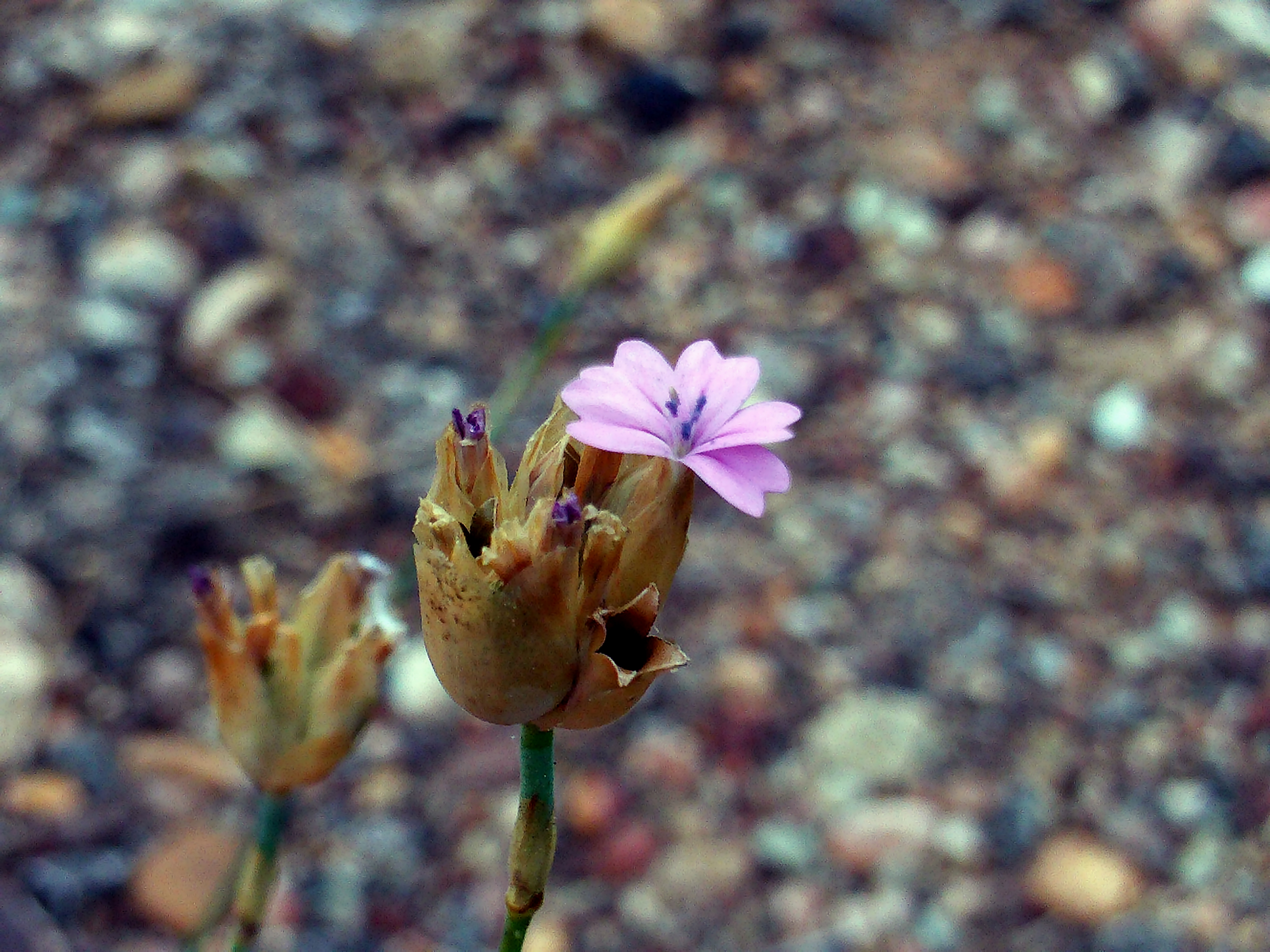

Scientific classification
- Kingdom: Plantae
- Clade: Tracheophytes
- Clade: Angiosperms
- Clade: Eudicots
- Order: Caryophyllales
- Family: Caryophyllaceae
- Genus: Petrorhagia
- Species: P. nanteuilii

Binomial name
- Petrorhagia nanteuilii (Burnat) P.W.Ball & Heywood

= Petrorhagia nanteuilii =

Species of flowering plant

Petrorhagia nanteuilii is a species of flowering plant in the family Caryophyllaceae. Common names include childing pink, productive carnation, proliferous pink and wild carnation. P. nanteuilii in the British Isles was formerly not reliably separated from P. prolifera but now the two are recorded as separate species. Because of this the commonly used name proliferous pink is probably not correct for this taxon. It is an annual that grows to 50 cm tall. Leaves are linear, opposite and stem clasping. Small pink flowers are produced in small ovoid heads, with usually only one flower visible at a time. These are followed by ovoid seed capsules.

The species is native to Europe but has become naturalised elsewhere.
