= Eupithecia gemellata =

Scientific classification
- Domain: Eukaryota
- Kingdom: Animalia
- Phylum: Arthropoda
- Class: Insecta
- Order: Lepidoptera
- Family: Geometridae
- Genus: Eupithecia
- Species: E. gemellata

Binomial name
- Eupithecia gemellata Herrich-Schäffer, 1861

Species of moth

Eupithecia gemellata is a moth in the family Geometridae. It is found in most of southern Europe, as well as the Near East.

The wingspan is 16–17 mm.

The larvae feed on Petrorhagia saxifraga.
