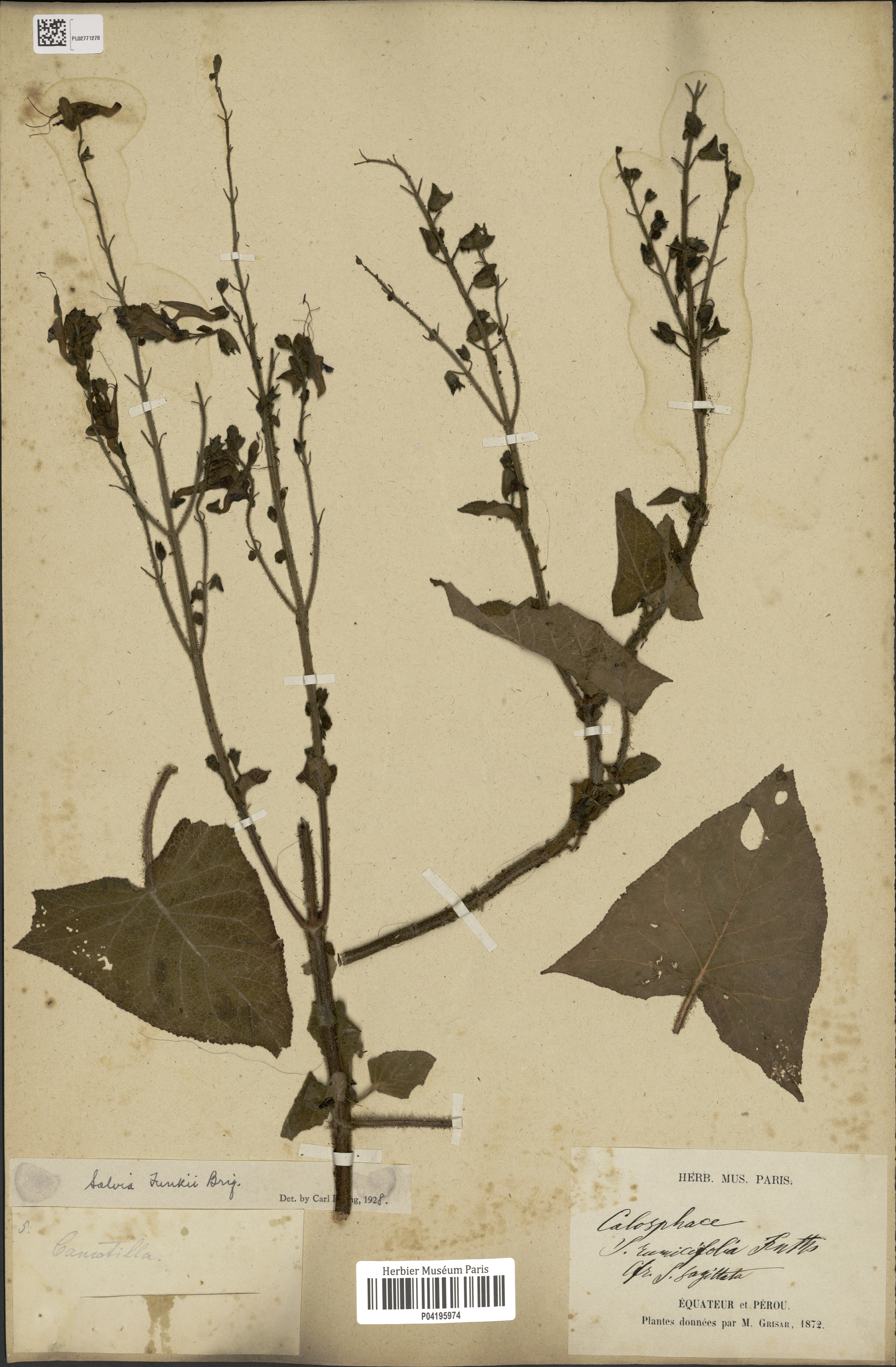

Scientific classification
- Kingdom: Plantae
- Clade: Tracheophytes
- Clade: Angiosperms
- Clade: Eudicots
- Clade: Asterids
- Order: Lamiales
- Family: Lamiaceae
- Genus: Salvia
- Species: S. funckii

Binomial name
- Salvia funckii Briq.

= Salvia funckii =

Species of shrub

Salvia funckii is a perennial shrub native to Colombia, growing on rocky slopes in cloud forest from 2,000 to 2,800 m (6,600 to 9,200 ft) elevation. The plant grows up to 3 m (9.8 ft) tall, with decumbent or ascending stems, and triangular-hastate leaves. The blue flowers are 2.5 to 3 cm (0.98 to 1.18 in) long.
