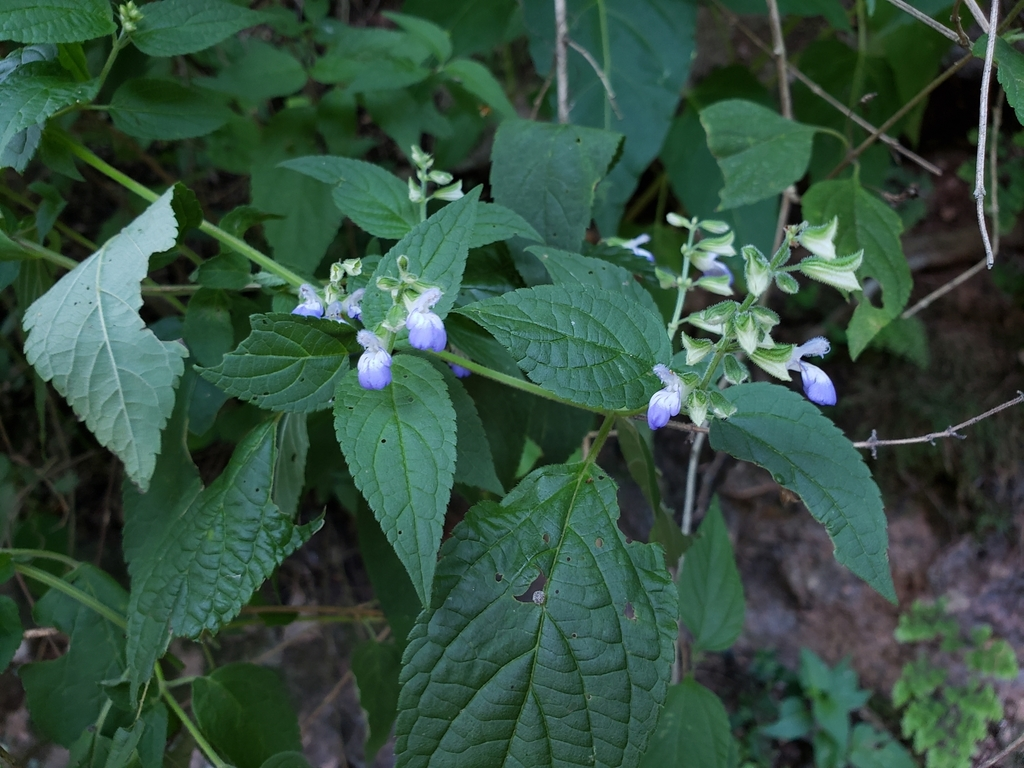

Scientific classification
- Kingdom: Plantae
- Clade: Tracheophytes
- Clade: Angiosperms
- Clade: Eudicots
- Clade: Asterids
- Order: Lamiales
- Family: Lamiaceae
- Genus: Salvia
- Species: S. rypara

Binomial name
- Salvia rypara Briq.

= Salvia rypara =

Species of flowering plant

Salvia rypara is a herbaceous perennial native to Argentina and Bolivia—due to its being very adaptable it is reported to be naturalized in Mexico and possibly Central America. It prefers stream bank habitats, as the specific epithet rypara implies. It also grows in weedy thickets, thriving at elevations under 3,000 feet. Described by John Isaac Briquet in 1896, it is not very well known in horticulture, with only a few gardeners growing it since the 1990s. It is becoming more well known in the United States, France, England, and Italy because it is easy to grow and makes a very attractive garden plant.

Salvia rypara is a small erect plant that grows to 2 feet tall and wide, with many thin stems. The ovate medium-green leaves cover the plant, and grow up to 2-3 inches long and 1.5–2.5 inches wide. The 6–8 inch inflorescences are long and slender, with spaced whorls of 2–12 flowers each, many of them coming into bloom at once. The flowers are a pale lavender, with a flaring lower lip that is just over .5 inch long, and a short erect upper lip.
