= Salvia lachnaioclada =

Scientific classification
- Kingdom: Plantae
- Clade: Tracheophytes
- Clade: Angiosperms
- Clade: Eudicots
- Clade: Asterids
- Order: Lamiales
- Family: Lamiaceae
- Genus: Salvia
- Species: S. lachnaioclada

Binomial name
- Salvia lachnaioclada Briq.

Species of shrub

Salvia lachnaioclada, commonly known as Sosúa sage, is a critically endangered shrub growing on the island of Hispaniola. It has a disjunct distribution and occurs on one hand on a coastal cliff in the Dominican Republic at about 10 metres (33 ft) near Sosúa and on the other hand in dry mountains in the North of Haiti from 400 metres (1,300 ft) to 600 metres (2,000 ft). The Haitian populations have not been observed for more than 80 years and it is possible that the species is locally extinct in Haiti. S. lachnaioclada is very similar and closely related to Salvia bahorucona, but differs in characters of the indumentum, which is white in S. lachnaioclada and yellow in S. bahorucona.
