= Rosa rhaetica =

Conservation status
- Data Deficient (IUCN 3.1)

Scientific classification
- Kingdom: Plantae
- Clade: Tracheophytes
- Clade: Angiosperms
- Clade: Eudicots
- Clade: Rosids
- Order: Rosales
- Family: Rosaceae
- Genus: Rosa
- Species: R. rhaetica

Binomial name
- Rosa rhaetica Gremli

Synonyms
- List: Rosa afzeliana subsp. rhaetica (Gremli) R.Keller & Gams; Rosa caesia subsp. rhaetica (Gremli) Soó; Rosa caryophyllacea f. killiasii Godet ex Christ; Rosa caryophyllacea var. levieri (Christ) Posp.; Rosa caryophyllacea f. levieri Christ; Rosa caryophyllacea f. taraspensis Godet ex Christ; Rosa coriifolia subsp. rhaetica (Gremli) Schinz & R.Keller; Rosa coriifolia var. rhaetica (Gremli) Crép.; Rosa × protea var. rupifraga Heinr.Braun; Rosa rhaetica f. burmiensis R.Keller; Rosa rhaetica var. cadolensis R.Keller; Rosa rhaetica var. castelli R.Keller; Rosa rhaetica var. grandifrons R.Keller; Rosa rhaetica f. hispida R.Keller; Rosa rhaetica var. homoeacantha R.Keller; Rosa rhaetica var. intermedia R.Keller; Rosa rhaetica var. killiasii (Godet ex Christ) R.Keller; Rosa rhaetica f. levieri (Christ) Gremli; Rosa rhaetica var. levieri (Christ) R.Keller; Rosa rhaetica var. rupifraga (Heinr.Braun) R.Keller; Rosa rhaetica var. schulzeana Dingler; Rosa rhaetica f. subhispida R.Keller; Rosa rhaetica f. subvillosa R.Keller; Rosa rhaetica var. taraspensis (Godet ex Christ) R.Keller; Rosa rhaetica var. thermalis R.Keller; Rosa rhaetica var. typica R.Keller; Rosa rhaetica var. villosa R.Keller; Rosa thermalis Cornaz ex R.Keller

Species of plant

Rosa rhaetica, the Raetic rose, is a species of flowering plant in the family Rosaceae, native to the Alps of eastern Switzerland, western Austria, and northern Italy. A shrub with a very narrow distribution, it resembles Rosa dumalis and Rosa rubiginosa, but can be distinguished from them by careful examination of a suite of morphological traits.
