= Berberocarum =

Scientific classification
- Kingdom: Plantae
- Clade: Tracheophytes
- Clade: Angiosperms
- Clade: Eudicots
- Clade: Asterids
- Order: Apiales
- Family: Apiaceae
- Genus: Berberocarum; Zakharova & Pimenov
- Species: B. atlanticum

Binomial name
- Berberocarum atlanticum (Coss. ex Batt.) Zakharova & Pimenov

Synonyms
- Carum atlanticum (Coss. ex Ball) Litard. & Maire; Meum atlanticum Coss. ex Batt. (1919) (basionym)

Genus of flowering plants

Berberocarum is a genus of flowering plants in the family Apiaceae. It includes a single species, Berberocarum atlanticum, which is endemic to the High Atlas of Morocco. It is an herbaceous perennial which grows which grows 5 to 20 cm tall, with a compact caudex and a taproot.

The species was first described as Meum atlanticum in 1919 by Jules Aimé Battandier, who attributed the name to Ernest Saint-Charles Cosson. In 1928 René Verriet de Litardière and René Charles Joseph Ernest Maire placed in genus Carum as Carum atlanticum. A morphological and phylogenetic study by Zakharova et al. published in 2021 concluded that the species was distinct from other species in Carum, and the authors placed it in the new monotypic genus Berberocarum as Berberocarum atlanticum.
