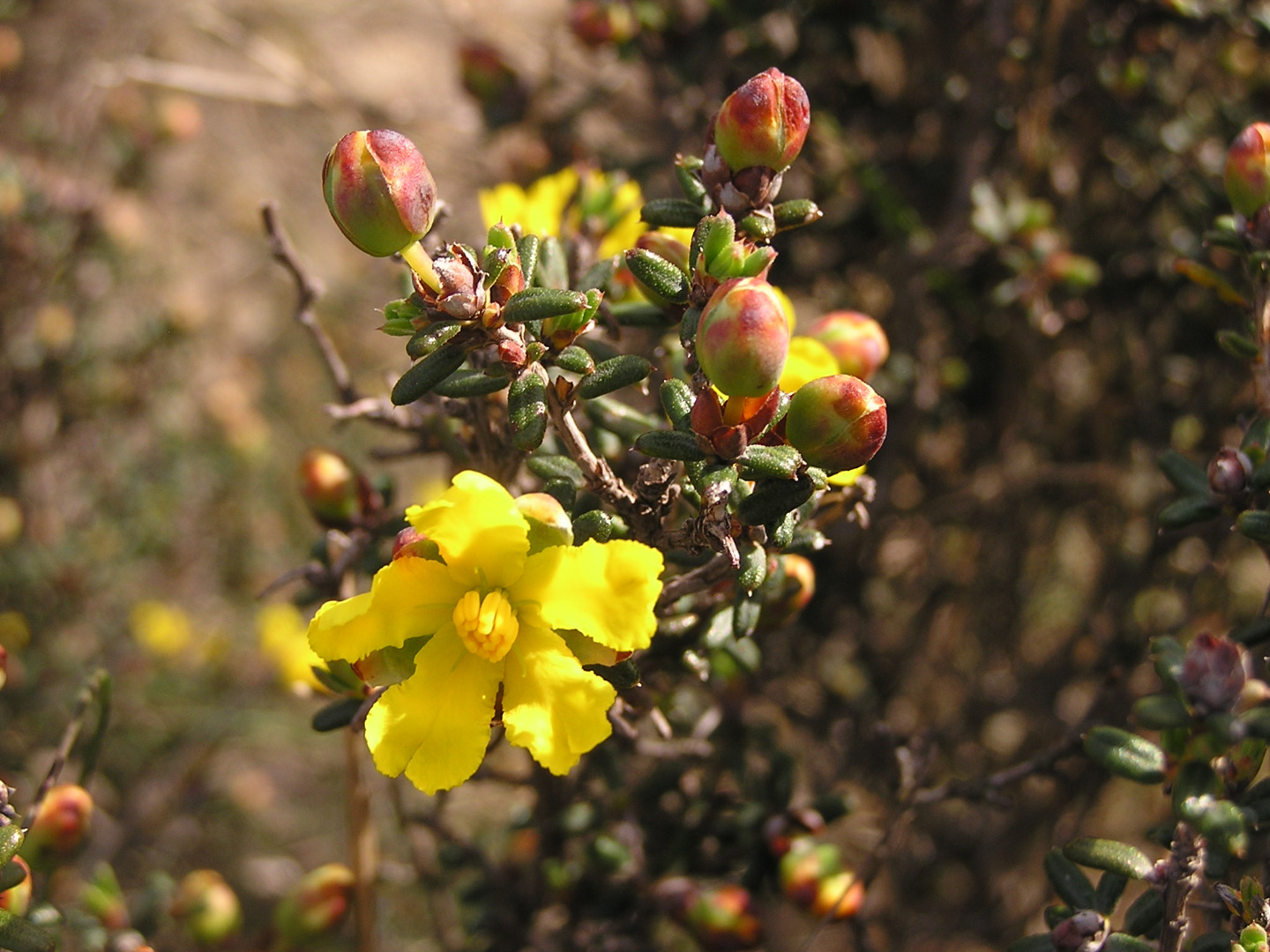

Scientific classification
- Kingdom: Plantae
- Clade: Embryophytes
- Clade: Tracheophytes
- Clade: Spermatophytes
- Clade: Angiosperms
- Clade: Eudicots
- Order: Dilleniales
- Family: Dilleniaceae
- Genus: Hibbertia
- Species: H. exasperata

Binomial name
- Hibbertia exasperata (Steud.) Briq.

Synonyms
- Candollea exasperata Steud.

= Hibbertia exasperata =

Species of flowering plant

Hibbertia exasperata is a species of flowering plant in the family Dilleniaceae and is endemic to the south-west of Western Australia. It is an erect or straggling shrub that typically grows to a height of 10–60 cm (3.9–23.6 in) with sharply-pointed leaves. It has yellow flowers from June to October and grows on low ridges and sandplains. It was first formally described in 1845 by Ernst Gottlieb von Steudel in Johann Georg Christian Lehmann's Plantae Preissianae and was given the name Candollea exasperata. In 1900, John Isaac Briquet changed the name to Hibbertia exasperata. The specific epithet (exasperata) means "rough, with short, hard points", referring to the leaves.

Hibbertia exasperata is classified as "not threatened" by the Government of Western Australia Department of Parks and Wildlife.

== See also ==
- List of Hibbertia species
