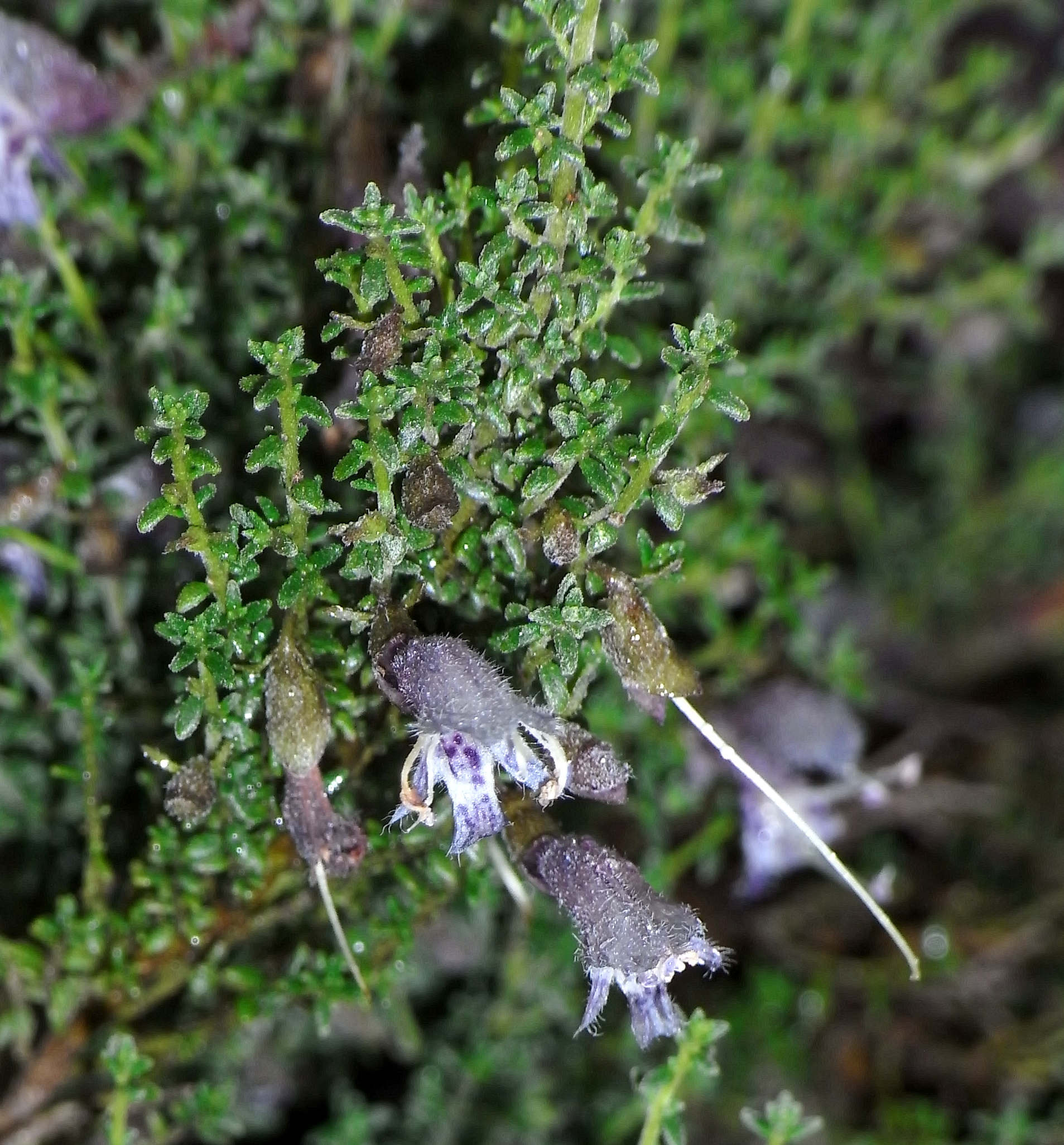
- Subspecies microphylla

Scientific classification
- Kingdom: Plantae
- Clade: Tracheophytes
- Clade: Angiosperms
- Clade: Eudicots
- Clade: Asterids
- Order: Lamiales
- Family: Lamiaceae
- Genus: Prostanthera
- Species: P. serpyllifolia

Binomial name
- Prostanthera serpyllifolia (R.Br.) Briq.
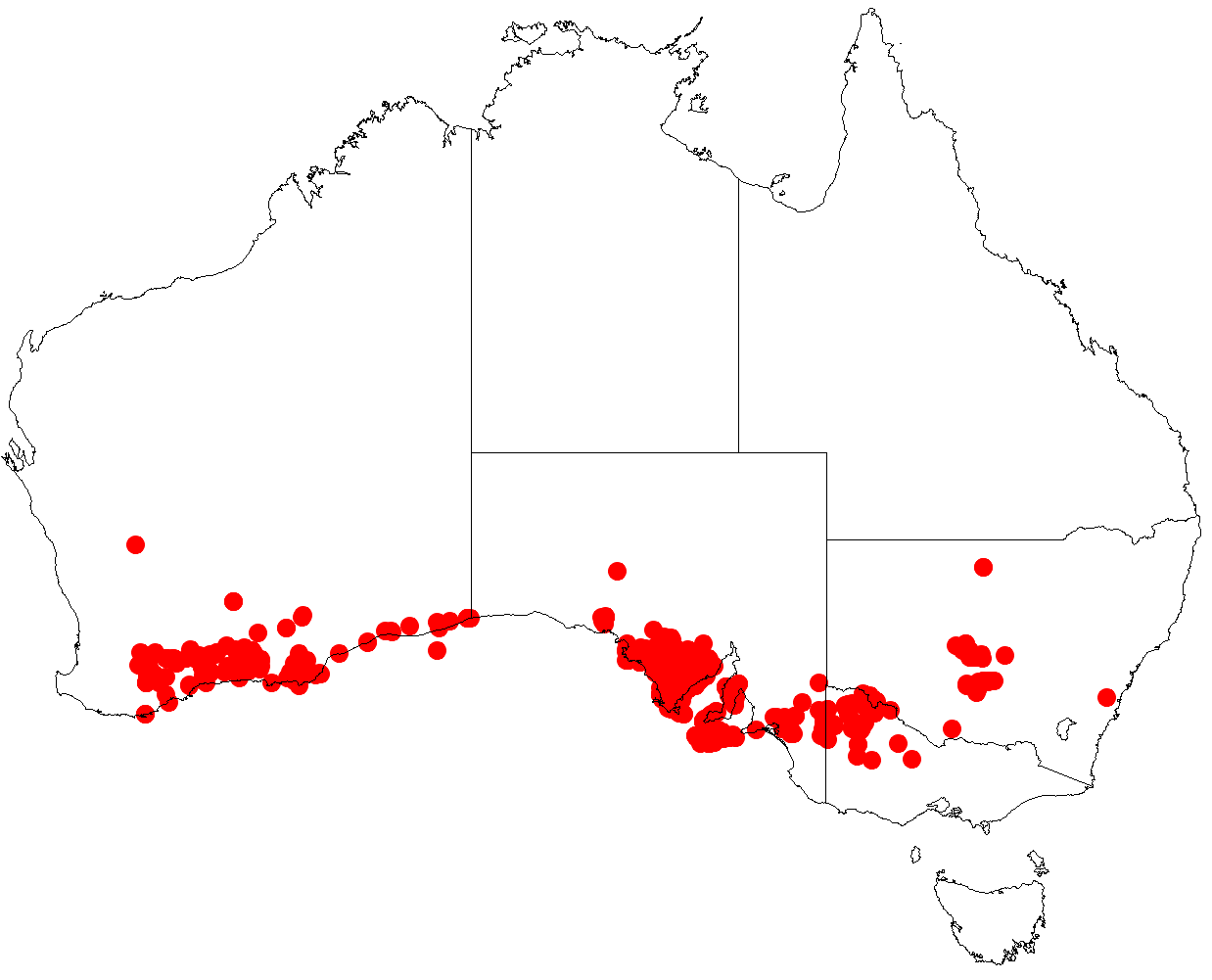
- Occurrence data from AVH

Synonyms
- Cryphia serpyllifolia R.Br.

= Prostanthera serpyllifolia =

Small-leaved mint-bush

Species of plant

Prostanthera serpyllifolia, commonly known as small-leaved mint-bush, is a species of flowering plant in the family Lamiaceae and is endemic to southern Australia. It is a small shrub with small egg-shaped leaves and bright pink to red or metallic bluish-green flowers.

== Description ==
Prostanthera serpyllifolia is a prostrate to erect shrub that typically grows to a height of less than 0.5 m (1 ft 8 in) with hairy white branches. The leaves are egg-shaped to broadly elliptic, 1.5–3 mm (0.059–0.118 in) long and 0.7–1.3 mm (0.028–0.051 in) wide and sessile or on a petiole up to 1.5 mm (0.059 in) long. The flowers are borne in leaf axils on a pedicel 1–5 mm (0.039–0.197 in) long with bracteoles usually 2–4 mm (0.079–0.157 in) long at the base of the sepals. The sepals are 5–7.5 mm (0.20–0.30 in) long and form a tube 3–5 mm (0.12–0.20 in) long with lobes 1.5–2.2 mm (0.059–0.087 in) long. The petals are bright pink to mid red, often white near the base, sometimes with a yellow tinge, and sometimes metallic bluish green, 15–22 mm (0.59–0.87 in) long forming a tube 9–14 mm (0.35–0.55 in) long. The lower middle lobe of the petal tube is 3–4 mm (0.12–0.16 in) long and wide, the side lobes 1–4.5 mm (0.039–0.177 in) long and wide. The upper lip of the petal tube is 5–7 mm (0.20–0.28 in) long and wide with a small central notch. Flowering occurs in April or from June to December.

== Taxonomy ==
Small-leaved mint-bush was first formally described in 1810 by botanist Robert Brown, who gave it the name Cryphia serpyllifolia, and published the description in Prodromus Florae Novae Hollandiae et Insulae Van Diemen, based on plant material collected from the southern Eyre Peninsula in South Australia. In 1895 John Isaac Briquet changed the name to Prostanthera serpyllifolia.

In 1984, Barry Conn described two subspecies of P. serpyllifolia in the Journal of the Adelaide Botanic Gardens and the names are accepted by the Australian Plant Census:

- Prostanthera serpyllifolia subsp. microphylla (R.Br.) B.J.Conn that has leaves mostly 1.5–3 mm (0.059–0.118 in) long and 0.5–1 mm (0.020–0.039 in) wide and sessile or on a very short petiole;
- Prostanthera serpyllifolia (R.Br.) Briq. subsp. serpyllifolia that has leaves mostly 4–13 mm (0.16–0.51 in) long and 1–4 mm (0.039–0.157 in) wide on a petiole 0.5–1.5 mm (0.020–0.059 in) long.

== Distribution and habitat ==
Prostanthera serpyllifolia occurs in New South Wales, Victoria, South Australia and Western Australia where it often grows in mallee communities, often on limestone or calcrete. Subspecies microphylla occurs in New South Wales where it is found west from near West Wyalong. The same subspecies grows in the far north-west of Victoria, in the south east of South Australia, and along the southern part of Western Australia as far west as the southern Avon Wheatbelt. Subspecies serpyllifolia occurs on the Yorke and Eyre Peninsulas and there is a single record from the southwest of Western Australia.
