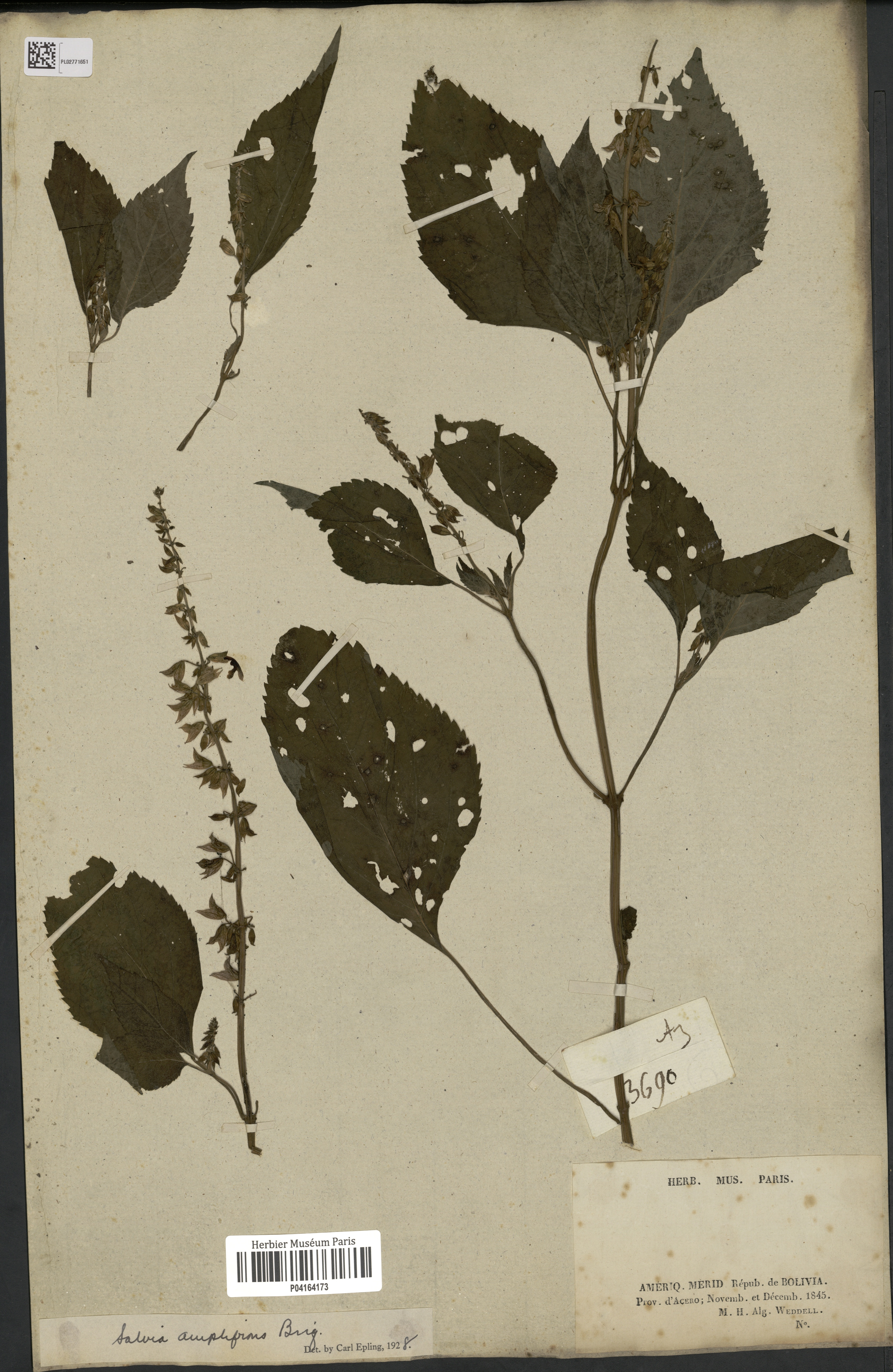

Scientific classification
- Kingdom: Plantae
- Clade: Tracheophytes
- Clade: Angiosperms
- Clade: Eudicots
- Clade: Asterids
- Order: Lamiales
- Family: Lamiaceae
- Genus: Salvia
- Species: S. amplifrons

Binomial name
- Salvia amplifrons Briq.

= Salvia amplifrons =

Species of herb

Salvia amplifrons is an annual or short-lived perennial herb that is endemic to Bolivia, growing at 2,650 to 3,000 metres (8,690 to 9,840 ft) elevation in forest shade on moist ground.

S. amplifrons grows upright to 30 to 60 centimetres (0.98 to 1.97 ft), with ovate or ovate-elliptic leaves that are 5 to 12 cm (2.0 to 4.7 in) by 3.5 to 8 cm (1.4 to 3.1 in). The inflorescence is a terminal raceme with about 6-flowered verticillasters, up to 10 cm (3.9 in) long. The 12 to 15 mm (0.47 to 0.59 in) corolla is white with slight blue flushing.
