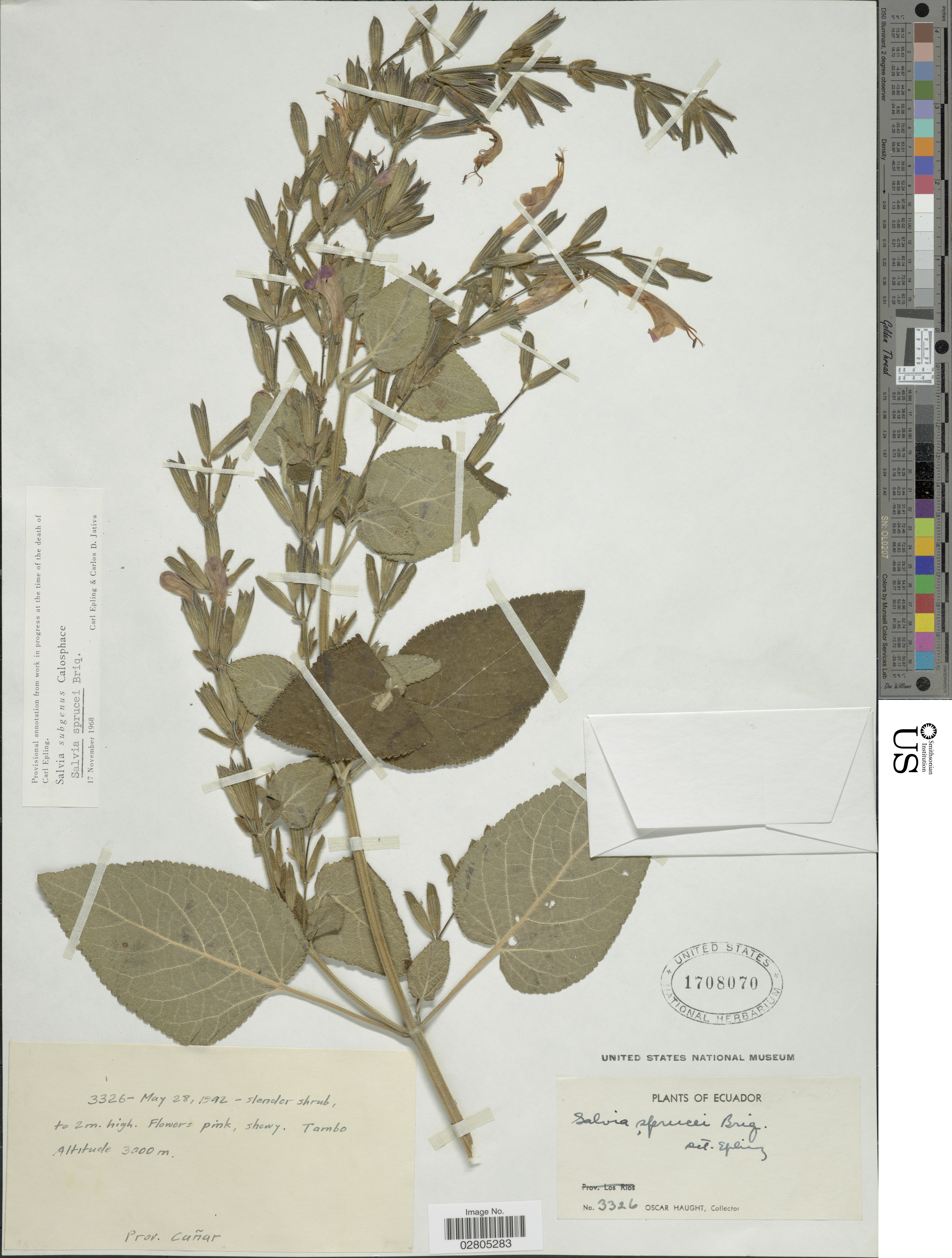

Conservation status
- Data Deficient (IUCN 3.1)

Scientific classification
- Kingdom: Plantae
- Clade: Tracheophytes
- Clade: Angiosperms
- Clade: Eudicots
- Clade: Asterids
- Order: Lamiales
- Family: Lamiaceae
- Genus: Salvia
- Species: S. sprucei

Binomial name
- Salvia sprucei Briq.

= Salvia sprucei =

Species of flowering plant

Salvia sprucei is a herbaceous perennial in the family Lamiaceae that is native to Ecuador, growing at 7,000 feet (2,100 m) elevation or higher in thick scrub on steep slopes. It was named in 1898 by botanist John Isaac Briquet for the British plant collector Richard Spruce. It is likely that Spruce discovered the plant on a collecting trip in Ecuador in 1857.

Salvia sprucei is a many-branched plant that reaches up to 12 feet (3.7 m) high and 6 feet (1.8 m) wide. The leaves are ovate and vary in size, growing up to 3.5 inches (8.9 cm) long and 1.5 inches (3.8 cm) wide. The top of the leaf is green with a yellow undertone, while the underside has white veining that is covered with hairs. The watermelon pink flowers are 1.5 inches (3.8 cm) long, with the upper lip hooded and covered in fine hairs. The calyces are yellow-green and quite long, reaching 0.75 inches (1.9 cm). The loosely held whorls of flowers grow on branched inflorescences.
