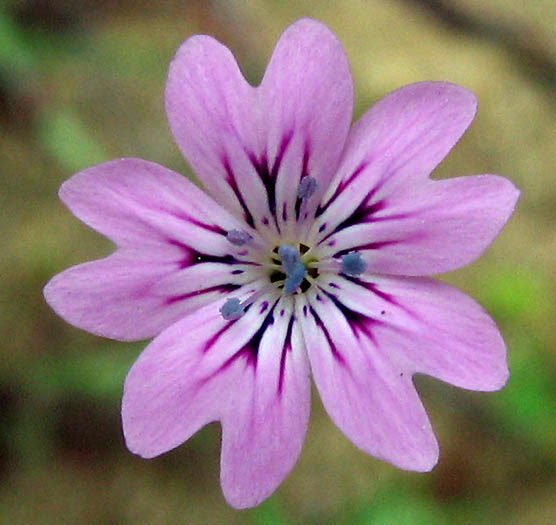

Scientific classification
- Kingdom: Plantae
- Clade: Tracheophytes
- Clade: Angiosperms
- Clade: Eudicots
- Order: Caryophyllales
- Family: Caryophyllaceae
- Genus: Petrorhagia
- Species: P. dubia

Binomial name
- Petrorhagia dubia (Raf.) G.López & Romo

Synonyms
- Dianthus dubius Raf.; Dianthus sartorii Fruehl. ex Nyman; Dianthus velutinus Guss.; Gypsophila velutina (Guss.) D.Dietr.; Kohlrauschia dubia (Raf.) Holub; Kohlrauschia velutina (Guss.) Rchb.; Petrorhagia prolifera subsp. velutina (Guss.) O.Bolòs & Vigo; Petrorhagia velutina (Guss.) P.W.Ball & Heywood; Petrorhagia velutina var. levicaulis (Rouy & Foucaud) Hub.-Mor.; Tunica prolifera var. velutina (Guss.) Ewart; Tunica velutina (Guss.) Fisch. & C.A.Mey.

= Petrorhagia dubia =

Species of flowering plant

Petrorhagia dubia is a species of flowering plant in the family Caryophyllaceae known by the common name hairy pink. It is native to southern Europe and the Mediterranean Basin, but it is known on other continents, including Australia and North and South America, as an introduced species and sometimes a weed. It is an annual herb growing 25 to 60 centimeters tall, but known to reach 90 centimeters in height. The leaves are up to 6 centimeters long, sheathing the stem at the bases. The inflorescence bears a head-like cluster of flowers, their bases enclosed in a large, expanded mass of wide, claw-tipped bracts. The flower corollas are each further encased in a tubular calyx of sepals. The petals are bright pink to magenta or lavender in color with darker veins. Each is heart-shaped or divided into two lobes at the tip. The fruit is a capsule containing many tiny seeds.
