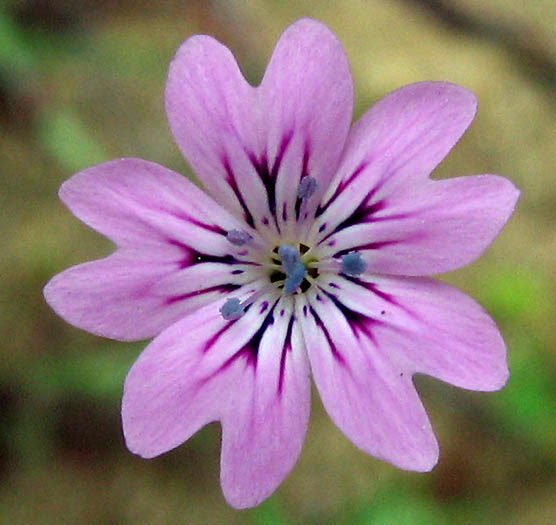
- Petrorhagia dubia

Scientific classification
- Kingdom: Plantae
- Clade: Tracheophytes
- Clade: Angiosperms
- Clade: Eudicots
- Order: Caryophyllales
- Family: Caryophyllaceae
- Genus: Petrorhagia (Ser.) Link (1831)

Synonyms
- Dianthella Clauson ex Pomel (1860); Fiedleria Rchb. (1841); Imperatia Moench (1792); Kohlrauschia Kunth (1838); Tunica Mert. & W.D.J.Koch (1831), nom. illeg.

= Petrorhagia =

Genus of flowering plants

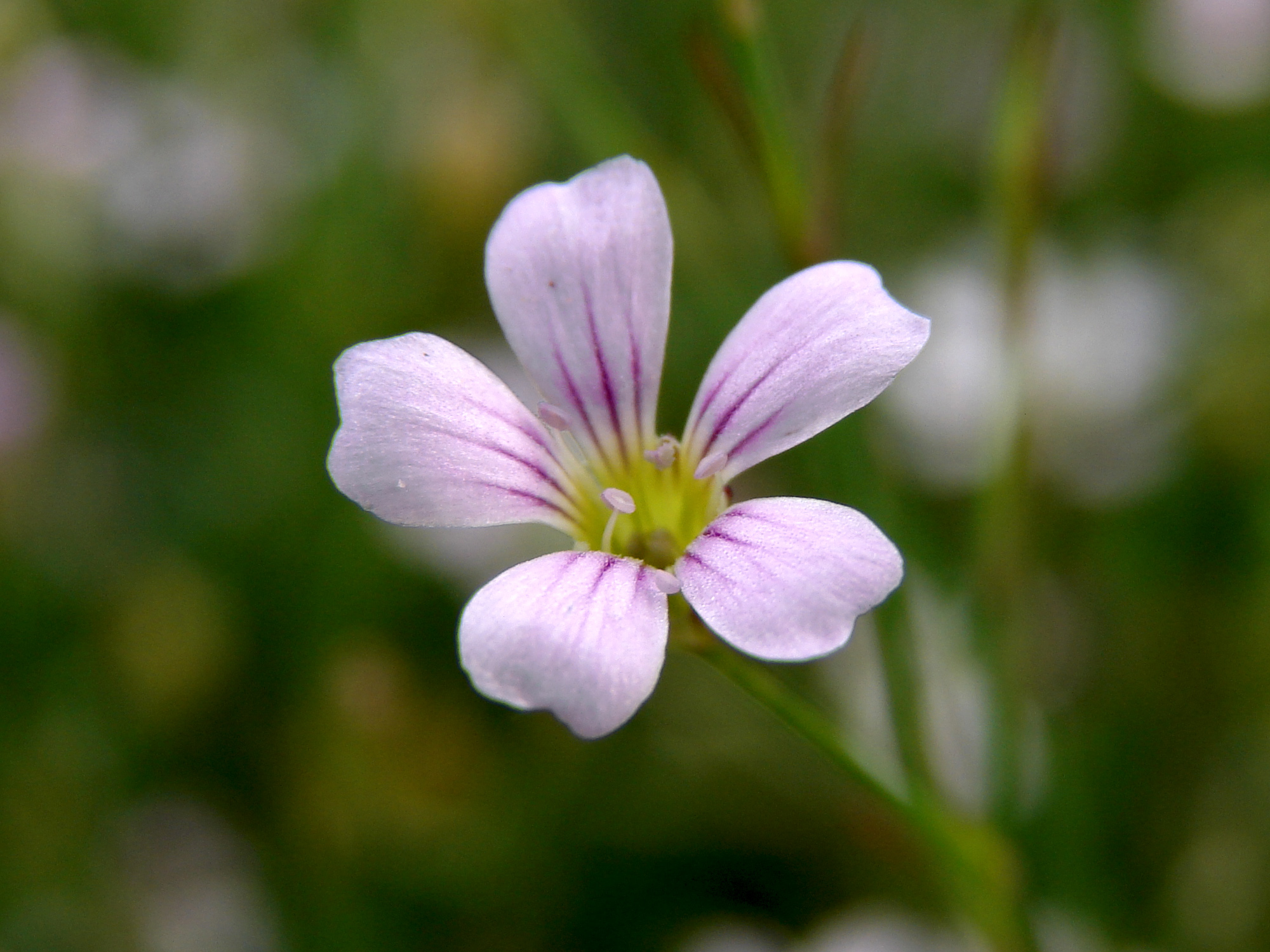
Petrorhagia saxifraga

Petrorhagia is a small genus of annual and perennial plants of the family Caryophyllaceae, mostly native to the Mediterranean region. It is low-growing with wiry stems and narrow, grass-like leaves. The flowers are small, in clusters similar to members of the genus Dianthus, in pink, lilac, or white. Petrorhagia saxifraga is the tunic flower or coat flower, similar to baby's breath, but shorter, and used in rock gardens.

These plants are mainly native to Eurasia, but some species can be found nearly worldwide, having been introduced to other continents.

== Species ==
As of 2024, Kew's Plants of the World Online lists 29 accepted species of Petrorhagia:

- Petrorhagia arabica (Boiss.) P.W.Ball & Heywood
- Petrorhagia cyrenaica (E.A.Durand & Barratte) P.W.Ball &
- Petrorhagia dianthoides (Sm.) P.W.Ball & Heywood
- Petrorhagia dubia (Raf.) G.López & Romo – hairy pink
- Petrorhagia elymaitica (Mozaff.) Falat., Assadi & F.Ghahrem.
- Petrorhagia fasciculata (Margot & Reut.) P.W.Ball &
- Petrorhagia glumacea (Bory & Chaub.) P.W.Ball &
- Petrorhagia graminea (Sm.) P.W.Ball & Heywood
- Petrorhagia grandiflora Iatroú
- Petrorhagia hispidula (Boiss. & Heldr.) P.W.Ball &
- Petrorhagia kennedyae (A.K.Jacks. & Turrill) P.W.Ball &
- Petrorhagia laconica Trigas, Kalpoutz. & Kougioum.
- Petrorhagia lycica (P.H.Davis) P.W.Ball & Heywood
- Petrorhagia macra (Boiss. & Hausskn.) P.W.Ball &
- Petrorhagia nanteuilii (Burnat) P.W.Ball & Heywood – childing pink
- Petrorhagia obcordata (Margot & Reut.) Greuter &
- Petrorhagia ochroleuca (Sm.) P.W.Ball & Heywood
- Petrorhagia pamphylica (Boiss. & Balansa) P.W.Ball &
- Petrorhagia peroninii (Boiss.) P.W.Ball & Heywood
- Petrorhagia phthiotica (Boiss. & Heldr.) P.W.Ball &
- Petrorhagia prolifera (L.) P.W.Ball & Heywood – proliferous pink
- Petrorhagia rhiphaea (Pau & Font Quer) P.W.Ball
- Petrorhagia rupestris Brullo & Furnari
- Petrorhagia sarbaghiae S.A.Ahmad
- Petrorhagia saxifraga (L.) Link – tunic-flower
- Petrorhagia syriaca (Boiss.) Mouterde & Greuter
- Petrorhagia thessala (Boiss.) P.W.Ball & Heywood
- Petrorhagia wheeler-hainesii Rech.f.
- Petrorhagia zoharyana Liston
