= René Verriet de Litardière =

René Verriet de Litardière (24 June 1888, Mazières-en-Gâtine – 24 October 1957, Mazières-en-Gâtine) was a French botanist.

== Education and Career ==
He studied botany in Poitiers, and after World War I, obtained his doctorate in Paris with a thesis on fern cytology. For ten years he was associated with the University of Lille (1921–1931), then spent the remainder of his career as director of the botanical institute at Grenoble.

=== Legacy ===
He is best remembered for his studies of Corsican flora, undertaking 28 expeditions to the island during his career. He was also an authority on the grass genus Festuca. In 1996 the herbarium of the Conservatoire et Jardin botaniques de la Ville de Genève acquired his botanical collection of 30,000 specimens. Taxa with the specific epithet of litardiereana commemorate his name.

== Published works ==
- With John Isaac Briquet, he was co-author of the three-volume Prodrome de la flore Corse. Other noteworthy written efforts by Litardière are:
- Voyage botanique en Corse, 1909.
- Contributions à l'étude phytosociologique de la Corse, with Gustave Malcuit (5 parts, 1926–1931).
- Nouvelles contributions à l'étude de la flore de la Corse (4 parts, 1928–1930).
- Contributions à l'étude de la flore des Alpes occidentales, 1933.
