= August Gremli =

Swiss physician and botanist

August Gremli (15 March 1833 – 30 March 1899) was a Swiss physician and botanist born in Kreuzlingen.

He studied medicine in Berlin and Munich, and afterwards, trained as a pharmacist in Karlsruhe. From 1876, he worked as a curator in the herbarium of botanist Émile Burnat (1828–1920) in Nant, located near the town of Vevey. He died in Kreuzlingen on March 30, 1899.

Gremli published several works on Swiss flora, including Excursionsflora für die Schweiz (1867), a book that was later translated into English. In addition, he collaborated with Burnat on a number of essays involving flora from the Maritime Alps.

== Selected publications ==
- Excursionsflora für die Schweiz, 1867 (5th edition translated into English by Leonard W. Paitson as "The Flora of Switzerland" 1888)
- Beiträge zur Flora der Schweiz (Contributions to the Flora of Switzerland), 1870
- Neue Beiträge zur Flora der Schweiz (New Contributions to the Flora of Switzerland), 1880-1890
