= Émile Burnat =

Swiss botanist

Émile Burnat (21 October 1828 in Vevey, Vaud – 31 August 1920) was a Swiss botanist.

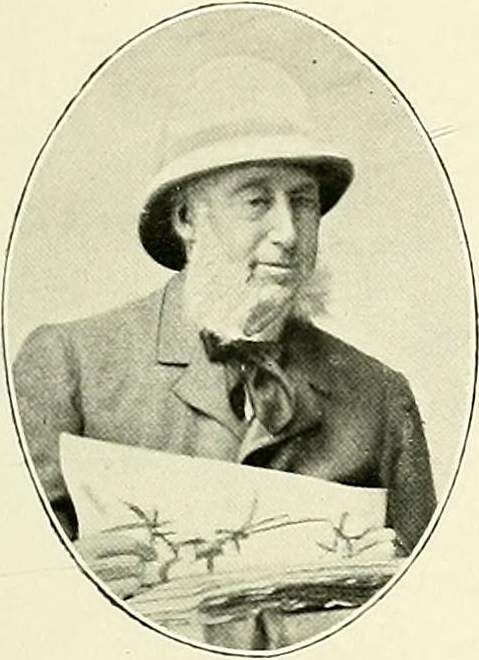
Émile Burnat

He began herborizing while still in his teens, later working at the Conservatoire et Jardin botaniques in Geneva. He is remembered for investigations of flora found in the Maritime Alps. His impressive herbarium is now part of the botanical conservatory in Geneva.

Burnat's name is lent to the botanical genus Burnatia and the saxifrage cultivar Saxifraga × burnatii.

== Written works ==
- Flore des Alpes maritimes ou Catalogue raisonné des plantes qui croissent spontanément dans la chaîne des Alpes maritimes, etc.; (7 volumes 1892–1931, with John Isaac Briquet and François Cavillier).
- Catalogue raisonné des Hieracium des Alpes Maritimes; (1883, with August Gremli).
