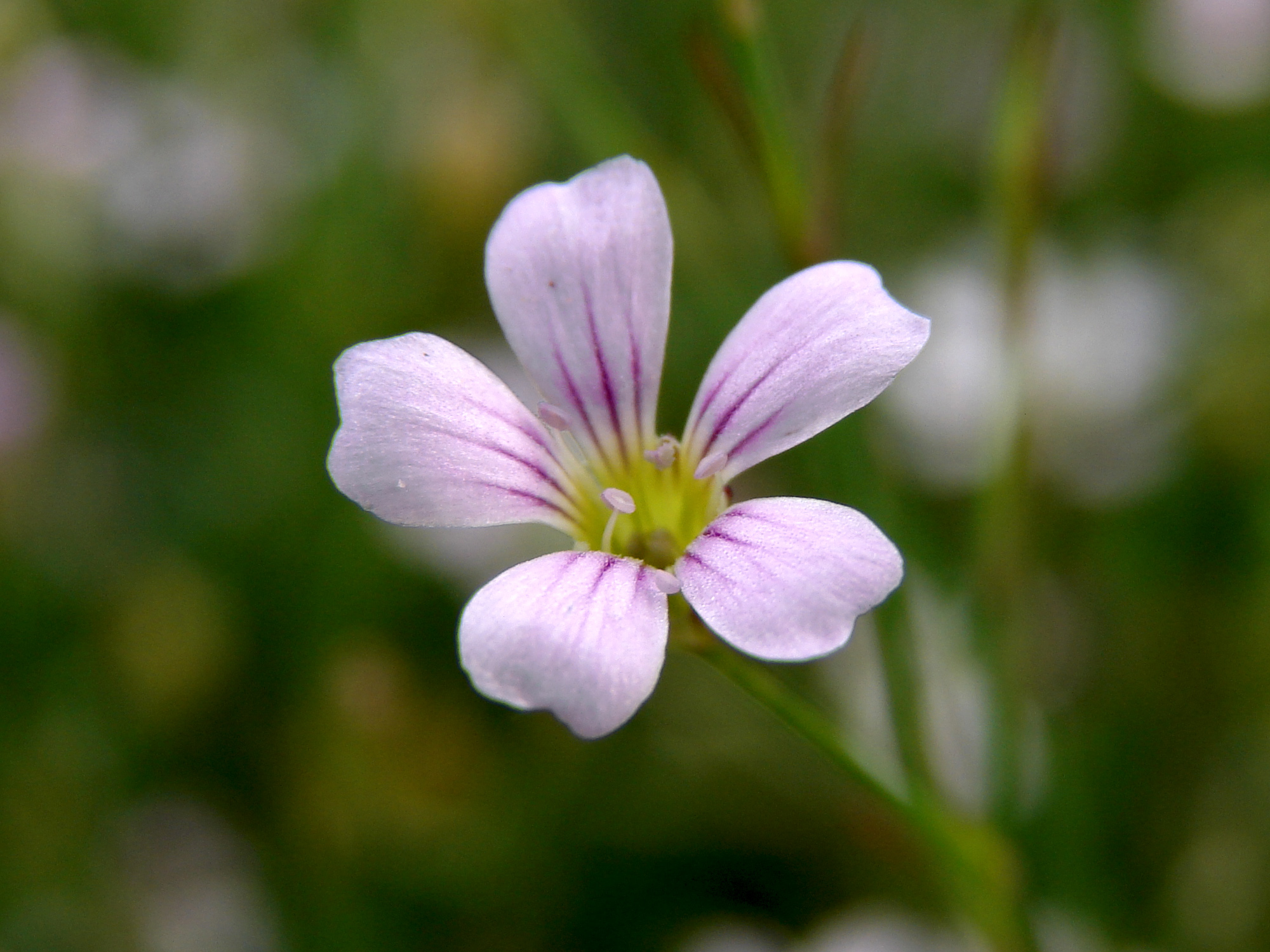

Scientific classification
- Kingdom: Plantae
- Clade: Tracheophytes
- Clade: Angiosperms
- Clade: Eudicots
- Order: Caryophyllales
- Family: Caryophyllaceae
- Genus: Petrorhagia
- Species: P. saxifraga

Binomial name
- Petrorhagia saxifraga (L.) Link

Synonyms
- List: Dianthus filiformis Lam.; Dianthus saxifragus L.; Gypsophila arenicola Dufour; Gypsophila asperula Dufour ex Nyman; Gypsophila eubonensis Sibth. & Boiss.; Gypsophila multicaulis Poir.; Gypsophila permixta Guss.; Gypsophila rigida L.; Gypsophila saxifraga L.; Gypsophila scabra Schult. ex Steud.; Imperatia filiformis Moench; Kohlrauschia saxifraga (L.) Dandy; Silene tunica E.H.L.Krause; Tunica arenicola Nyman; Tunica ciliata Dulac; Tunica erecta Jord. & Fourr.; Tunica saxifraga (L.) Scop.; Tunica xerophila Jord. & Fourr.

= Petrorhagia saxifraga =

Species of flowering plant

Petrorhagia saxifraga, known as tunic flower or coat flower, is a small, herbaceous flowering plant in the family Caryophyllaceae. It is native to central and southern Europe, Turkey, the Caucasus, and Iran, and introduced to the United States and Canada, Great Britain, the Baltic States, Poland, and Sweden. Petrorhagia saxifraga is also known as tunic saxifrage, pink saxifrage, or just pink.

It is a wiry plant with numerous branching stems, narrow leaves, and flowers growing solitary at the ends of branches. The petals range from pink to white. It is commonly cultivated in rock gardens and used along borders, escaping to grow in lawns, along roadsides, along shorelines, and in other sandy disturbed areas.

Tunic flower was originally described as Dianthus saxifragus by Carl Linnaeus in 1753 and renamed Petrorhagia saxifraga in 1831. The genus and species name refer to its natural habitat: rock crevices. Two subspecies are accepted:

- Petrorhagia saxifraga subsp. gasparrinii (Guss.) Pignatti ex Greuter & Burdet – Sicily
- Petrorhagia saxifraga subsp. saxifraga (L.) Link
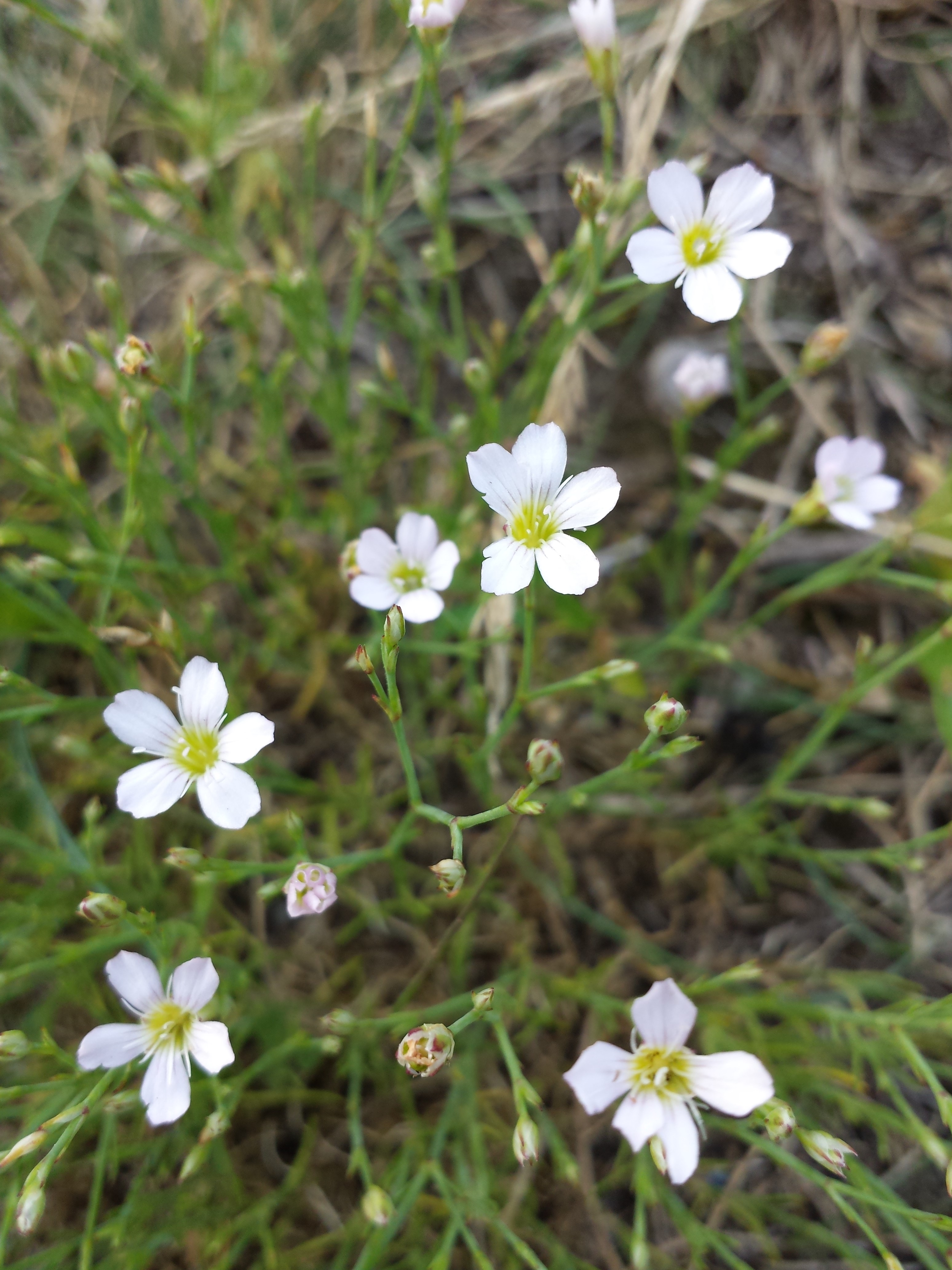
Inflorescence

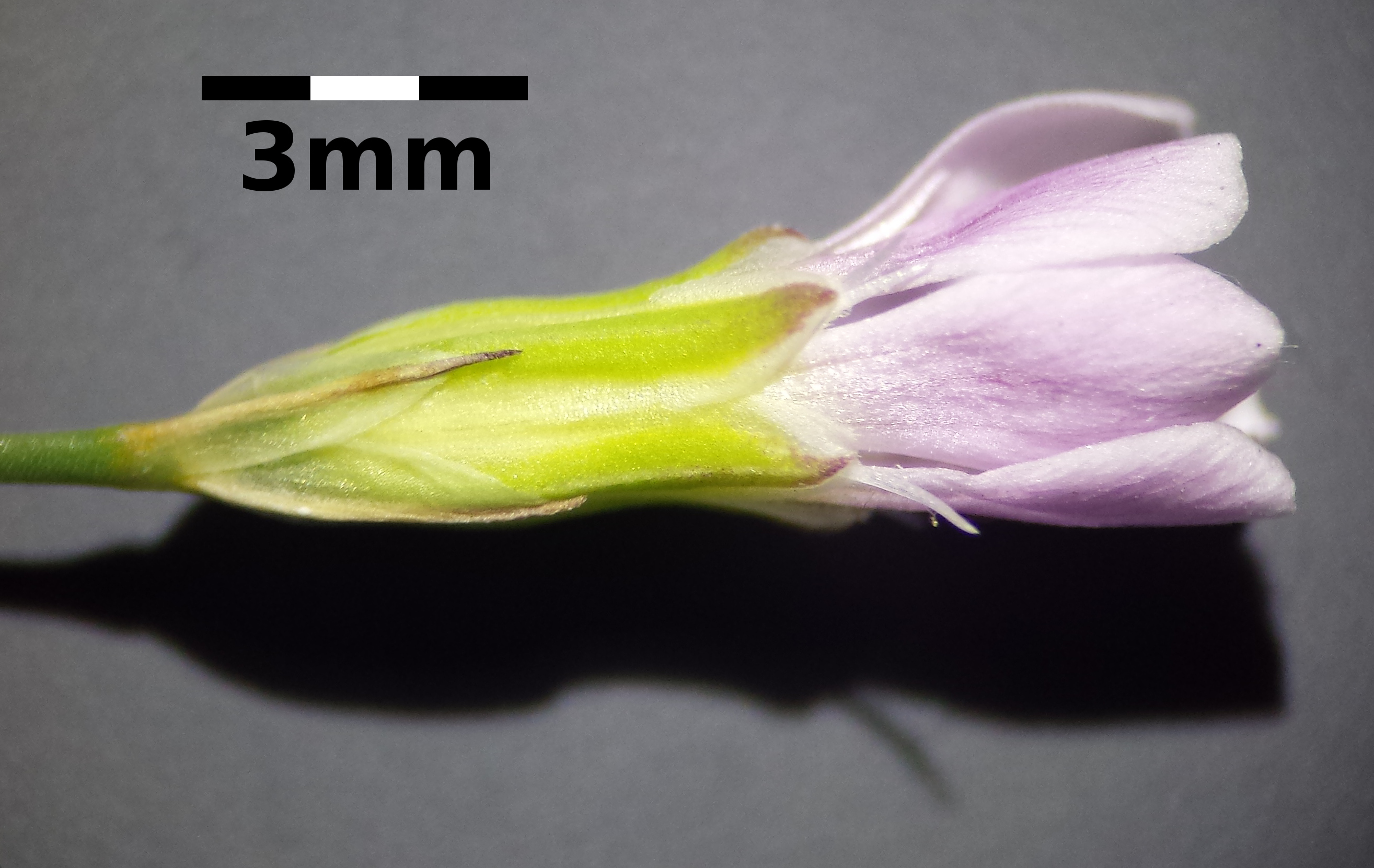
Flower detail

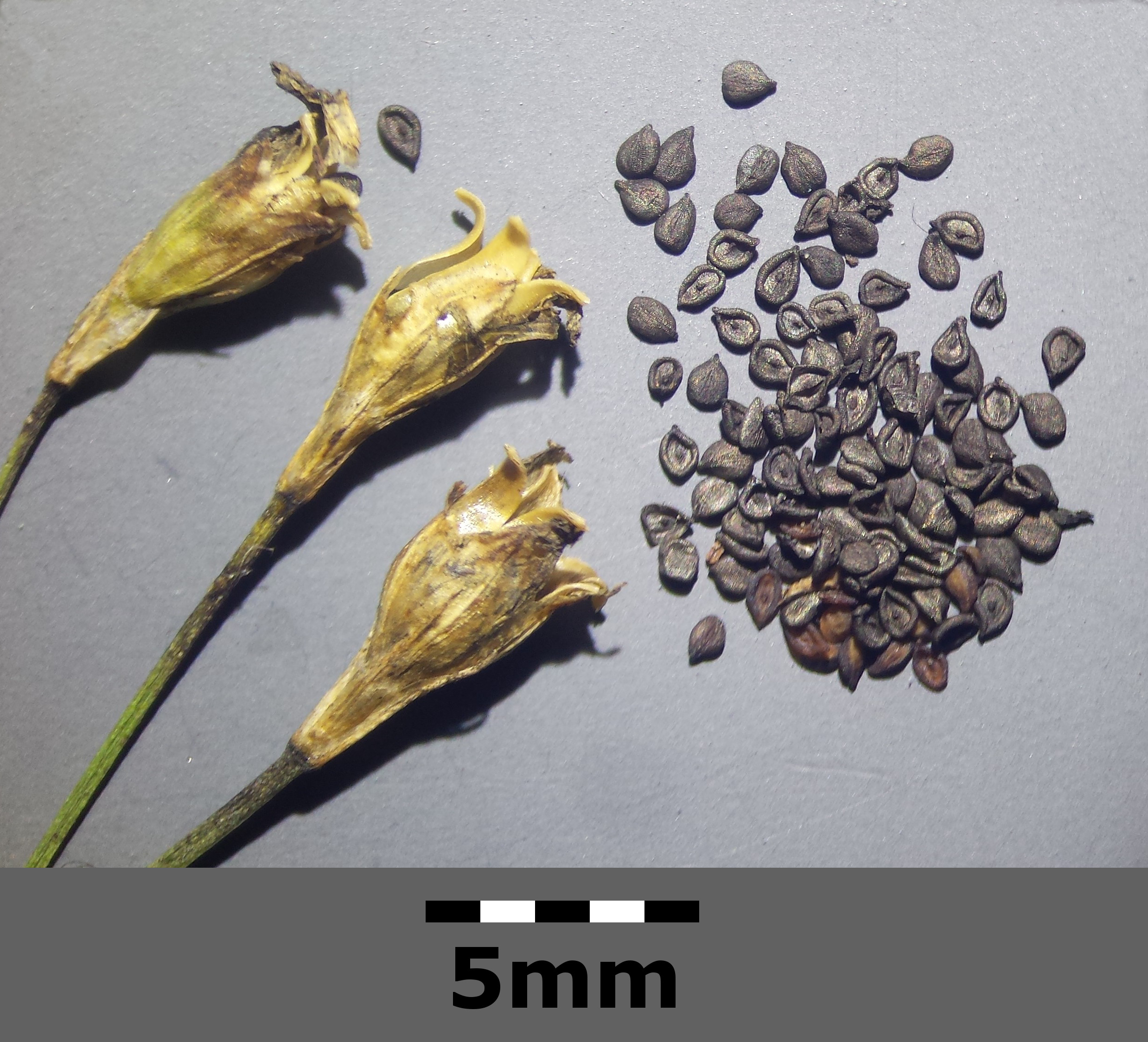
Fruits and seeds
