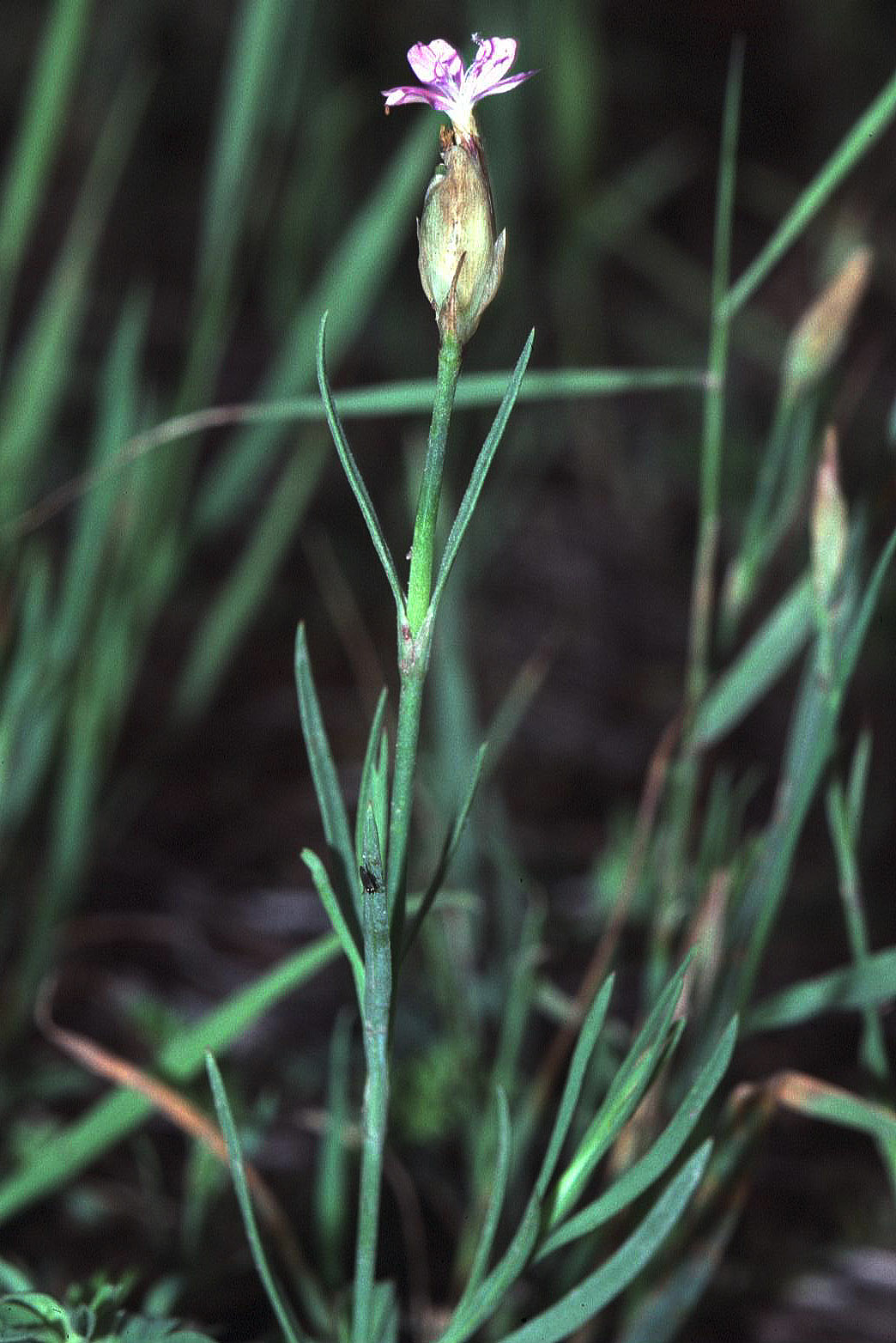

Scientific classification
- Kingdom: Plantae
- Clade: Tracheophytes
- Clade: Angiosperms
- Clade: Eudicots
- Order: Caryophyllales
- Family: Caryophyllaceae
- Genus: Petrorhagia
- Species: P. prolifera

Binomial name
- Petrorhagia prolifera (L.) P.W.Ball & Heywood

= Petrorhagia prolifera =

Species of flowering plant

Petrorhagia prolifera is a species of flowering plant belonging to the family Caryophyllaceae.

Its native range is Europe to Iran, Northwestern Africa.
