= John Isaac Briquet =

Swiss botanist

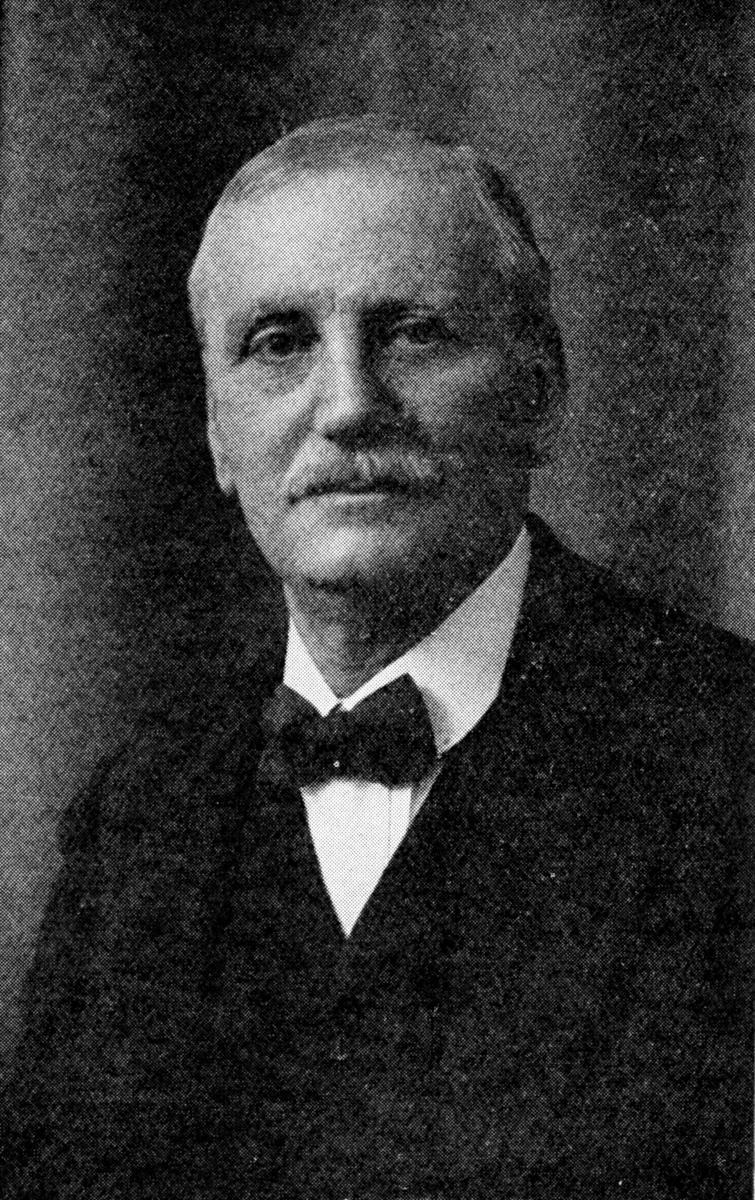

John Isaac Briquet (13 March 1870 in Geneva – 26 October 1931 in Geneva) was a Swiss botanist, director of the Conservatoire Botanique at Geneva.

He received his education in natural sciences at Geneva and Berlin, and studied botany with Simon Schwendener, Adolf Engler, Marc Thury, Johannes Müller Argoviensis, and Alphonse de Candolle. In 1896 he became a curator at the Conservatoire Botanique, later serving as its director (1906–1931). From 1912 to 1921, he was president of the Swiss Botanical Society.

Between 1895 and 1917, with Émile Burnat, he participated in a number of botanical trips, journeying to Corsica, Dalmatia, the Maritime Alps (France and Italy), Montenegro, et al.

Besides his floristic work, he had a particular interest in the genus Galeopsis, and family Lamiaceae (Labiatae). He is especially remembered for his contributions to the "Rules of Nomenclature", the precursors of the modern International Code of Nomenclature for algae, fungi, and plants, with which he took a leading role from 1900, at a time when four sets of rules were competing for acceptance:

... for more than 30 years [he] was to take de Candolle's place as the leader in nomenclatural matters and ... by his clear-headedness, good nature, and judicial attitude was to contribute much to the solution of their problems.

== Selected works ==
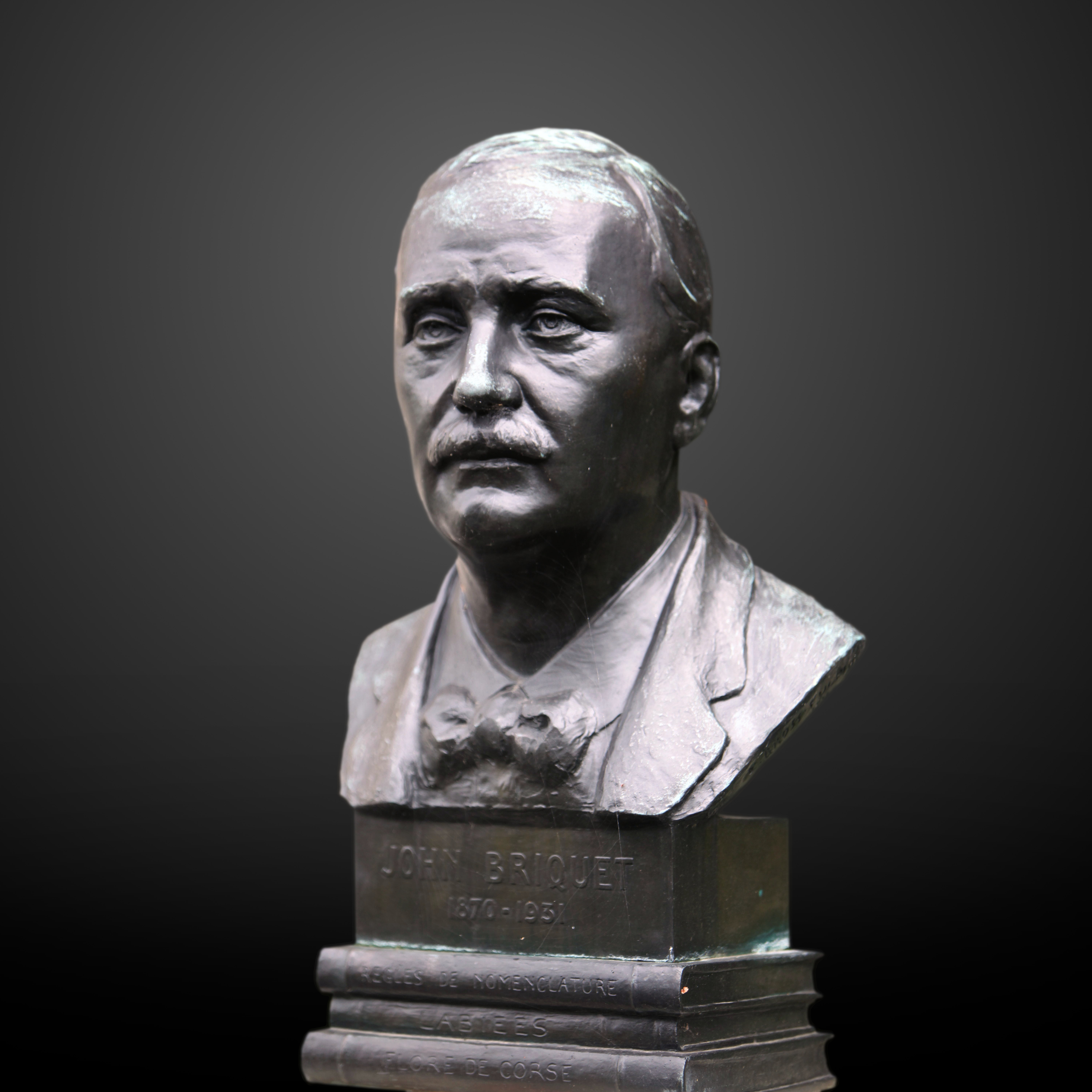
Bust of John Isaac Briquet by Elisabeth Gross-Fulpius, on display on the grounds of the Conservatory and Botanical Garden of the City of Geneva.

- Flore des Alpes Maritimes, 7 volumes (with Émile Burnat and François Cavillier); 1892–1931; Flora of the Maritime Alps.
- Monographie du genre Galeopsis, 1893 – Monograph on the genus Galeopsis.
- Études sur les Cytises des Alpes maritimes, 1894 – Studies of Cytisus of the Maritime Alps.
- Biographies de botanistes suisses, 1906 – Biographies of Swiss botanists.
- Prodrome de la flore Corse, comprenant les résultats botaniques de six voyages exécutés en Corse sour les auspices de M. Emile Burnat, 1910 (with René Verriet de Litardière) – Prodome of Corsican flora.
