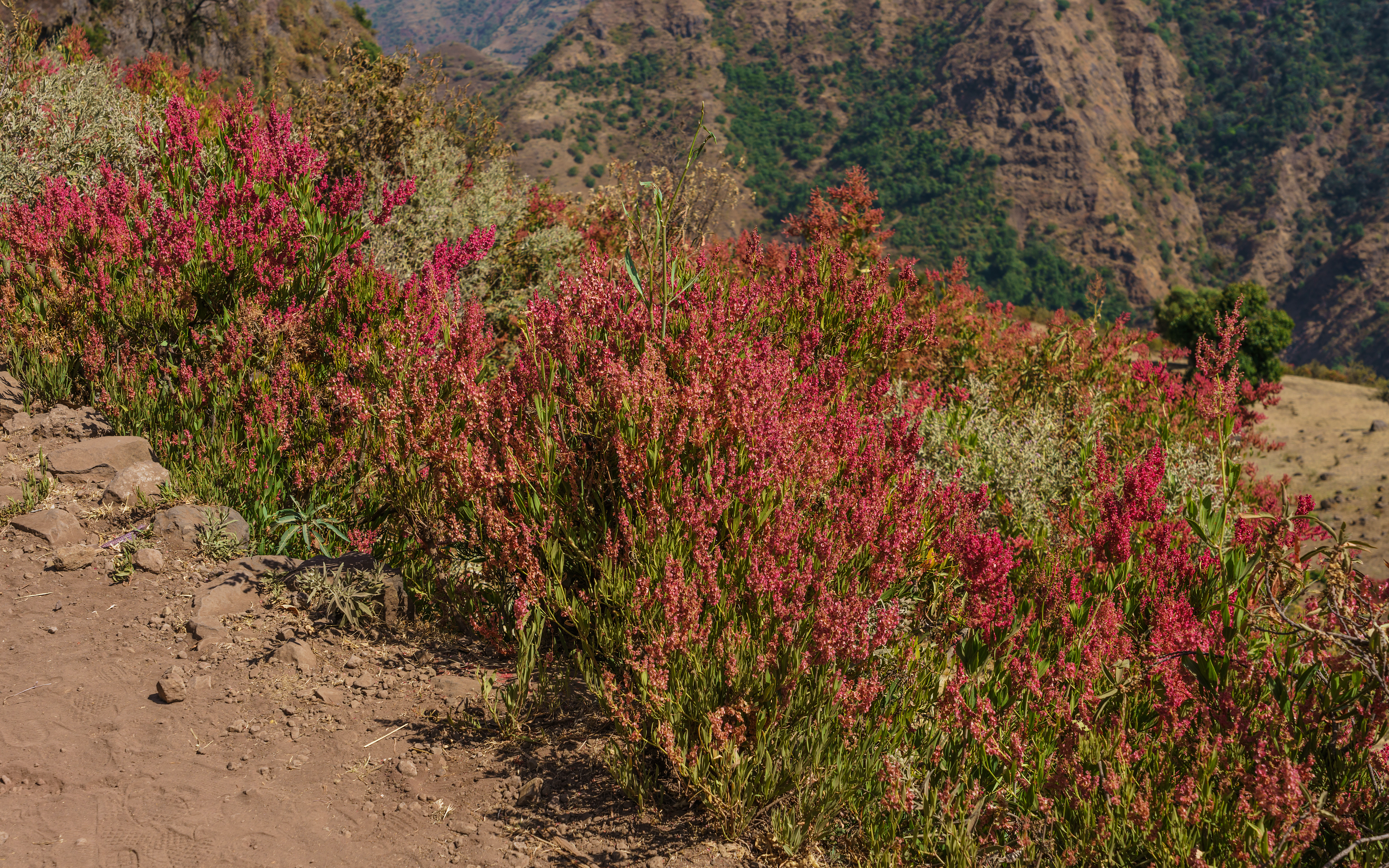
- Growing near Gondar, Ethiopia

Scientific classification
- Kingdom: Plantae
- Clade: Tracheophytes
- Clade: Angiosperms
- Clade: Eudicots
- Order: Caryophyllales
- Family: Polygonaceae
- Genus: Rumex
- Species: R. abyssinicus

Binomial name
- Rumex abyssinicus Jacq.

Synonyms
- Acetosa abyssinica (Jacq.) Á.Löve & B.M.Kapoor; Rumex arifolius L.f., non All.; Rumex schimperi Meisn.

= Rumex abyssinicus =

Species of flowering plant

Rumex abyssinicus is a species of flowering plant in the family Polygonaceae, native to tropical Africa, including Madagascar.

== Taxonomy ==
Rumex abyssinicus was first described by Nikolaus von Jacquin in 1777. R. arifolius L.f. is a synonym of this species. (R. arifolius All. is a different species, regarded as either a synonym of R. hispanicus, or of R. alpestris.)
