= Rumex fascicularis =

Scientific classification
- Kingdom: Plantae
- Clade: Tracheophytes
- Clade: Angiosperms
- Clade: Eudicots
- Order: Caryophyllales
- Family: Polygonaceae
- Genus: Rumex
- Species: R. fascicularis

Binomial name
- Rumex fascicularis Small

Species of flowering plant

Rumex fascicularis is a plant from the family Polygonaceae. This specific plant species experiences perennial growth and is originally found in North Carolina. Rumex fascicularis is from the genus Rumex, which are herbs and it is commonly seen growing near swamps, shores of rivers and lakes.

== Description ==
Rumex species are known to grow their tuberous roots in a cluster that ranges from 3–5 cm. Rumex fascicularis is closely related to Rumex verticillatus and Rumex floridanus. It is especially characterized by its taproots, with broad crenate leaves and are generally hermaphrodites. These leaves have teeth like or jagged edges. The leaves, like the roots, are clustered and are unique in shape. There is an inflorescence (petals, sepals and flower all attached at one point on the stem) and as a result of the weak stems, tends to hang over to the side. The stems of the plant are generally weak and grow up to 6 cm but are thicker at the bases. The floral arrangement of Rumex fascicularis goes up to 20 whorls, starting as low as 10. Rumex fascicularis is an angiosperm (flowering plant) whose fruit is slender and very dense.

== Distribution ==
Rumex fascicularis can be found growing in swampy areas or along the shores of rivers. In the swamps there is little to no water movement. A sample of this plant discovered by G.V. Nash, was found in Florida along swamps and shorelines. The soil found in the swamp areas have a high nutrient content and may be washed by salt or fresh water. Today Rumex fascicularis can be found in Georgia, Texas and from Ft Smith to Rio Grande all the way to the south of Florida.
