= Winged dock =

Winged dock is a common name for several plants and may refer to:

- Rumex spiralis
- Rumex venosus, native to central and western North America
