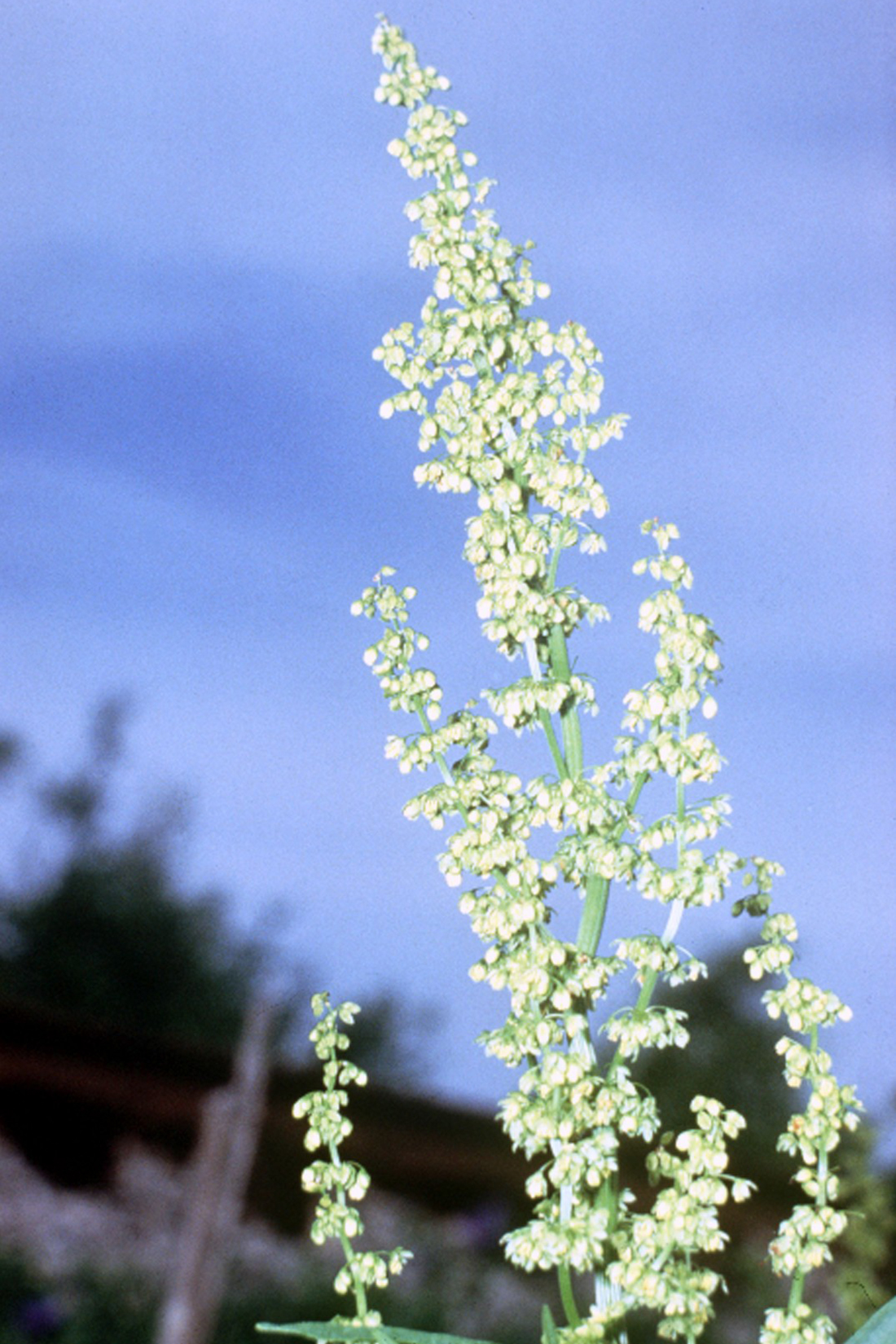
- Inflorescence
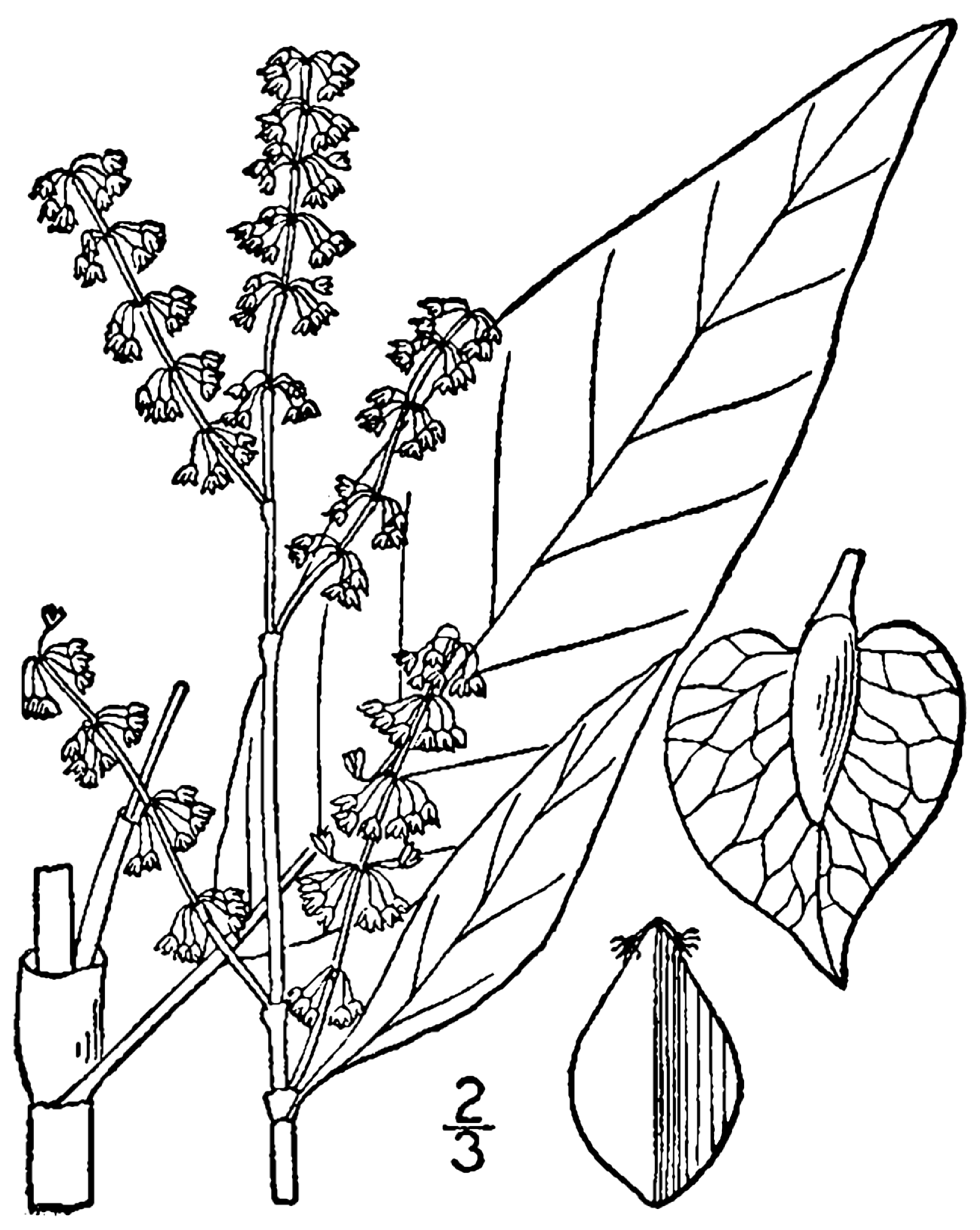
- Botanical illustration

Scientific classification
- Kingdom: Plantae
- Clade: Tracheophytes
- Clade: Angiosperms
- Clade: Eudicots
- Order: Caryophyllales
- Family: Polygonaceae
- Genus: Rumex
- Species: R. altissimus

Binomial name
- Rumex altissimus Alph.Wood

Synonyms
- Lapathum altissimum (Alph.Wood) Nieuwl.

= Rumex altissimus =

Species of plant

Rumex altissimus, the pale dock, is a widespread species of flowering plant in the family Polygonaceae, native to southern Ontario, the United States east of the Rockies (except Montana and North Dakota), and northern Mexico. A perennial of rich wet to mesic soils, and reaching 4 ft (1.2 m) with yellowish-green to green flowers, it is wind-pollinated.
