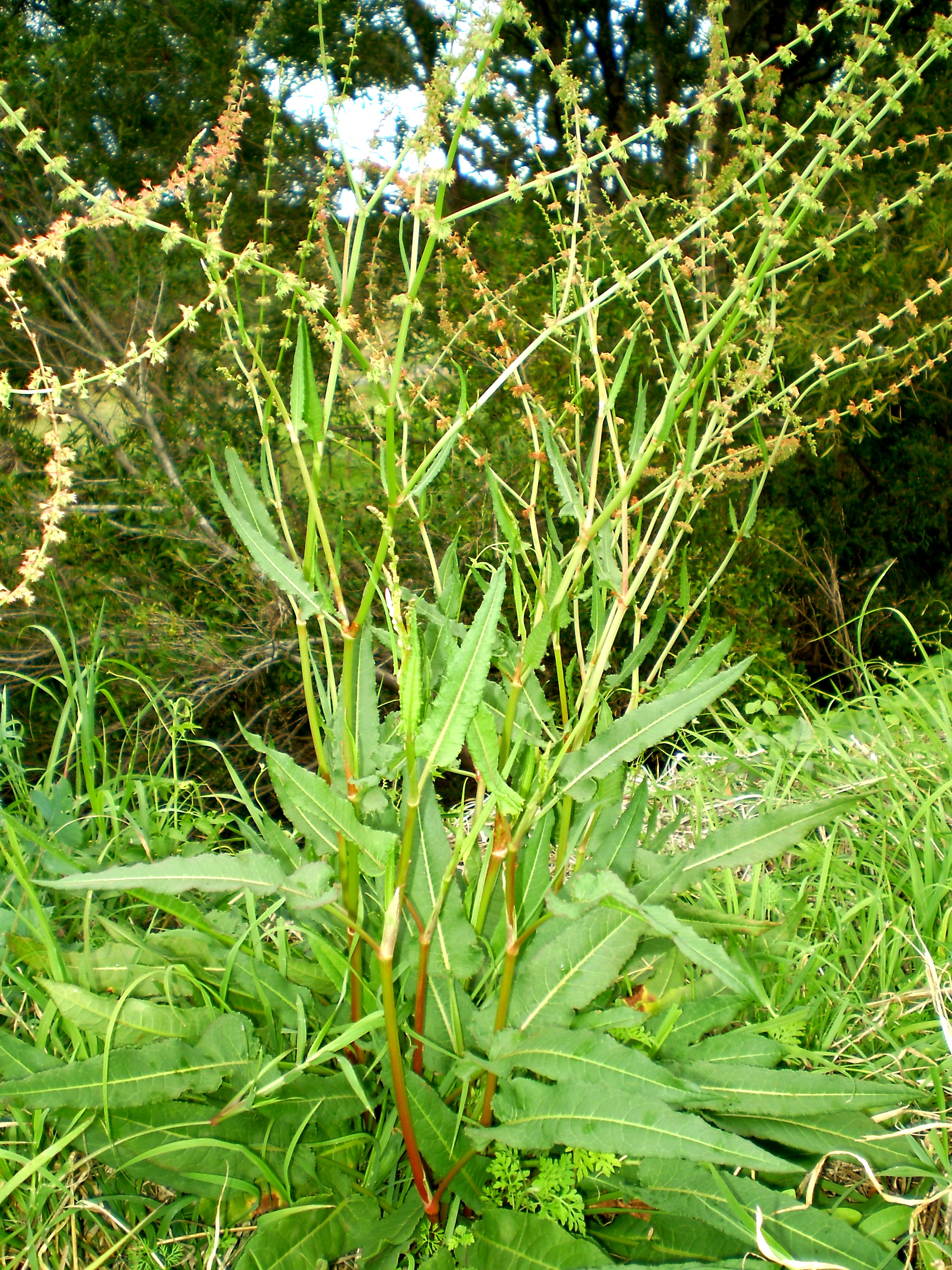

Scientific classification
- Kingdom: Plantae
- Clade: Tracheophytes
- Clade: Angiosperms
- Clade: Eudicots
- Order: Caryophyllales
- Family: Polygonaceae
- Genus: Rumex
- Species: R. brownii

Binomial name
- Rumex brownii Campd.

Synonyms
- Rumex alcockii Rech.f.; Rumex brownei orth. var.

= Rumex brownii =

Species of herb

Rumex brownii, the hooked dock, Browne's dock or swamp dock, is a leafy perennial herb native to Australia, and is widespread and grows in disturbed sites. It is an introduced weed in the Pacific Islands, England, Japan, and New Zealand.

It is 50–80 cm high with variably shaped basal leaves, oblong or lanceolate, to 12 cm long, and to 4 cm wide with cordate to truncate base. The petiole is about half as long as the lamina. Flower whorls with 3–5 hooked teeth on each side and with a hooked tip. The hooks aid seed dispersal via attaching to animal fur and hair, and also human clothing.

== Uses ==
Leaf used as a blanched leafy vegetable.
