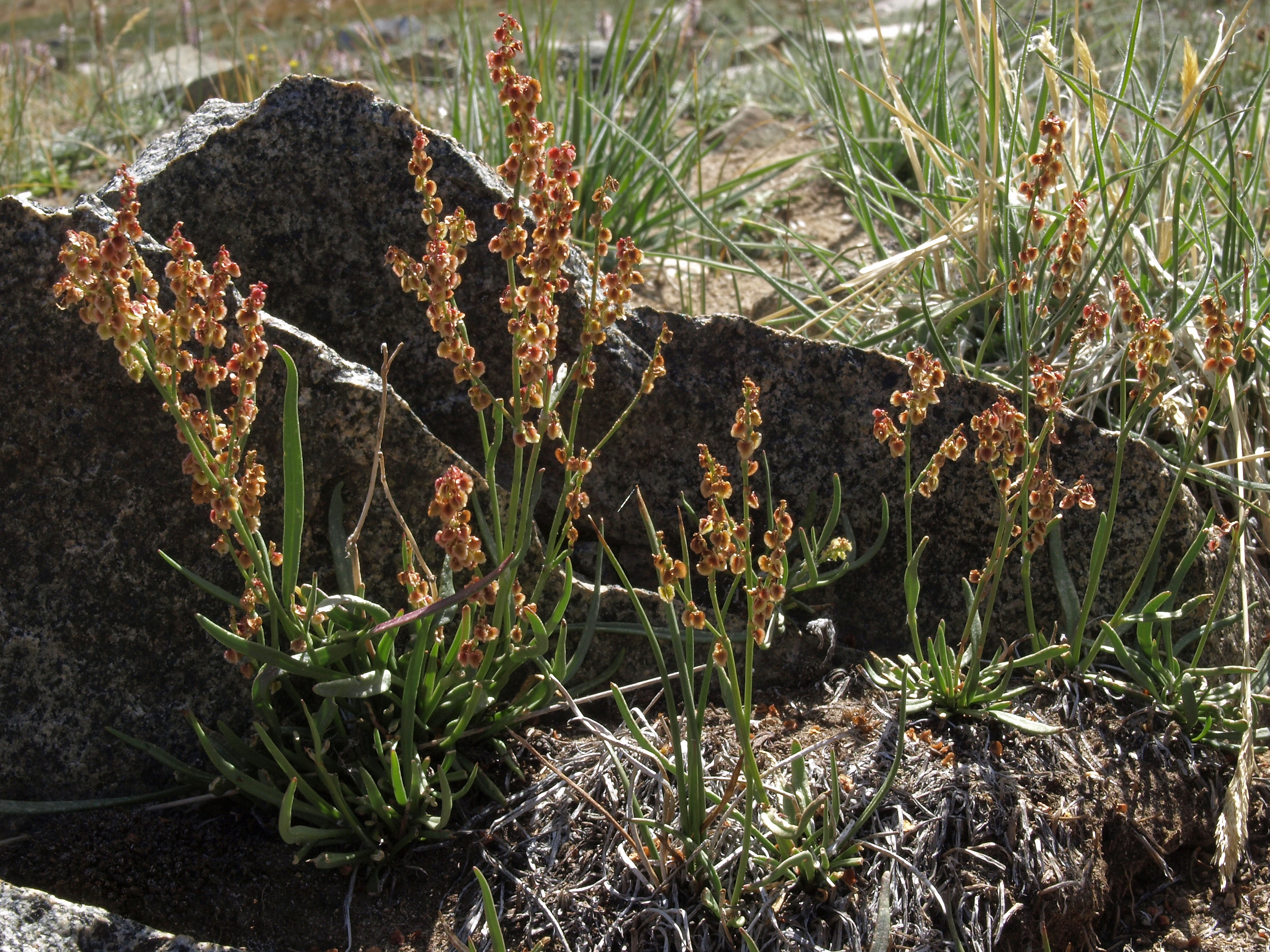

Scientific classification
- Kingdom: Plantae
- Clade: Tracheophytes
- Clade: Angiosperms
- Clade: Eudicots
- Order: Caryophyllales
- Family: Polygonaceae
- Genus: Rumex
- Species: R. paucifolius

Binomial name
- Rumex paucifolius Nutt.

= Rumex paucifolius =

Species of flowering plant

Rumex paucifolius is a species of flowering plant in the knotweed family known by the common name alpine sheep sorrel.

It is native to western North America from southwestern Canada to California to Colorado, where it grows in moist areas in mountainous habitat, up to areas of alpine climate.

Rumex gracilescens is a variant endemic to Turkey. It was on the IUCN Species Survival Commissions 1997 Red List of Threatened Plants.

== Description ==
Rumex paucifolius is a variable plant, taking many different forms depending on environment and genetics; even the chromosome count is quite variable. In addition, it easily hybridizes with other Rumex. In general, it is a perennial herb producing a cluster of slender, erect stems growing to roughly half a meter in maximum height.

Most of the leaves are basal. They are lance-shaped or linear and reach 9 centimeters in length.

The inflorescence is an erect or bending series of many clusters of flowers, some of them widely spaced. Most specimens are dioecious, with male and female flowers occurring on separate plants. The flowers are usually red and hang from pedicels, with several flowers to a cluster.
