= Rumex cristatus =

Scientific classification
- Kingdom: Plantae
- Clade: Tracheophytes
- Clade: Angiosperms
- Clade: Eudicots
- Order: Caryophyllales
- Family: Polygonaceae
- Genus: Rumex
- Species: R. cristatus

Binomial name
- Rumex cristatus DC.

Synonyms
- Rumex graecus

Species of plant

Rumex cristatus, the Greek dock, is a species of perennial herb in the family Polygonaceae.

== Sources ==
This article incorporates text from a free content work. Licensed under CC0 (license statement/permission). Text taken from Rumex cristatus. Encyclopedia of Life.
