= Rumex utahensis =

Scientific classification
- Kingdom: Plantae
- Clade: Tracheophytes
- Clade: Angiosperms
- Clade: Eudicots
- Order: Caryophyllales
- Family: Polygonaceae
- Genus: Rumex
- Species: R. utahensis

Binomial name
- Rumex utahensis Rech.f.

Species of flowering plant

Rumex utahensis is a flowering plant species in the family Polygonaceae. The common name for this species is Utah dock. It is a dicot, perennial herb that is native to the United States, growing only in the West.

== Description ==
Rumex utahensis is a dicot, perennial, hairless herb with stems that erect and commonly produce axillary shoots below proximal inflorescence. The blades of the leaves are linear to lanceolate, which are 6-15 cm and 2-3 cm wide. The pedicels are usually coupled near base, thread-like but thickened distally and joints are evidently swollen. Flowers are 10-25 in whorls with inner perianth lobes that are 2.5-3 mm × 2.5-3 mm wide. The base of the tepals are truncate. The achenes or fruit of the plant are dark reddish-brown or almost black.

== Distribution ==
Rumex utahensis occurs in the Western United States: California, Colorado, Idaho, Montana, Nevada, Oregon, Utah, and Wyoming. It can be found distributed in rivers, streams, wet meadows and rocky slopes. Rumex utahensis typically grows in late spring-summer.

== Uses ==
There are currently no uses.
