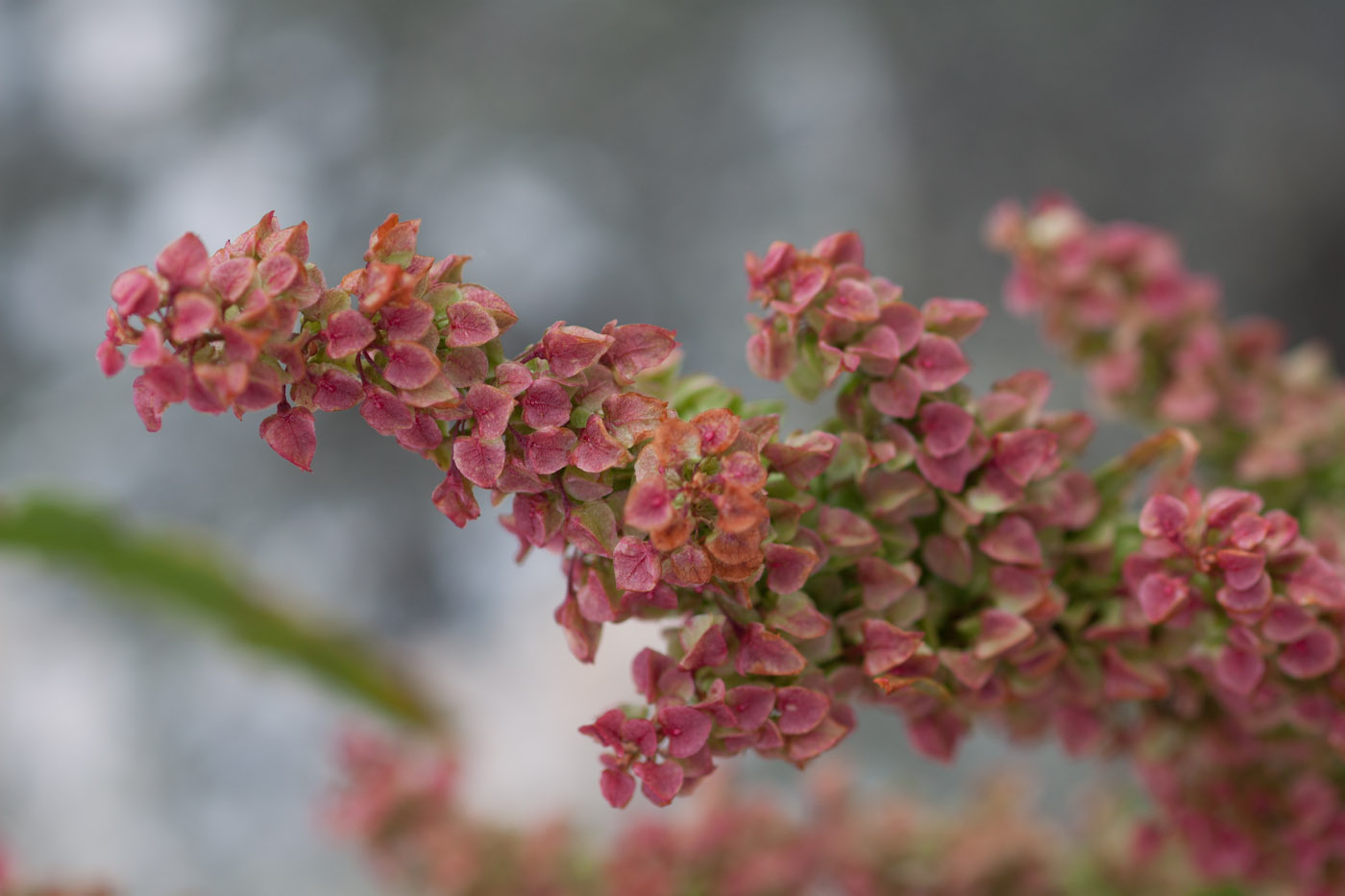

Scientific classification
- Kingdom: Plantae
- Clade: Tracheophytes
- Clade: Angiosperms
- Clade: Eudicots
- Order: Caryophyllales
- Family: Polygonaceae
- Genus: Rumex
- Species: R. pseudonatronatus

Binomial name
- Rumex pseudonatronatus (Borbás) Borbás ex Murb.

Synonyms
- Rumex domesticus var. pseudonatronatus Borbás; Rumex fennicus (Murb.) Murb.; Rumex pseudonatronatus subsp. fennicus Murb.

= Rumex pseudonatronatus =

Species of flowering plant

Rumex pseudonatronatus, common name field dock or Finnish dock, is a plant species native to northern Europe and northern Asia, known from Asiatic and European Russia, China, Mongolia, Kazakhstan, Kyrgyzstan, Finland, Norway, Sweden, Belgium, Netherlands, Estonia, Latvia, Lithuania, Poland, Belarus, etc. It is naturalized in much of Canada and to the north-central United States. It is known from every Canadian province from Québec to British Columbia, plus Yukon, North Dakota, South Dakota and Minnesota. It grows in wet and/or disturbed sites along stream banks, lake shores, roadsides, ditches, cultivated fields, meadows, etc.

Rumex pseudonatronatus is a perennial herb. Stems are erect, up to 150 cm tall, often branching above the middle. Leaves are lanceolate, up to 30 cm long. The inflorescence typically takes up the upper half of the shoot, the flowers green, pink or red, in whorls of up to 30 flowers. Achenes are reddish-brown, up to 3 mm long.
