= Rumex orthoneurus =

Conservation status
- Vulnerable (NatureServe)

Scientific classification
- Kingdom: Plantae
- Clade: Tracheophytes
- Clade: Angiosperms
- Clade: Eudicots
- Order: Caryophyllales
- Family: Polygonaceae
- Genus: Rumex
- Species: R. orthoneurus

Binomial name
- Rumex orthoneurus Rech.f.

Species of flowering plant

Rumex orthoneurus is a species of flowering plant in the knotweed family known by the common names Chiricahua Mountain dock and Blumer's dock. It is native to western North America, where it can be found in Arizona, New Mexico, and Sonora.

This large rhizomatous perennial herb may reach one to two meters in height. The semi-succulent basal leaves may be up to 45 centimeters long. One distinguishing characteristic is the veining on the leaves, with secondary veins extending perpendicular to the midvein. Leaves higher on the stem are smaller and more pointed. The inflorescence is a dense panicle occupying the upper half of the stem. Flowering occurs in July and August.

This species grows in mountain and forest wetland habitat, such as meadows and streambanks. It may grow alongside Rumex occidentalis, a closely related species often confused with it. Other species in the habitat include Hymenoxys hoopesii, Carex spp., and Juncus spp.

This species is threatened by livestock, which relish the semi-succulent leaves. It is also threatened by recreational activity in the habitat.
