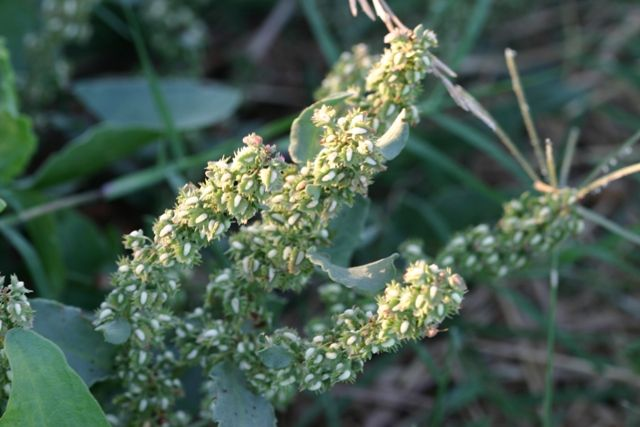

Scientific classification
- Kingdom: Plantae
- Clade: Tracheophytes
- Clade: Angiosperms
- Clade: Eudicots
- Order: Caryophyllales
- Family: Polygonaceae
- Genus: Rumex
- Species: R. stenophyllus

Binomial name
- Rumex stenophyllus Ledeb.

= Rumex stenophyllus =

Species of flowering plant

Rumex stenophyllus is a species of flowering plant in the knotweed family known by the common name narrow-leaf dock. It is native to Eurasia and it can be found in parts of North America as an introduced species and roadside weed. It grows in moist and wet habitat, often in areas with saline soils. It is a perennial herb producing an erect stem from a thick taproot, usually measuring 40 to 80 centimeters tall, but known to well exceed one meter. The leaves are up to 30 centimeters long and are generally lance-shaped with curled edges. The inflorescence is an interrupted series of clusters of flowers with 20 to 25 in each cluster, each flower hanging from a pedicel. The flower has usually six tepals, the inner three of which are largest, triangular and edged with teeth, and bearing tubercles.
