= Rumex lapponicus =

Scientific classification
- Kingdom: Plantae
- Clade: Tracheophytes
- Clade: Angiosperms
- Clade: Eudicots
- Order: Caryophyllales
- Family: Polygonaceae
- Genus: Rumex
- Species: R. lapponicus

Binomial name
- Rumex lapponicus (Hiitonen) Czernov

Species of flowering plant

Rumex lapponicus, known commonly as Lapland mountain sorrel is a perennial flowering herb species in the family Polygonaceae. It is commonly found in meadows and rock outcrops, as well as montane, arenicolous, and alluvial habitats.

== Description ==
Rumex lapponicus is a herbaceous perennial plant with several or a single branched erect stem. Branching in the distal portion of the stem and inflorescence differentiates R. lapponicus from other species of Rumex, namely R. acetosa, of which R. lapponicus was initially mischaracterized as a subspecies. It has stems usually reaching 20-60 centimeters (8-24 inches) high, and broadly ovate, terminally sagittate leaves that are 3–10 cm long and 1–4 cm wide. It is dioecious.

== Distribution ==
Rumex lapponicus occurs between 0–2500 meters in elevation in montane and submontane meadow and outcrop environments throughout Canada (British Columbia, Alberta, Yukon, and the Northwest Territories), the United States (Montana, Wyoming, and Alaska), Greenland, and throughout North Eurasia. It is most successful in silty, fine soils along rivers and streams in montane and tundra zones.

== Taxonomy ==
Rumex lapponicus belongs to the genus Rumex, known commonly as the docks or sorrels, and is placed in the subfamily Polygonoideae within the family Polygonaceae. It is of the order Caryophyllales, or the buckwheats, and it is a Eudicot. As a result of the aggregation of morphologically distinct montane R. acetosa and R. lapponicus species from the Rocky Mountains to Beartooth Plateau under the name R. alpestris, R. lapponicus was originally thought to be a subspecies of first R. alpestris, then, following nomenclatural studies suggesting R. alpestris to be an ambiguous/polymorphic name, R. acetosa. However, R. lapponicus differs in habit and branching, and exceeds the leaf size of R. acetosa. Additionally, is more closely related to morphologically unique arctic Rumex species, R. pseudoxyria, than any other Rumex member, suggesting independent development as a species from R. acetosa.

== Uses ==
The Norwegian name for Rumex lapponicus, setersyre, has led to some speculation that it was used on Mid-Norwegian summer farms as an acidifying agent. The United States Department of Agriculture has listed Rumex lapponicus as a noxious weed in the state of Arkansas, indicating that members of the genus Rumex "can directly or indirectly injure or cause damage to crops (including nursery stock or plant products), livestock, poultry or other interests of agriculture, irrigation, navigation, the natural resources of the United States, the public health, or the environment", in an official profile on the USDA website, and thus subject to interstate travel restrictions within the US.
