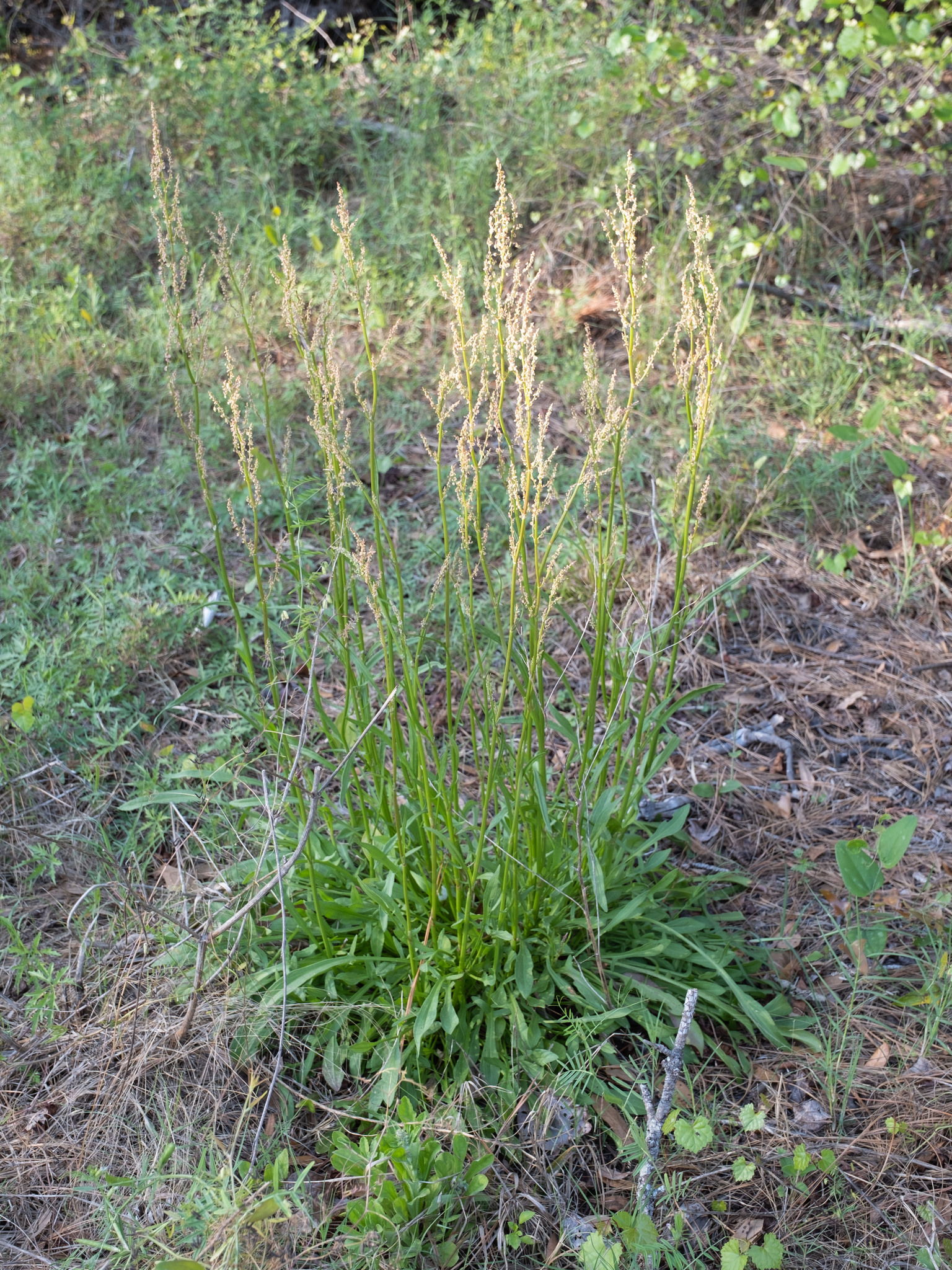

Scientific classification
- Kingdom: Plantae
- Clade: Tracheophytes
- Clade: Angiosperms
- Clade: Eudicots
- Order: Caryophyllales
- Family: Polygonaceae
- Genus: Rumex
- Species: R. hastatulus

Binomial name
- Rumex hastatulus Baldw.

= Rumex hastatulus =

Species of flowering plant

Rumex hastatulus, commonly known as the heartwing sorrel, is an annual flowering plant species in the family Polygonaceae otherwise known as the buckwheat family. It is found spread out throughout the eastern and southern United States.

== Description ==
Rumex hastatulus is an erect herb-like with simple, oblong, alternate leaves ranging from 2–6 cm (0.79–2.36 in) long and 0.5–2 cm (0.20–0.79 in). The flowers are bright red and carried in a branched cluster and are from 2.5–3.2 mm (0.098–0.126 in) long and 2.7–3.2 mm (0.11–0.13 in) wide. The fruit is a brownish orange color. When eaten the leaves flowers and seeds have been described to have a sour taste and are edible in small doses.

Rumex hastatulus is dioecious, with separate male and female plants.

== Distribution ==
The plant is found in the eastern and southeastern parts of North America in areas with alluvial or ruderal habitats such as river valleys meadows and waste areas.

== Uses ==
Despite being known to be poisonous Rumex hastatulus has been commonly used in small doses in different types of salads in parts of and soups. While the culinary uses for the plant are limited due to it being known to cause nausea stomach cramps and headaches in large portions it is at times used in France as a form of "sorrel soup". The plant is also commonly used for study due to its unique genetic structure. Due to their complex chromosomal makeup their sex is determined by the ratio of x and y chromosomes. This gender determination system is unique in flowering plants leading to a lot of research being done into environmental and genetic factors that determine the sex.
