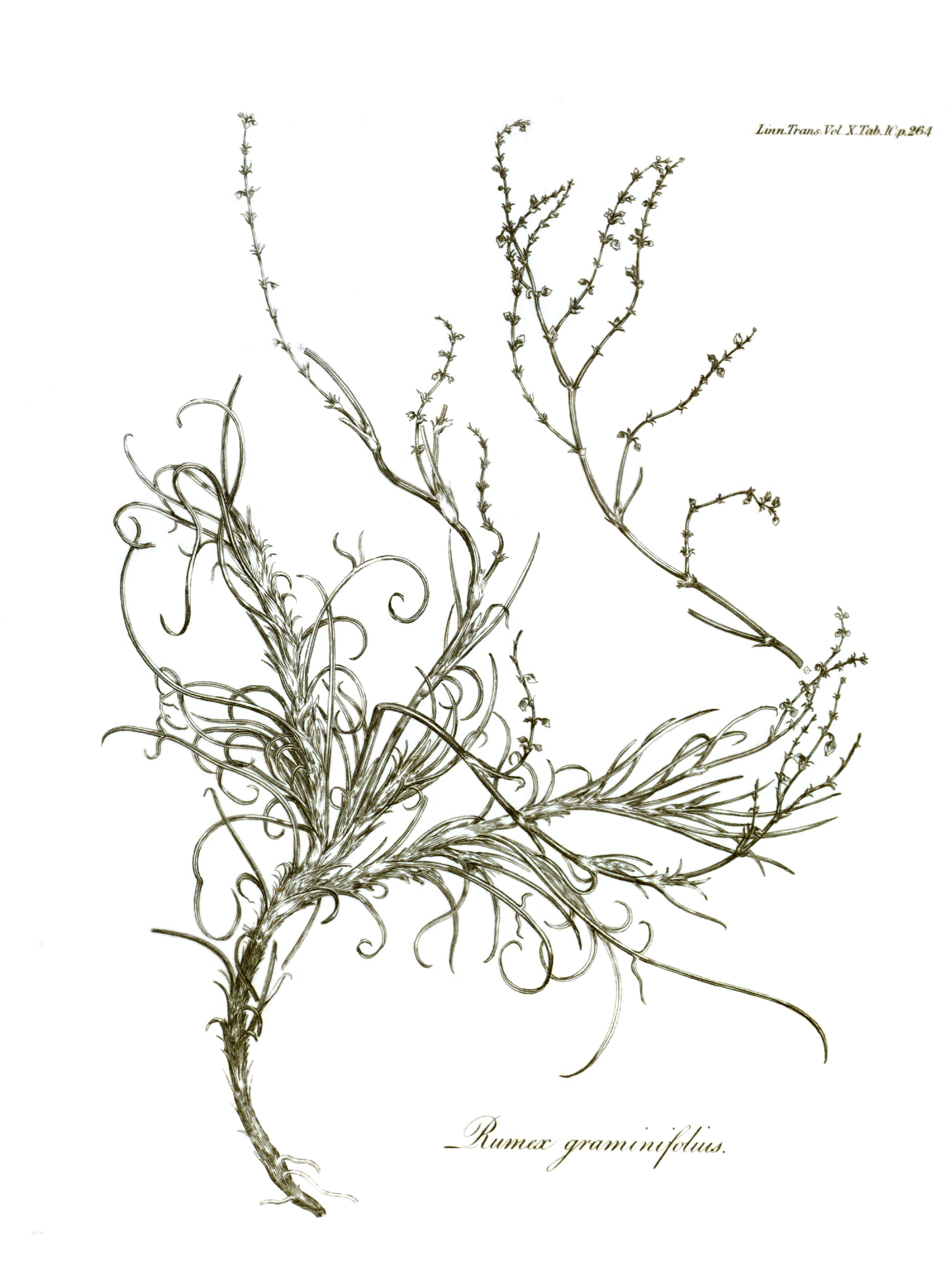
- Grassleaf sorrel

Scientific classification
- Kingdom: Plantae
- Clade: Tracheophytes
- Clade: Angiosperms
- Clade: Eudicots
- Order: Caryophyllales
- Family: Polygonaceae
- Genus: Rumex
- Species: R. graminifolius

Binomial name
- Rumex graminifolius Georgi ex Lamb.

Synonyms
- Acetosella graminifolia A.Löve

= Rumex graminifolius =

Species of sorrel

Rumex graminifolius, common name grassleaf sorrel, is a species of the genus Rumex and the knotweed family Polygonaceae.

== Description ==
Rumex graminifolius is a slender perennial plant that grows from 0.1 m to 0.5 m high, with roots that run right below the surface, as well as a skinny stems and edible pointy, flat leaves. The leaves, when consumed raw, have a bitter taste. The lower leaves have 4 to 6 centimeters in length with long petioles and a membranous ocrea formed of fused, sheathing stipules. The upper ones are inflorescences, flowers and frequently become a bright reddish color. It has whorled spikes of reddish-green flowers, which bloom in late spring-summer.

== Distribution and habitat ==
Rumex graminifolius is found is arctic regions and costal rocks throughout Northern North America, Alaska and North Europe. It can grow in acid, neutral and basic soils yet prefers moist soil. It can also grow in semi-shade or no shade.

== Taxononmy ==
Rudolph, Johann Heinrich. Transactions of the Linnean Society of London 10(2): 264, pl. 10. 1811. (7 Sept 1811)

== Uses ==
This species is generally used as food plants by the larvae of a number of Lepidoptera species, and are the only host plants of Lycaena rubidus.
