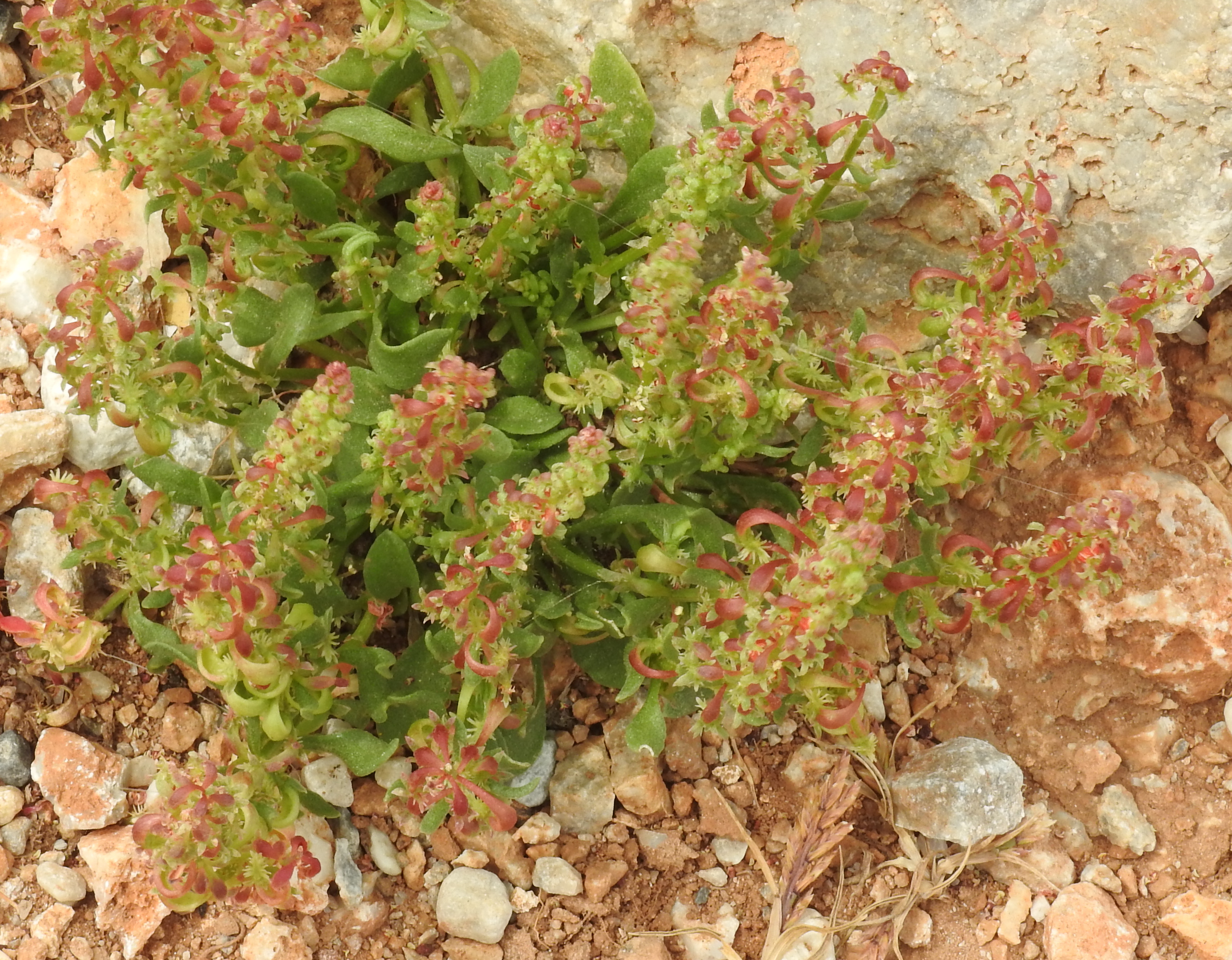

Scientific classification
- Kingdom: Plantae
- Clade: Tracheophytes
- Clade: Angiosperms
- Clade: Eudicots
- Order: Caryophyllales
- Family: Polygonaceae
- Genus: Rumex
- Species: R. bucephalophorus

Binomial name
- Rumex bucephalophorus L.

= Rumex bucephalophorus =

Species of flowering plant

Rumex bucephalophorus, also known as horned, red, or ruby dock is an annual herbaceous plant that is part of the family Polygonaceae. The scientific name Rumex bucephalophorus was first described and published by Linnaeus in 1753 in Species Plantarum. Other scientific names have also been given to Rumex bucephalophorus such as Bucephalophora aculeata and Lapathum bucephalophorum. R. bucephalophorus is most commonly found in subcoastal or coastal regions, but also are "casual aliens", few and far between, among inland populations. Rumex bucephalophorus is native to the Mediterranean Basin and grows best in areas with little human intervention.

== Description ==
The stems of R. bucephalophorus are thin and branch off the base of the plant about 5 to 50 centimeters long. The leaves of the plant vary as they can be circular and ovate or lengthened and lancelate anywhere in between. The pedicels are known to be heteromorphic often distinguishing this plant from others. Flowers are often found in groups of 2 to 3 in clusters and are also often heteromorphic. Like its leaves, the flowers of R. bucephalophorus often vary greatly but are generally triangular and 2–4 mm long.

The Rumex bucephalophorus flowers appear red and blossom between the months of December and May.

== Distribution ==
The genus Rumex is mostly distributed throughout North America and Europe. However, Rumex bucephalophorus flourishes in habitats that are quite sandy and rocky therefore it often is found by the sea. The Atlantic coast of southwestern Europe, the northwestern region of Macaronesia and Morocco, and the coastlands of the Mediterranean Basin are where R. bucephalophorus is most widely distributed.

== Subspecies ==
Rumex bucephalophorus is unique as it is a polymorphic species resulting in 8 different subspecies as well as dozens of variants and subvariants.

- Rumex bucephalophorus ssp. aegaeus
- Rumex bucephalophorus ssp. bucephalophorus
- Rumex bucephalophorus ssp. canariensis
- Rumex bucephalophorus ssp. graecus
- Rumex bucephalophorus ssp. fruticescens
- Rumex bucephalophorus ssp. gallicus
- Rumex bucephalophorus ssp. hipporegii
- Rumex bucephalophorus ssp. hispanicus

== Uses ==
R. bucephalophorus does not have any known uses, but it is an edible plant. There is a danger, however, because its leaves contain a high level of oxalic acid that can be potentially dangerous in large amounts. This oxalic acid gives the leaves an acid-lemon flavor.
