= Rumex kerneri =

Scientific classification
- Kingdom: Plantae
- Clade: Tracheophytes
- Clade: Angiosperms
- Clade: Eudicots
- Order: Caryophyllales
- Family: Polygonaceae
- Genus: Rumex
- Species: R. kerneri

Binomial name
- Rumex kerneri Borbás

Species of flowering plant

Rumex kerneri is a species of flowering plant in the knotweed family known by the common name Kerner's dock. It is native to Europe. It has also been observed in California as an introduced species and roadside weed. It is a perennial herb producing a slender, erect stem from a thick taproot, approaching 1.5 meters in maximum height. The lance-shaped leaves can be up to 25 centimeters long and have smooth, wavy, or wrinkly edges. The inflorescence is an interrupted series of clusters of flowers, with 15 or 20 in each cluster, each flower hanging from a pedicel. The flower has usually six tepals, the inner three of which are largest, about 6 millimeters long, edged with tiny teeth and bearing rounded tubercles in the centers.

This species is sometimes treated as a subspecies of Rumex crispus.
