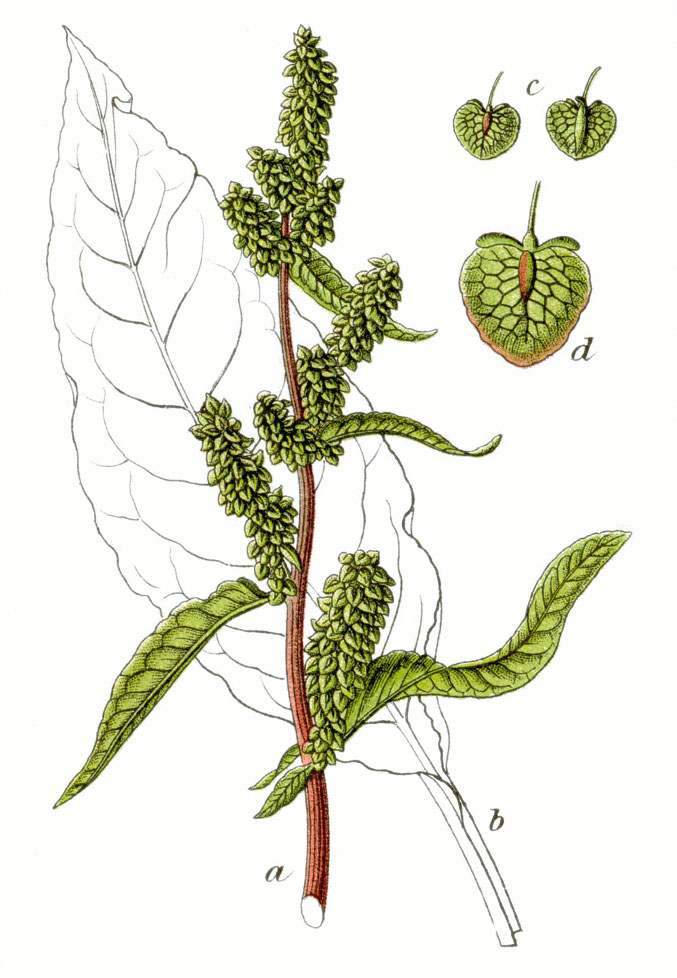
- Patience dock (Rumex patientia)

Scientific classification
- Kingdom: Plantae
- Clade: Tracheophytes
- Clade: Angiosperms
- Clade: Eudicots
- Order: Caryophyllales
- Family: Polygonaceae
- Subfamily: Polygonoideae
- Genus: Rumex; L. 1753

Type species
- Rumex patientia L.

Species
- About 200, see text

Synonyms
- Acetosa Tourn. ex Mill.; Acetosella (Meisn.) Fourr.; Analiton Raf.; Atecosa Raf.; Bucephalophora Pau; Centopodium Burch.; Emex Neck. ex Campd.; Eutralia Raf.; Lapathon Raf.; Lapathum Mill.; Menophyla Raf.; Nemolapathum Ehrh.; Oxylapathon St.-Lag.; Rhodoptera Raf.; Steinmannia Opiz; Tomaris Raf.; Vibo Medik.; Vibones Raf.

= Rumex =

Genus of plants

The docks and sorrels, genus Rumex, are a genus of about 200 species of annual, biennial, and perennial herbs in the buckwheat family, Polygonaceae. Members of this genus are common perennial herbs with a worldwide native distribution in temperate and subtropical climates.

Some are nuisance weeds (and are sometimes called dockweed or dock weed), but some are grown for their edible leaves. Rumex species are used as food plants by the larvae of a number of Lepidoptera species, and are the only host plants of the butterflies Lycaena dispar and Lycaena rubidus.

== Etymology ==
Rumex is from the Latin, meaning to suck, alluding to the practice since Roman times of sucking the leaves to alleviate thirst. The name dock is from the Old English docce, meaning tall weed, and other European languages for bundle or tuft.

== Description ==
They are erect plants, usually with long taproots. The fleshy to leathery leaves form a basal rosette at the root. The basal leaves may be different from those near the inflorescence. They may or may not have stipules. Minor leaf veins occur. The leaf blade margins are entire or crenate.

The usually inconspicuous flowers are carried above the leaves in clusters. The fertile flowers are mostly hermaphrodites, or they may be functionally male or female. The flowers and seeds grow on long clusters at the top of a stalk emerging from the basal rosette; in many species, the flowers are green, but in some (such as sheep's sorrel, Rumex acetosella) the flowers and their stems may be brick-red. Each seed is a three-sided achene, often with a round tubercle on one or all three sides.

== Taxonomy ==
The genus was first described by Carl Linnaeus in 1753. Within the family Polygonaceae, it is placed in the subfamily Polygonoideae. The genus Emex was separated from Rumex by Francisco Campderá in 1819 on the basis that it was polygamous (i.e. had both bisexual and unisexual flowers on the same plant). However, some species of Rumex subg. Acetosa also have this characteristic, and most other features that are supposed to distinguish Emex are found in species of Rumex. Accordingly, in 2015, Schuster et al. demoted Emex to a subgenus of Rumex.

Within the subfamily Polygonoideae, Rumex is placed in the tribe Rumiceae, along with the two genera Oxyria and Rheum. It is most closely related to Rheum, which includes Rhubarb.

- Rumiceae
  - Oxyria
  - - Rumex
    - Rheum

=== Species ===
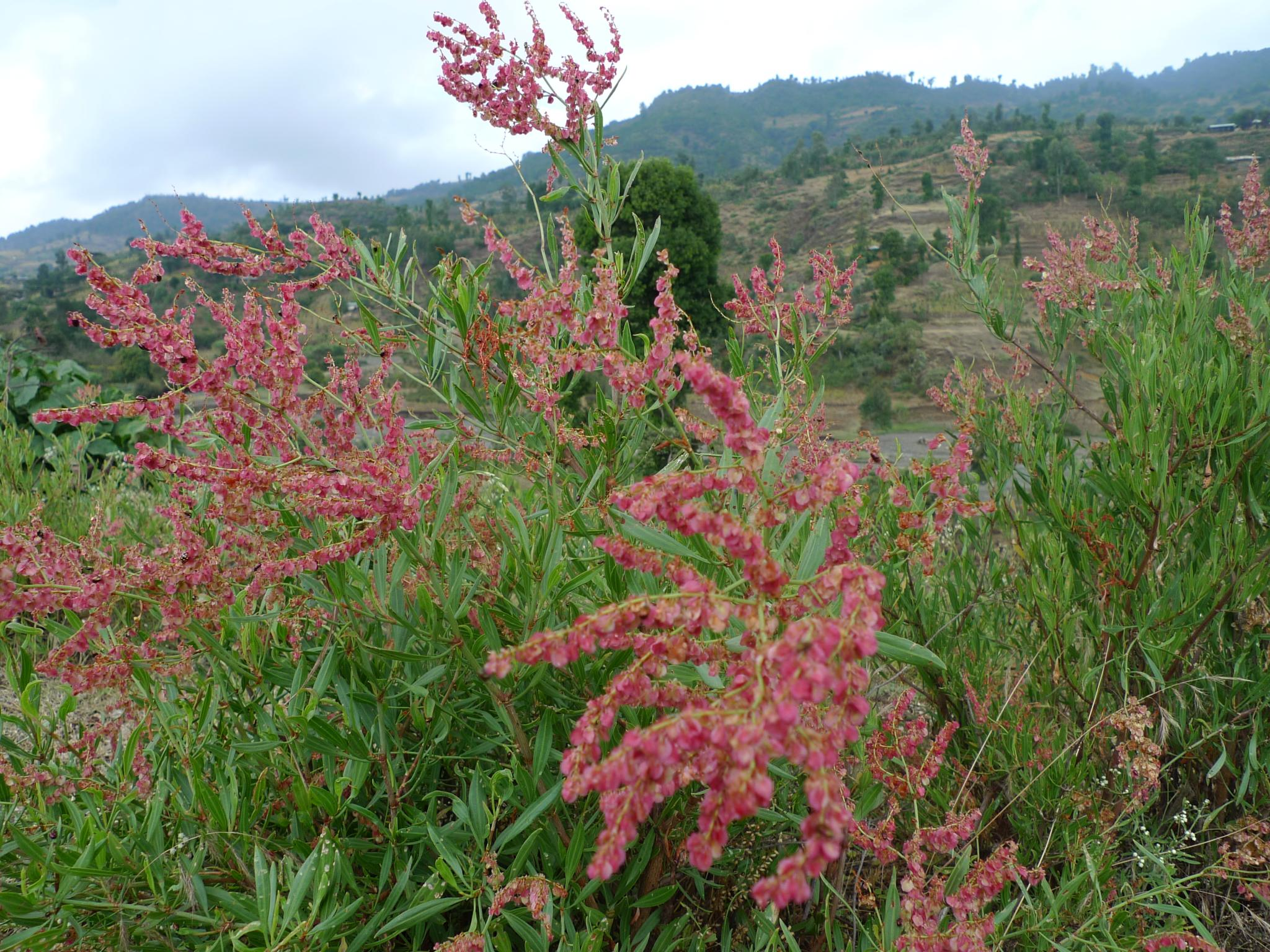
Rumex nervosus in Ethiopia

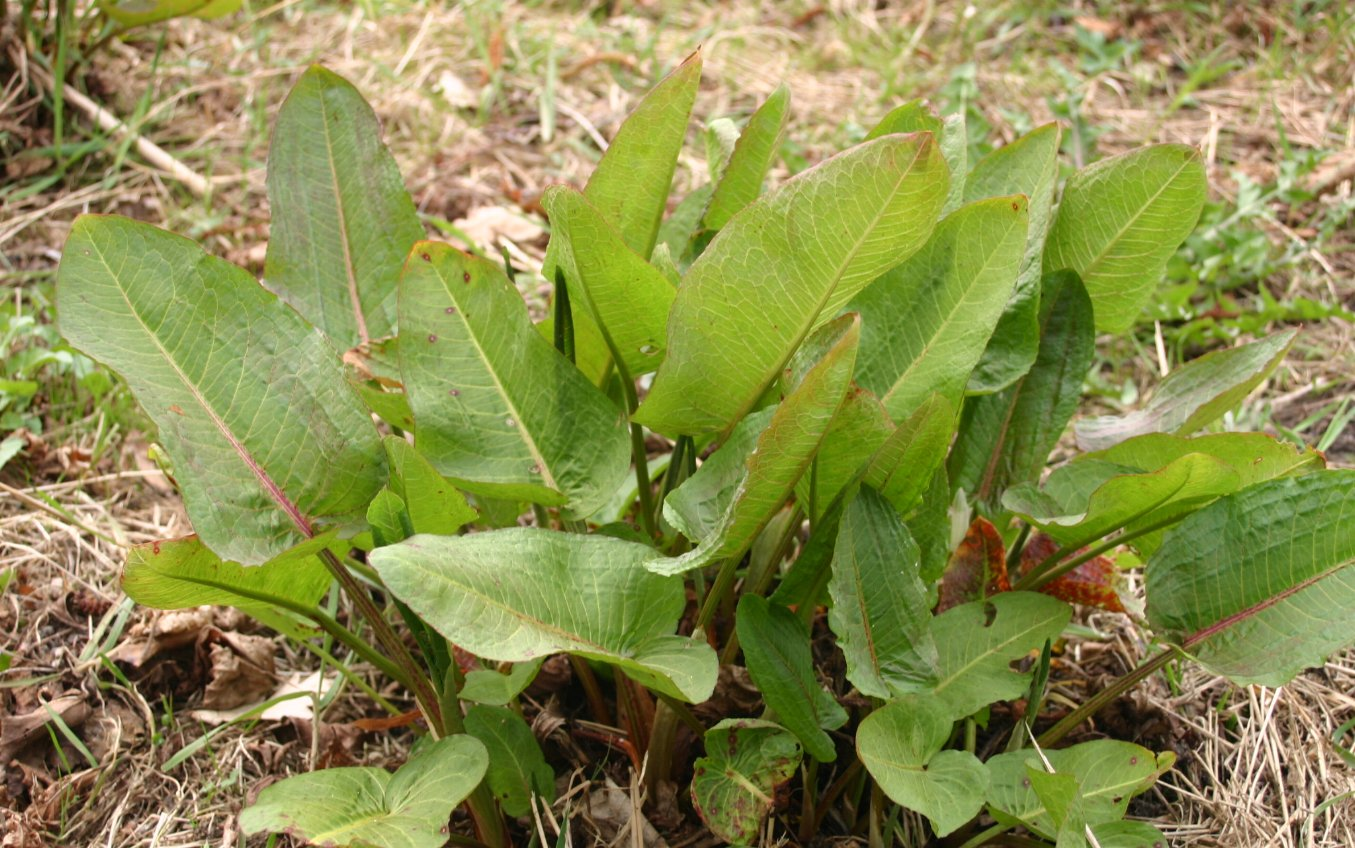
Broad-leaved dock leaves (R. obtusifolius)

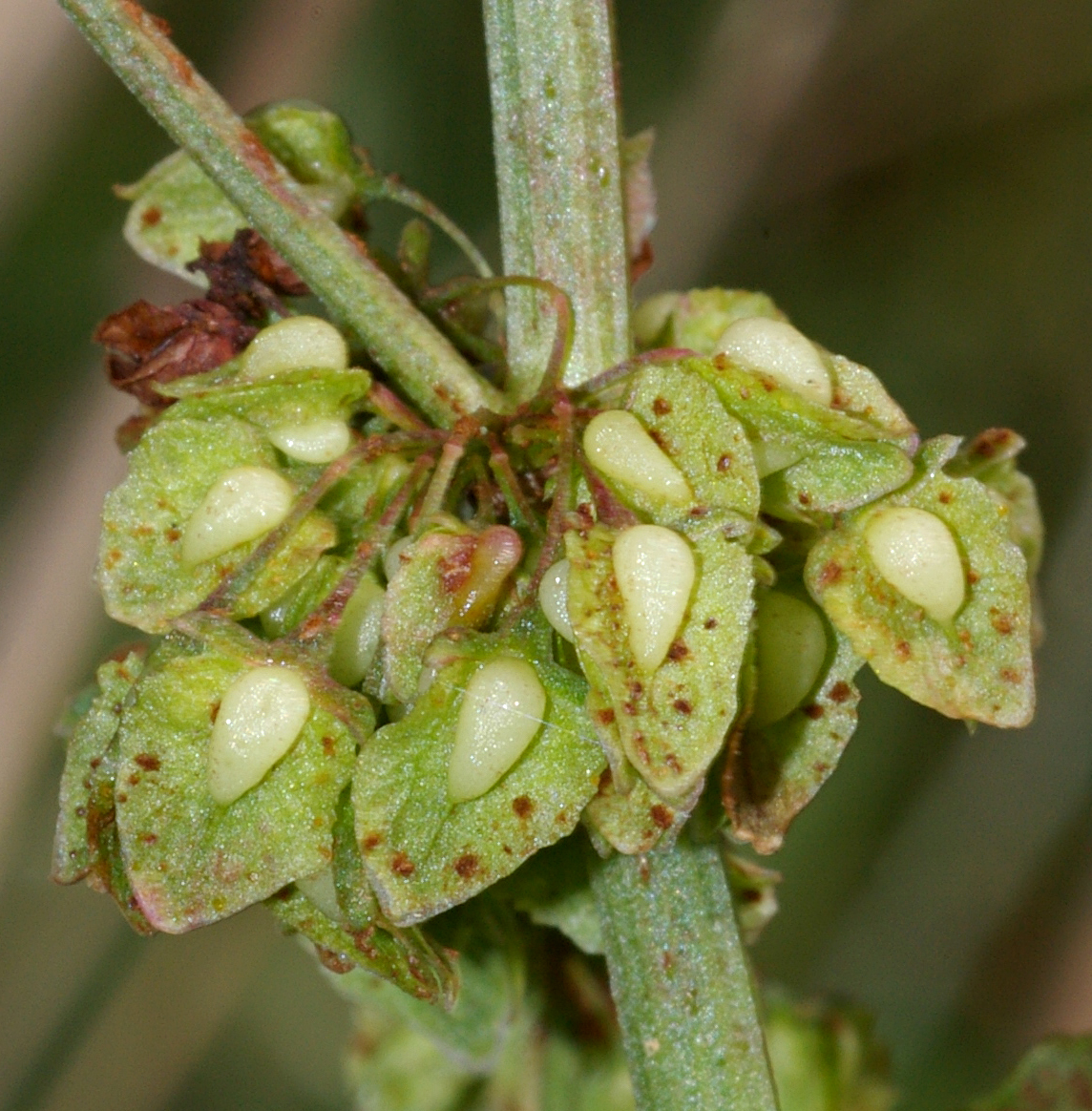
Flowers of curled dock (R. crispus) with remarkable tubercles

As of June 2022, Plants of the World Online accepted the following species. A large number of hybrids are also recorded.

- Rumex abyssinicus Jacq.
- Rumex acetosa L. – sorrel, common sorrel, garden sorrel, narrow-leaved dock, spinach dock
- Rumex acetosella L. – sheep's sorrel, common sheep sorrel, field sorrel, red sorrel
- Rumex aegyptiacus L.
- Rumex aeroplaniformis Eig
- Rumex albescens Hillebr. – Oahu dock
- Rumex alcockii Rech.f.
- Rumex algeriensis Barratte & Murb.
- Rumex alpinus L. – alpine dock, monk's rhubarb
- Rumex altissimus Alph.Wood – pale dock, smooth dock, peach-leaf dock
- Rumex alveolatus Losinsk.
- Rumex amanus Rech.f.
- Rumex amurensis F.Schmidt ex Maxim
- Rumex andinus Rech.f.
- Rumex angulatus Rech.f.
- Rumex angustifolius Campd.
- Rumex aquaticiformis Rech.f.
- Rumex aquaticus L. – western dock, Scottish dock
- Rumex aquitanicus Rech.f.
- Rumex arcticus Trautv.
- Rumex arcuatoramosus Rech.f.
- Rumex argentinus Rech.f.
- Rumex arifolius All.
- Rumex aristidis Coss.
- Rumex armenus K.Koch
- Rumex atlanticus Coss. ex Batt.
- Rumex aureostigmatica Kom.
- Rumex azoricus Rech.f.
- Rumex balcanicus Rech.f.
- Rumex beringensis Jurtzev & V.V.Petrovsky – Bering Sea dock
- Rumex bidens R.Br.
- Rumex bipinnatus L.f.
- Rumex bithynicus Rech.f.
- Rumex brachypodus Rech.f.
- Rumex brasiliensis Link
- Rumex britannica L.
- Rumex brownii Campd. – Browne's dock
- Rumex bryhnii Snogerup
- Rumex bucephalophorus L. – red dock
- Rumex californicus Rech.f.
- Rumex caucasicus Rech.f.
- Rumex chalepensis Mill.
- Rumex chrysocarpos Moris
- Rumex confertus Willd. – Asiatic dock
- Rumex conglomeratus Murray – clustered dock, sharp dock
- Rumex cordatus Poir.
- Rumex costaricensis Rech.f.
- Rumex crassus Rech.f.
- Rumex crispellus Rech.f.
- Rumex crispissimus Kuntze
- Rumex crispus L. – curled dock, curly dock, yellow dock, sour dock, narrow dock, garden patience, narrow-leaved dock
- Rumex cristatus DC.
- Rumex crystallinus Lange – shiny dock
- Rumex cuneifolius Campd.
- Rumex cyprius Murb.
- Rumex darwinianus Rech.f.
- Rumex densiflorus Osterh. – dense-flower dock, dense-flowered dock
- Rumex dentatus L. – toothed dock
- Rumex dregeanus Meisn.
- Rumex drummondii Meisn.
- Rumex dumosus A.Cunn. ex Meisn. – wiry dock
- Rumex elbrusensis Boiss.
- Rumex ellipticus Greene
- Rumex ephedroides Bornm.
- Rumex evenkiensis Elis.
- Rumex fascicularis Small
- Rumex fischeri Rchb.
- Rumex flexicaulis Rech.f.
- Rumex flexuosus Sol. ex G.Forst.
- Rumex floridanus Meisn.
- Rumex frutescens Thouars – wedgeleaf dock
- Rumex fueginus Phil.
- Rumex gangotrianus Aswal & S.K.Srivast.
- Rumex garipensis Meisn.
- Rumex giganteus W.T.Aiton – pawale
- Rumex ginii Jahandiez & Maire
- Rumex gmelinii Turcz. ex Ledeb.
- Rumex gracilescens Rech.f.
- Rumex graminifolius Georgi ex Lamb. – grassleaf sorrel
- Rumex hastatulus Baldwin – heartwing dock, heartwing sorrel
- Rumex hastatus D.Don
- Rumex hesperius Greene
- Rumex hultenii Tzvelev
- Rumex hydrolapathum Huds. – great water dock
- Rumex hymenosepalus Torr. – canaigre, canaigre dock
- Rumex hypogaeus T.M.Schust. & Reveal
- Rumex inconspicuus Rech.f.
- Rumex induratus Boiss. & Reut.
- Rumex intermedius DC.
- Rumex jacutensis Kom.
- Rumex japonicus Houtt.
- Rumex kandavanicus (Rech.f.) Rech.f.
- Rumex kerneri Borbás – Kerner's dock
- Rumex komarovii Schischk. & Serg.
- Rumex krausei Jurtzev & V.V.Petrovsky – Krause's sorrel
- Rumex lacustris Greene
- Rumex lanceolatus Thunb.
- Rumex lapponicus (Hiitonen) Czernov
- Rumex lativalvis Meisn.
- Rumex leptocaulis Brandbyge & Rech.f.
- Rumex limoniastrum Jaub. & Spach
- Rumex longifolius DC. – dooryard dock, northern dock
- Rumex lorentzianus Lindau
- Rumex lunaria L.
- Rumex madaio Makino
- Rumex maderensis Lowe
- Rumex magellanicus Campd.
- Rumex maricola J.Rémy
- Rumex maritimus L. – golden dock, bristle dock, seashore dock
- Rumex marschallianus Rchb.
- Rumex mexicanus Meisn.
- Rumex microcarpus Campd.
- Rumex nebroides Campd.
- Rumex neglectus Kirkg
- Rumex nematopodus Rech.f. – Arizona dock
- Rumex nepalensis Spreng.
- Rumex nervosus Vahl
- Rumex nivalis Hegetschw.
- Rumex oblongifolius Tolm.
- Rumex obovatus Danser – tropical dock
- Rumex obtusifolius L. – broad-leaved dock, bitter dock, bluntleaf dock, butter dock
- Rumex occidentalis S.Watson
- Rumex occultans Sam.
- Rumex olympicus Boiss.
- Rumex orbiculatus A.Gray – great water dock
- Rumex orthoneurus Rech.f. – Chiricahua mountain dock
- Rumex pallidus Bigelow – seaside dock
- Rumex palustris Sm. – marsh dock
- Rumex papilio Coss. & Balansa
- Rumex papillaris Boiss. & Reut.
- Rumex paraguayensis D.Parodi – Paraguayan dock
- Rumex patagonicus Rech.f.
- Rumex patientia L. – patience dock, garden patience, monk's rhubarb
- Rumex paucifolius Nutt. – alpine sheep's sorrel, few-leaved dock, meadow dock
- Rumex paulsenianus Rech.f.
- Rumex persicarioides L.
- Rumex peruanus Rech.f.
- Rumex pictus Forssk.
- Rumex polycarpus Rech.f.
- Rumex ponticus E.H.L.Krause
- Rumex popovii Pachom.
- Rumex praecox Rydb.
- Rumex pseudonatronatus (Borbás) Murb. – field dock
- Rumex pseudoxyria (Tolm.) Khokhr.
- Rumex pulcher L. – fiddle dock
- Rumex punjabensis K.M.Vaid & H.B.Naithani
- Rumex pycnanthus Rech.f.
- Rumex rectinervius Rech.f.
- Rumex rhodesius Rech.f.
- Rumex romassa Remy
- Rumex roseus L.
- Rumex rossicus Murb.
- Rumex rugosus Campd.
- Rumex rupestris Le Gall – shore dock
- Rumex ruwenzoriensis Chiov.
- Rumex sagittatus Thunb.
- Rumex salicifolius Weinm. – willow dock, willow-leaved dock
- Rumex sanguineus L. – wood dock, redvein dock
- Rumex scutatus L. – French sorrel, leaf-shield sorrel
- Rumex sellowianus Rech.f.
- Rumex sibiricus Hultén – Siberian dock
- Rumex similans Rech.f.
- Rumex simpliciflorus Murb.
- Rumex skottsbergii O.Deg. & I.Deg. – lava dock
- Rumex songaricus Fisch. & C.A.Mey.
- Rumex spathulatus Thunb.
- Rumex spinosus L.
- Rumex spiralis Small – winged dock
- Rumex stenoglottis Rech.f.
- Rumex stenophyllus Ledeb.
- Rumex subarcticus Lepage
- Rumex suffruticosus J.Gay ex Meisn.
- Rumex tenax Rech.f.
- Rumex thjanschanicus Losinsk.
- Rumex thyrsiflorus Fingerh.
- Rumex thyrsoides Desf.
- Rumex tmoleus Boiss.
- Rumex tolimensis Wedd.
- Rumex transitorius Rech.f.
- Rumex triangulivalvis (Danser) Rech.f.
- Rumex trisetifer Stokes
- Rumex tuberosus L.
- Rumex tunetanus Barratte & Murb.
- Rumex turcomanicus (Rech.f.) Czerep.
- Rumex ucranicus Fisch. ex Spreng.
- Rumex ujskensis Rech.f.
- Rumex uruguayensis Rech.f.
- Rumex usambarensis (Engl.) Dammer
- Rumex utahensis Rech.f.
- Rumex venosus Pursh – veiny dock, sand dock
- Rumex verticillatus L. – swamp dock, water dock
- Rumex vesicarius L. – bladder dock
- Rumex violascens Rech.f. – violet dock
- Rumex woodii N.E.Br.
- Rumex yungningensis Sam.

== Uses ==
Dock, raw (Rumex spp.)
Nutritional value per 100 g (3.5 oz)
- Energy: 92 kJ (22 kcal)
- Carbohydrates: 3.2 g
- Dietary fiber: 2.9 g
- Fat: 0.7 g
- Protein: 2 g
Vitamins and minerals
Vitamins	Quantity %DV^{†}
Vitamin A equiv.	22% 200 μg
Thiamine (B1)	3% 0.04 mg
Riboflavin (B2)	8% 0.1 mg
Niacin (B3)	3% 0.5 mg
Vitamin B6	7% 0.122 mg
Folate (B9)	3% 13 μg
Vitamin C	53% 48 mg
Minerals	Quantity %DV^{†}
Calcium	3% 44 mg
Iron	13% 2.4 mg
Magnesium	25% 103 mg
Manganese	15% 0.349 mg
Phosphorus	5% 63 mg
Potassium	13% 390 mg
Zinc	2% 0.2 mg
- Other constituents: Quantity
- Water: 93 g
- Link to USDA Database entry
- ^{†}Percentages estimated using US recommendations for adults, except for potassium, which is estimated based on expert recommendation from the National Academies.

Broad-leaved dock (Rumex obtusifolius) used to be called butter dock because its large leaves were used to wrap and conserve butter.

These plants are edible. The leaves of most species contain oxalic acid and tannin, and many have astringent and slightly purgative qualities. Some species with particularly high levels of oxalic acid are called sorrels (including sheep's sorrel Rumex acetosella, common sorrel Rumex acetosa, and French sorrel Rumex scutatus), and some of these are grown as leaf vegetables or garden herbs for their acidic taste.

In the United Kingdom, Rumex obtusifolius is often found growing near stinging nettles, owing to both species favouring a similar environment, and there is a widely held belief that the underside of the dock leaf, squeezed to extract a little juice, can be rubbed on the skin to counteract the itching caused by brushing against a nettle plant. This home remedy is not supported by any science, although it is possible that the act of rubbing may act as a distracting counterstimulation, or that belief in the dock's effect may provide a placebo effect.

=== Nutrition ===
Raw dock is 93% water, 3% carbohydrates, 2% protein, and 1% fat (table). In a reference amount of 100 g (3.5 oz), it supplies 22 calories and rich amounts (more than 20% of the Daily Value, DV) of vitamin C, vitamin A, and magnesium, with moderate content of several dietary minerals (table).

== Fossil record ==
Several fossil fruits of Rumex sp. have been described from middle Miocene strata of the Fasterholt area near Silkeborg in Central Jutland, Denmark. One fossil fruit of a Rumex species has been extracted from a borehole sample of the Middle Miocene fresh water deposits in Nowy Sacz Basin, West Carpathians, Poland. This fossil fruit is similar to the fruits of the extant species Rumex maritimus and Rumex ucranicus which both have fossil records from the Pliocene and Pleistocene of Europe.
