= Rumex beringensis =

Scientific classification
- Kingdom: Plantae
- Clade: Tracheophytes
- Clade: Angiosperms
- Clade: Eudicots
- Order: Caryophyllales
- Family: Polygonaceae
- Genus: Rumex
- Species: R. beringensis

Binomial name
- Rumex beringensis Jurtzev & V.V.Petrovsky

Species of flowering plant

Rumex beringensis is a flowering plant species in the family Polygonaceae.
