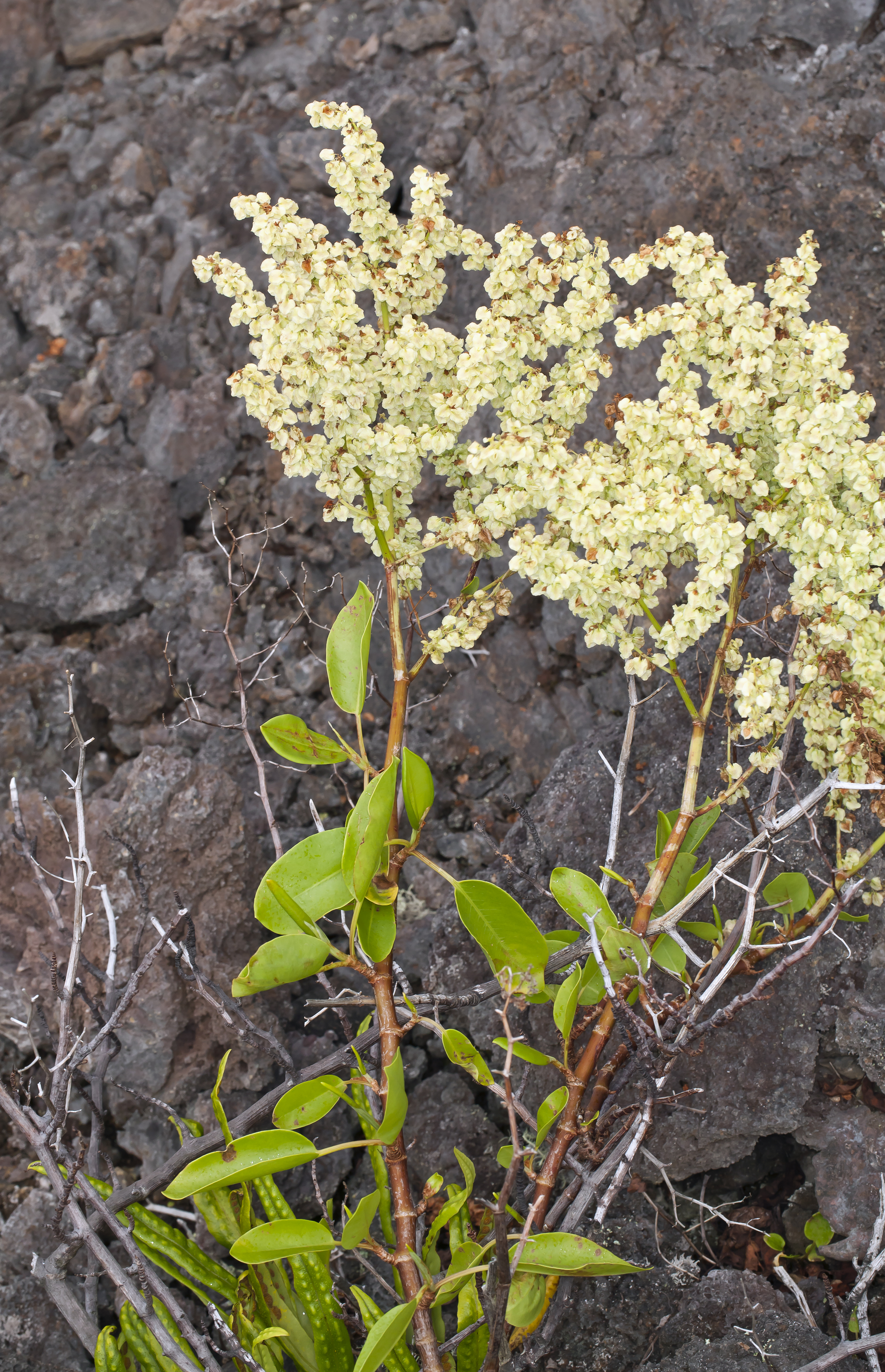

Scientific classification
- Kingdom: Plantae
- Clade: Tracheophytes
- Clade: Angiosperms
- Clade: Eudicots
- Order: Caryophyllales
- Family: Polygonaceae
- Genus: Rumex
- Species: R. skottsbergii

Binomial name
- Rumex skottsbergii O. Deg. & I. Deg.

= Rumex skottsbergii =

Species of shrub

Rumex skottsbergii, or more commonly known as lava dock, is a shrub of the genus Rumex. The genus comprises approximately 200 species all derived from a single species and are therefore monophyletic. Furthermore, Rumex skottsbergii is endemic to Hawaii, where it is known as pāwale. Pāwale are commonly found in open lava fields that are at low elevations which range from 460-1300m. A similar plant in this genus is Rumex giganteus. Their similarity lies between their erect nature and leaves. However, the difference lies in their inflorescences. The inflorescences is described as being a cluster of flowers from the main stem axis .

== Description ==
Rumex skottsbergii can be identified through their green, narrow, compact inflorescences, erect nature and small leaves. Their stems are usually stiffly erect with 7-10dm long and glabrous. Rumex skottsbergii can also be identified through their unisexual flowers and medium-sized yellowish greenish branched inflorescences; their outer tepals are also a distinguishable trait found within this genus.

== Distribution ==
Rumex skottsbergii are found in Hawaii and are species that flourish in low elevation and open lava fields.

== Uses ==
Rumex skottsbergii was used for medicinal purposes and was used to treat a childhood's diseases known as pāʻaoʻao and constipation. The childhood disease would cause physical weakening.
