= Rumex cuneifolius =

Scientific classification
- Kingdom: Plantae
- Clade: Tracheophytes
- Clade: Angiosperms
- Clade: Eudicots
- Order: Caryophyllales
- Family: Polygonaceae
- Genus: Rumex
- Species: R. cuneifolius

Binomial name
- Rumex cuneifolius Campd.

Species of flowering plant

Rumex cuneifolius is a flowering plant species in the family Polygonaceae.

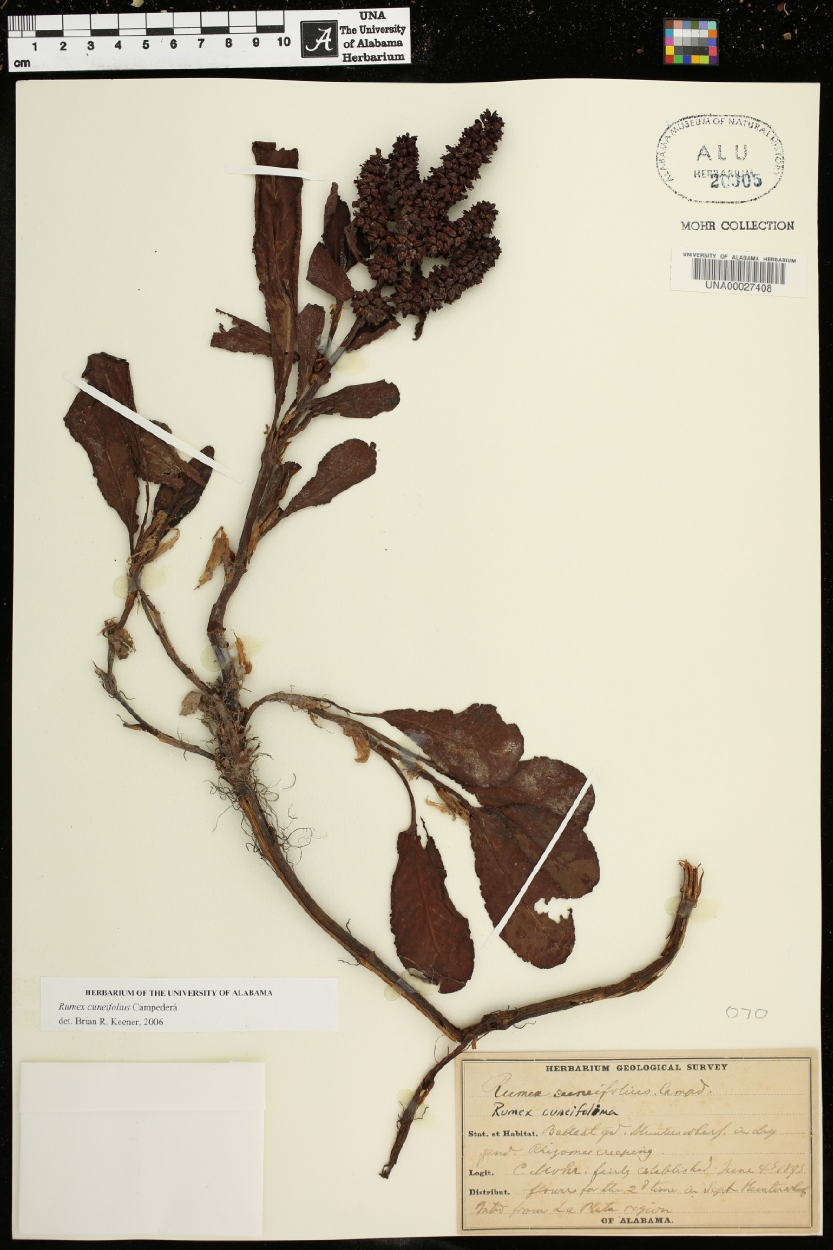
This is a picture from the University of Alabama's herbarium. Depicted is their Rumex cuneifolius specimen. The details on the plants collection, such as when it was collected and where it was collected, can be found on the herbarium label in the lower right corner.

== Description ==
Rumex cuneifolius (also known as Argentine dock or wedgeleaf dock) is a perennial stoloniferous herbaceous flowering dicot in the family Polygonacae. It has obovate or obovate-elepitic leaf morphology with margins entire or crisped. It has terminal and axillary paniculate inflorescences and articulated/swollen pedicels. It yields between 5 and 20 flowers whorl while maintaining ovate-deltoid/ovate-triangular morphology with a truncate/cuneate base for its inner tepals with margins entire. It has 3 tubercles and small glossy/reddish brown achenes that are up to 3mm x 2.5mm big.

== Taxonomy ==
Rumex cuneifolius was discovered by François Campderá in 1819 in South America (Bolivia, Paraguay, and Peru). There are no major synonyms for this plant and there have been no major changes in its classification.

== Distribution and habitat ==
Rumex cuneifolius grows on sandy shores, in coastal areas, and in wasteplaces. In North America, Rumex cuneifolius is an alien only found in a few localities, but it is well established in Portland, Oregon. It is native to South America, but it has also been introduced to Europe and Australia.

== Uses ==
There are no known uses for Rumex cuneifolius, nor any records of human cultivation of this plant. However, some of its relatives, such as Rumex crispus and Rumex aquaticus, have medicinal uses.
