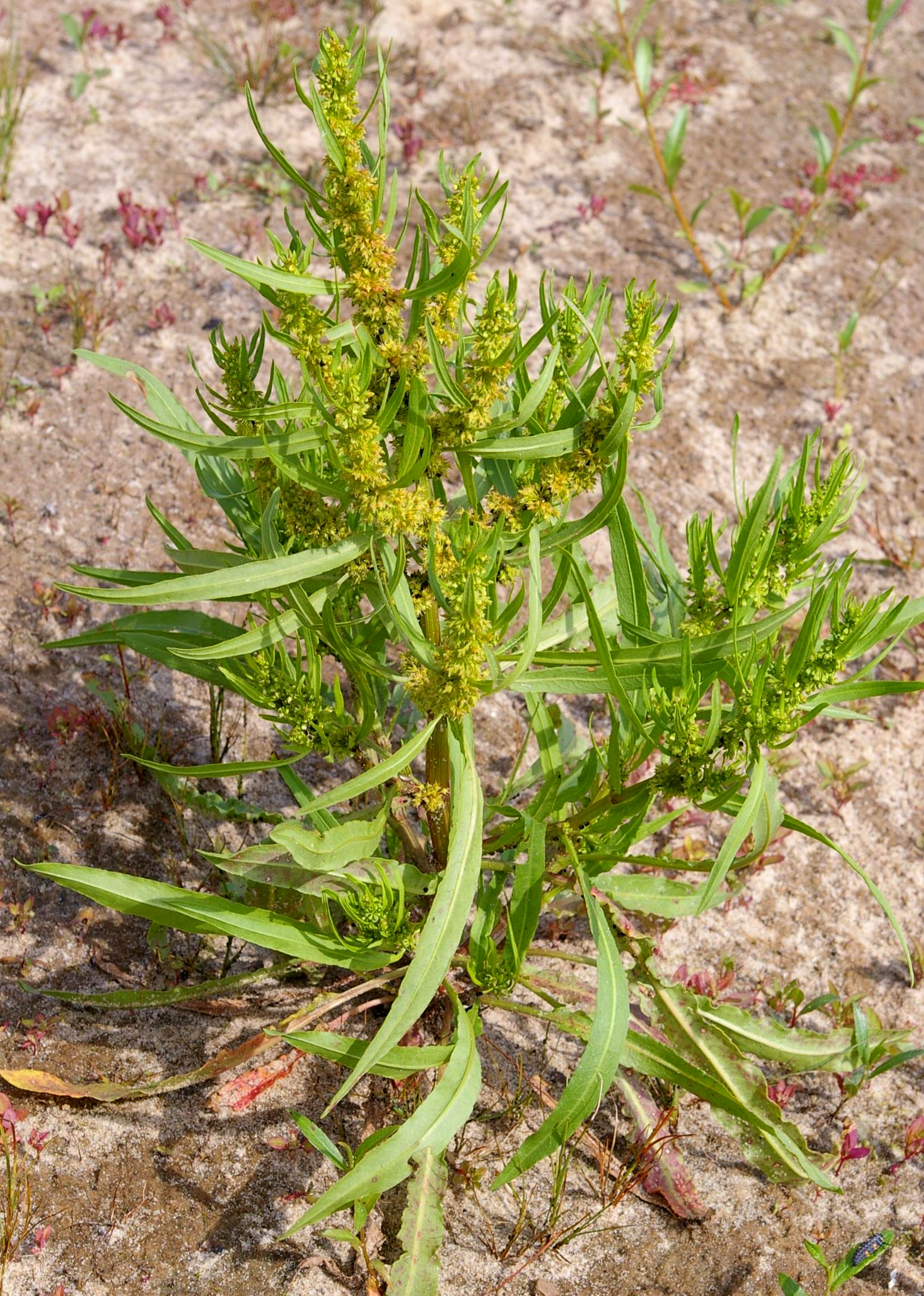

Scientific classification
- Kingdom: Plantae
- Clade: Tracheophytes
- Clade: Angiosperms
- Clade: Eudicots
- Order: Caryophyllales
- Family: Polygonaceae
- Genus: Rumex
- Species: R. fueginus

Binomial name
- Rumex fueginus Phil.

Synonyms
- Rumex maritimus subsp. fueginus (Phil.) Piper & Beattie; Rumex maritimus var. fueginus (Phil.) Dusén

= Rumex fueginus =

Species of flowering plant

Rumex fueginus, known as American dock, golden dock, and Tierra del Fuego dock, is a flowering plant in the family Polygonaceae. Rumex fueginus was first formally named by Rodolfo Armando Phillipi. Rumex fueginus is native from Canada in northern North America to Tierra del Fuego at the southern tip of South America. It has previously been considered a subspecies or variety of Rumex maritimus, a Eurasian species.

== Description ==
Rumex fueginus is an annual or biennial plant growing up to 60 cm (24 in) tall. It has long, cylindrical, spike-like clusters of flowers at the tips of their branching stems. The flowers are arranged in whorls of 15-30 slender-like stalks. Each flower is less than 1/8 inches long and three-sided with two series of tepals. The flowers are minutely hairy and can range in color from green to yellow. At the base of each inner tepal is a projection called a grain. The tepals are slightly spread out at flowering but close after pollination. Each seed is egg-shaped with a pointed tip, light brown, and less than 1.5 mm long.

The leaves are alternate, ranging between 2 and 10 inches long and 1/2 and 1 inch wide. The edge of the leaf (margin) can be slightly wavy or crinkly. The seeds are 3-sided, egg-shaped with a pointed tip. R. fueginus has elongated shoots that grow during mid summer. During flood seasons, the plant's shoots are much smaller to help support water transportation.

== Distribution and habitat ==
Rumex fueginus is an annual or perennial herb that is native to most of North and South America, excluding the southeastern United States. It grows in sunny, moist environments such as wet meadows, bogs, streambeds, and ponds, as well as disturbed areas. Its habitats include saline areas such as barrier beaches, edges of saltwater ponds.

Within the last 100 years, botanists have seen a significant decrease of the species' population in New York due to exotic invasive species and direct disturbances to its salt marsh habitats. Since the late 1800s, there have been 13 recorded populations of the species in New York.

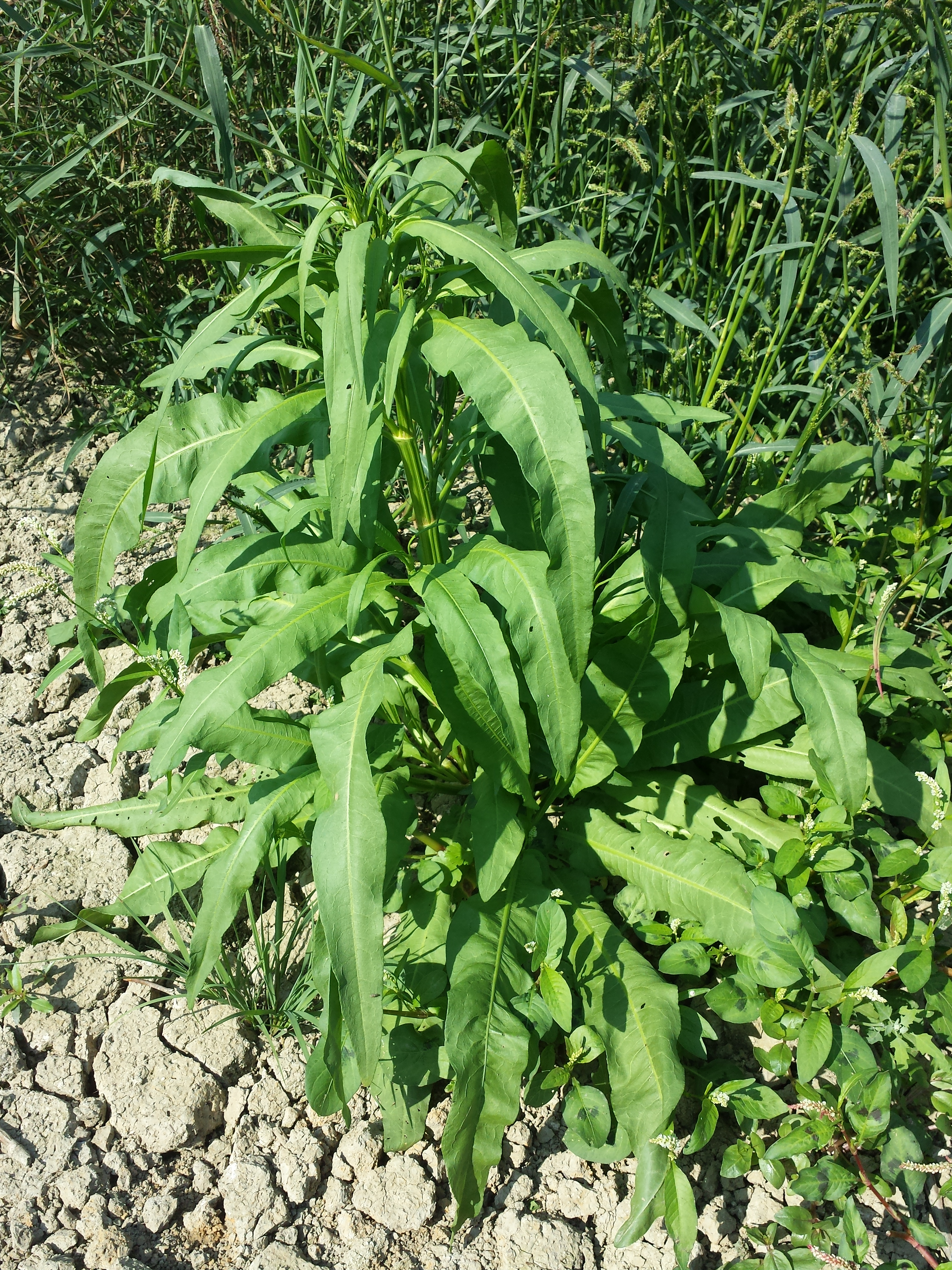
Leaves

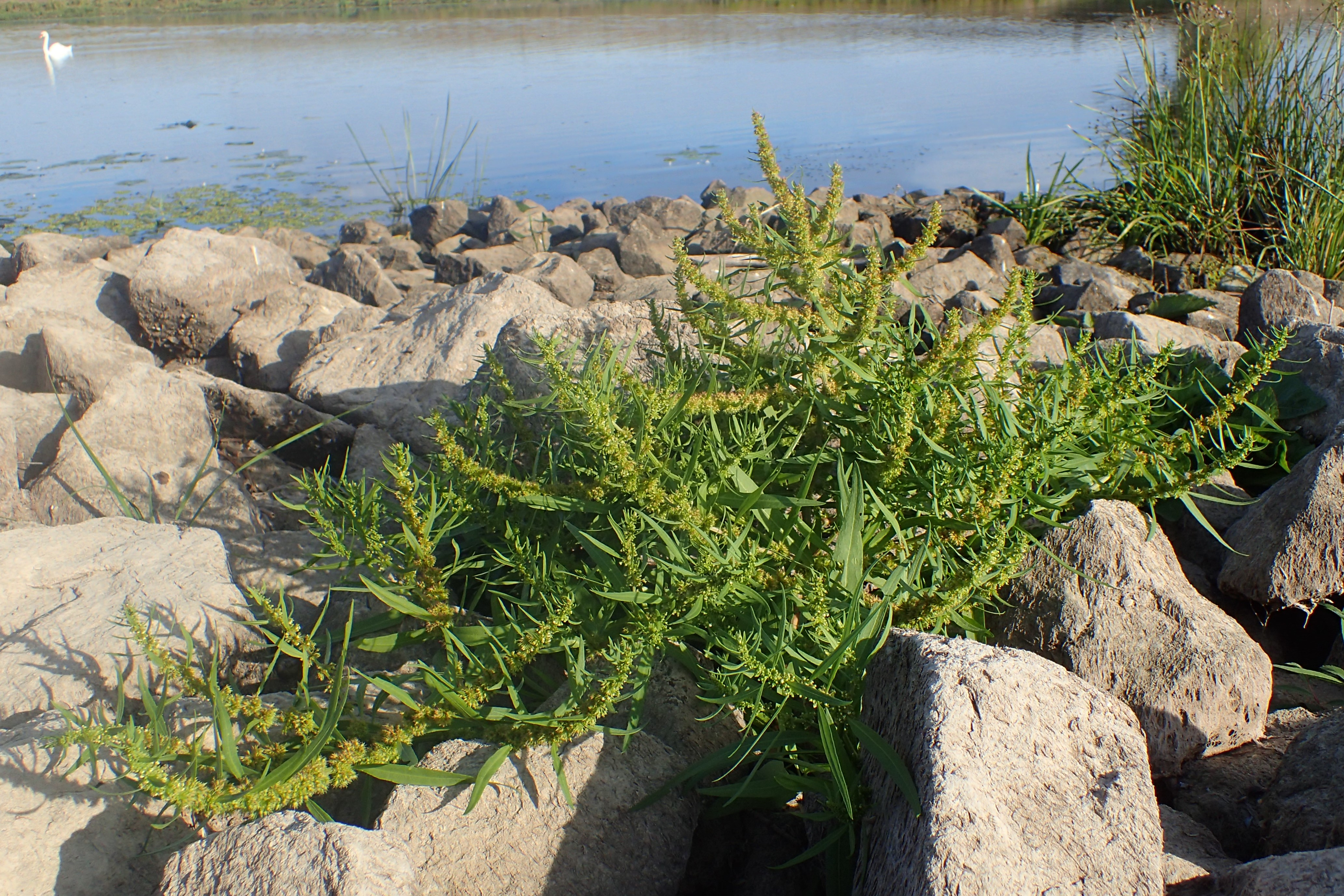
Growing amongst riprap

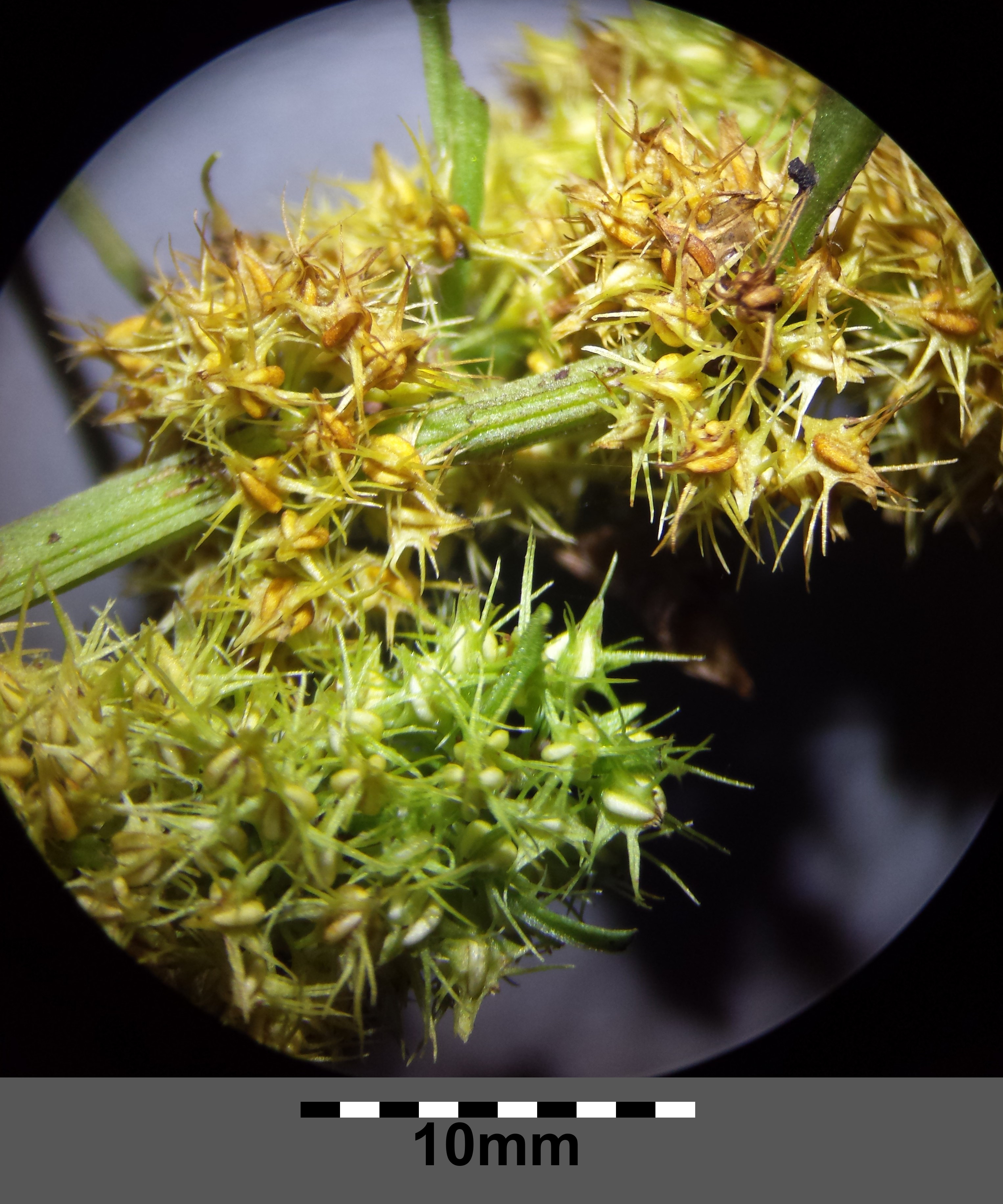
Close-up of the fruits
