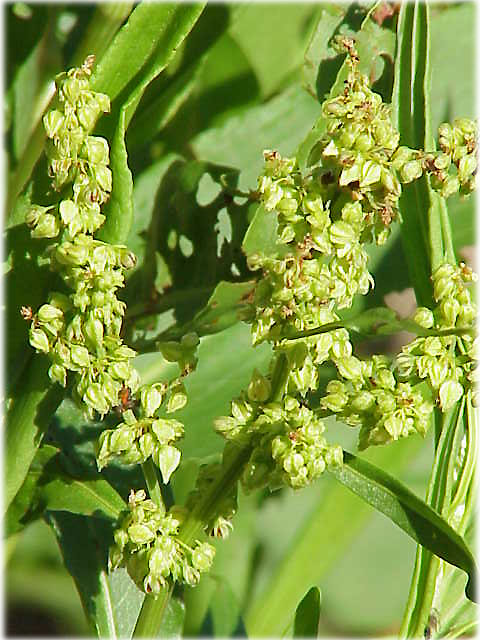

Scientific classification
- Kingdom: Plantae
- Clade: Tracheophytes
- Clade: Angiosperms
- Clade: Eudicots
- Order: Caryophyllales
- Family: Polygonaceae
- Genus: Rumex
- Species: R. triangulivalvis

Binomial name
- Rumex triangulivalvis (Danser) Rech.f.

= Rumex triangulivalvis =

Species of flowering plant

Rumex triangulivalvis is a species of flowering plant belonging to the family Polygonaceae.

Its native range is Northern Europe, Northern America.
