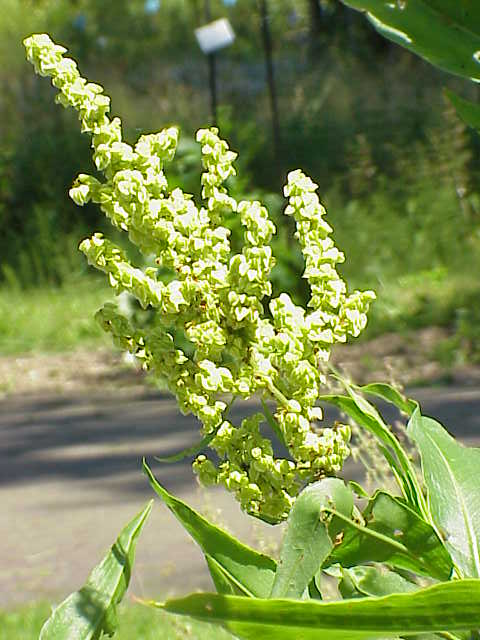

Scientific classification
- Kingdom: Plantae
- Clade: Tracheophytes
- Clade: Angiosperms
- Clade: Eudicots
- Order: Caryophyllales
- Family: Polygonaceae
- Genus: Rumex
- Species: R. britannica

Binomial name
- Rumex britannica L.

= Rumex britannica =

Species of flowering plant

Rumex britannica is a flowering plant species in the family Polygonaceae.(Buckwheat family) (perennial).

== Flower ==
The flower consists of branching clusters that emerge from the uppermost part of the plant. The branches are decorated with whorls of 15-25 slim-stalked flowers, These are usually accumulated by the branch tips and become increasingly separated the further away they are located from the branch tip. These flowers are approximately ¼ inch long, with green and pink coloration, 3 sided along with 2 sets of tepal (the inner being tepals being much larger than the outer). The three inner valves (tepals) are egg-shaped to pseudo-spherical in shape with differentiating veins across their surface. The edges vary from smooth to wavy and even jagged. The base of each inner tepal consists of a projection termed a grain which in length, measures at about ½ of the tepal, a lance-oblong which generally is tapering to a sharp tip, with the 3 tepals having identically sized grains. At the time of flowering tepals are spreading, demonstrating their stamens and styles and proceed to retract during pollination. At twice the length of inner tepals at flowering time, flower stalks are petite and smooth while possessing an obscure joint in the lower third.

== Leaves and stems ==
The leaves are found to be in both the basal and alternate. With a hairless, smooth to barely scalloped on its edges. They are also seen to have lateral veins that are almost perpendicular to the midvein. Basal leaves are lance-oblong in nature with a length of 1–2 feet and about 3 inches wide. They are also flat or sometimes wavy, and their tips end bluntly or sharply, wedge shaped to linear across the foundation which is found at the stalk which is equal in length to the blade. New leaves form erect, and rolled with the edge which proceed to unravel and are red to bronzy orange in appearance.

While ascending the stem the leaves become smaller, tapering at both ends and sharper at the tip, while also being shortly stalked and more crinkled around the edge.

A paperlike sheath called the ocrea which is brownish in appearance is located at the foundation of the leaf stalk while surrounding the stem and disintegrates with maturity.

The stems of the plant are plump, erect, and for the most part, unbranched except in flower clusters, ridged and hairless.

== Fruit ==
Single seeds emerge from the flower of the plant which are wrapped in tepals, which form a pod-like structure which proceed to dry and decolorize to brown.

The seeds are 3 sided, oval- to egg shaped with short tapering at the end. They are also reddish brown, and measure to be about 3 to 4.5 mm long.

== Ecology ==
During late spring through the summer this plant blooms. The height of this plant is approximately three to six feet.

Rumex britannica is native to the Northeast and northern Midwest of North America. It is native in many parts of the Northeast. California primarily has the plant as a native species.

The habitat in which Rumex britannica thrives is wetland areas, including alongside rivers, lakes, or even swamps.

This plant was used by Native Americans for medicinal purposes. One of these medicinal purposes is treating skin related diseases.

The seeds of Rumex britannica are eaten by birds including the swamp sparrow, song sparrow, bobolink, and red-winged blackbird, as well as small mammals including the meadow vole and muskrat. Many insects rely on the foliage, seeds, and roots of the plant.

Conservation efforts: In the United States, Rumex britannica is secure and is currently not facing any signs of population decline. Rumex Britannica does not fall under the US Endangered Species Act. It also does not fall under the Committee on the Status of Endangered Wildlife in Canada (COCOSEWIC)
