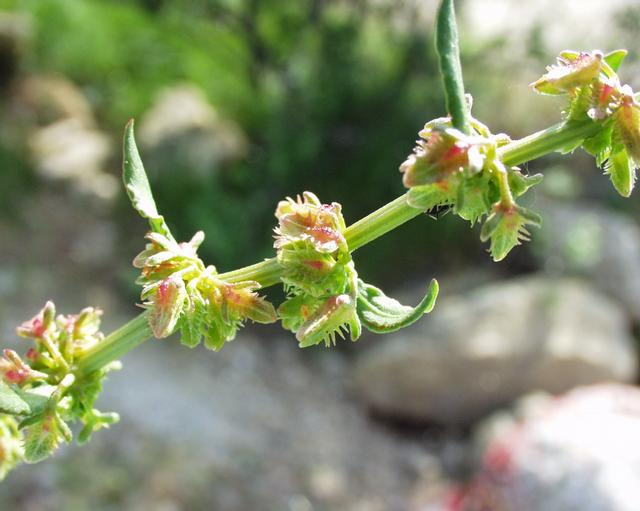

Scientific classification
- Kingdom: Plantae
- Clade: Tracheophytes
- Clade: Angiosperms
- Clade: Eudicots
- Order: Caryophyllales
- Family: Polygonaceae
- Genus: Rumex
- Species: R. pulcher

Binomial name
- Rumex pulcher L.

= Rumex pulcher =

Species of flowering plant

Rumex pulcher is a species of flowering plant in the knotweed family known by the common name fiddle dock.

It is quite variable in appearance, and some authorities divide it into several subspecies that are more or less distinguishable. In general, it is a perennial herb producing a slender, erect stem from a thick taproot, approaching 70 centimetres (28 in) in maximum height. The top of the plant may bend, especially as the fruit develops. The leaves are up to 10–15 cm (4–6 in) long and variable in shape, though often oblong with a narrow middle in the rough shape of a fiddle.

The inflorescence is made up of many branches, each an interrupted series of clusters of up to 20 flowers each, individual flowers hanging from a pedicel. The flower has usually six tepals, the inner three of which are edged with teeth and have tubercles at their centers.

The plant is native to Eurasia and North Africa and it can be found elsewhere, including parts of North America, as an introduced species and a roadside weed.
