= Rumex andinus =

Conservation status
- Vulnerable (IUCN 3.1)

Scientific classification
- Kingdom: Plantae
- Clade: Tracheophytes
- Clade: Angiosperms
- Clade: Eudicots
- Order: Caryophyllales
- Family: Polygonaceae
- Genus: Rumex
- Species: R. andinus

Binomial name
- Rumex andinus Rech.f.

Species of flowering plant

Rumex andinus is a species of plant in the family Polygonaceae. It is endemic to Ecuador.
