= Rumex persicarioides =

Scientific classification
- Kingdom: Plantae
- Clade: Tracheophytes
- Clade: Angiosperms
- Clade: Eudicots
- Order: Caryophyllales
- Family: Polygonaceae
- Genus: Rumex
- Species: R. persicarioides

Binomial name
- Rumex persicarioides L.

Synonyms
- Lapathum persicarioides (L.) Moench; Rumex maritimus var. persicarioides (L.) R.S.Mitch.

Species of flowering plant

Rumex persicarioides is a flowering dicot species in the family Polygonaceae. This species flowers annually in the summer-time but on rare occasions it has been found to be biennial. R. persicarioides is not cultivated for human use and should not be confused with the similarly named genus Persicariae.

== Taxonomy ==
Rumex persicarioides was first described by Carl Linnaeus in 1753. It has been treated as a variety of Rumex maritimus (as R. maritimus var. persicarioides by R. S. Mitchell), but is accepted as a full species by other sources, including the online Flora of North America.

== Description ==
R. persicarioides stands erect at about 15–75 cm in height. The plant contains papillose and pubescent protrusions in its inflorescence and on the abaxial leaf blade. The stem is mostly inflorescent, with branching mostly starting a third of the way up from the base. Shorter plants start inflorescence at the base of the stem. Flowers of R. persicarioides are straw-colored and densely whorled at the distal most end of the inflorescence. The flowers consist of triangular tepals with tooth-like margins and brown fruiting achenes. The pedicels are threadlike and weakly visible, being 3-7mm in length. The leaves of R. persicarioides are long, thin lanceolate or oblong-lanceolate blades ranging from 5–25 cm in length with vaguely undulated or entire margins. Leaf blades are either truncate or cordate at the base and acute at the tip.

== Distribution ==
R. persicarioides thrives in wet and saline ecosystems, typically being found in coastal regions and salt marshes. It is native to western Canada and the US (British Columbia, Oregon and California) and eastern Canada and the northeastern US (New Brunswick, Nova Scotia, Prince Edward Island, Quebec, Connecticut, Massachusetts and New York State).
