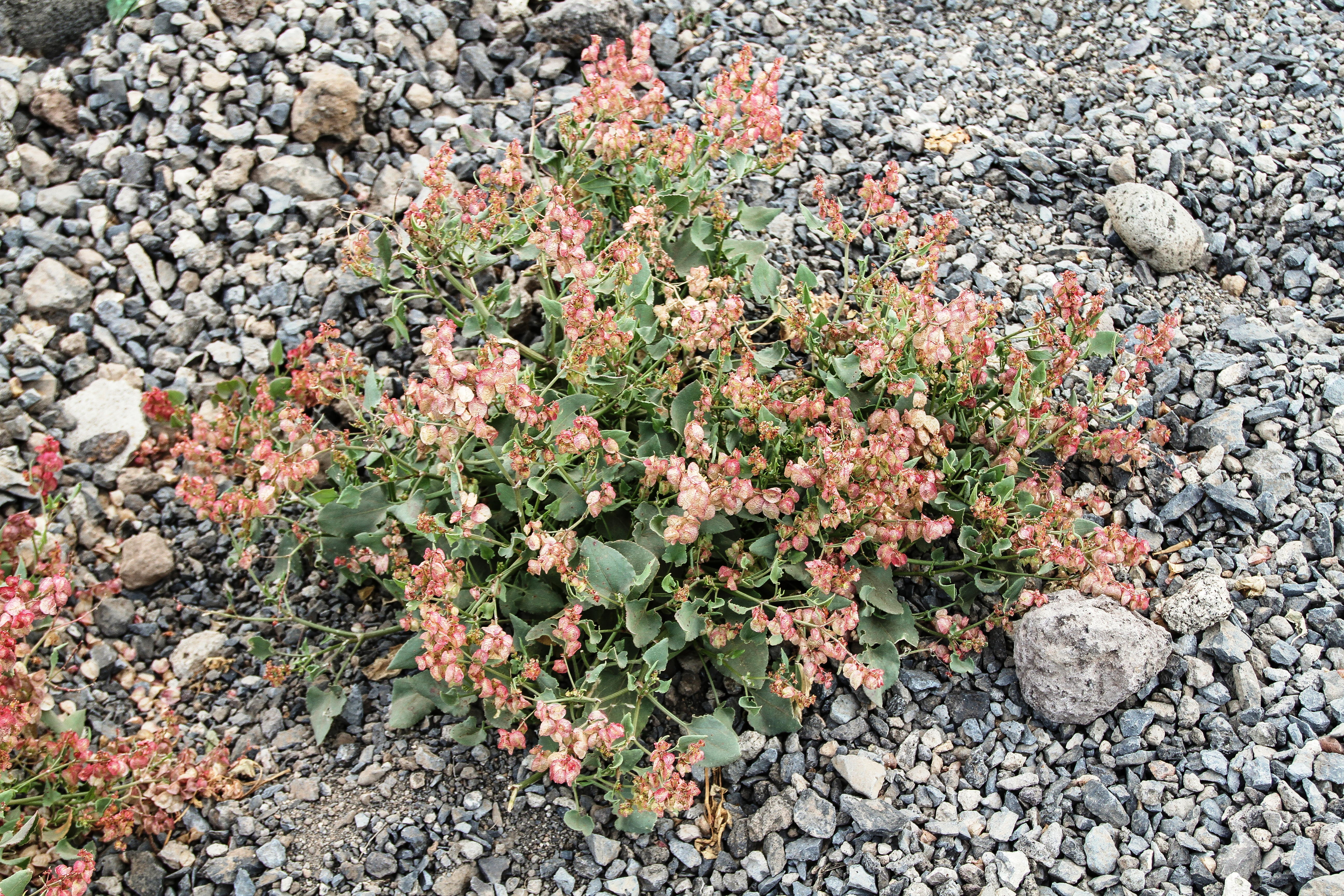

Scientific classification
- Kingdom: Plantae
- Clade: Tracheophytes
- Clade: Angiosperms
- Clade: Eudicots
- Order: Caryophyllales
- Family: Polygonaceae
- Genus: Rumex
- Species: R. lunaria

Binomial name
- Rumex lunaria L.

Synonyms
- Acetosa lunaria (L.) Mill.; Lapathum arborescens Moench; Menophyla lunaria (L.) Raf.; Menophyla polygama (Cav.) Raf.

= Rumex lunaria =

Species of flowering plant

Rumex lunaria is a species of flowering plant in the family Polygonaceae, native to the Canary Islands. It has been introduced to Italy, Sardinia and Sicily. It was first described by Carl Linnaeus.

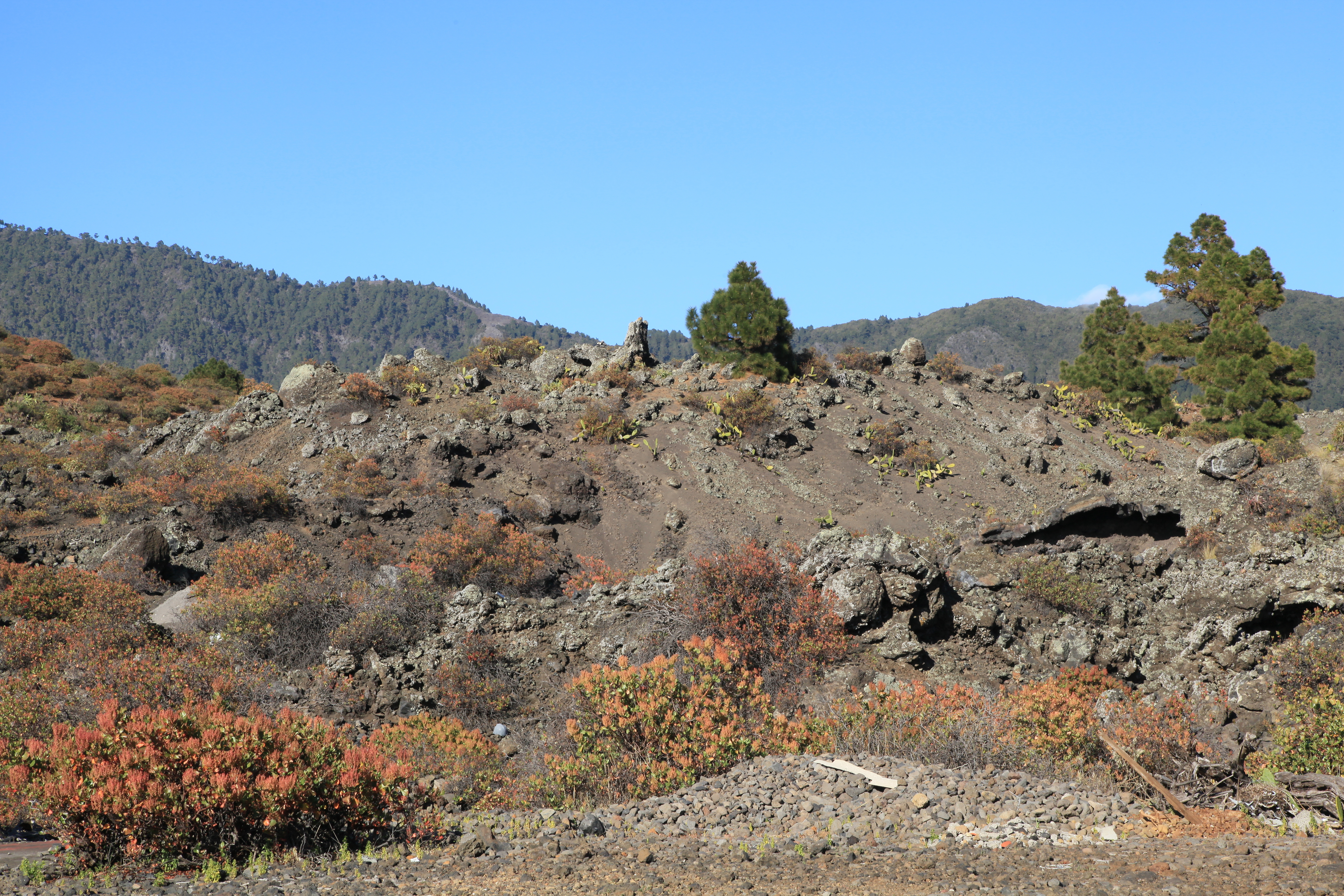
In habitat in La Palma

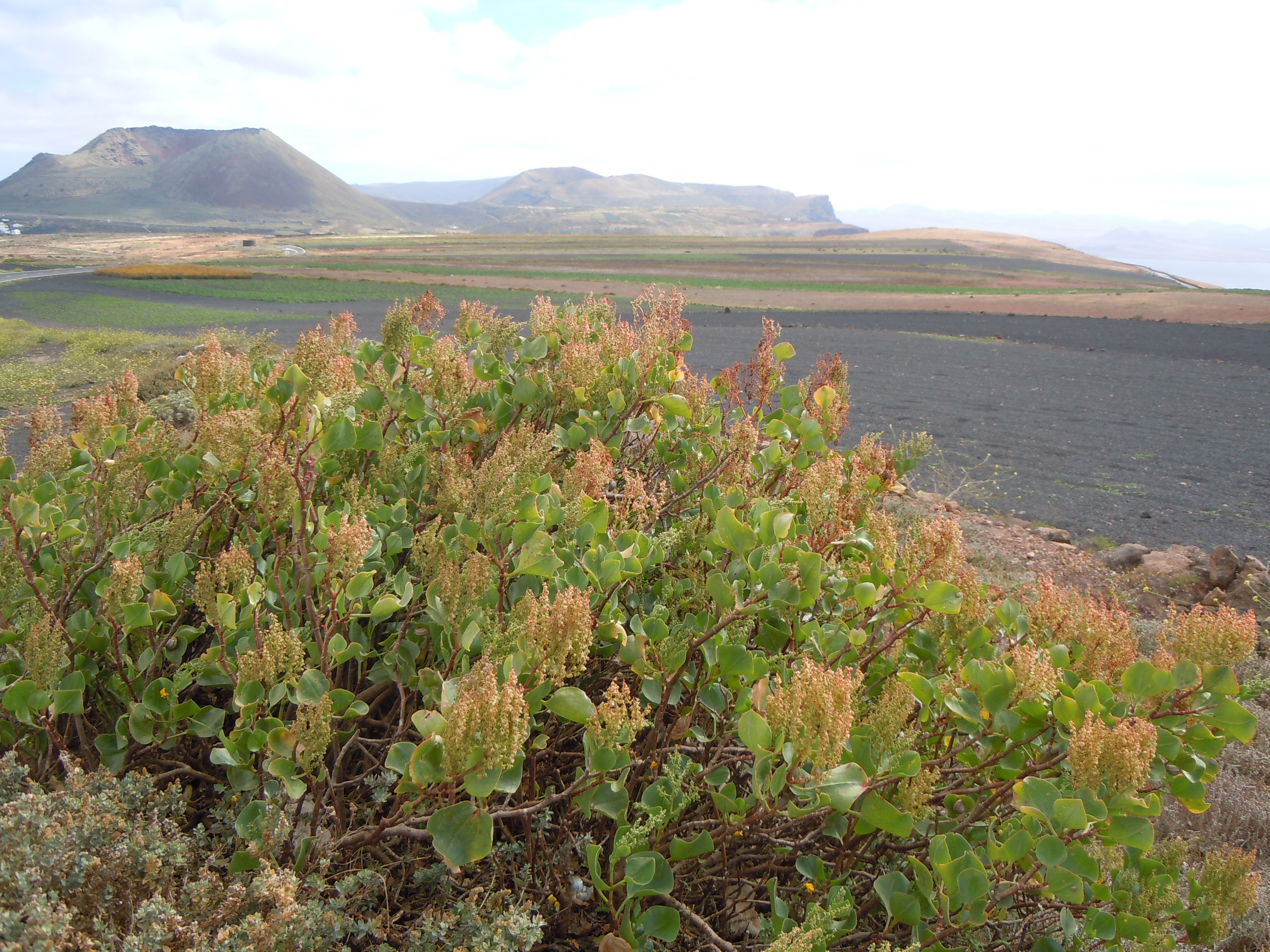
In habitat in Lanzarote

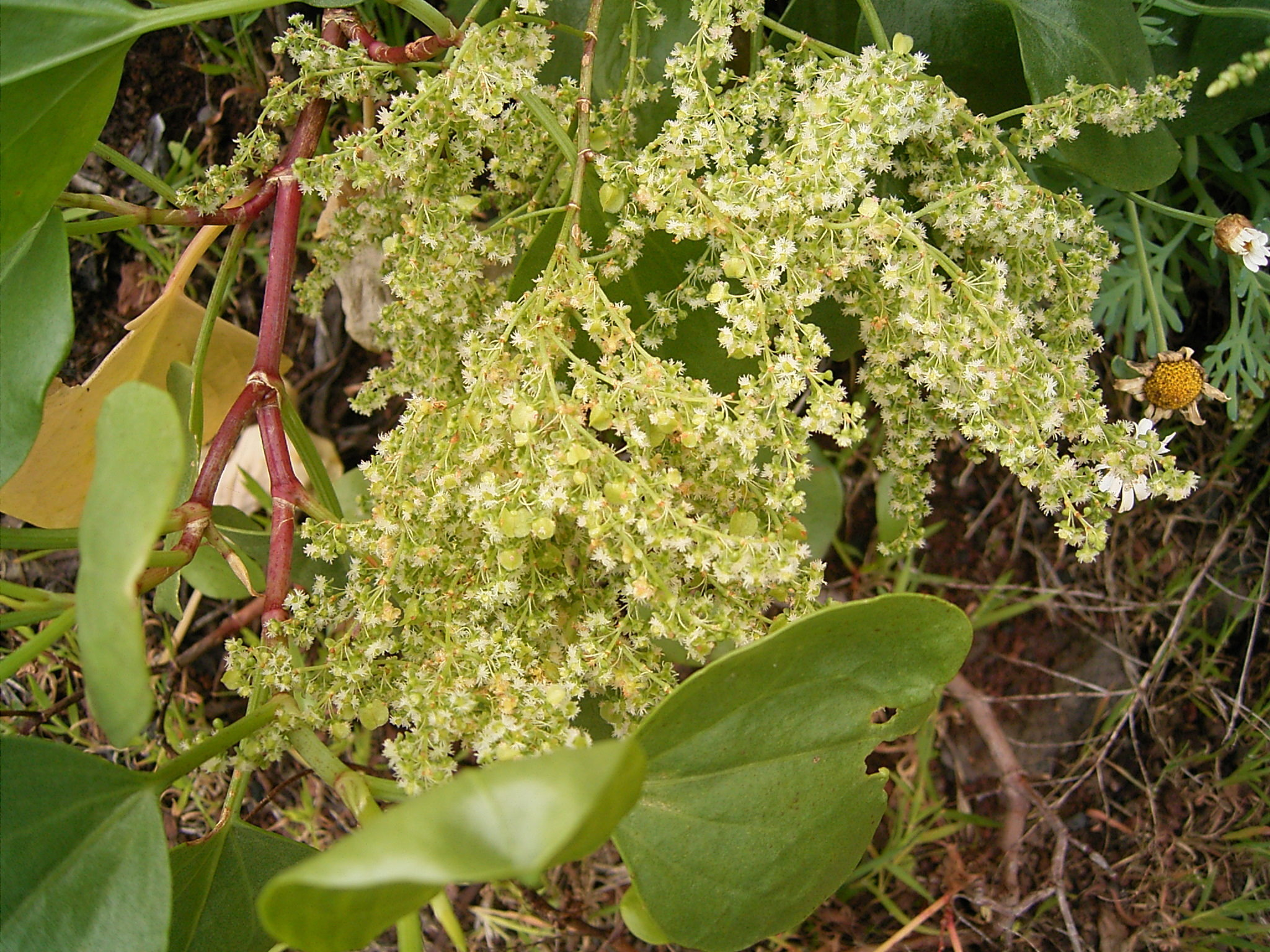
Flowers

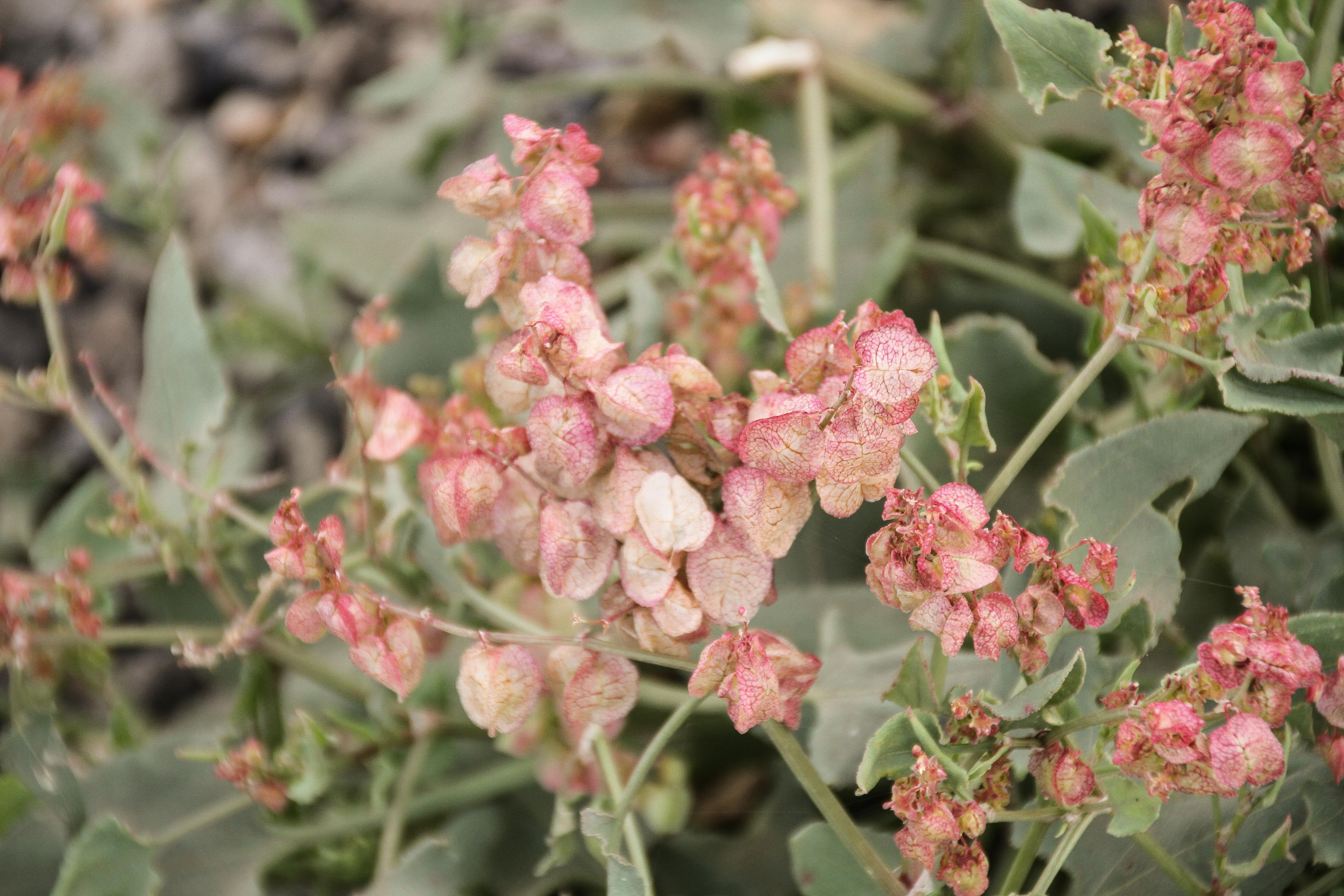
Fruit
