= Rumex spiralis =

Scientific classification
- Kingdom: Plantae
- Clade: Tracheophytes
- Clade: Angiosperms
- Clade: Eudicots
- Order: Caryophyllales
- Family: Polygonaceae
- Genus: Rumex
- Species: R. spiralis

Binomial name
- Rumex spiralis Small

Species of flowering plant

Rumex spiralis is a flowering plant commonly known as winged dock in the family Polygonaceae. This is a perennial herbaceous plant that is predominantly native to southern Texas. This plant grows between 0–200 m in altitude.

== Description ==
The stems are a brownish color and grow 50–90 cm high. Connected to the stem are pedicels of simple thin proximal attachments that slightly thicken to 2–8 mm. The light green leaves are arranged alternately on the stem. The common leaf shape of Rumex spiralis is lanceolate. The leaf margins are entire. The leaf venation is pinnate. The leaves are 10–15 cm long and 3–5 cm wide. The flowers are in clusters of 12–20. The cordate sepals are 7–10 mm by 8–10 mm, and have acuminate tips. The sepals also appear distinctly wrinkled and reddish-brown in color.

== Habitat and distribution ==
Rumex spiralis is endemic to southern Texas. This plant thrives on sandy shorelines.

== Uses ==
It is typical for species of the genus Rumex to be high in oxalates which could be toxic to humans if consumed in high quantities. There are no recorded uses for this particular species.
