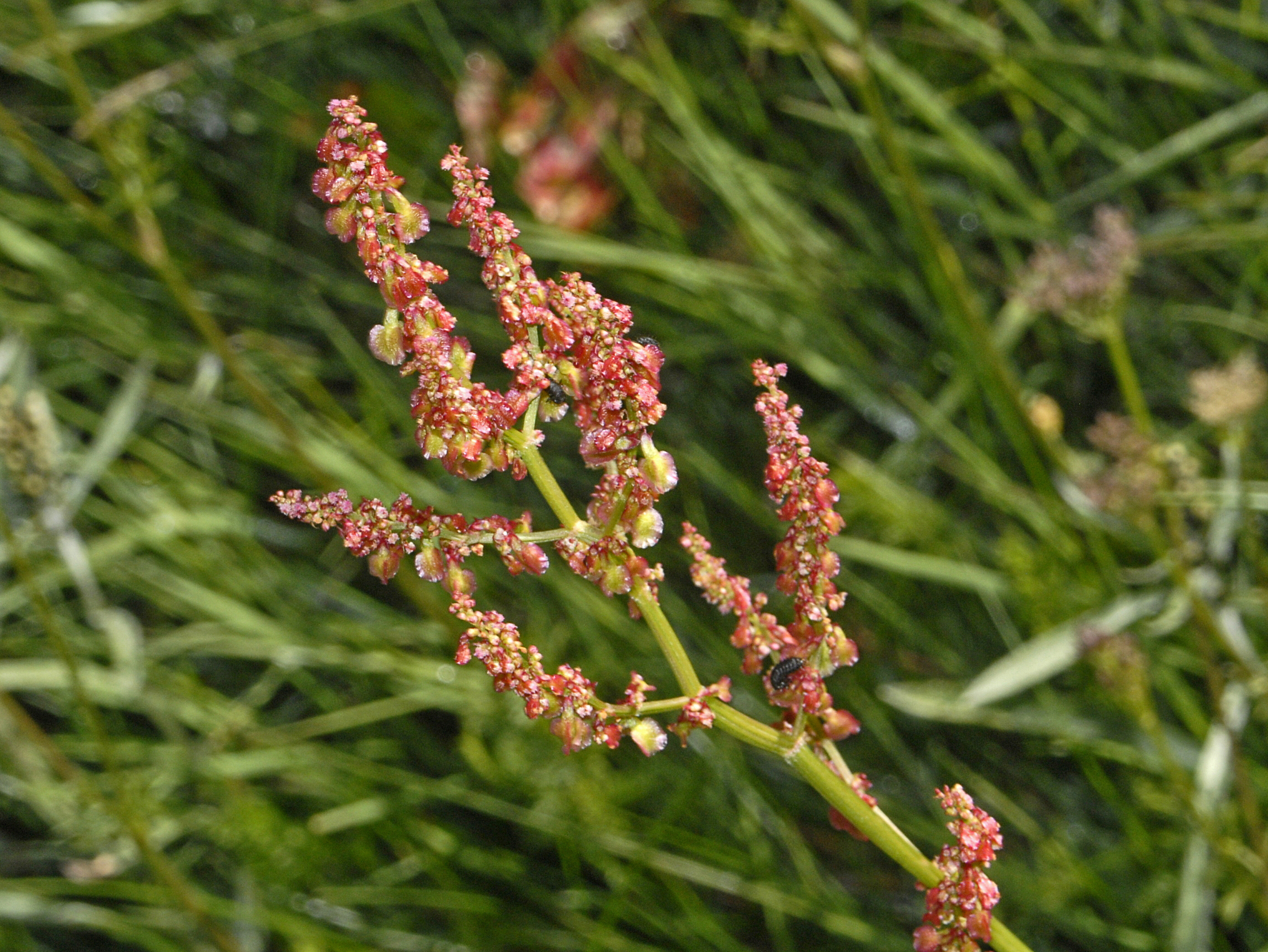
- At the Giardino Botanico Alpino Chanousia

Scientific classification
- Kingdom: Plantae
- Clade: Tracheophytes
- Clade: Angiosperms
- Clade: Eudicots
- Order: Caryophyllales
- Family: Polygonaceae
- Genus: Rumex
- Species: R. arifolius

Binomial name
- Rumex arifolius All.

Synonyms
- List: Acetosa alpestris subsp. carpatica (Zapal.) Dostál; Acetosa alpina Mill.; Acetosa alpina subsp. amplexicaulis (Lapeyr.) Holub; Acetosa arifolia (All.) Schur; Lapathum montanum Bubani; Rumex acetosa subsp. amplexicaulis (Lapeyr.) O.Bolòs & Vigo; Rumex allionii Link; Rumex amplexicaulis Lapeyr.; Rumex carpaticus (Zapal.) Zapal.; Rumex dimorphus Gren.; Rumex erythrocarpus Gand.; Rumex hispanicus C.C.Gmel.; Rumex italicus Campd.; Rumex macrophyllus Campd.; Rumex montanus Desf.; Rumex pilatensis Gand.

= Rumex arifolius =

Species of herb

Rumex arifolius, common name maiden sorrel or mountain dock, is a leafy perennial herb in the family Polygonaceae.

== Description ==
Rumex arifolius can reach a height of 70–120 centimetres (28–47 in). This plant has fleshy large leaves with entire blade margins. The inconspicuous white flowers and seeds are carried on long clusters at the top of a stalk arising from the axil of leaves. The flowers are dioecious and anemophilous. They bloom from May to June.

== Taxonomy ==
Rumex arifolius was first described by Carl Christian Gmelin in 1806.

== Distribution ==
Maiden sorrel is native to southern Europe, and parts of northern temperate Asia.

== Habitat ==
This species prefers pine forests and mountainous meadows at elevation of 200–700 metres (660–2,300 ft) above sea level.

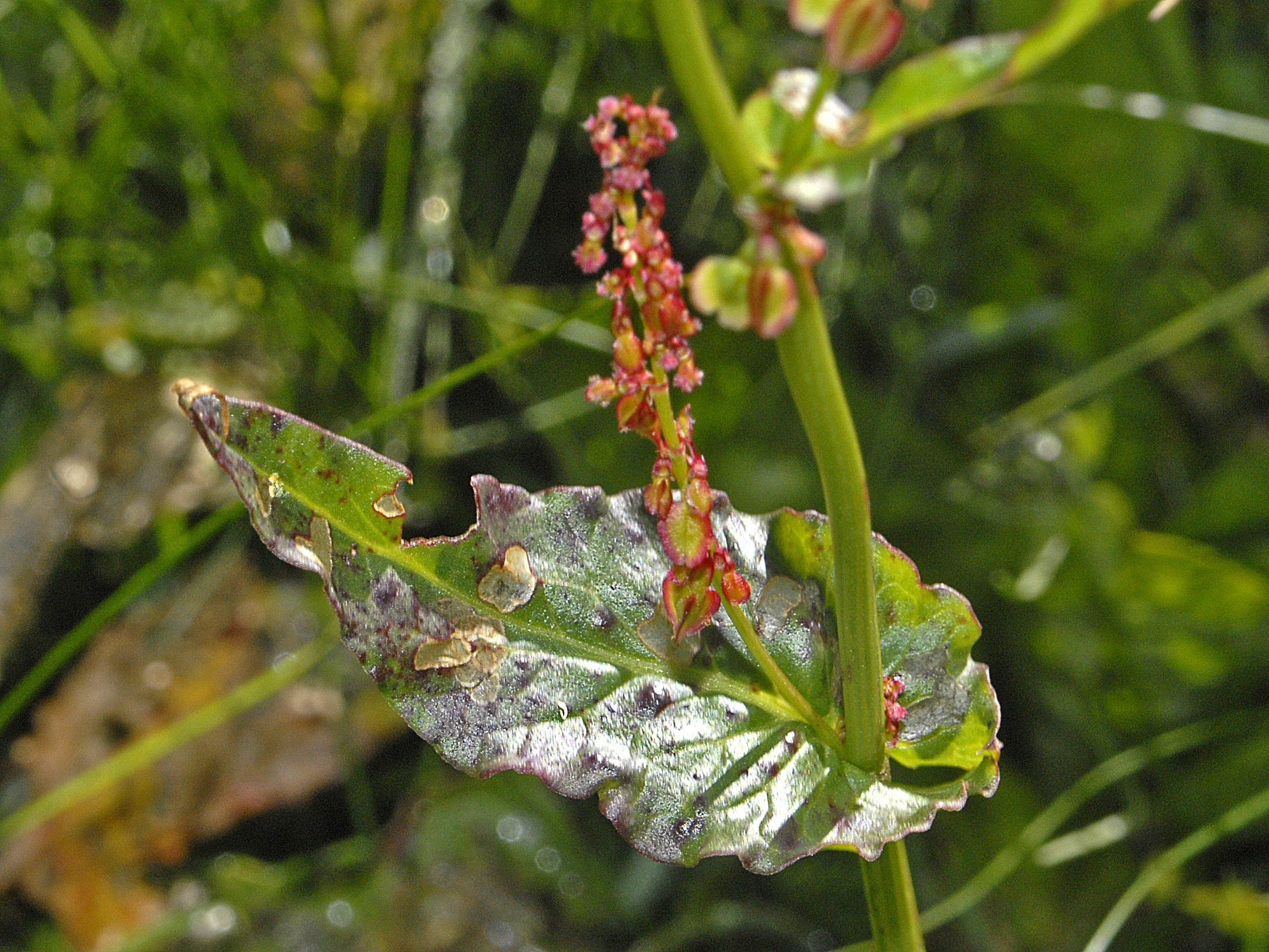
Leaf
