= Rumex floridanus =

Scientific classification
- Kingdom: Plantae
- Clade: Tracheophytes
- Clade: Angiosperms
- Clade: Eudicots
- Order: Caryophyllales
- Family: Polygonaceae
- Genus: Rumex
- Species: R. floridanus

Binomial name
- Rumex floridanus Meisn.

Species of flowering plant

Rumex floridanus is a perennial flowering plant, in the family Polygonaceae. The common name for this species is Florida dock.

== Description ==
The stems are upright and the leaves have lateral veins. They are lanceolate in shape. The flowers are attached in a whorled pattern. The whorls are closer together towards the top of the plant. The flowers have tepals, as it is difficult to differentiate between the petals and sepals. Flowers are in the deltoid shape. Its fruits are brown and achenes.

== Distribution ==
R. floridanus is native to the Southeastern United States. It has been found in Florida, Georgia, Alabama, Louisiana, South Carolina, Mississippi, New Jersey, and Maryland. R. floridanus is common in marshes, swamps, and bogs.

== Taxonomy ==
R. floridanus was first described by Carl Daniel Friedrich Meisner in Prodromus Systematis Naturalis Regni Vegetabilis in 1856. Some sources believe that R. floridanus is closely related to R. verticillatus. Others say that the two are synonymous.
