= List of Euphorbiales of Montana =

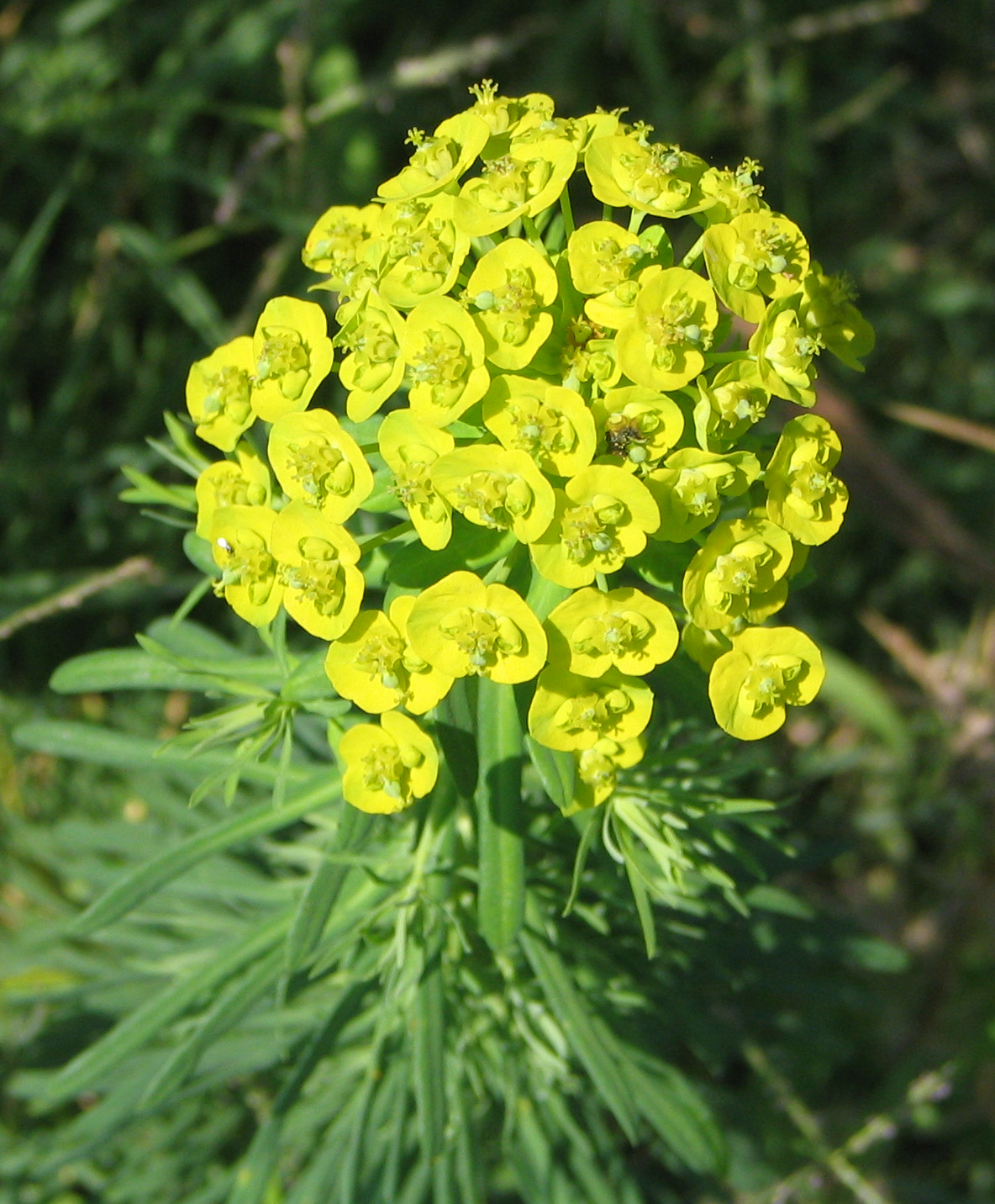
Cypress spurge, Euphorbia cyparissias

There are at least 16 members of the spurge genus (Euphorbia) found in Montana. Some of these species are exotics (not native to Montana).

- Euphorbia agraria, urban spurge
- Euphorbia brachycera, horned spurge
- Euphorbia cyparissias, cypress spurge
- Euphorbia esula, leafy spurge
- Euphorbia geyeri, Geyer's spurge
- Euphorbia glyptosperma, corrugate-seed broomspurge
- Euphorbia helioscopia, summer spurge
- Euphorbia hexagona, six-angle spurge
- Euphorbia marginata, snow-on-the-mountain
- Euphorbia missurica, prairie broomspurge
- Euphorbia oblongata, eggleaf spurge
- Euphorbia peplus, petty spurge
- Euphorbia serpens, matted broomspurge
- Euphorbia serpyllifolia, thyme-leaf broomspurge
- Euphorbia spathulata, reticulate-seeded spurge
- Euphorbia supina, spotted spurge

== See also ==
- List of dicotyledons of Montana
