= List of Polygonales of Montana =

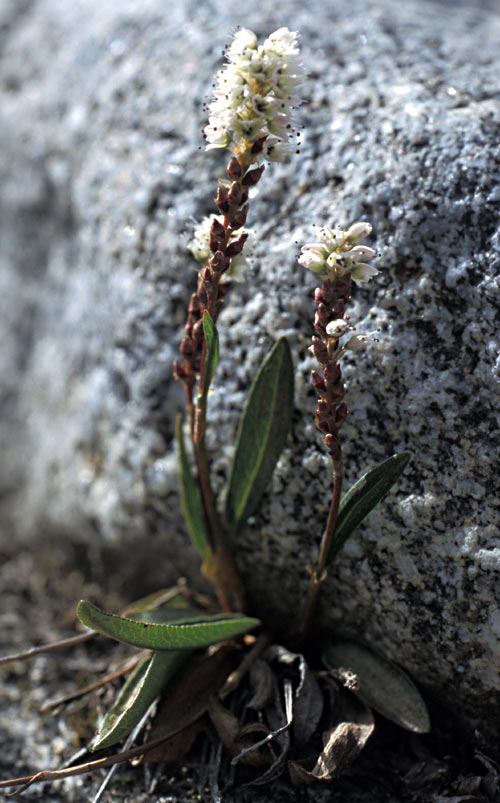
Alpine bistort

At least 72 members of the buckwheat order, Polygonales, are found in Montana. Some of these species are exotics (not native to Montana) and some species have been designated as species of concern.

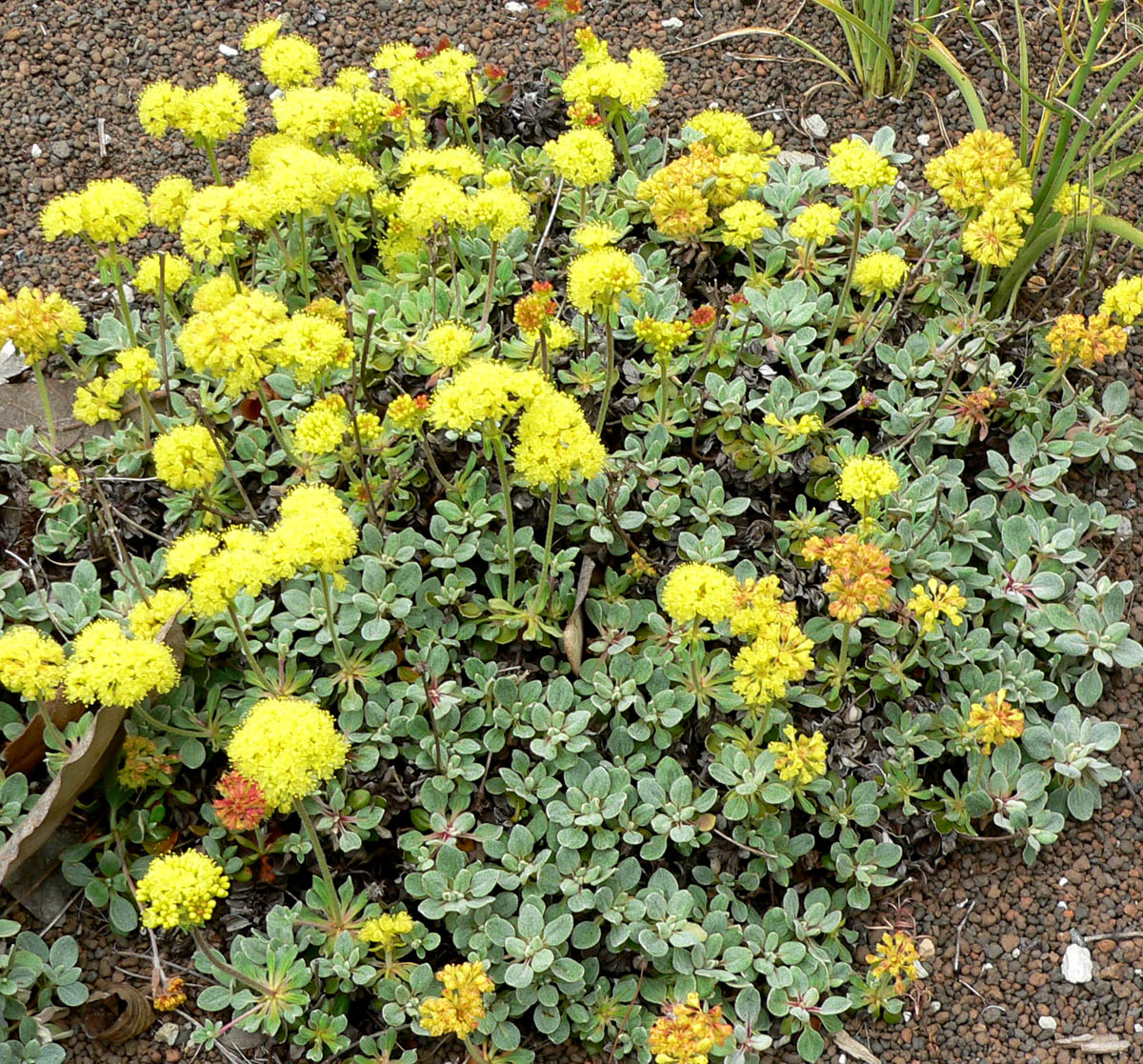
Sulphur flower buckwheat

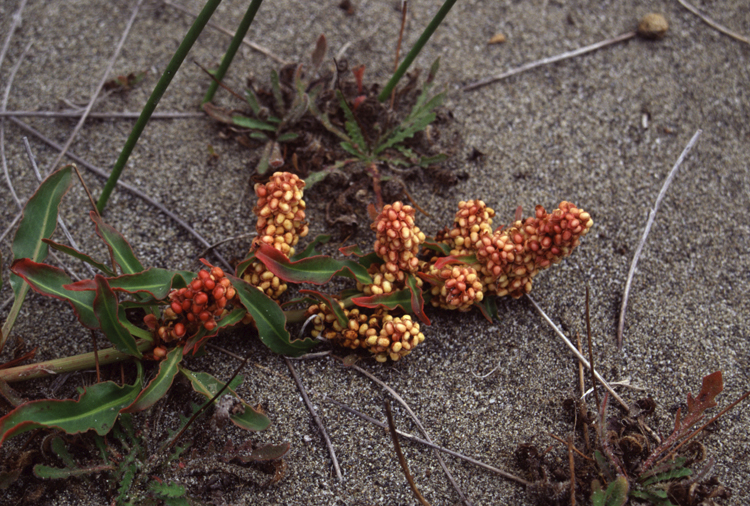
Willow dock

- Eriogonum androsaceum, rock-jasmine wild buckwheat
- Eriogonum annuum, annual buckwheat
- Eriogonum brevicaule var. canum, rabbit buckwheat
- Eriogonum caespitosum, mat buckwheat
- Eriogonum capistratum var. muhlickii, Muhlick's buckwheat
- Eriogonum cernuum, nodding wild buckwheat
- Eriogonum effusum, spreading wild buckwheat
- Eriogonum flavum, yellow wild buckwheat
- Eriogonum flavum var. flavum
- Eriogonum flavum var. piperi
- Eriogonum heracleoides, parsnip-flower buckwheat
- Eriogonum mancum, imperfect wild buckwheat
- Eriogonum microthecum, slender buckwheat
- Eriogonum ovalifolium, oval-leaved buckwheat
- Eriogonum ovalifolium var. depressum, cushion wild buckwheat
- Eriogonum ovalifolium var. ochroleucum, oval-leaf buckwheat
- Eriogonum ovalifolium var. ovalifolium, oval-leaf buckwheat
- Eriogonum ovalifolium var. pansum, oval-leaf buckwheat
- Eriogonum ovalifolium var. purpureum, cushion wild buckwheat
- Eriogonum pauciflorum, small-flowered buckwheat
- Eriogonum pyrolifolium, pyrola-leaved buckwheat
- Eriogonum salsuginosum, smooth buckwheat
- Eriogonum soliceps, Railroad Canyon wild buckwheat
- Eriogonum strictum, Blue Mountain wild buckwheat
- Eriogonum umbellatum, sulphur-flowered buckwheat
- Eriogonum umbellatum var. aureum, sulphur-flowered buckwheat
- Eriogonum umbellatum var. deserticum, sulphur-flower buckwheat
- Eriogonum umbellatum var. dichrocephalum, sulphur-flower buckwheat
- Eriogonum umbellatum var. ellipticum, starry buckwheat
- Eriogonum umbellatum var. majus, sulphur-flower buckwheat
- Eriogonum umbellatum var. umbellatum, sulphur-flower buckwheat
- Eriogonum visheri, Visher's buckwheat
- Koenigia islandica, Iceland koenigia
- Oxyria digyna, mountain-sorrel
- Persicaria punctata, dotted smartweed
- Polygonum achoreum, leathery knotweed
- Polygonum amphibium, water smartweed
- Polygonum austiniae, Austin's knotweed
- Polygonum aviculare, knotweed
- Polygonum bistortoides, American bistort
- Polygonum convolvulus, black bindweed
- Polygonum douglasii, Douglas knotweed
- Polygonum engelmannii, Engelmann's knotweed
- Polygonum erectum, erect knotweed
- Polygonum hydropiper, marshpepper smartweed
- Polygonum lapathifolium, dock-leaf smartweed
- Polygonum majus, large knotweed
- Polygonum minimum, leafy dwarf knotweed
- Polygonum pensylvanicum, Pennsylvania smartweed
- Polygonum persicaria, lady's thumb smartweed
- Polygonum phytolaccifolium, poke knotweed
- Polygonum polygaloides, white-margin knotweed
- Polygonum polygaloides subsp. confertiflorum, dense-flower knotweed
- Polygonum polygaloides subsp. kelloggii, Kellogg's knotweed
- Polygonum ramosissimum, bushy knotweed
- Polygonum sachalinense, giant knotweed
- Polygonum sawatchense, Johnston's knotweed
- Polygonum spergulariiforme, scatter knotweed
- Polygonum viviparum, alpine bistort
- Reynoutria japonica (syn. Polygonum cuspidatum), Japanese knotweed
- Rumex acetosa, common sorrel
- Rumex acetosella, sheep sorrel
- Rumex crispus, curly dock
- Rumex fueginus, sea-side dock
- Rumex hymenosepalus, canaigre dock
- Rumex obtusifolius, bitter dock
- Rumex occidentalis, western dock
- Rumex patientia, patience dock
- Rumex paucifolius, alpine sheep sorrel
- Rumex salicifolius, willow dock
- Rumex stenophyllus, narrowleaf dock
- Rumex venosus, veined dock

== See also ==
- List of dicotyledons of Montana
