= List of Rubiales of Montana =

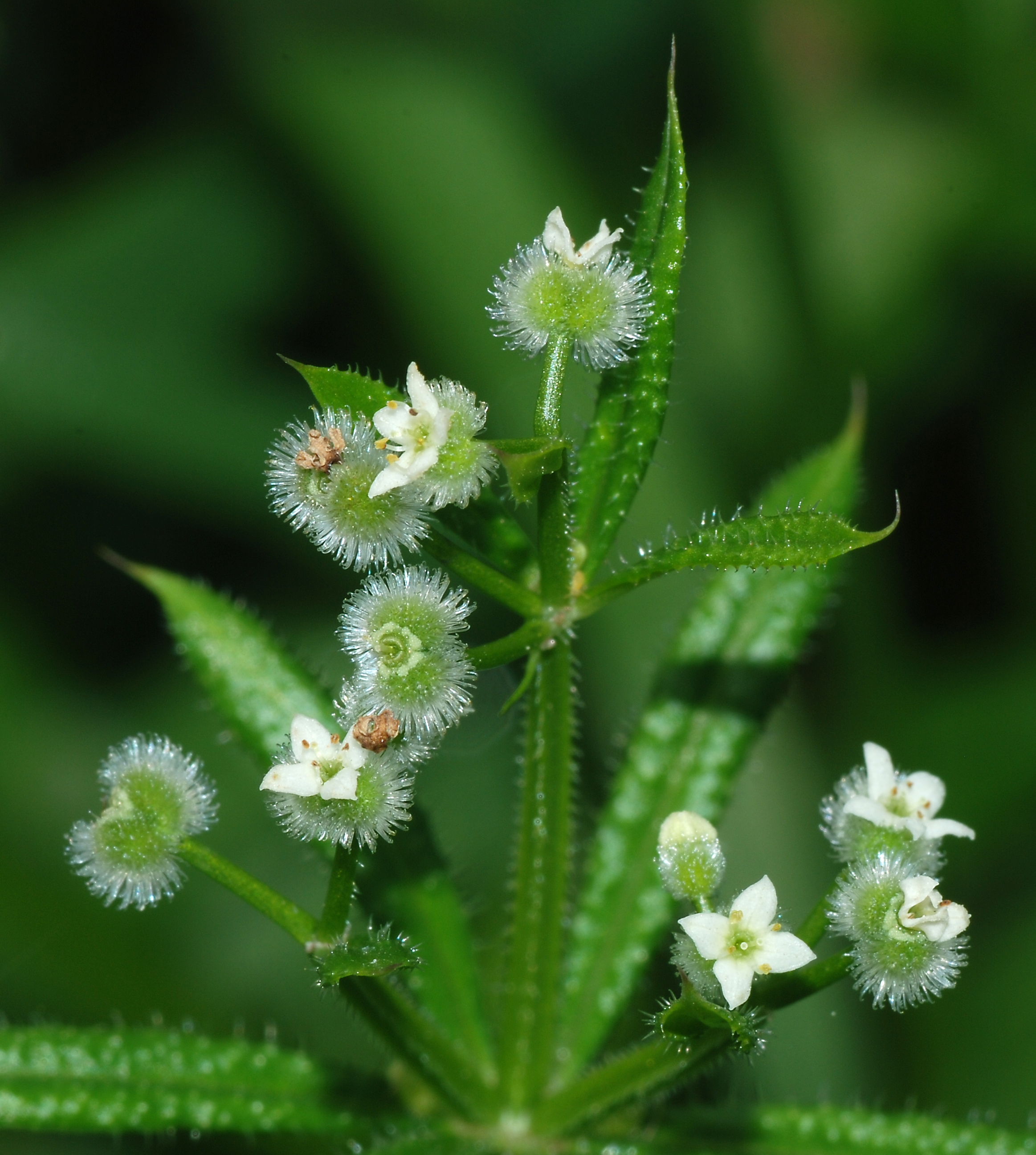
Catchweed bedstraw

There are at least 13 members of the bedstraw and madder family, Rubiaceae, found in Montana. Some of these species are exotics (not native to Montana) and some species have been designated as species of concern.

- Catchweed bedstraw, Galium aparine
- Baby's breath, Galium mollugo
- Kelloggia, Kelloggia galioides
- Low mountain bedstraw, Galium bifolium
- Mexican bedstraw, Galium mexicanum
- Northern bedstraw, Galium boreale
- Piedmont-bedstraw, Galium pedemontanum
- Small bedstraw, Galium trifidum
  - Galium trifidum subsp. columbianum
  - Galium trifidum subsp. trifidum
  - Galium trifidum subsp. subbiflorum
- Sweet-scent bedstraw, Galium triflorum
- Spring bedstraw, Galium verum

== See also ==
- List of dicotyledons of Montana
