= Eriogonum visheri =

Conservation status
- Vulnerable (NatureServe)

Scientific classification
- Kingdom: Plantae
- Clade: Tracheophytes
- Clade: Angiosperms
- Clade: Eudicots
- Order: Caryophyllales
- Family: Polygonaceae
- Genus: Eriogonum
- Species: E. visheri

Binomial name
- Eriogonum visheri A.Nelson

Species of wild buckwheat

Eriogonum visheri is a species of wild buckwheat known by the common names Dakota wild buckwheat and Visher's buckwheat. It is native to the Great Plains in the United States, where it is known from North Dakota, South Dakota, and Montana.

This plant is an annual herb with erect stems growing up to 10 centimeters tall. It is described as "skeletal" or "skeleton-like" in appearance. Leaves around the base of the plant are up to 2.5 centimeters long by 2.5 wide, and leaves higher on the stem are similar but smaller. The stems branch into an inflorescence studded with clusters of small yellowish flowers. Flowering occurs in June through September.

The center of the plant's distribution is in South Dakota, and it extends into North Dakota and one county in Montana. The species is protected on the Buffalo Gap National Grassland in South Dakota. It occupied badlands habitat, harsh, sparsely vegetated terrain. It is a pioneer species, growing on bare outcrops unoccupied by any other plants. The substrate experiences high rates of erosion and deposition, as well as high winds that may create blowouts in the soil. The plant has few competitors. The substrate often has little actual soil, and is more of a rock outcropping with pockets of fine entisols with little organic matter. The soils are high in calcium and sodium. The climate is characterized by wide variations in temperature and relatively little precipitation.

While vegetation is sparse at these sites, associated species may include Agropyron dasystachyum, Agropyron smithii, Artemisia tridentata, Astragalus racemosus, Atriplex argentea, Atriplex nuttallii, Distichlis spicata, Eriogonum pauciflorum, Grindelia squarrosa, Gutierrezia sarothrae, Machaeranthera canescens, Melilotus officinalis, Oenethera cespitosa, Salsola iberica, and Sarcobatus vermiculatus in North Dakota. In South Dakota Agropyron trachycaulum, Artemisia cana, Atriplex canescens, Chrysothamnus nauseosus, Dyssodia papposa, Kochia scoparia, Oryzopsis hymenoides, Polygonum ramosissimum, Solanum rostratum, Sphaeralcea coccinea, and Helianthus annuus also occur.

There are fewer than 100 occurrences of this species. Threats include cattle grazing and trampling, however, the plant grows at sites with little vegetation and these sites are avoided by cattle. In addition, the cattle do not seem to graze the species directly. Trampling by the animals degrades the habitat and spreads introduced species of plants. The worst invasive plants are Salsola iberica and Kochia scoparia. Mining is a potential threat, as there are deposits of coal in the area. It is not a current threat. While this plant is considered a "sensitive" species by the United States Forest Service, it is no longer a candidate for federal protection.
