= List of Nymphaeales of Montana =

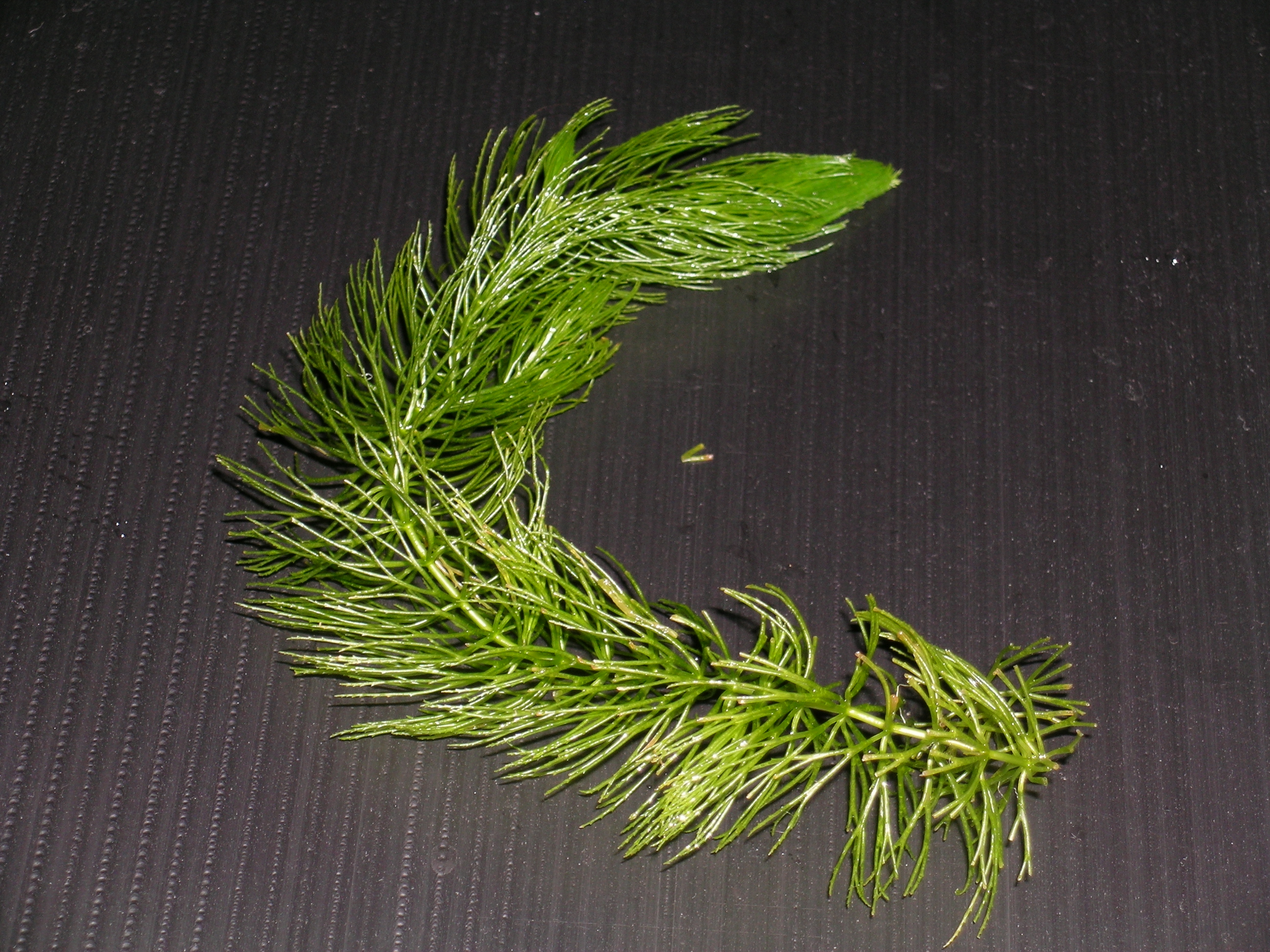
Common hornwort

There are at least six members of the water-lily and watershields order, Nymphaeales, found in Montana. Some of these species are exotics (not native to Montana) and some species have been designated as Species of Concern.

== Hornworts ==
Family: Ceratophyllaceae

- Ceratophyllum demersum, common hornwort

== Water-lilies ==
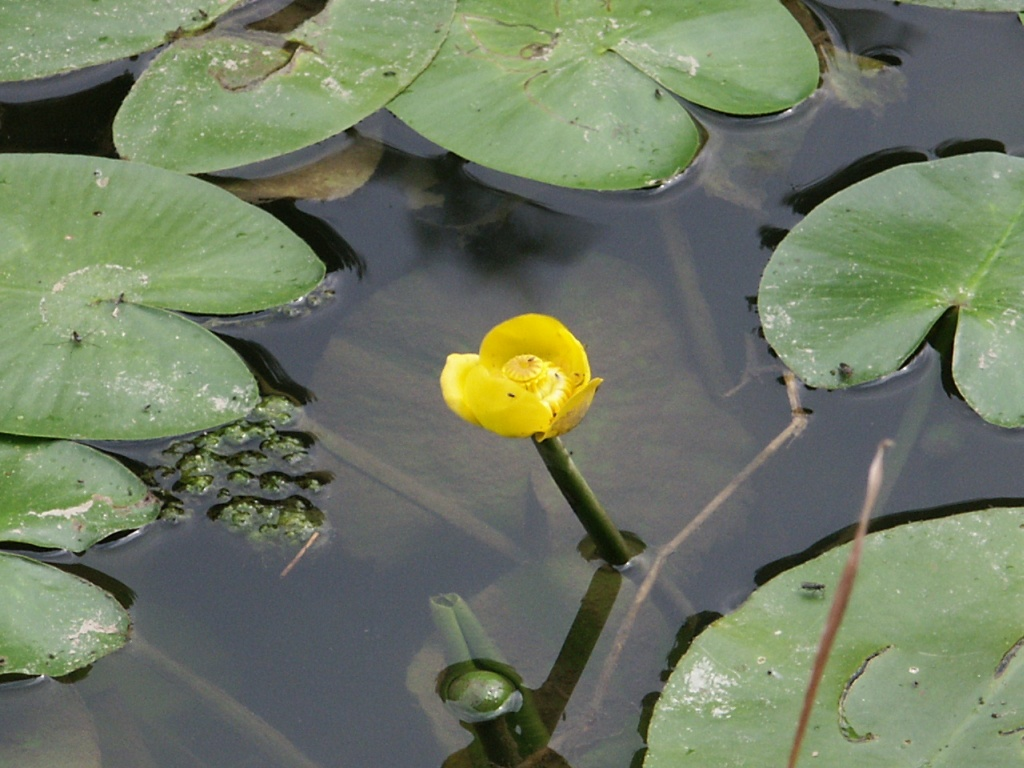
Variegated pond-lily

Family: Nymphaeaceae

- Nymphaea odorata, American water-lily
- Nymphaea leibergii, pygmy water-lily
- Nuphar variegata, varigated pond-lily
- Nuphar polysepala, yellow pond-lily

== Watershields ==
Family: Cabombaceae

- Brasenia schreberi, watershield

== See also ==
- List of dicotyledons of Montana
