= List of Malvales of Montana =

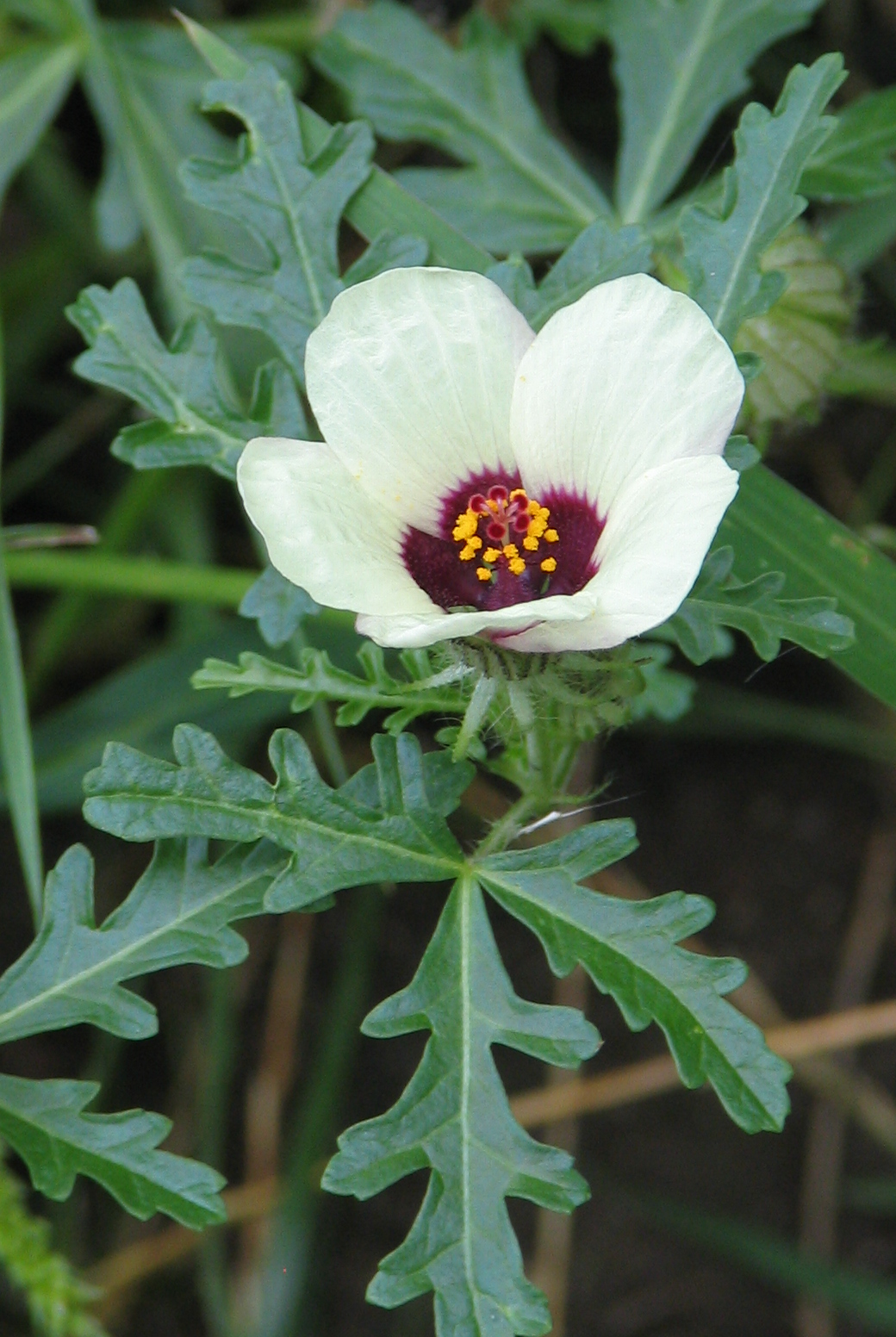
Flower-of-an-hour, Hibiscus trionum

There are at least 10 members of the Mallow order, Malvales, found in Montana. Some of these species are introduced species, not native to Montana. and some species have been designated as Species of Concern.

Family: Malvaceae

- Abutilon theophrasti, velvet-leaf
- Alcea rosea, hollyhock
- Hibiscus trionum, flower-of-an-hour
- Iliamna rivularis, streambank globemallow
- Malva moschata, musk cheeseweed
- Malva neglecta, dwarf cheeseweed
- Malva parviflora, small Whorled cheeseweed
- Sidalcea oregana, Oregon checker-mallow
- Sphaeralcea coccinea, scarlet globemallow
- Sphaeralcea munroana, white-stemmed globemallow

== See also ==
- List of dicotyledons of Montana
