= List of Rhamnales of Montana =

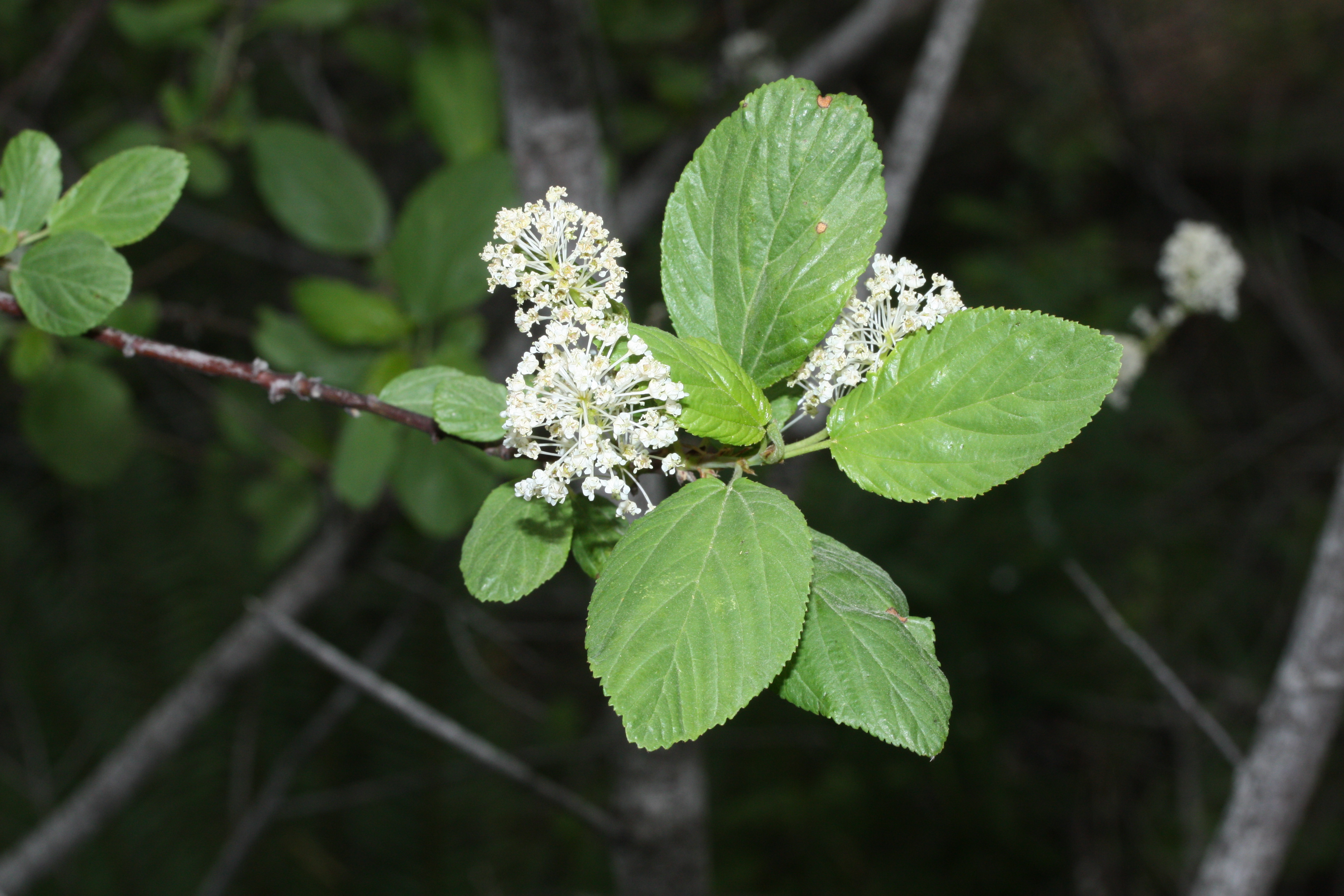
Redstem ceanothus

There are at least nine members of the buckthorn and grape order, Rhamnales, found in Montana. Some of these species are exotics (not native to Montana) and some species have been designated as Species of Concern.

== Buckthorns ==
Family: Rhamnaceae

- Ceanothus herbaceus, New Jersey tea
- Ceanothus sanguineus, redstem ceanothus
- Ceanothus velutinus, snowbrush ceanothus
- Frangula purshiana, Cascara false buckthorn
- Rhamnus alnifolia, alderleaf buckthorn
- Rhamnus cathartica, common buckthorn

== Grapes ==
Family: Vitaceae

- Parthenocissus quinquefolia, Virginia creeper
- Parthenocissus vitacea, woodbine
- Vitis riparia, riverbank grape

== See also ==
- List of dicotyledons of Montana
