= List of Campanulales of Montana =

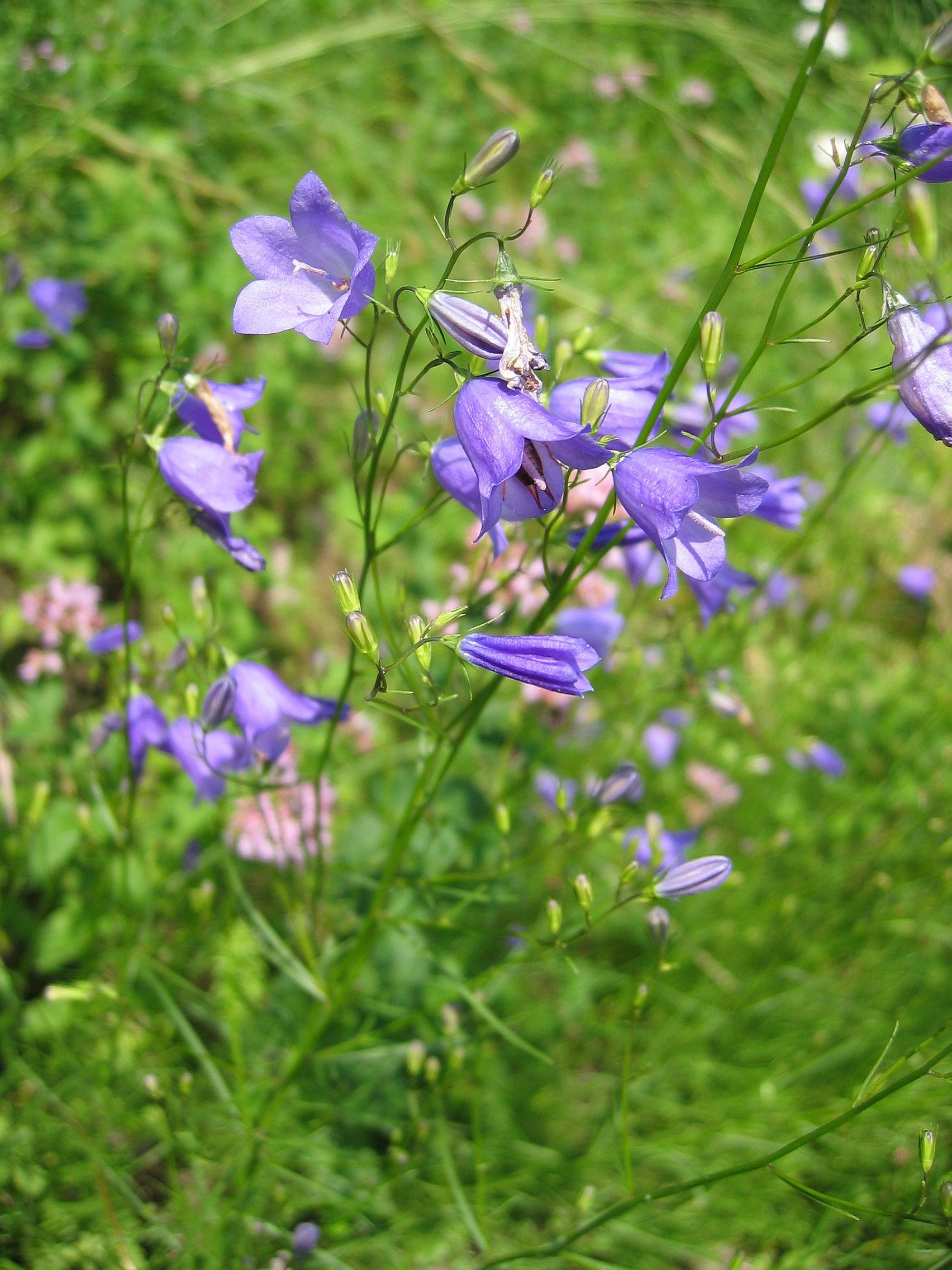
American harebell, Campanula rotundifolia

There are at least 15 members of the bellflower order, Campanulales, found in the state of Montana in the United States. They include some introduced species and some designated as species of concern.

The bellflowers of Montana are all in the family Campanulaceae:

- Campanula glomerata, clustered bellflower
- Campanula medium, Canterbury bells
- Campanula parryi, Parry's northern harebell
- Campanula rapunculoides, creeping bellflower
- Campanula rotundifolia, American harebell
- Campanula scabrella, rough harebell
- Campanula uniflora, arctic harebell
- Downingia laeta, Great Basin downingia
- Githopsis specularioides, common blue-cup
- Heterocodon rariflorum, western pearlflower
- Howellia aquatilis, water howellia
- Lobelia kalmii, Kalm's lobelia
- Lobelia spicata, pale-spiked lobelia
- Triodanis leptocarpa, slim-pod Venus'-looking-glass
- Triodanis perfoliata, claspingleaf Venus'-looking-glass

== See also ==
- List of dicotyledons of Montana
