= List of Sapindales of Montana =

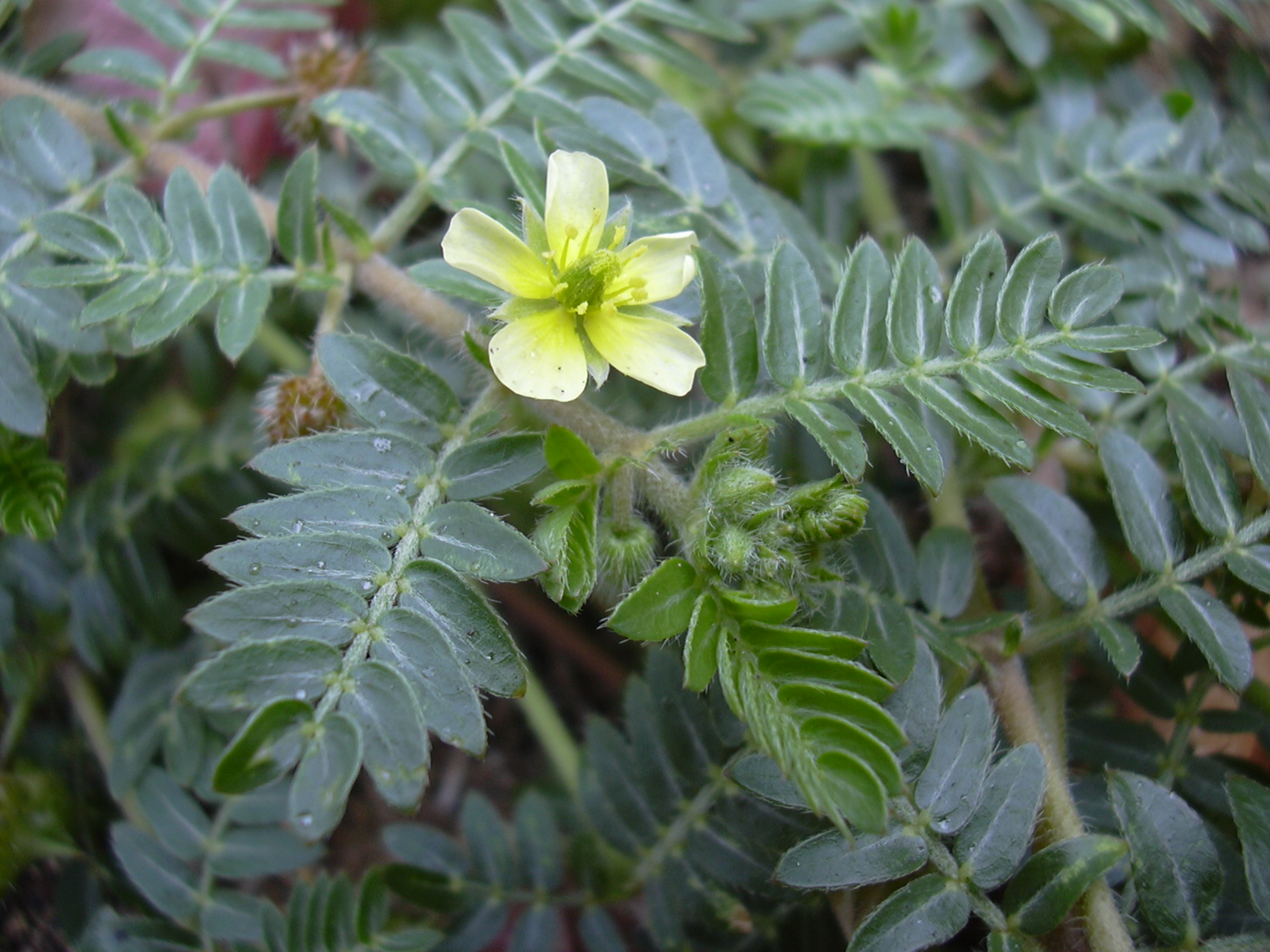
Puncture-vine, Tribulus terrestris

There are at least 8 members of the Creosote Bush, Maple and Sumac order: Sapindales found in Montana. Some of these species are exotics (not native to Montana).

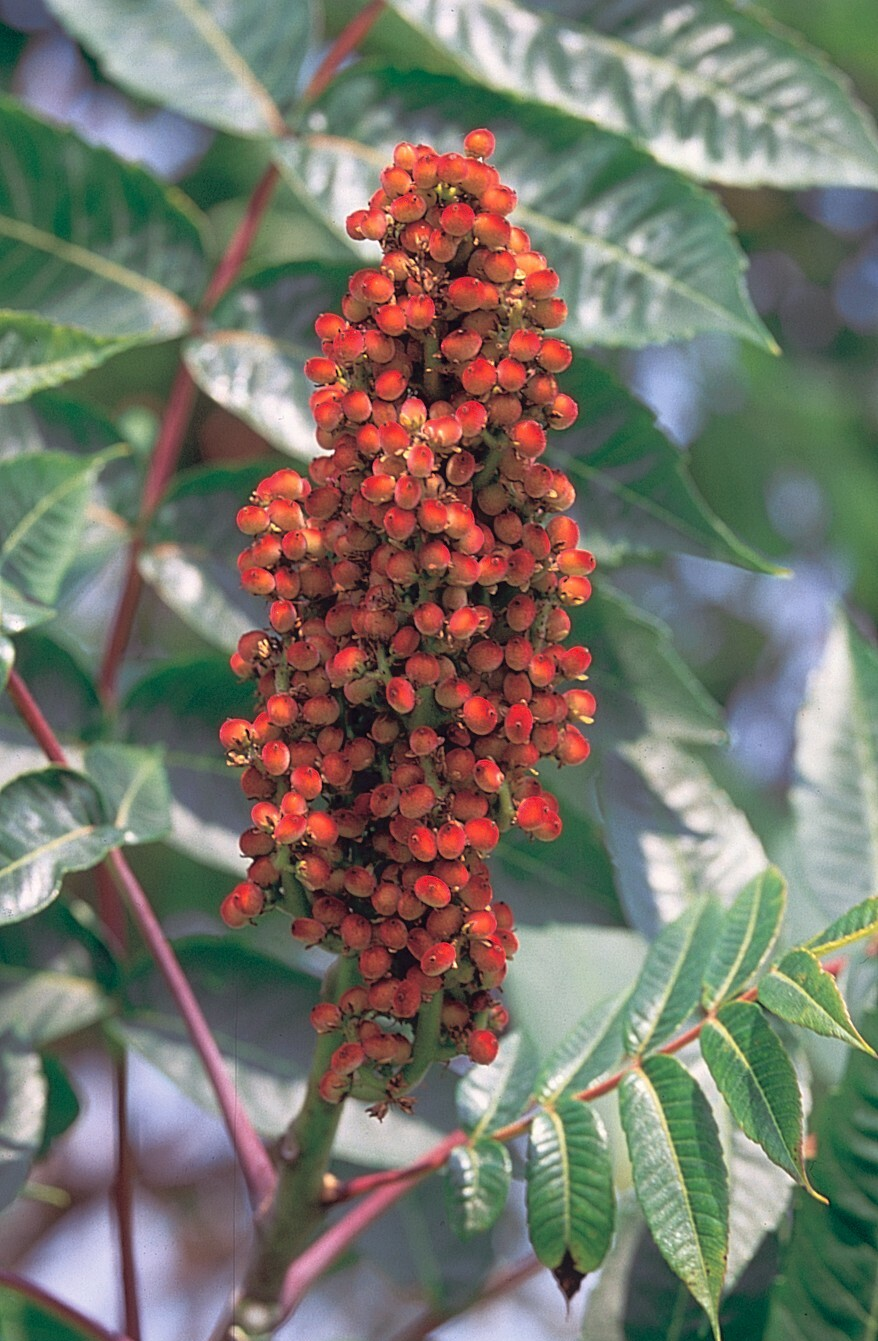
Smooth sumac, Rhus glabra

== Creosote bush ==
Family: Zygophyllaceae

- Tribulus terrestris, puncture-vine
- Zygophyllum fabago, Syrian bean-caper

== Maple ==
Family: Aceraceae

- Acer glabrum, Rocky Mountain maple
- Acer negundo, box-elder
- Acer platanoides, Norway maple

== Sumac ==
Family: Anacardiaceae

- Rhus glabra, smooth sumac
- Rhus trilobata, skunkbush sumac
- Toxicodendron rydbergii, western poison-ivy

== See also ==
- List of dicotyledons of Montana
