= List of dicotyledons of Montana =

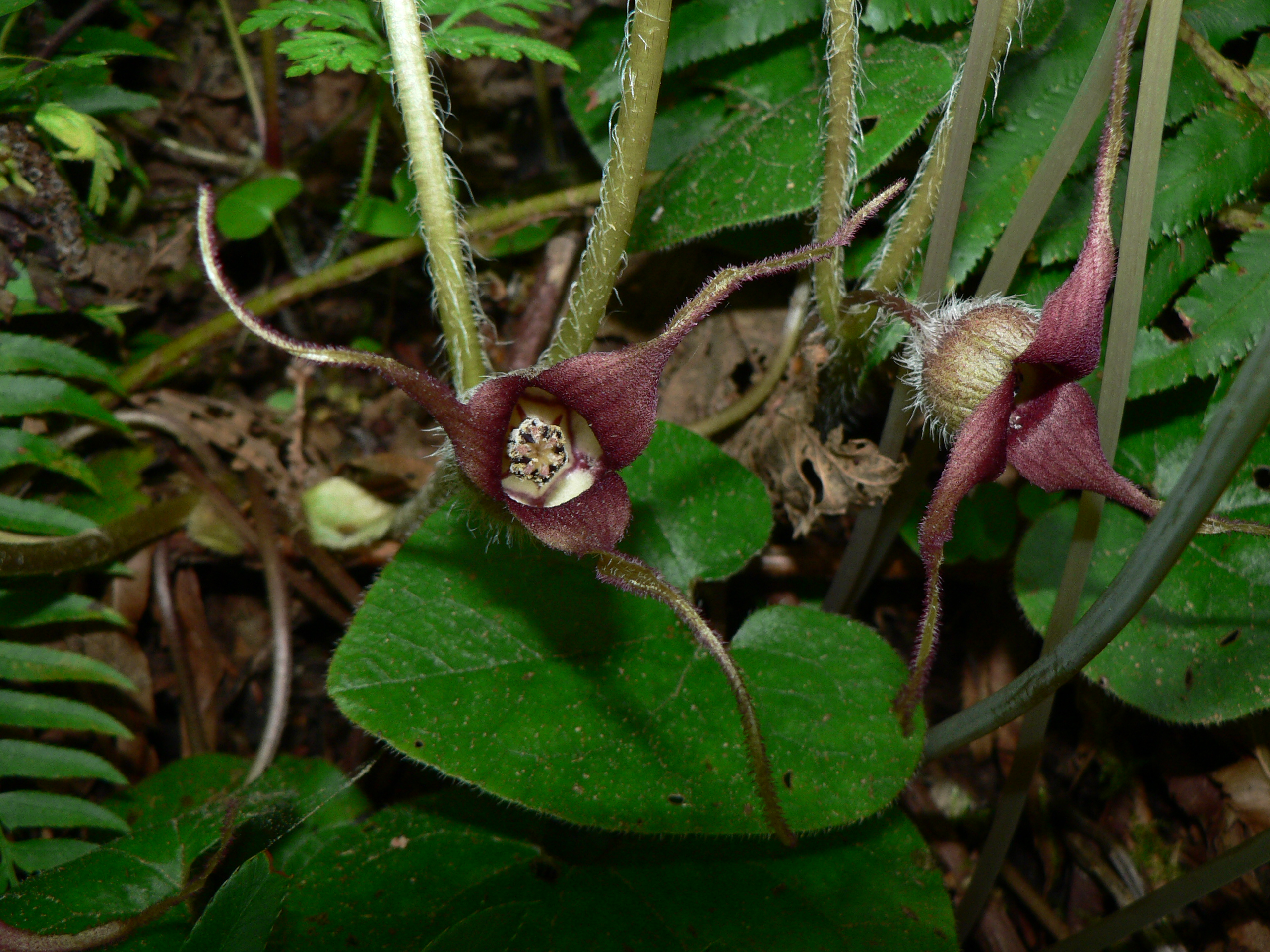
Asarum caudatum, wild ginger

There are at least 2109 species of dicotyledons found in Montana according to the Montana Field Guide. This is a list of Dicotyledoneae orders found in Montana. The Montana Natural Heritage Program has identified a number of dicot species as "Species of Concern". Some of these species are exotics (not native to Montana).

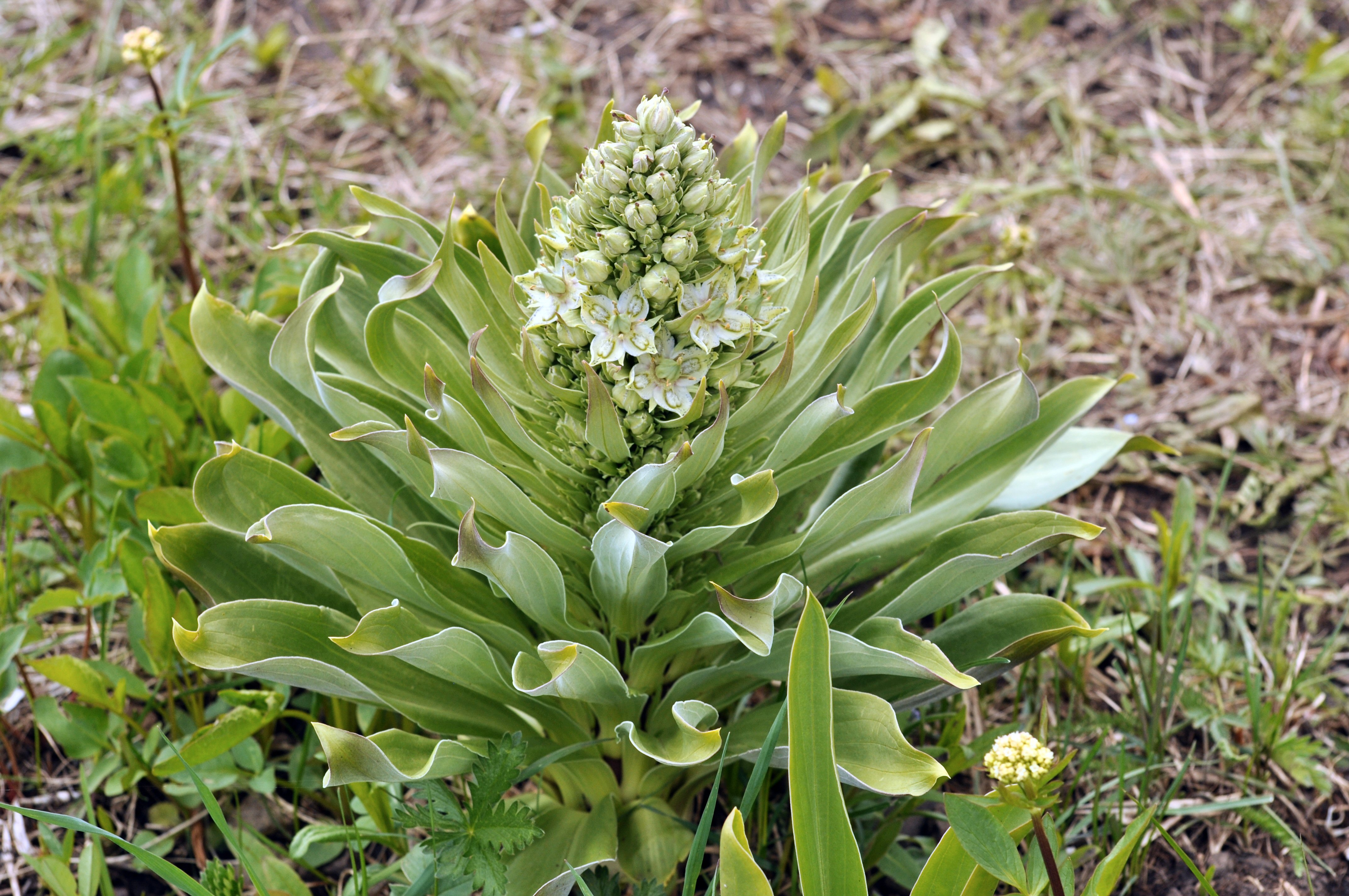
Frasera speciosa, green gentian

- List of Asterales of Montana (Order Asterales)
- List of Ranunculales of Montana (Order Ranunculales)
- List of Rubiales of Montana (Order Rubiales)
- List of Campanulales of Montana (Order Campanulales)
- List of Fagales of Montana (Order Fagales)
- List of Lamiales of Montana (Order Lamiales)
- List of Rhamnales of Montana (Order Rhamnales)
- List of Polygonales of Montana (Order Polygonales)
- List of Capparales of Montana (Order Capparales)
- List of Caryophyllales of Montana (Order Caryophyllales)
- Celastrales (Order Celastrales)
  - Celastrus scandens, bittersweet
  - Paxistima myrsinites, mountain-lover or Oregon boxleaf
- List of Dipsacales of Montana (Order Dipsacales)
- List of Gentianales of Montana (Order Gentianales)
- Dogwood (Order Cornales)
  - Cornus canadensis, Bunchberry dogwood
  - Cornus sericea, Red-osier dogwood
- List of Santalales of Montana (Order Santalales)
- List of Myrtales of Montana (Order Myrtales)
- Flax (Order Linales)
  - Linum australe, southern flax
  - Linum lewisii, prairie flax
  - Linum rigidum, stiff-stem flax
  - Linum rigidum var. compactum, Wyoming flax
  - Linum rigidum var. rigidum, stiff-stem flax
  - Linum usitatissimum, common flax
- List of Papaverales of Montana (Order Papaverales)
- List of Geraniales of Montana (Order Geraniales)
- Ginger (Order Aristolochiales)
  - Asarum caudatum, wild ginger
- List of Apiales of Montana (Order Apiales)
- List of Ericales of Montana (Order Ericales)
- List of Malvales of Montana (Order Malvales)
- List of Sapindales of Montana (Order Sapindales)
- Milkworts (Order Polygalales)
  - Polygala alba, white milkwort
  - Polygala verticillata, whorled milkwort
- Oleasters (Order Proteales)
  - Elaeagnus angustifolia, Russian olive
  - Elaeagnus commutata, American silverberry
  - Shepherdia argentea, silver buffaloberry
  - Shepherdia canadensis, Canada buffaloberry
- List of Fabales of Montana (Order Fabales)
- Peony (Order Dilleniales)
  - Paeonia brownii, western peony
- List of Plantaginales of Montana (Order Plantaginales)
- List of Primulales of Montana (Order Primulales)
- List of Rosales of Montana (Order Rosales)
- List of Scrophulariales of Montana (Order Scrophulariales)
- List of Solanales of Montana (Order Solanales)
- List of Euphorbiales of Montana (Order Euphorbiales)
- List of Theales of Montana (Order Theales)
- Sundews (Order Nepenthales)
  - Drosera anglica, English sundew
  - Drosera linearis, linear-leaved sundew
  - Drosera rotundifolia, roundleaf sundew
- List of Urticales of Montana (Order Urticales)
- List of Violales of Montana (Order Violales)
- Water milfoil (Order Haloragales)
  - Myriophyllum quitense, Andean water-milfoil
  - Myriophyllum sibiricum, common water-milfoil
  - Myriophyllum spicatum, Eurasian water-milfoil
  - Myriophyllum verticillatum, whorled water-milfoil
- List of Nymphaeales of Montana (Order Nymphaeales)
- Water-starworts and mare's-tails (Order Callitrichales)
  - Mare's tails, Family: Hippuridaceae
    - Hippuris vulgaris, common mare's-tail
  - Water-starworts, Family: Callitrichaceae
    - Callitriche hermaphroditica, autumnal water-starwort
    - Callitriche heterophylla, large water-starwort
    - Callitriche palustris, vernal water starwort
    - Callitriche stagnalis, pond water-starwort
- List of Salicales of Montana (Order Salicales)

== See also ==
- List of monocotyledons of Montana
- List of coniferous plants of Montana
- List of lichens of Montana
