= List of Santalales of Montana =

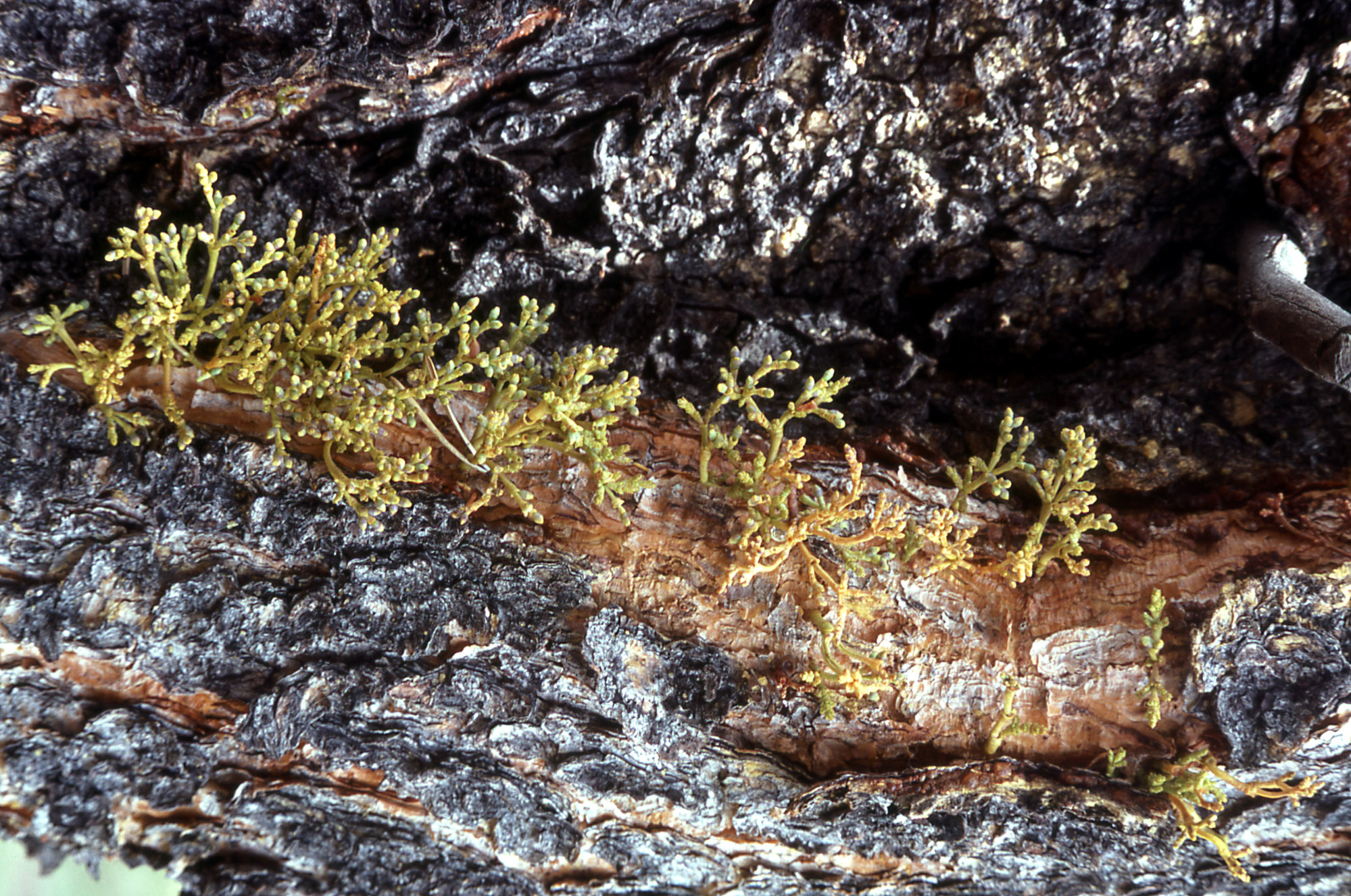
American dwarf-mistletoe, Arceuthobium americanum

There are at least eight members of the dwarf-mistletoe and sandalwood order, Santalales, found in Montana. Some of these species are exotics (not native to Montana) and some species have been designated as Species of Concern.

== Dwarf-mistletoes ==
Family: Viscaceae

- Arceuthobium americanum, American dwarf-mistletoe
- Arceuthobium campylopodum, western dwarf-mistletoe
- Arceuthobium cyanocarpum, limber pine dwarf-mistletoe
- Arceuthobium douglasii, Douglas-fir dwarf-mistletoe
- Arceuthobium laricis, larch dwarf-mistletoe

== Sandalwood ==
Family: Santalaceae

- Comandra umbellata, bastard toadflax
- Geocaulon lividum, northern bastard-toadflax
- Thesium arvense, thesium

== See also ==
- List of dicotyledons of Montana
