= Euphorbia rhabdotosperma =

Scientific classification
- Kingdom: Plantae
- Clade: Tracheophytes
- Clade: Angiosperms
- Clade: Eudicots
- Clade: Rosids
- Order: Malpighiales
- Family: Euphorbiaceae
- Genus: Euphorbia
- Species: E. rhabdotosperma

Binomial name
- Euphorbia rhabdotosperma Radcl.-Sm.

Species of plant

Euphorbia rhabdotosperma is a species of flowering plant in the Euphorbiaceae family.

== Description ==
A Euphorbia rather resembling a small Euphorbia helioscopia, with correspondingly smaller stem leaves (5-13(20) x 2-5(8) mm), raylet leaves (5-11 x 3-7 mm) and fruit (2.5-3 mm), and critically differing by its seed surface. See PoWo herbarium specimen.

Seed surface vs. E. helioscopia is longitudinally striate-rugulose vs. favose-reticulate. / striate-rugulose vs. foveolate(-reticulate) This is an unusual surface.

== Distribution ==
Native to Iran, North Caucasus, Transcaucasus, Turkey, Turkmenistan (PoWo map).

Turkish regional distribution is Antalya and northwards (map bizimbitkiler.org.tr).

== Habitat ==
Generally : River banks, foothills, edge of irrigated fields, limestone rocks, steppes; 1100-1400 m.

Turkey : Steppe, limestone rocks, fields, 1100-1300 m.

Iran : Steppes, edge of fields and orchards, at 500-1600 m.
