= List of Fagales of Montana =

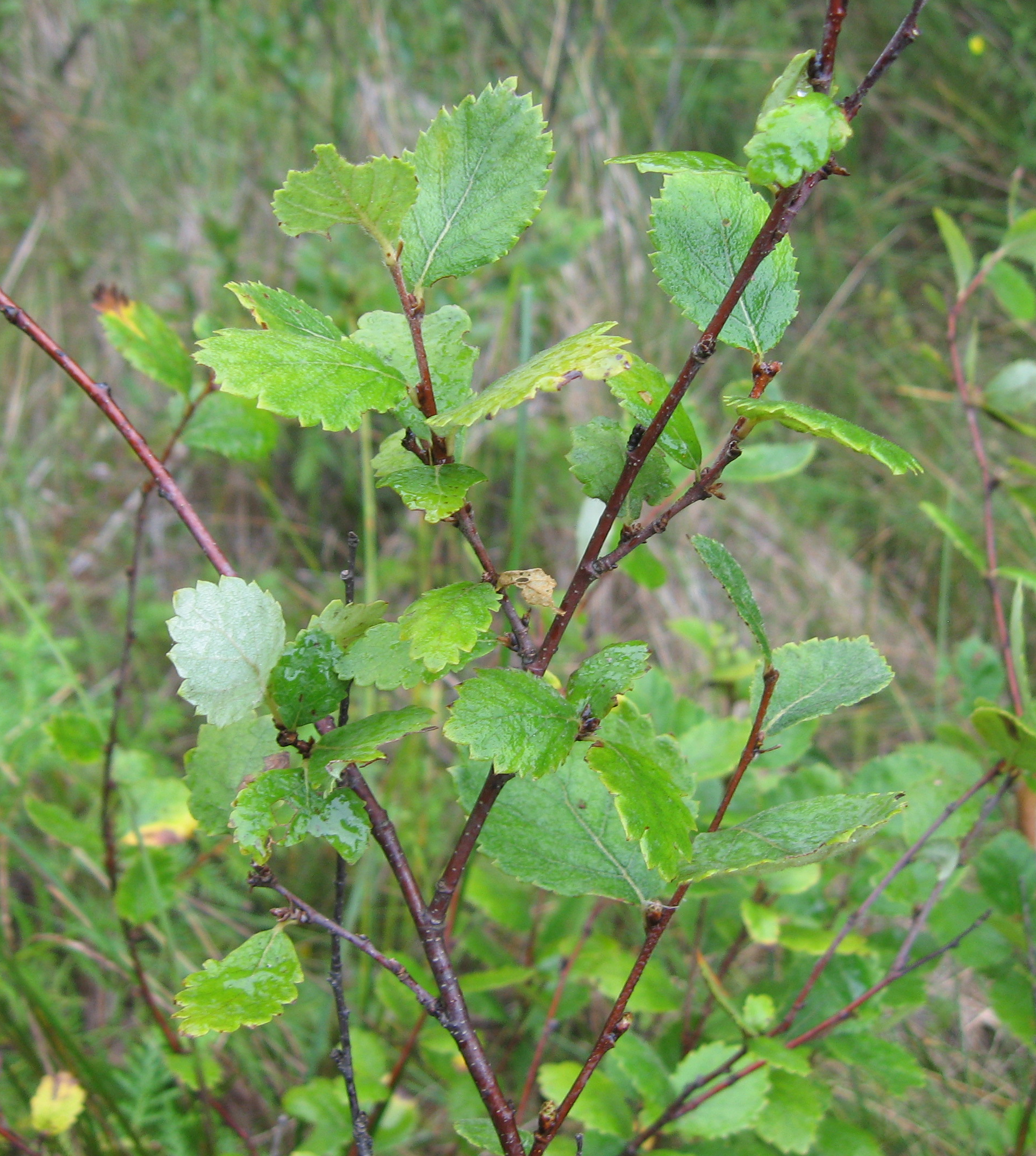
Bog birch

There are at least 10 members of the birch, alder, and oak order, Fagales found in Montana. Some of these species have been designated as Species of Concern.

== Beech and oaks ==
Family: Fagaceae

- Quercus macrocarpa, bur oak

== Birch and alder ==
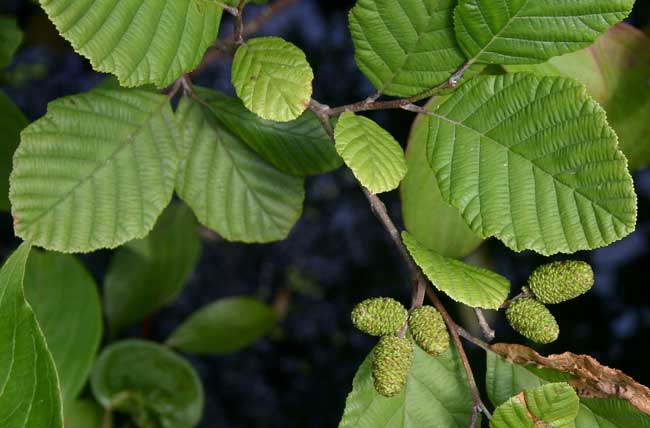
Speckled alder

Family: Betulaceae

- Alnus incana, speckled alder
- Alnus rubra, red alder
- Alnus viridis, green alder
- Betula nana, swamp birch
- Betula occidentalis, spring birch
- Betula papyrifera, paper birch
- Betula pumila, bog birch
- Betula × sargentii, hybrid birch
- Betula × utahensis, hybrid birch

== See also ==
- List of dicotyledons of Montana
