= List of Theales of Montana =

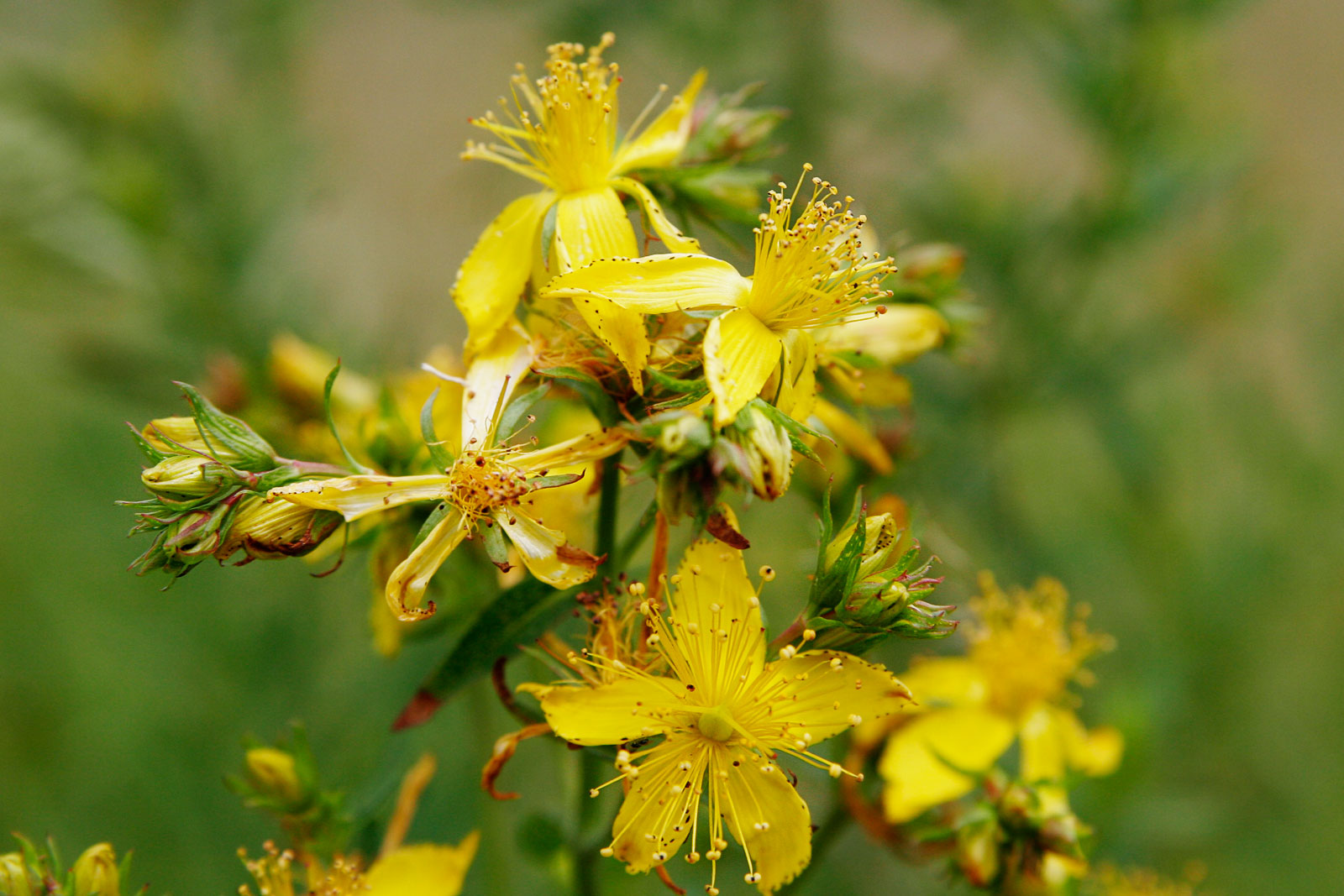
Common St. John's-wort, Hypericum perforatum

There are at least nine members of the St. Johnswort and Waterwort order: Theales found in Montana. Some of these species are exotics (not native to Montana).

== St. John's wort ==
Family: Clusiaceae

- Hypericum anagalloides, tinker's-penny
- Hypericum majus, larger Canadian St. John's-wort
- Hypericum perforatum, common St. John's-wort
- Hypericum scouleri, western St. John's-wort
- Hypericum scouleri subsp. nortoniae, western St. John's-wort
- Hypericum scouleri subsp. scouleri, Scouler's St. Johns-wort

== Waterwort ==
Family: Elatinaceae

- Elatine brachysperma, short-seeded water-wort
- Elatine californica, California water-wort
- Elatine triandra, longstem water-wort

== See also ==
- List of dicotyledons of Montana
