= List of Urticales of Montana =

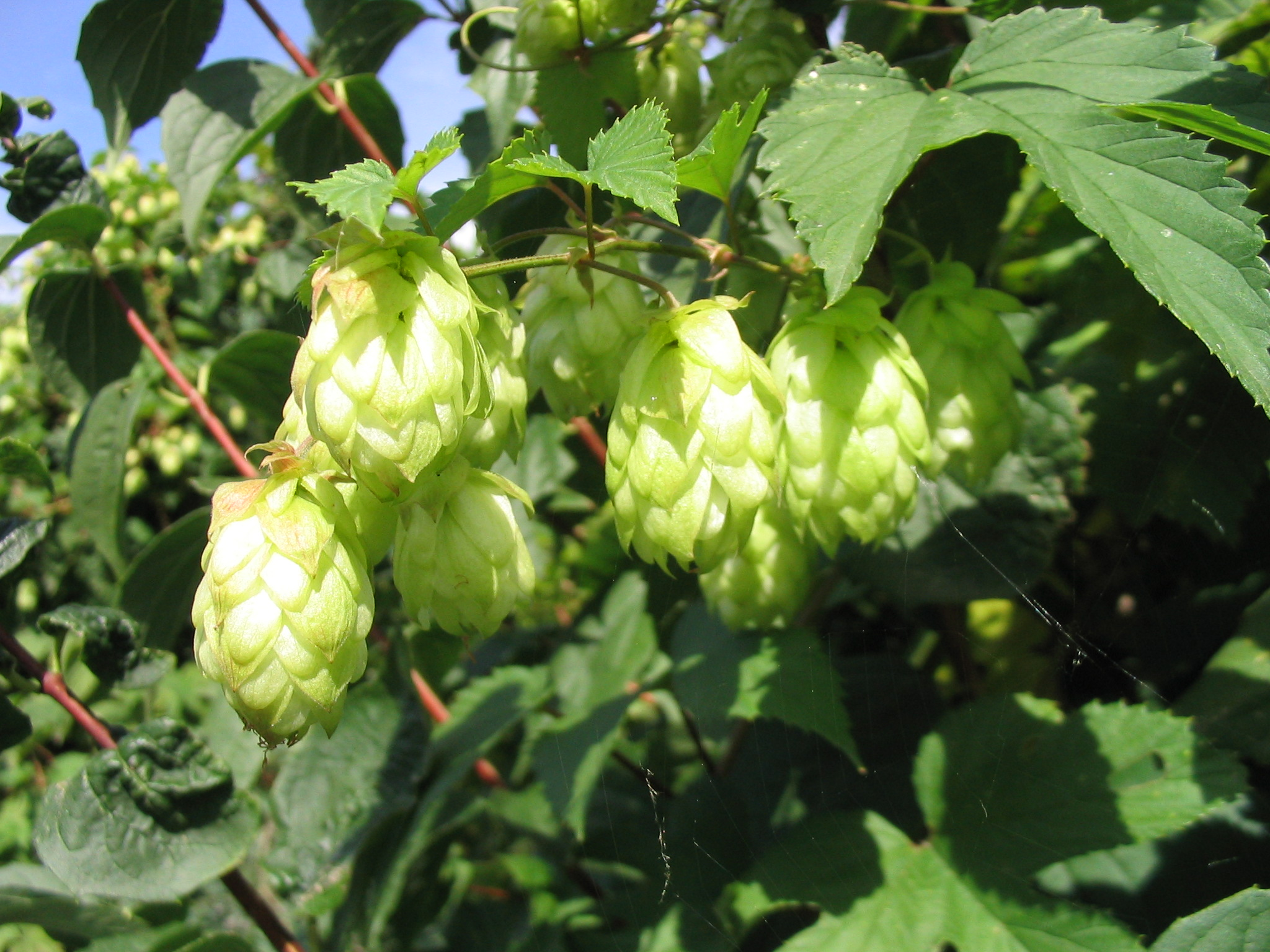
Common hop, Humulus lupulus

There are at least 7 members of the order Urticales found in Montana. Some of these species are exotics (not native to Montana).

== Cannabis ==
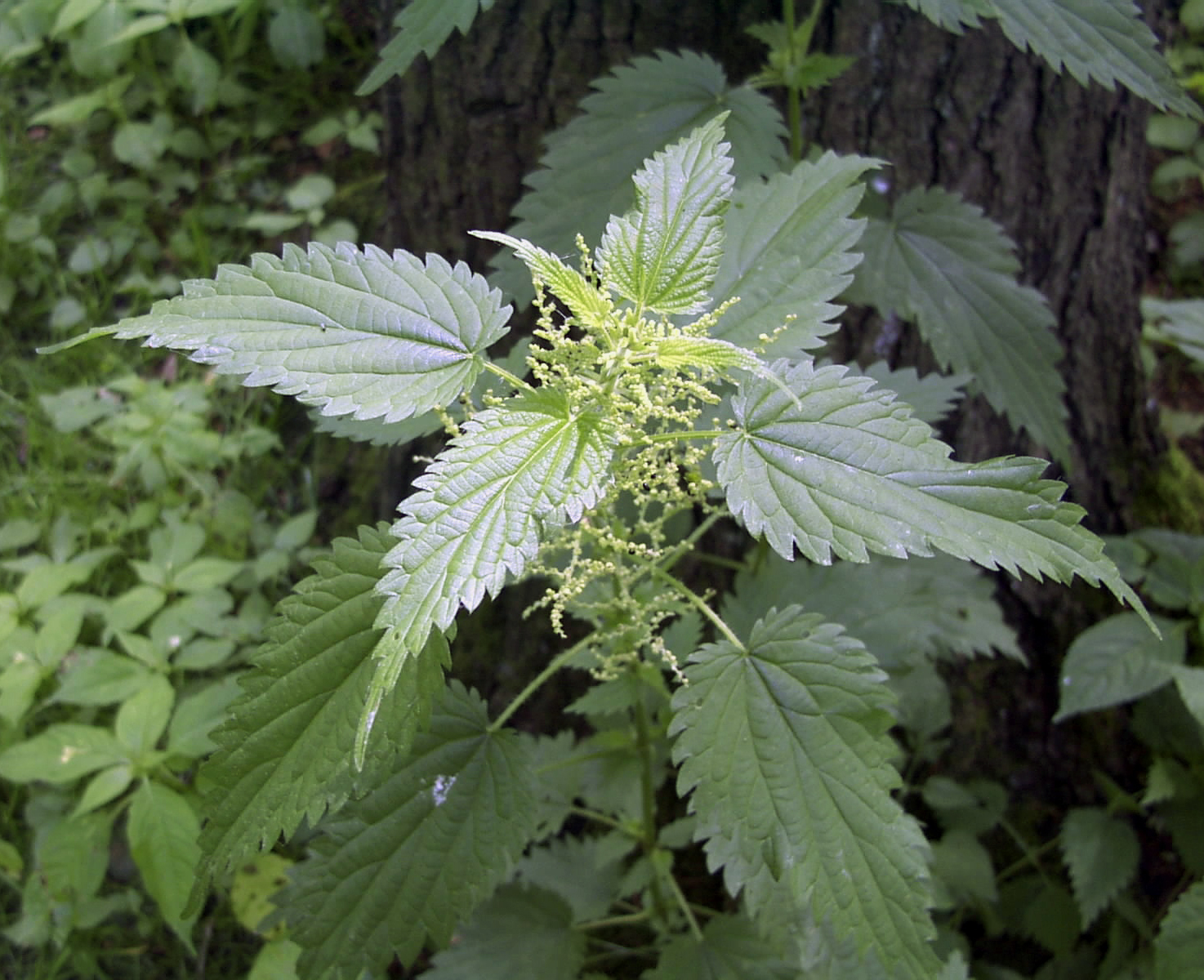
Stinging nettle, Urtica dioica

Family: Cannabaceae

- Humulus lupulus, common hop
- Cannabis sativa, marijuana

== Elm ==
Family: Ulmaceae

- Celtis occidentalis, common hackberry
- Ulmus americana, American elm
- Ulmus pumila, Siberian elm

== Stinging nettles ==
Family: Urticaceae

- Parietaria pensylvanica, Pennsylvania pellitory
- Urtica dioica, stinging nettle

== See also ==
- List of dicotyledons of Montana
