= List of Papaverales of Montana =

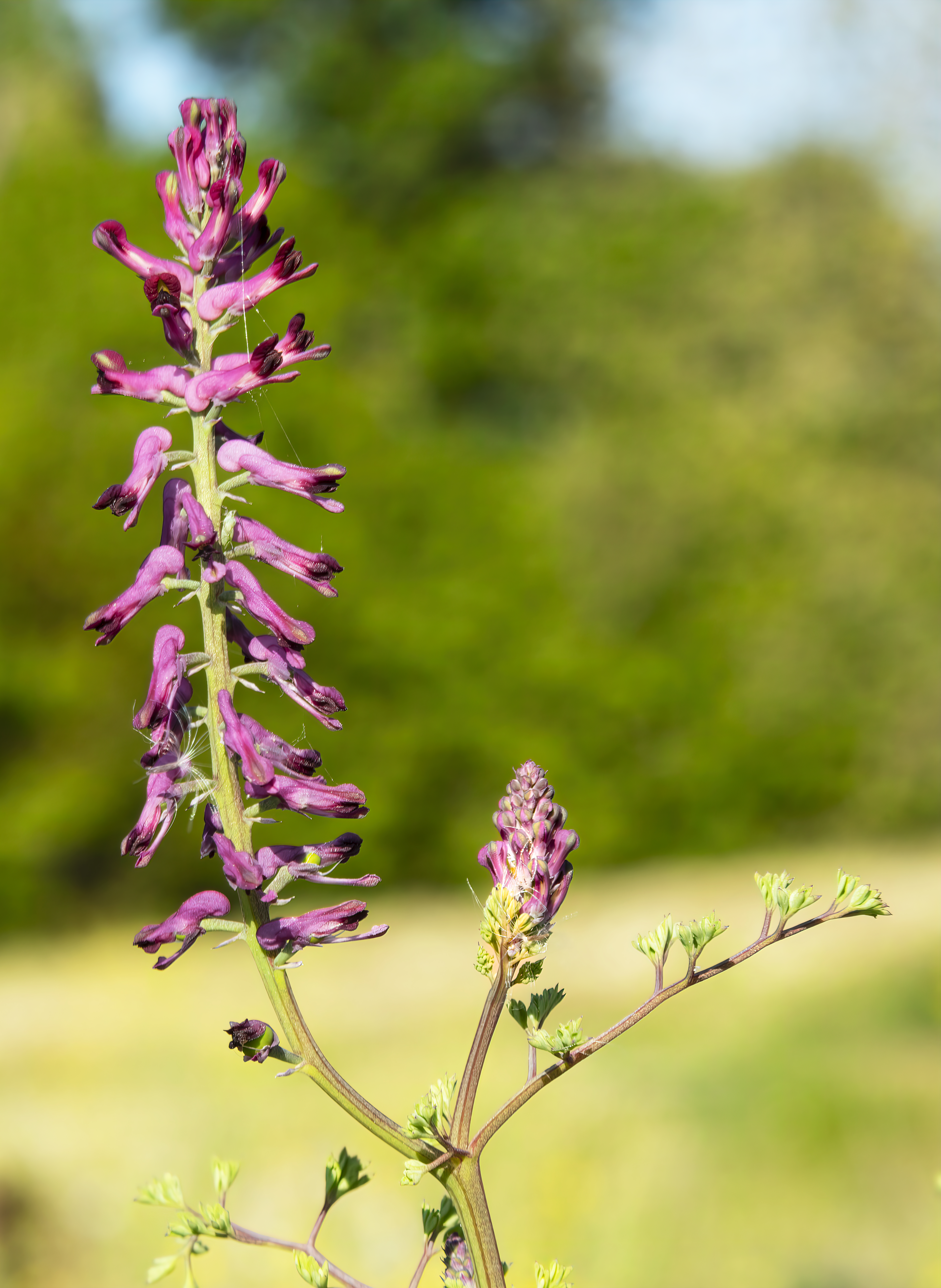
Drug fumitory, Fumaria officinalis

There are at least 13 members of the fumitory and poppy order, Papaverales, found in Montana. Some of these species are exotics (not native to Montana) and some species have been designated as Species of Concern.

== Fumary ==
Family: Fumariaceae

- Corydalis aurea, golden corydalis
- Corydalis sempervirens, pale corydalis
- Dicentra uniflora, steer's-head
- Fumaria officinalis, drug fumitory
- Fumaria vaillantii, earthsmoke

== Poppy ==
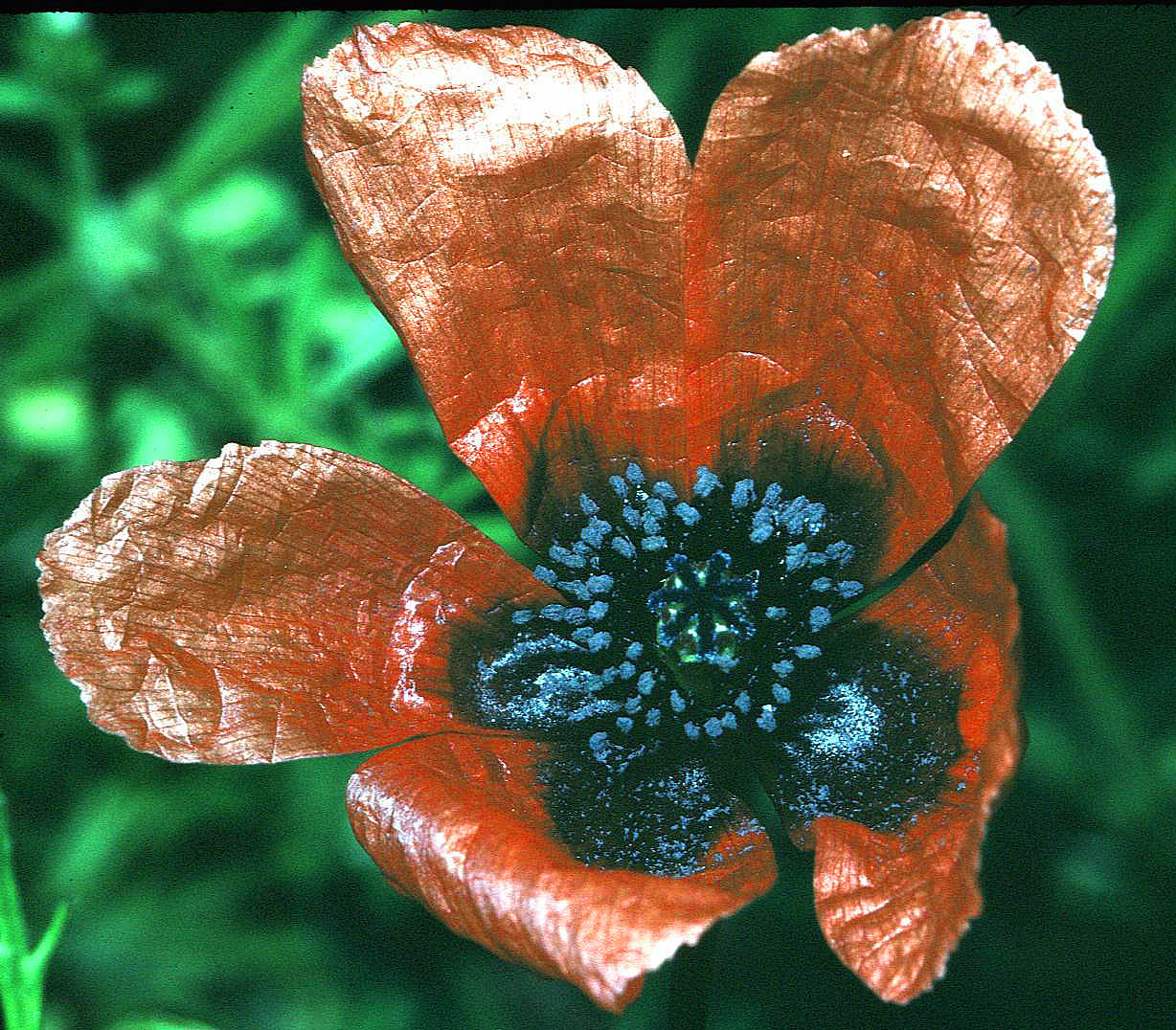
Pale rough-fruit poppy, Papaver argemone

Family: Papaveraceae

- Argemone polyanthemos, white prickly-poppy
- Chelidonium majus, celandine
- Glaucium corniculatum, blackspot hornpoppy
- Papaver argemone, pale rough-fruit poppy
- Papaver pygmaeum, alpine glacier poppy
- Papaver radicatum ssp. kluanensis, alpine poppy
- Papaver rhoeas, corn poppy
- Papaver somniferum, opium poppy

== See also ==
- List of dicotyledons of Montana
