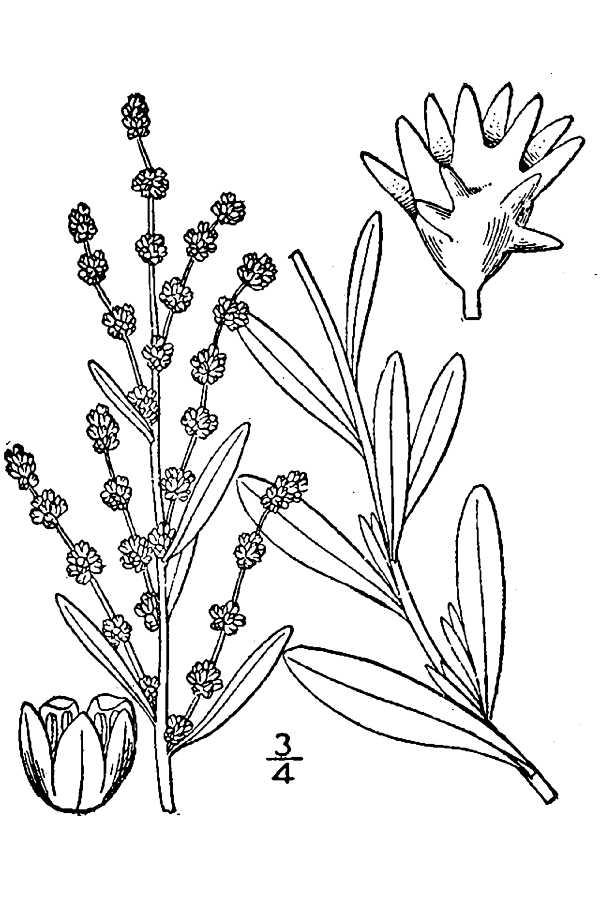

Conservation status
- Secure (NatureServe)

Scientific classification
- Kingdom: Plantae
- Clade: Tracheophytes
- Clade: Angiosperms
- Clade: Eudicots
- Order: Caryophyllales
- Family: Amaranthaceae
- Genus: Atriplex
- Species: A. nuttallii

Binomial name
- Atriplex nuttallii S.Watson

= Atriplex nuttallii =

Species of flowering plant

Atriplex nuttallii, also known as Nuttall's saltbush, is native to central and western North America. It has been treated by some botanists as a synonym of Atriplex canescens.

== Distribution ==
The species is mainly found from south of Washington to northwestern California; east to Saskatchewan and the Dakotas; south through Wyoming and Colorado to New Mexico and Arizona; and north to Nevada. It has been spotted in southern California, as well.

=== Habitat and ecology ===
The plant adopts to grow better in light and medium soils, demands well-drained soil and can grow in nutritionally poor soil. The plant prefers acid, neutral and basic (alkaline) soils. It cannot grow in the shade. It demands dry or moist soil. It can allow up to 13,000 ppm soluble salts and it is usually the only perennial plant that can be existed in highly saline environments. It develops in areas with 150 to 280 millimetres (5.9 to 11.0 in) of annual precipitation.

== Description ==
Atriplex nuttallii is an evergreen shrub growing to 0.9 metres (3.0 ft). These species are low-growing, evergreen shrubs that form dense and prostrate. Prostrate branches often create adventitious roots when in contact with the soil.

Leaves are sessile, elongated, rounded at the apex, opposite on the lower portions of stems, and alternate above. The bark is smooth, absorbent, and white. Leaf blades are densely scurfy and 7 to 18 millimetres (0.28 to 0.71 in) wide.

=== Reproduction ===
Blooming occurs between March and May and fruits (utricles) ripen 6 to 10 weeks later. They usually produce low amounts of seeds, but they still make some seeds during drought. The plants are normally dioecious (each individual plant has only male or only female flowers, but normally not both) and are pollinated by wind, but some monoecious examples (possessing both male and female flowers, as separate structures) are also present.

== Uses ==
=== Food ===
It has fairly good nutritional forages for livestock and wildlife species throughout its range. Antelope, mule deer, rabbits, and mourning doves graze on it. Its leaves are an important food source during the winter because of their persistency. It is especially important for sheep because it contributes to the minimum nutritional requirement for maintenance of gestating female sheep.

=== Cultivation ===
Artificial seeding can be applied during fall because germination is near zero without cold treatment. Between 2.2 and 4.5 kilograms (4.9 and 9.9 lb) of genuine live seed/harvest are suggested for seeding rates. Seeds must be scattered in separate rows and covered with a harrow. It also must be planted close to the soil, less than 1.3 centimetres (0.51 in) deep. During the first year, seedlings come out quickly and develop vigorously. It continues to grow until the condition of moisture in the soil becomes limiting.
