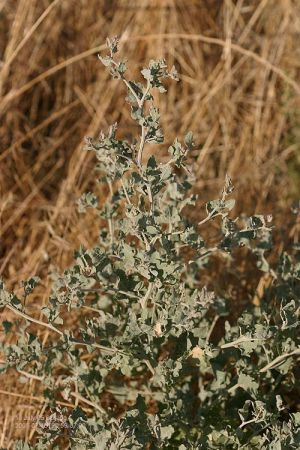

Conservation status
- Secure (NatureServe)

Scientific classification
- Kingdom: Plantae
- Clade: Tracheophytes
- Clade: Angiosperms
- Clade: Eudicots
- Order: Caryophyllales
- Family: Amaranthaceae
- Genus: Atriplex
- Species: A. argentea

Binomial name
- Atriplex argentea Nutt.

= Atriplex argentea =

Species of flowering plant

Atriplex argentea is a species of saltbush known by the common names silverscale saltbush and silver orache. It is native to western North America from southern Canada to northern Mexico, where it grows in many types of habitat, generally on saline soils.

== Description ==
Atriplex argentea is an annual herb producing branching stems which spread out low to the ground or reach erect to maximum heights approaching 80 centimeters. The leaves are triangular to roughly oval in shape and 1 to 4 centimeters long. The stems and leaves are coated in gray scales.

The inflorescences are rough clusters of tiny flowers, with male and female flowers in separate clusters.

== Uses ==
Among the Zuni people, a poultice of chewed root is applied to sores and rashes. An infusion of the root is also taken for stomachache.
