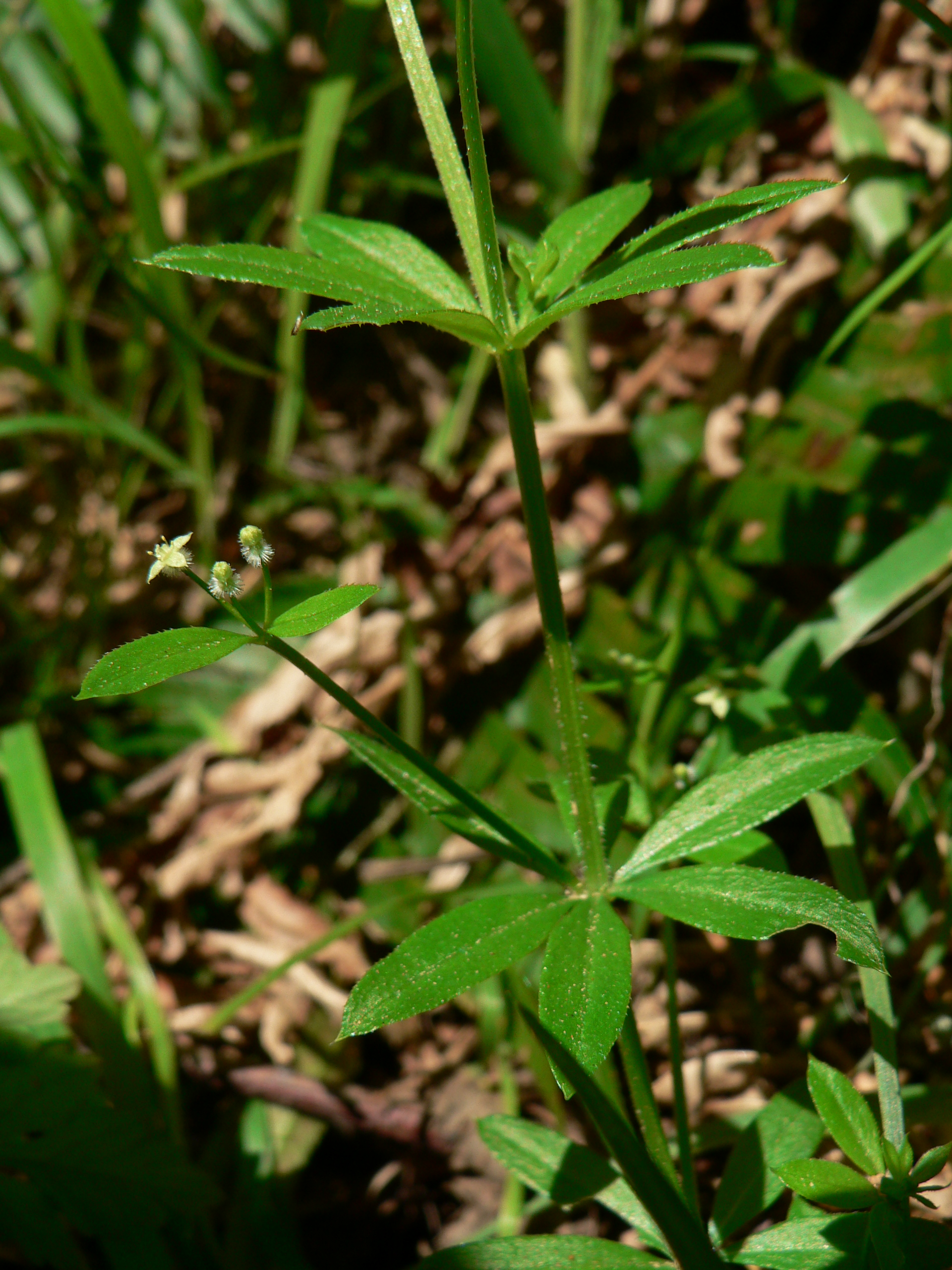

Scientific classification
- Kingdom: Plantae
- Clade: Tracheophytes
- Clade: Angiosperms
- Clade: Eudicots
- Clade: Asterids
- Order: Gentianales
- Family: Rubiaceae
- Genus: Galium
- Species: G. triflorum

Binomial name
- Galium triflorum Michx.

= Galium triflorum =

Species of plant

Galium triflorum (also known as cudweed, sweet-scented bedstraw, and fragrant bedstraw) is a herbaceous plant of the family Rubiaceae. It is widespread in northern Europe (Scandinavia, Switzerland, Russia, Baltic States), eastern Asia (Kamchatka, Japan, Korea, Guizhou, Sichuan), the Middle East and Indian subcontinent (parts of North India and Nepal), and North America (from Alaska and Greenland south to Veracruz). The plant is considered a noxious weed in New York, Pennsylvania, Vermont, New Hampshire, Connecticut and Massachusetts.

Galium triflorum grows on the forest floor, spreading vegetatively by means of stolons. It has whorled leaves and single fruiting peduncles rising above basal rosettes. There are six bracts in a whorl below the peduncle. Each peduncle has three fruiting structures, each having a single fuzzy ball. Stems are square in cross-section. The entire vine does not feel very coarse, but it is rough enough to stick to clothing.

This species is sometimes confused with Galium odoratum, a species with traditional culinary uses.
