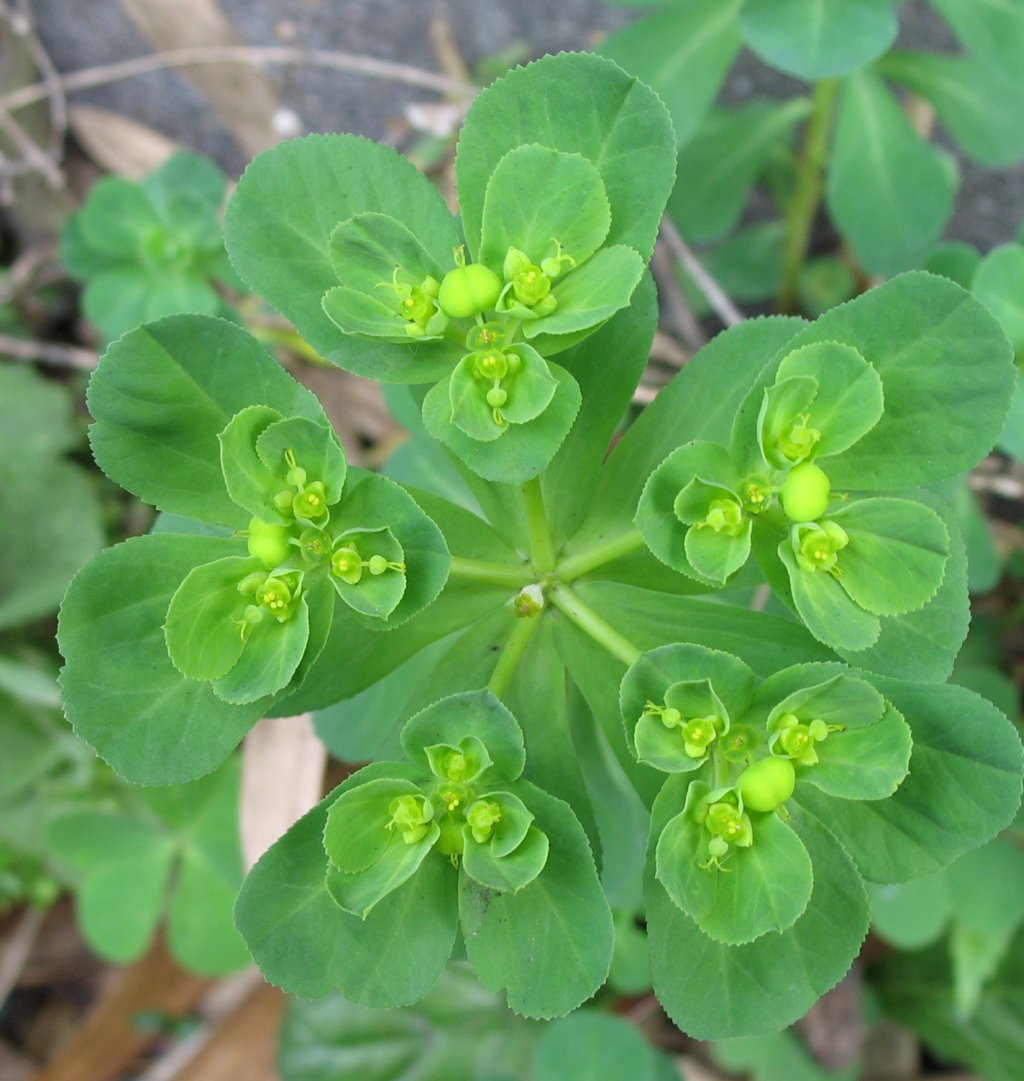
- Flowers and immature fruit

Scientific classification
- Kingdom: Plantae
- Clade: Tracheophytes
- Clade: Angiosperms
- Clade: Eudicots
- Clade: Rosids
- Order: Malpighiales
- Family: Euphorbiaceae
- Genus: Euphorbia
- Species: E. helioscopia

Binomial name
- Euphorbia helioscopia L.

= Euphorbia helioscopia =

Species of flowering plant

Euphorbia helioscopia, the sun spurge or madwoman's milk, is a species of flowering plant in the spurge family Euphorbiaceae. It is a herbaceous annual plant, native to most of Europe, northern Africa, and eastward through most of Asia.

Additional folk names include wart spurge, summer spurge, umbrella milkweed, and wolf's-milk.

== Description ==
Euphorbia helioscopia is an annual plant growing in arable land and disturbed ground. It grows to 10–50 cm tall, with a single, erect, hairless stem, branching toward the top. The leaves are oval, broadest near the tip, 1.5–3 cm long, with a finely toothed margin. The flowers are small, yellow-green, with two to five basal bracts similar to the leaves but yellower. Flowering lasts from mid-spring to late summer.

Similar species include Euphorbia rhabdotosperma, having the appearance of E. helioscopia with smaller parts and differing seed surface (Iran, North Caucasus, Transcaucasus, Turkey, Turkmenistan).

== Uses ==
Active ingredients extracted from Euphorbia helioscopia are used in pharmaceutical industry. The plant is used in Chinese traditional medicine.

Its extract has been found to inhibit hepatocellular carcinoma in vivo in mice.

== Chemistry ==
Euphorbia helioscopia contains toxic diterpenes and diterpenoids and phorbol esters. These substances are the major skin irritants found in the plant. The plant is considered poisonous when eaten raw. Nausea, allergic reactions, skin irritation, vomiting may occur after eating.

A number of tannins can be found in E. helioscopia. Helioscopinin-A shows anti-allergic and anti-asthmatic activities in guinea pigs. It is suggested that this compound exerts its activities through antagonism on leukotriene D4-induced responses.
