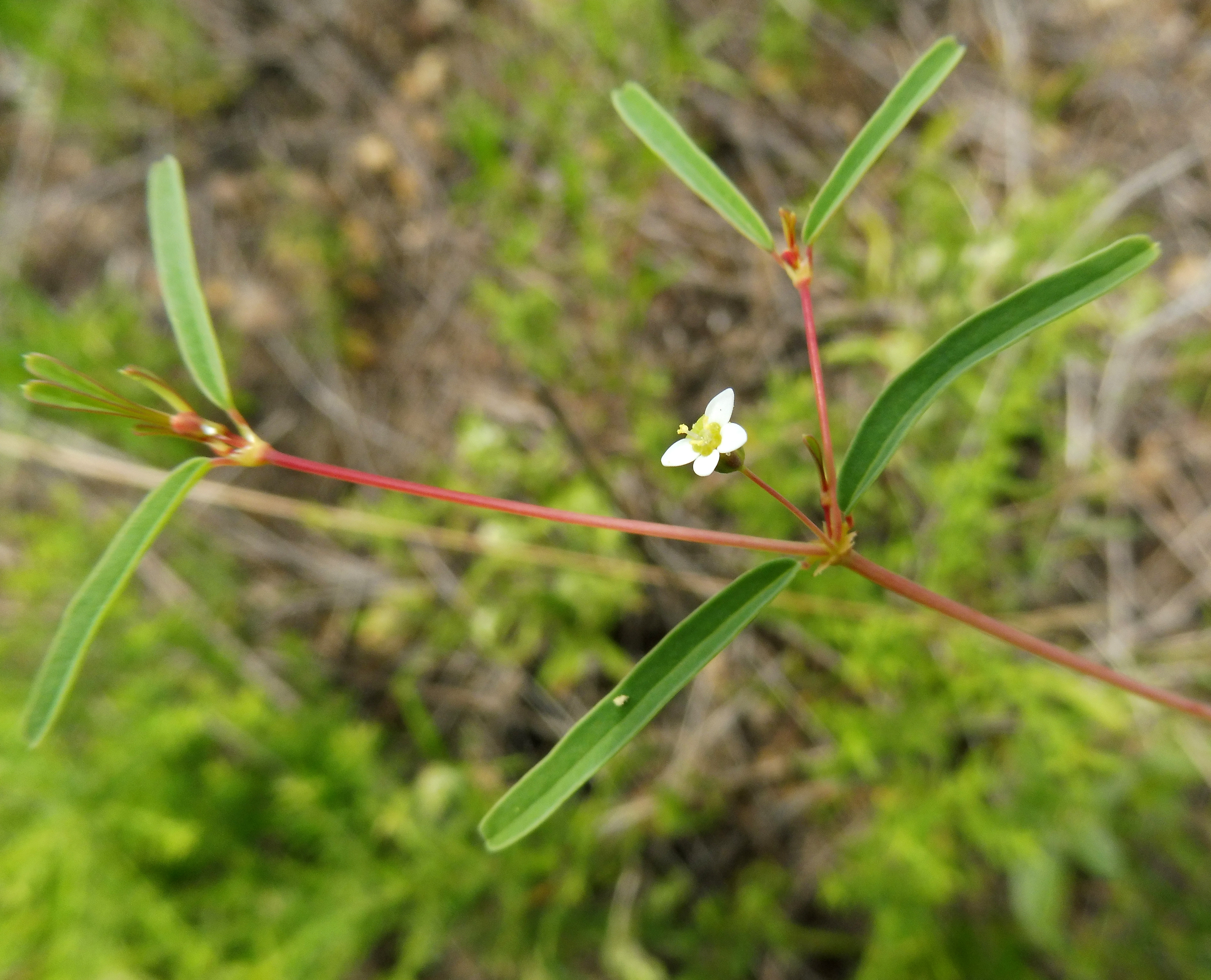

Conservation status
- Secure (NatureServe)

Scientific classification
- Kingdom: Plantae
- Clade: Tracheophytes
- Clade: Angiosperms
- Clade: Eudicots
- Clade: Rosids
- Order: Malpighiales
- Family: Euphorbiaceae
- Genus: Euphorbia
- Species: E. missurica

Binomial name
- Euphorbia missurica Raf.

Synonyms
- List: Anisophyllum arenarium Klotzsch & Garcke; Chamaesyce missurica (Raf.) Shinners; Chamaesyce missurica var. calcicola Shinners; Chamaesyce missurica var. petaloidea (Engelm.) Dorn; Chamaesyce nuttallii (Engelm.) Small; Chamaesyce petaloidea (Engelm.) Small; Chamaesyce zygophylloides (Boiss.) Small; Euphorbia arenaria Engelm. & A.Gray; Euphorbia arenaria Nutt.; Euphorbia missurica var. calcicola (Shinners) Waterf.; Euphorbia missurica var. intermedia (Engelm.) L.C.Wheeler; Euphorbia missurica var. missurica; Euphorbia missurica var. petaloidea (Engelm.) Dorn; Euphorbia nuttallii (Engelm.) Small; Euphorbia petaloidea Engelm.; Euphorbia petaloidea var. intermedia Engelm.; Euphorbia petaloidea var. nicolletii Engelm.; Euphorbia petaloidea var. nuttallii Engelm.; Euphorbia zygophylloides Boiss.; Euphorbia zygophylloides var. cymulosa Engelm. ex Boiss.; Vallaris missurica (Raf.) Raf.

= Euphorbia missurica =

Species of flowering plant

Euphorbia missurica, commonly called prairie sandmat, or Missouri spurge, is a species of flowering plant in the spurge family (Euphorbiaceae). It is native to North America, where it is found primarily in area of the Great Plains. Its natural habitat is in dry, often calcareous areas, including glades, bluffs, and open woodlands.

== Description ==
Euphorbia missurica is an annual growing from a taproot. The branching stems are most often decumbent (lying on the ground). The small flowers are in cyathia which are clustered into terminal cymes and there are petal-like appendages. Each cyathium has 29-48 male flowers and a single female flower. The ovaries and capsules are hairless. Flowering occurs in late spring and early summer.

== Habitat and distribution ==
Euphorbia missurica grows in dry, sunny, sparsely vegetated habitats. It is found growing on rocky or sandy soils in dry prairies and waste places and roadsides. Its distribution includes the US states of: AR, CO, IA, KS, MN, MO, MT, ND, NE, NM, OK, SD, TX, WY.

In Minnesota it is listed as a special concern species, where it has in the past been found in Ottertail County on sandy shorelines.
