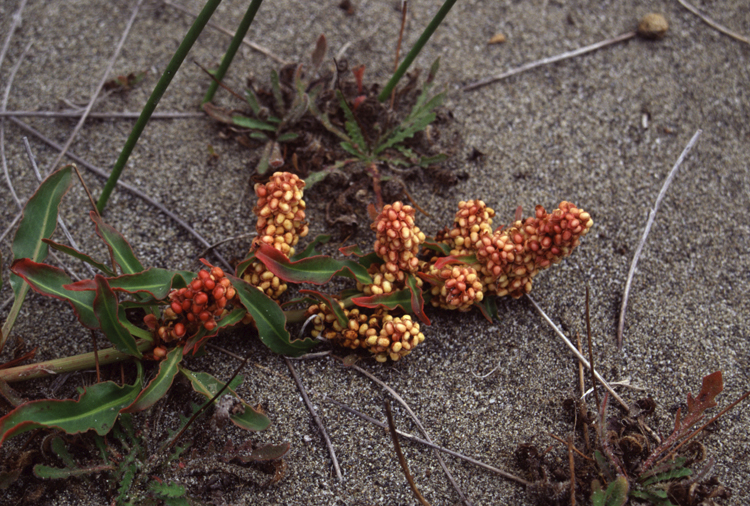
- In fruit

Scientific classification
- Kingdom: Plantae
- Clade: Tracheophytes
- Clade: Angiosperms
- Clade: Eudicots
- Order: Caryophyllales
- Family: Polygonaceae
- Genus: Rumex
- Species: R. salicifolius

Binomial name
- Rumex salicifolius Weinm.

= Rumex salicifolius =

Species of flowering plant

Rumex salicifolius is a species of flowering perennial plant in the knotweed family known by the common names willow dock and willow-leaved dock. It is native to much of western North America, and more specifically, in southern and central parts of California, and some parts of Arizona and Nevada. It can also be found in parts of Europe as an introduced species and a roadside weed. It is an extremely variable plant which is generally divided into many varieties, some of which may actually be specimens of other species.

== Description ==
In general, it is a perennial herb producing a slender stem which is prostrate and spreading or erect, growing up to about 90 centimeters in maximum length. The leaves are up to about 13 centimeters long and can be most any shape. The inflorescence of this plant is an interrupted series of clusters of flowers. There are up to 20 flowers in each cluster, and each flower hangs from a pedicel. The flower usually has six tepals, the inner three of which are largest and usually have central tubercles. It is an important food and host plant for Lycaena rubidus larvae. This plant usually is green colored with hints of pink and red. It is also a Perennial plant, meaning that this plant usually lives for 2 or more years.

== Distribution ==
Rumex salicifolius is found in different parts of California, along with being found in Arizona, Nevada, and Northern Mexico. More recently it has been found as an introduced species in parts of Europe.

== Habitat ==
Rumex salicifolius is typically found in wet places, but not flooded environments. These are areas adjacent to seasonally flooded wetlands, though. These plants can also be found on rocky slopes, and in margins. It is usually found less than 3,500 altitude. The bloom period for this plant is June through September. The plant usually thrives in full sunlight, and only sometimes in partial shade.

== Taxonomy ==
It is a dicot, meaning that the plant has 2 embryonic leaves and/or cotyledons. It is of the kingdom Plantae, the order Caryophyllales, and the buckwheat family, Polygonaceae. The genus is Rumex L.- Dock There are also fifteen different subspecies. These are- Rumex salicifolius var. angustifolius, Rumex salicifolius var. angustivalvis, Rumex salicifolius var. crassus, Rumex salicifolius var. denticulatus, Rumex salicifolius fo. ecallosus, Rumex salicifolius var. lacustris, Rumex salicifolius subsp. mexicanus, Rumex salicifolius var. mexicanus, Rumex salicifolius var. montigenitus, Rumex salicifolius subsp. salicifolius, Rumex salicifolius fo. transitorius, Rumex salicifolius var. transitorius, Rumex salicifolius subsp. triangulivalvis, Rumex salicifolius var. triangulivalvis, and Rumex salicifolius var. utahensis.

== Uses ==
The Zuni people use the mexicanus variety medicinally. A strong infusion of the root is made and given to women by their husbands to help them to become pregnant. The ground root, or an infusion of it, is taken also for sore throat, especially by sword swallowers. This species is also used in the treatment and management of chronic pain of the aboriginal people of the Canadian Boreal Forest. It is used to treat chronic migraine/headache, chronic back pain, and chronic rheumatism/arthritis. In studies it has proven to be successful in aiding people with anti-inflammation and significant pain relief.
