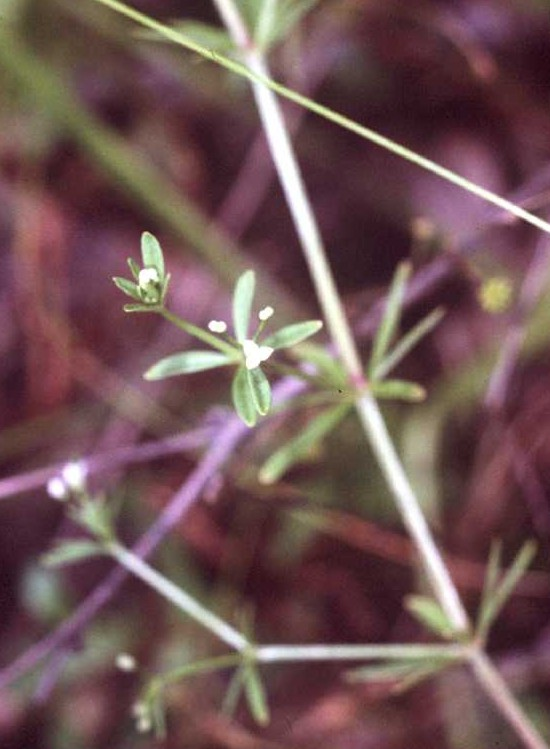

Scientific classification
- Kingdom: Plantae
- Clade: Tracheophytes
- Clade: Angiosperms
- Clade: Eudicots
- Clade: Asterids
- Order: Gentianales
- Family: Rubiaceae
- Genus: Galium
- Species: G. trifidum

Binomial name
- Galium trifidum L.

= Galium trifidum =

Threepetal bedstraw

Species of plant

Galium trifidum is a species of flowering plant in the coffee family, known by the common name three-petal bedstraw. It grows widespread in the arctic, temperate and subtropical regions of the Northern Hemisphere: northern and central Asia (Siberia, the Russian Far East, China, Korea, Japan, Kazakhstan), northern and eastern Europe (Scandinavia, France, Austria, Poland, Russia, Ukraine, Baltic states) and much of North America (from Greenland and the Aleutians as far south as Oaxaca and Hispaniola).

Galium trifidum is a usually perennial herb forming tangles of thin stems up to half a meter long, ringed with whorls of several linear to oval leaves. The inflorescence is a cluster of small white or pinkish flowers, each with usually three petal-like lobes in its corolla.

== Subspecies ==
Five subspecies are currently recognized (May 2014):

- Galium trifidum subsp. brevipes (Fernald & Wiegand) Á.Löve & D.Löve - Canada and the northern United States (Dakotas to Maine)
- Galium trifidum subsp. columbianum (Rydb.) Hultén - Russian Far East (Kamchatka, Khabarovsk, Primorye, Sakhalin), Japan, Korea, China, Taiwan, Alaska, British Columbia, Washington state, Oregon, California, Nevada, Idaho, Montana
- Galium trifidum subsp. halophilum (Fernald & Wiegand) Puff - Quebec, Newfoundland, Canadian Maritimes, Maine, Massachusetts
- Galium trifidum subsp. subbiflorum (Wiegand) Puff - Alaska, Yukon, Northwest Territories, Alberta, British Columbia, high elevations in the western United States as far south as California and New Mexico
- Galium trifidum subsp. trifidum - widespread throughout most of species range
