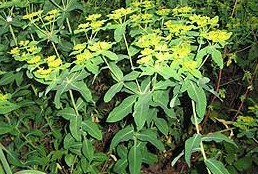

Scientific classification
- Kingdom: Plantae
- Clade: Embryophytes
- Clade: Tracheophytes
- Clade: Spermatophytes
- Clade: Angiosperms
- Clade: Eudicots
- Clade: Rosids
- Order: Malpighiales
- Family: Euphorbiaceae
- Genus: Euphorbia
- Species: E. oblongata

Binomial name
- Euphorbia oblongata Griseb.

Synonyms
- Tithymalus oblongatus (Griseb.) Soják

= Euphorbia oblongata =

Species of flowering plant in the spurge family

Euphorbia oblongata is a species of flowering plant in the family Euphorbiaceae. It is a spurge known by the common names Balkan spurge, eggleaf spurge and oblong spurge. It is native to Eurasia but can be found elsewhere as a weedy introduced species. This is a hairy perennial herb growing to maximum heights of just over 0.5 metres (1 ft 8 in). It has oval-shaped or narrow leaves with finely toothed edges which are 4 to 6 centimetres (1.6 to 2.4 in) long. The foliage is green to yellow-green. The inflorescences hold tiny glandular flowers. The fruit is a spherical capsule about half a centimetre long which contains smooth brown seeds.
