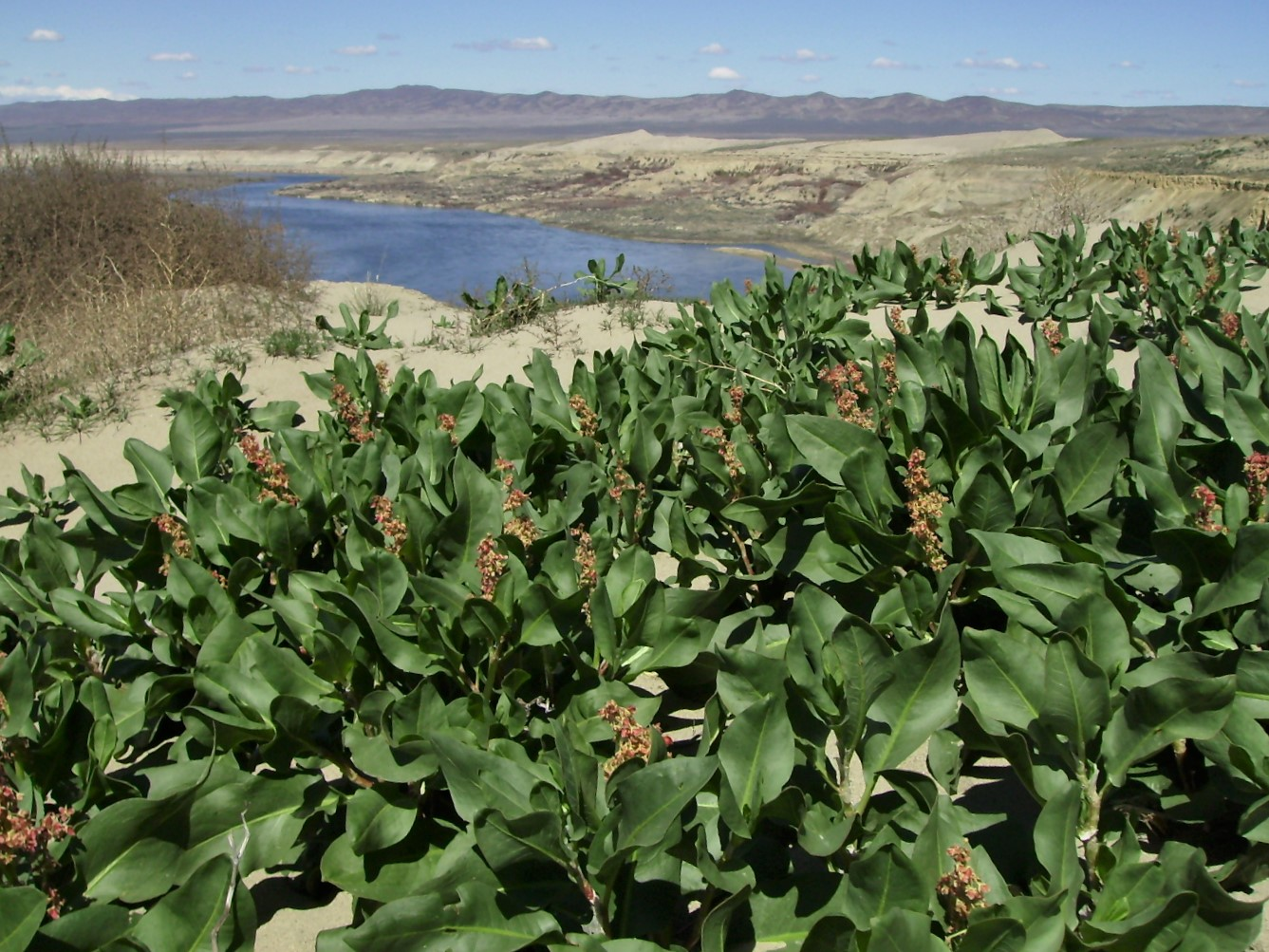

Scientific classification
- Kingdom: Plantae
- Clade: Tracheophytes
- Clade: Angiosperms
- Clade: Eudicots
- Order: Caryophyllales
- Family: Polygonaceae
- Genus: Rumex
- Species: R. venosus

Binomial name
- Rumex venosus Pursh

= Rumex venosus =

Species of flowering plant

Rumex venosus is a species of flowering plant in the knotweed family known by the common names veiny dock, winged dock, sand dock, and wild-begonia (though it is not related to the genus Begonia). While not of any particular agricultural use, its cousins rhubarb and buckwheat are. It is native to central and western North America, from southern parts of the Canadian prairies, through to Mexico.

It can be found in many types of habitat, including sagebrush, dunes, and other sandy areas. It is commonly found in heavily grazed pastures as livestock tend to avoid it, allowing veiny dock to spread uninhibited. It is a common food plant of the ruddy copper butterfly.

== Description ==
It is a perennial herb producing decumbent, spreading, or upright stem 4 to 20 centimetres (1 1/2 to 8 in) tall, usually with a few branches. It grows from a creeping rhizome. The light green leaves are veiny (lending the species its name), lance-shaped to oval with smooth or wrinkled edges, and grow 2–15 cm (3/4–6 in) long and 1–5 cm (1/2–2 in) wide. Each leaf has a papery, sheath-like stipule above it. The inflorescence grows as either an axillary or terminal panicle and is densely flowered. The flowers themselves are not showy, being green and inconspicuous. They have 6 reddish sepals, 6 stamen, and 1 pistil. The bright, pink colour of the flowers comes from the inner sepals of each flower when the fruit matures. The sepals enlarge to about 3 mm (1/8 in) long and 1.5 cm across, turning quite veiny, and surround the achene. The plant flowers from mid-spring to mid-summer.

== Uses ==
Like all docks, Rumex venosus is considered edible, but the young leaves tend to be too sour to be palatable. Since the leaves and shoots remain tender for most of the growing season, docks make good cooked vegetables, similar to beet shoots, but will likely require multiple boiling to remove some of the bitter taste. The achenes can be boiled into a mush or ground into a flour, but the process of removing the seeds from the chaff is considered too time consuming to be worth the effort. Docks contain high levels of vitamin C and beta-carotene, with Rumex crispus having the highest levels, greater than that of oranges and carrots, respectively.

The leaves have been used to relieve the burning of stinging nettle, and can be dried and used as a powder to help speed the healing of wounds. Docks contain anthraquinones, which have laxative and antibacterial properties, as well as stopping the growth of some parasites and fungi. The roots were mashed for use as a poultice. The roots can also be boiled to make red, yellow, or black dye. Native Americans made an orange dye.

== Precautions ==
Rumex venosus contains toxic oxalates which can cause vomiting, cramps, or diarrhea. While a large quantity would have to be consumed in order to experience these toxic effects, it is recommended that people with kidney problems, the elderly, or small children refrain from using docks. Calcium is known to neutralize the oxalates, making it advisable to serve the vegetable with a cream sauce.
