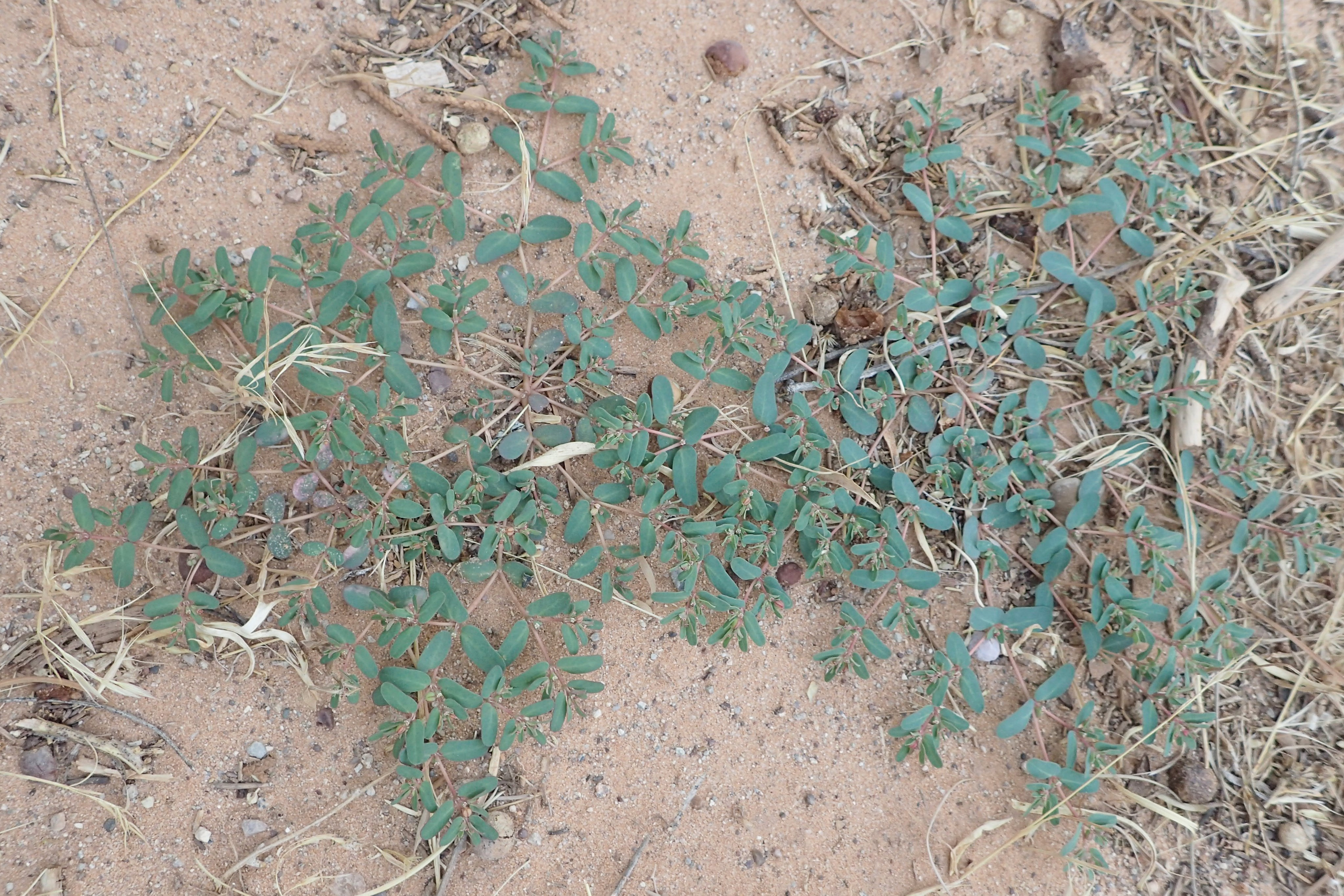

Conservation status
- Secure (NatureServe)

Scientific classification
- Kingdom: Plantae
- Clade: Tracheophytes
- Clade: Angiosperms
- Clade: Eudicots
- Clade: Rosids
- Order: Malpighiales
- Family: Euphorbiaceae
- Genus: Euphorbia
- Species: E. glyptosperma

Binomial name
- Euphorbia glyptosperma Engelm.

Synonyms
- Chamaesyce glyptosperma; Chamaesyce glyptosperma var. integrata; Chamaesyce glyptosperma var. pubescens; Euphorbia glyptosperma var. pubescens; Euphorbia glyptosperma var. tenerrima

= Euphorbia glyptosperma =

Species of plant

Euphorbia glyptosperma, commonly known as the rib-seeded sandmat, is a perennial plant species native to central and western North America.

It has been introduced into Romania and Russia.

== Taxonomy ==
In 1859 the botanist George Engelmann scientifically described a new species in the genus Euphorbia which he named Euphorbia glyptosperma. Together with its genus it is classified in the Euphorbiaceae family. Although the species has no accepted varieties it has several among its five synonyms.
