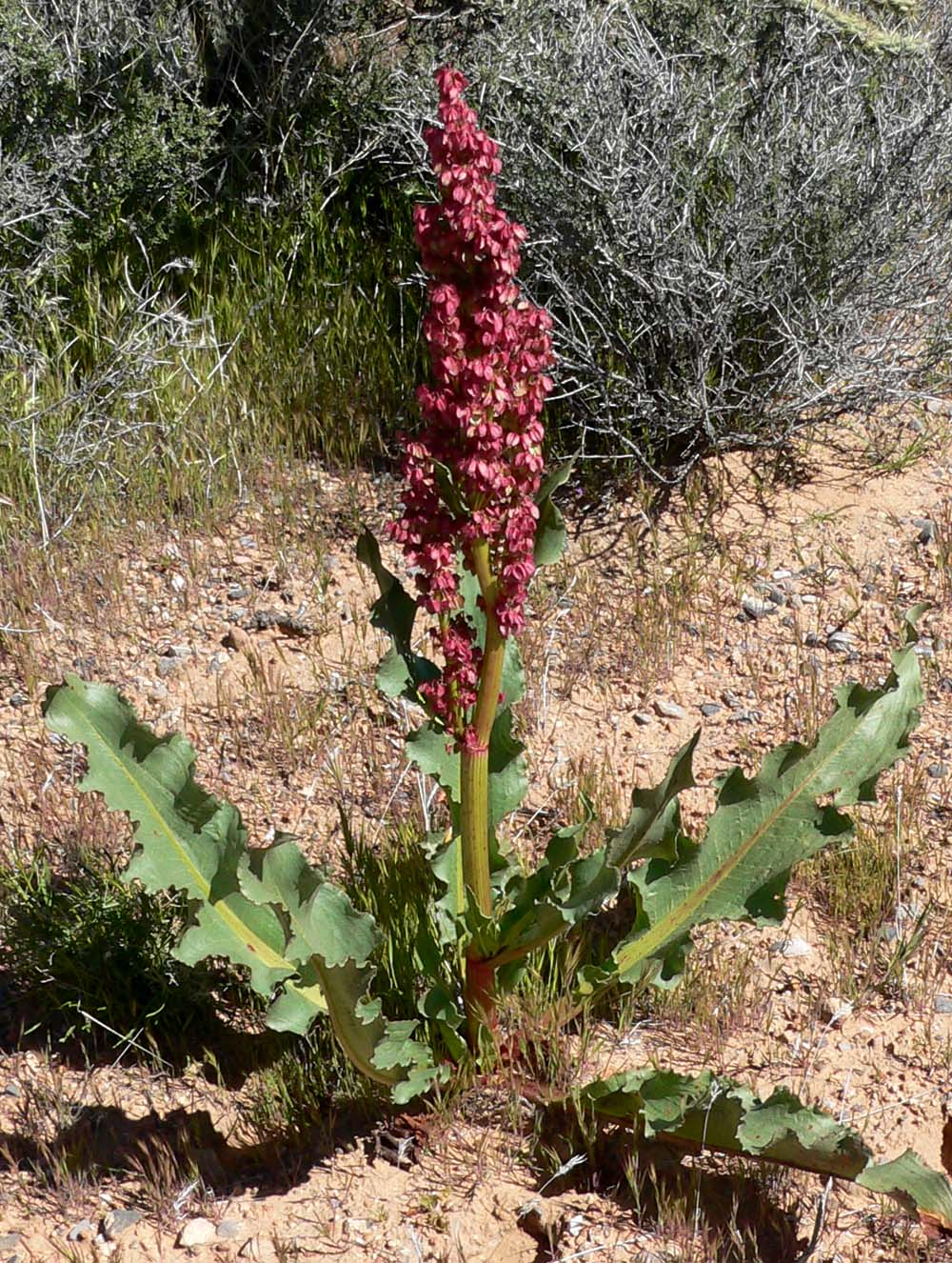

Conservation status
- Secure (NatureServe)

Scientific classification
- Kingdom: Plantae
- Clade: Tracheophytes
- Clade: Angiosperms
- Clade: Eudicots
- Order: Caryophyllales
- Family: Polygonaceae
- Genus: Rumex
- Species: R. hymenosepalus

Binomial name
- Rumex hymenosepalus Torr.

Synonyms
- Rumex arizonicus Rumex hymenosepalus var. salinus Rumex salinus Rumex saxei

= Rumex hymenosepalus =

Species of flowering plant in knotweed family

Rumex hymenosepalus, commonly known as canaigre, canaigre dock, ganagra, wild rhubarb, Arizona dock, and tanner's dock, is a perennial flowering plant which is native to the North American deserts in the southwestern United States and northern Mexico. It is a common food plant of the ruddy copper larvae.

== Uses ==
It has been cultivated in the southwestern United States for the roots, a good source of tannin, which is used in leather tanning. It also yields a warm, medium brown dye. The leaves and leaf stalks are considered edible when young, the older leaf stalks cooked and eaten like rhubarb, which is in the same plant family.

== Taxonomy ==
Rumex hymenosepalus was first described by American botanist John Torrey in the Report on the United States and Mexican Boundary in 1859.

Synonyms

- Rumex arizonicus Britton
- Rumex salinus A. Nelson
- Rumex hymenosepalus var. salinus (A. Nelson) Rech.
- Rumex saxei nom. nudum. UNAM
