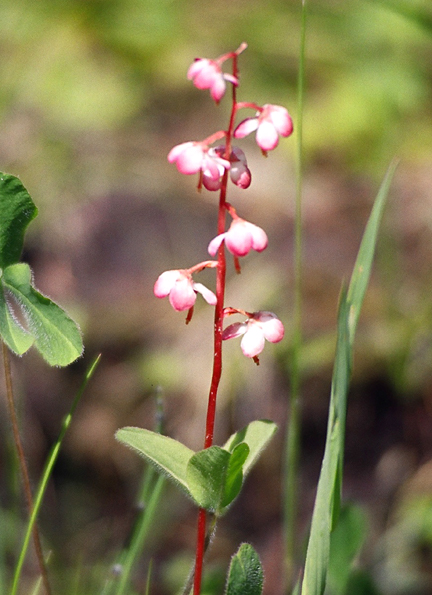
- Pyrola asarifolia

Scientific classification
- Kingdom: Plantae
- Clade: Embryophytes
- Clade: Tracheophytes
- Clade: Angiosperms
- Clade: Eudicots
- Clade: Asterids
- Order: Ericales
- Family: Ericaceae
- Subfamily: Pyroloideae; Kostel.

Type genus
- Pyrola

Genera
- Chimaphila; Moneses; Orthilia; Pyrola

= Pyroloideae =

Subfamily of flowering plants in the heather family

Pyroloideae is a subfamily of plants in the family Ericaceae. It was formerly treated as a separate family, Pyrolaceae. It has also been treated as the tribe Pyroleae within the subfamily Monotropoideae. It consists of four genera: Chimaphila containing 5 species, Pyrola containing 30 species and Moneses and Orthilia which are monotypic. They are mixotrophic, gaining nutrition from photosynthesis, but also from mycorrhizal fungi.

== Genera list ==
Image	Genus	Living species
	Chimaphila Pursh	Chimaphila japonica; Chimaphila maculata (spotted wintergreen, also called striped wintergreen, striped prince's pine or rheumatism root); Chimaphila menziesii (little prince's pine); Chimaphila monticola; Chimaphila umbellata (umbellate wintergreen, pipsissewa, or prince's pine)
	Moneses Salisb. ex Gray	Moneses uniflora, one-flowered wintergreen
	Orthilia Raf.	Orthilia secunda, one-sided-wintergreen
	Pyrola L.	Pyrola alboreticulata; Pyrola americana; Pyrola angustifolia; Pyrola asarifolia; Pyrola atropurpurea; Pyrola bracteata; Pyrola calliantha; Pyrola carpatica; Pyrola chlorantha; Pyrola chouana; Pyrola corbieri; Pyrola dahurica; Pyrola decorata; Pyrola elliptica; Pyrola forrestiana; Pyrola grandiflora; Pyrola japonica; Pyrola macrocalyx; Pyrola markonica; Pyrola mattfeldiana; Pyrola media; Pyrola minor; Pyrola monophylla; Pyrola morrisonensis; Pyrola nephrophylla; Pyrola norvegica; Pyrola picta; Pyrola pumila; Pyrola renifolia; Pyrola rotundifolia; Pyrola rugosa; Pyrola shanxiensis; Pyrola sororia; Pyrola szechuanica; Pyrola tschanbaischanica; Pyrola xinjiangensis
