= List of Ericales of Montana =

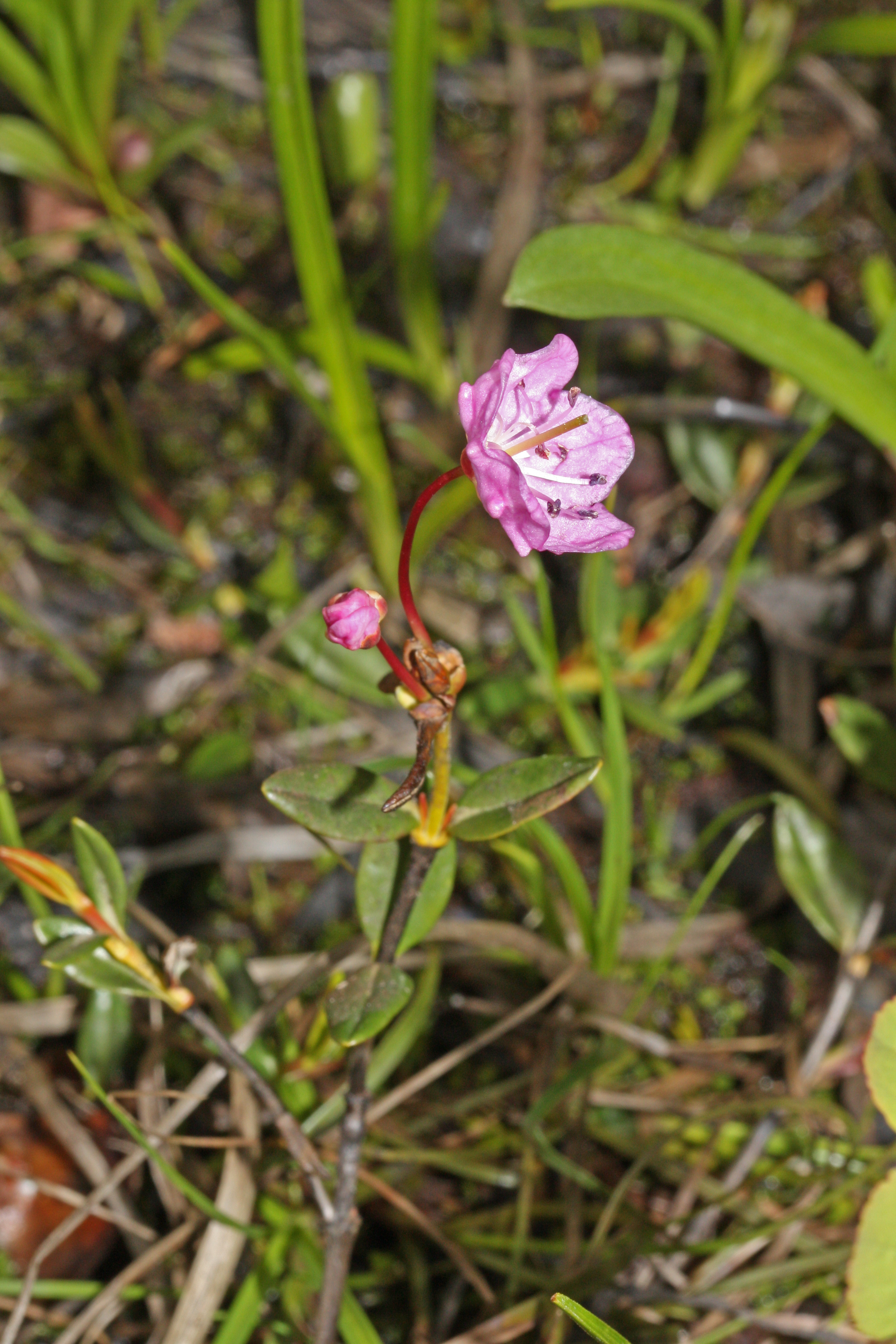
Alpine bog laurel

There are at least 33 members of the heaths, wintergreens and monotropes order, Ericales, found in Montana. Some of these species are exotics (not native to Montana) and some species have been designated as Species of Concern.

- Allotropa virgata, candystick
- Arctostaphylos patula, green-leaf manzanita
- Arctostaphylos uva-ursi, kinnikinnick
- Cassiope mertensiana, western bell-heather
- Cassiope tetragona, arctic bell-heather
- Chimaphila menziesii, little prince's pine
- Chimaphila umbellata, prince's pine
- Gaultheria humifusa, alpine spicy wintergreen
- Gaultheria ovatifolia, slender wintergreen
- Kalmia microphylla, alpine bog laurel
- Ledum glandulosum, glandular labrador-tea
- Menziesia ferruginea, false huckleberry
- Moneses uniflora, one-flower wintergreen
- Monotropa hypopithys, American pinesap
- Monotropa uniflora, indian-pipe
- Orthilia secunda, one-side wintergreen
- Phyllodoce empetriformis, pink mountain-heath
- Phyllodoce glanduliflora, yellow mountain-heath
- Phyllodoce × intermedia, hybrid mountain-heath
- Pterospora andromedea, giant pinedrops
- Pyrola asarifolia, pink wintergreen
- Pyrola chlorantha, green-flower wintergreen
- Pyrola elliptica, white wintergreen
- Pyrola minor, lesser wintergreen
- Pyrola picta, white-vein wintergreen
- Rhododendron albiflorum, white-flowered rhododendron
- Vaccinium cespitosum, dwarf huckleberry
- Vaccinium membranaceum, common huckleberry
- Vaccinium myrtilloides, velvetleaf blueberry
- Vaccinium myrtillus, bilberry
- Vaccinium ovalifolium, oval-leaf huckleberry
- Vaccinium scoparium, grouse whortleberry
- Vaccinium uliginosum, bog blueberry

== See also ==
- List of dicotyledons of Montana
