= Wintergreen (disambiguation) =

Wintergreen is a group of aromatic plants, many in the genus Gaultheria.

Wintergreen may also refer to:

== Plants ==
- Gaultheria, genus of shrubs commonly known as wintergreen
  - Gaultheria procumbens, eastern teaberry or wintergreen
  - Gaultheria humifusa, alpine wintergreen
  - Gaultheria ovatifolia, western teaberry or Oregon spicy wintergreen
- Pyrola, genus of evergreen herbs commonly known as wintergreen
  - Orthilia secunda, sidebells wintergreen, species formerly classed in genus Pyrola
- Moneses uniflora, the one-flowered wintergreen
- Chimaphila, prince's pine or wintergreen, a genus of flowering plants
  - Chimaphila maculata, striped wintergreen
- Trientalis, a genus of flowering plants known as starflowers or wintergreens

== Other uses ==
- Wintergreen (book), a book by Robert Pyle
- Wintergreen (comics), a character in the Teen Titans comic
- Wintergreen (horse), an American Thoroughbred racehorse
- Wintergreen (film), a Canadian short comedy-drama film
- Wintergreen Resort, located in Virginia, United States
- Wintergreen Studios, off-grid education centre in Ontario, Canada
- ex-PFC Wintergreen, a fictional character from Joseph Heller's novel Catch-22
- Wintergreen, a presidential candidate in the play Of Thee I Sing
- "Wintergreen", a song by That Handsome Devil from A City Dressed in Dynamite

== See also ==
- Methyl salicylate, also known as oil of wintergreen
- Evergreen, plants that remain green throughout the year
