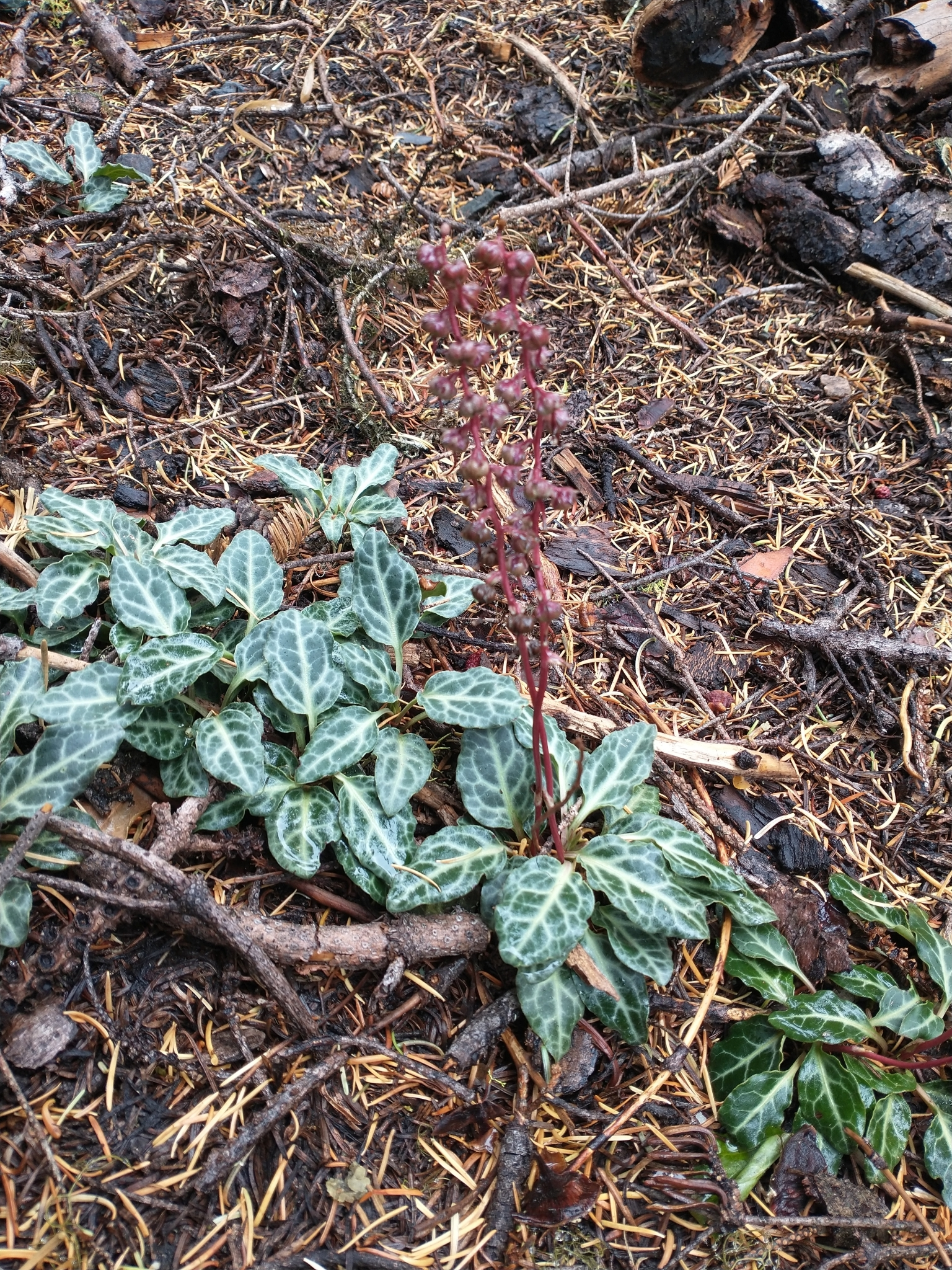

Scientific classification
- Kingdom: Plantae
- Clade: Tracheophytes
- Clade: Angiosperms
- Clade: Eudicots
- Clade: Asterids
- Order: Ericales
- Family: Ericaceae
- Genus: Pyrola
- Species: P. crypta

Binomial name
- Pyrola crypta Jolles (2014)

= Pyrola crypta =

Species of herb

Pyrola crypta, commonly known as cryptic wintergreen, is a perennial herb in the heath family.

== Description ==
Pyrola crypta resembles other members of the genus Pyrola, particularly Pyrola picta. It can be distinguished from the later by its relatively long sepals (>2 mm (0.079 in)), longer floral bracts (>4 mm (0.16 in)), and longer leaf petioles (1.7–3.9 cm (1–2 in), vs. 1.5–2 cm (1–1 in) in P. picta).

== Range ==
Pyrola crypta is endemic to western North America. It is found in Washington, Oregon, and northern California, in the Olympic Peninsula, the Cascade Range, the Klamath region, and the northern coast of California.

== Habitat ==
Pyrola crypta grows between 700 m (2,300 ft) and 2,500 m (8,200 ft) in elevation, in coniferous forests composed of Pinus, Picea, Abies, Tsuga, or Thuja.

== Ecology ==
Like other members of Pyrola, P. crypta has flowers adapted to buzz pollination, and there is some indication that P. crypta reaches anthesis later in the season than other Pyrola species from the same area.

== Etymology ==
The specific epithet, crypta, means "cryptic", referring to the fact that the species is difficult to distinguish morphologically from other members of Pyrola, particularly P. picta.

== Taxonomy ==
Pyrola crypta is a member Pyrola sect. Scotophylla Křísa, which also contains P. picta, P. dentata, and P. aphylla. These taxa together are generally recognized as forming a species complex. Relationships among these taxa are difficult to disentangle, but evidence from chloroplast genetic loci suggest P. crypta is sister to P. dentata, despite its closer morphological similarity to P. picta.
