= Mossberry =

Mossberry is a common name for several plants and may refer to:

- Empetrum nigrum, a plant with a circumboreal distribution, producing black berries
- Moneses uniflora, a plant with a cirumboreal distribution, producing dry, capsular fruits
- Cranberry, a group of plants in the genus Vaccinium that produce red edible berries
  - Vaccinium macrocarpon, a cranberry native to North America
  - Vaccinium oxycoccos, a cranberry native to Europe, Asia and North America
