= Wimberry Quarries =

Nature reserve in Gloucestershire, England

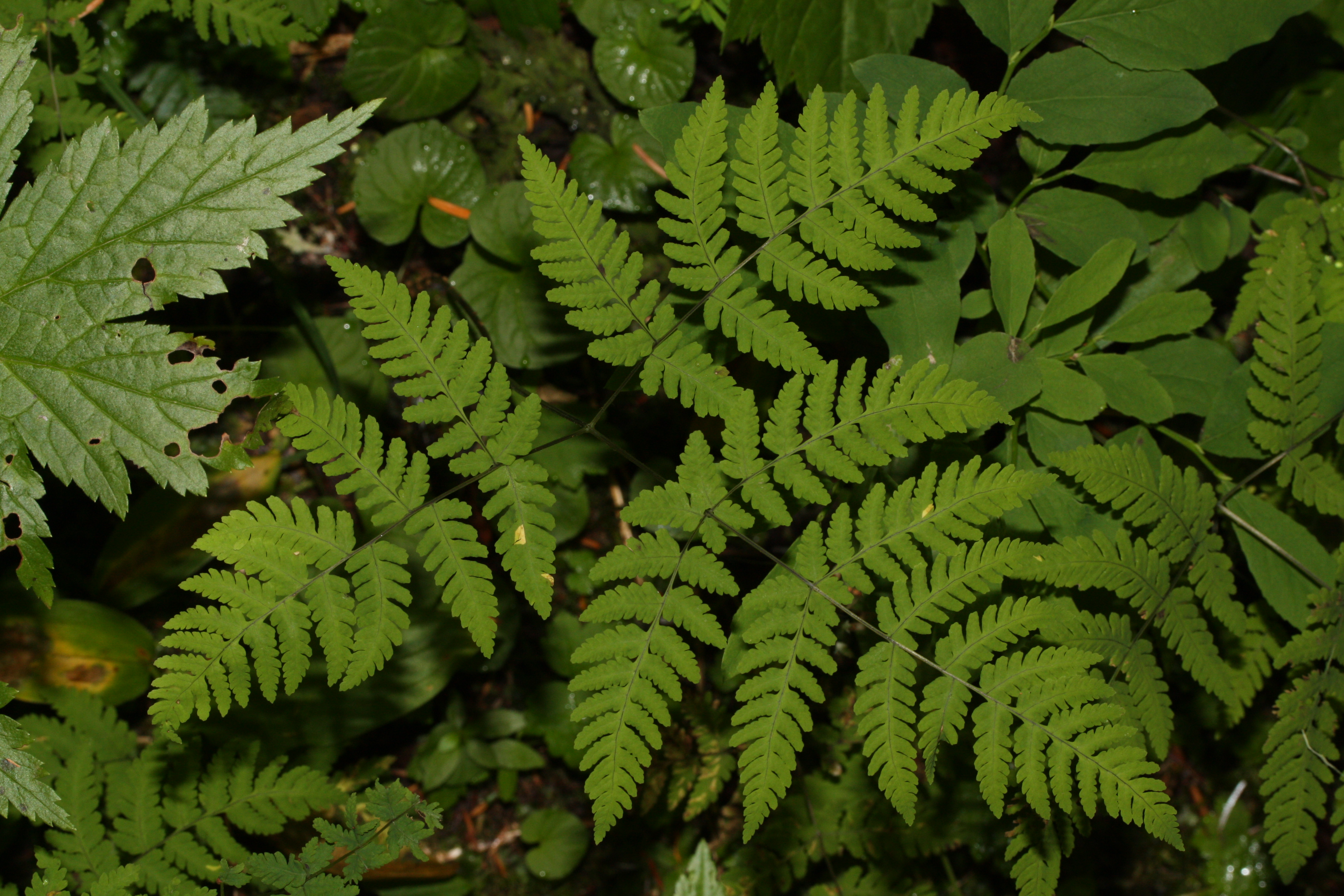
- Example - Oak-fern (Gymnocarpium dryopteris)

- Location within Gloucestershire
- Type: Gloucestershire Wildlife Trust nature reserve
- Location: near Coleford
- Coordinates: 51°48′23.48″N 2°35′22.3″W
- Area: 5 acres (2.0 ha)
- Operator: Gloucestershire Wildlife Trust
- Status: Open all year

Wimberry Quarries (grid reference SO594121) is a 2-hectare (4.9-acre) nature reserve in Gloucestershire in the Forest of Dean.

The site is held under agreement with the Forestry Commission. The site is listed in the 'Forest of Dean Local Plan Review' as a Key Wildlife Site (KWS).

== Location and site ==
The quarries are about one and a half miles to the north-east of Coleford. The name comes from the steep-sided Wimberry Slade, which is one of several dry and narrow valleys. These run east-to-west along the edge of the Cannop Valley. The reserve is on the south slope and is made up of four quarries and their spoil tips. They lie within a large area of mixed woodland. There has been conifer-planting in the area.

These are disused quarries and have been little disturbed since they were closed. There is a blocked off tunnel which would have originally been used to take stone from one of the quarries. The largest of the four quarries has a 25 m vertical rock face which exposes the Pennant Sandstone of the Dean Coal Measures. This exposure shows thin, variable coal seams.

The site is accessible from forest tracks from the Cannop Valley up Wimberry Slade or from Mile End via Perch Lodge. There is a safety fence near the edge of the quarries.

== Flora ==
The quarry floors and rock faces have been colonised by a variety of ferns, mosses and flowers. A significant fern present is Oak Fern as this is one of the few locations in the Forest of Dean where it has been recorded. The Slade is a good location for ferns and at least 10 species have been recorded. Common Wintergreen is also present and is relatively rare west of the River Severn.

There is a terrace of open heathland at the top of the quarries which is between the safety fence and the edge. This area supports Bilberry and Heather. There is a plantation of Larch and Spruce.

The natural colonisation of the quarry floors and spoil tips has created a mixed woodland area of Pedunculate Oak, Beech, Ash, Sweet Chestnut and Birch. These have spread from the mixed woodland surrounding the quarries.

== Conservation ==
Whilst the general policy is minimum interference and natural regeneration, excessive tree-growth is contained and the heathland is kept clear of scrub which would destroy it.

== Walks ==
There is a publication which details places to visit for recreation, and for observing particular wildlife in this part of the Forest of Dean.

== Publications ==
- Kelham, A, Sanderson, J, Doe, J, Edgeley-Smith, M, et al., 1979, 1990, 2002 editions, 'Nature Reserves of the Gloucestershire Trust for Nature Conservation/Gloucestershire Wildlife Trust'
- ‘Nature Reserve Guide – discover the wild Gloucestershire on your doorstep’ - 50th Anniversary, January 2011, Gloucestershire Wildlife Trust
- 'Where to see Wildlife in the Forest of Dean', January 2012, Gloucestershire Wildlife Trust
