= Rheumatism root =

Rheumatism root is a common name for several plants and may refer to:

- Apocynum cannabinum, also known as dogbane, amy root, hemp dogbane, prairie dogbane, Indian hemp, rheumatism root, or wild cotton
- Chimaphila maculata, also known as spotted wintergreen
- Jeffersonia, also known as twinleaf
