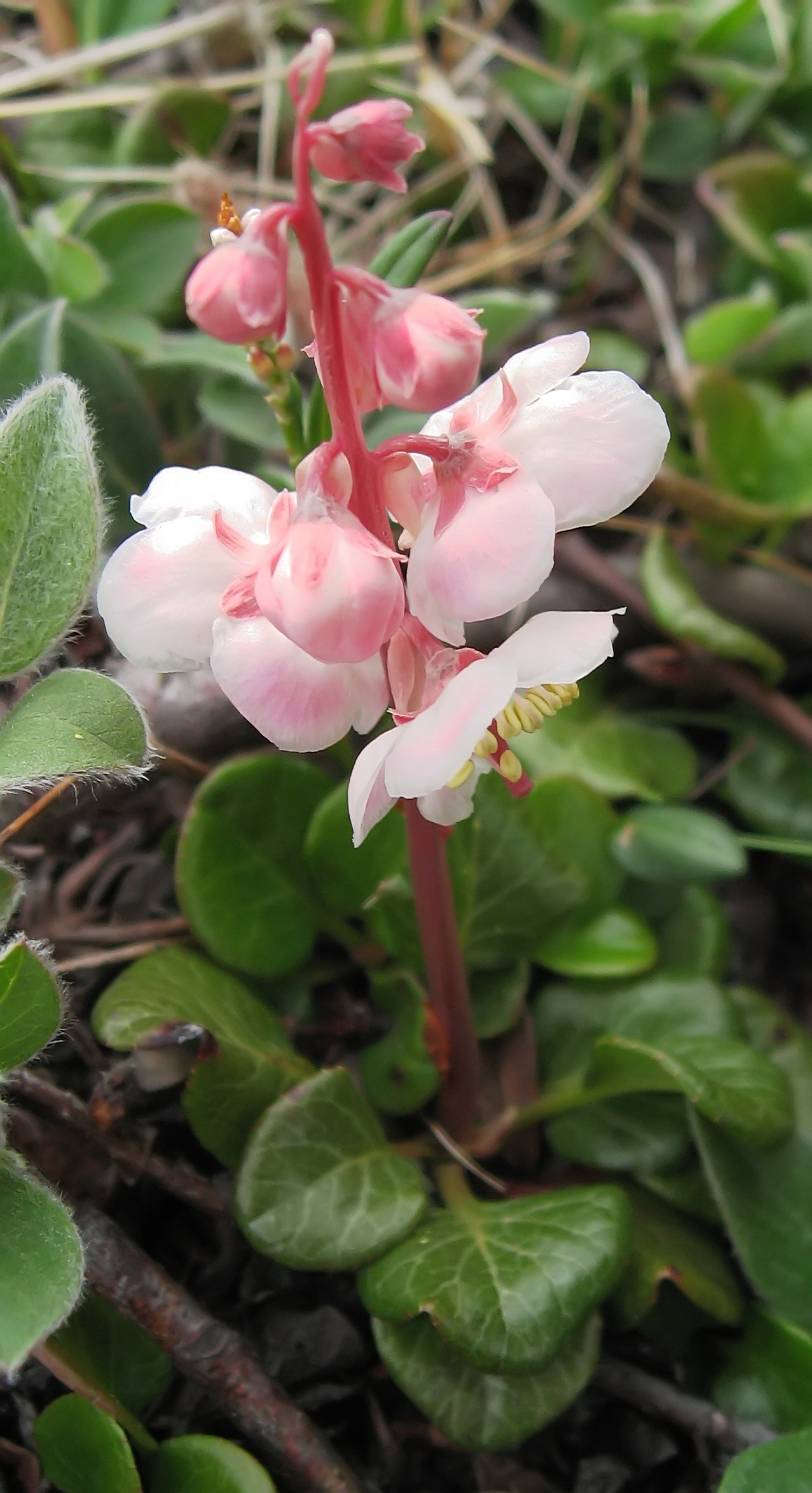

Scientific classification
- Kingdom: Plantae
- Clade: Tracheophytes
- Clade: Angiosperms
- Clade: Eudicots
- Clade: Asterids
- Order: Ericales
- Family: Ericaceae
- Genus: Pyrola
- Species: P. grandiflora

Binomial name
- Pyrola grandiflora Radius
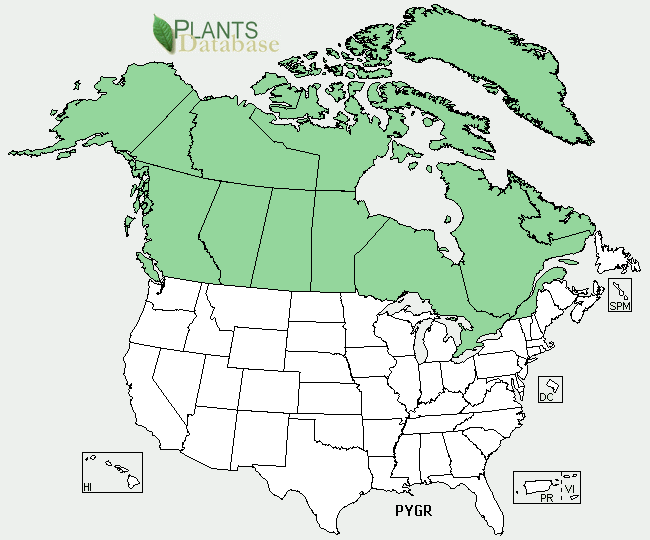
- Range of P. grandiflora in North America

= Pyrola grandiflora =

Species of flowering plant

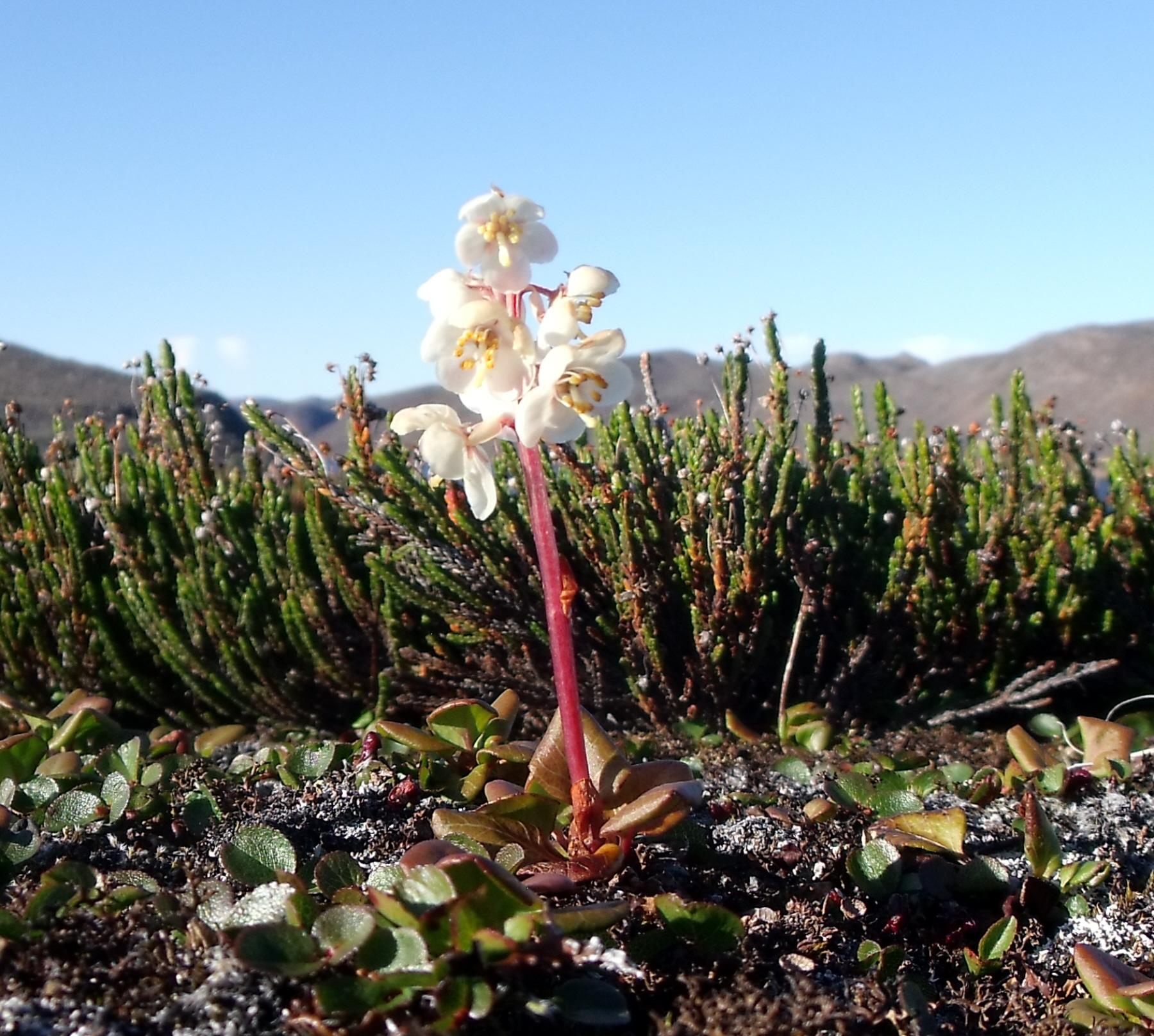
Pyrola grandiflora growing in arctic tundra, with white heather, Cassiope tetragona growing behind it. Baffin Island, 2011

Pyrola grandiflora (commonly known as Arctic wintergreen or largeflowered wintergreen, is a hardy perennial evergreen subshrub in the family Ericaceae. It is widely distributed in the Northern Hemisphere from temperate to tundra-like climates.

== Taxonomy ==
According to A. E. Porsild in 1939, there are three recognized varieties of Pyrola grandiflora that includes var. canadensis, var. gormanii, and var. grandiflora which slightly differ in terms of leaf and floral morphology, fragrance, and habitat. For example, P. canadensis Andres are found in the southern lowlands and are taller and often have smaller flowers than normal.

== Distribution ==
Pyrola grandiflora is found throughout the Northern Hemisphere and is circumpolar including places: Greenland, Canada, United States, Alaska, Yukon, Northwest Territories Islands, Continental Northwest Territories, Nunavut Islands, Continental Nunavut, Northern Quebec, Eurasia, and the Arctic.

== Habitat and ecology ==
According to the Köppen climate classification, Pyrola grandiflora grows in certain types of climates: hemiboreal, taiga, and tundra found in the North Hemisphere or circumpolar. This perennial subshrub is able to grow on numerous substrates (surface in which an organism grows) on alpine tundra, heathlands, coniferous forests, boreal forests (taiga), woodlands, slopes, ridges, dry meadows, stony places and imperfectly drained moist or dry areas. Additionally, on humus in shrubby tundra, it is able to grow along with Vaccinium uliginosum, Salix alaxensis, Betula glandulosa. Flowering season is often between April and June.

== Morphology ==
According to the United States Department of Agriculture (USDA), individuals of this species are considered to be a type of subshrub that grows under 0.5 meters never reaching one meter at maturity. The plant reaches heights of 3–25 cm with simple leaves that are basal and long-petioled.

=== Leaf morphology ===
The leaves can be described as having pinnate venation with obtuse or rounded leaf blade bases, rounded leaf apices, sub-entire blade margins, and glabrous surface. A leaf's abaxial surface is dull, pale and its adaxial surface is shiny, dark green with a leathery feeling upon touch. There is also sometimes white tissue that borders larger veins adaxially. The plant is evergreen and its leaves are persistent throughout all seasons unlike deciduous plants.

=== Stem, petioles, and roots ===
The stem known as a caudex grows in branches vertically at the ground level or underground. They are short and grow from a slender rhizome. There is a small transition zone between the roots and the basal leaves. It also is composed of a scape with one to two bracts. The petioles are 5–25 mm long, unwinged, flat, glabrous and are attached to the basal leaves or absent with bract leaves on the flowering stem. The root of the large-flowered wintergreen is a taproot.

== Flowers and fruit ==
Flowers of Pyrola grandiflora are generally large, composing of long pinkish sepals rather than broad (2–3 mm long and 1–1.5 mm wide) and white greenish white petals suffused with pink along with dark veins. It is usually described having a racemose inflorescence. Pedicels are present, glabrous containing bract leaves 4–8 mm long. Its anthers are yellow containing a long, curved style at maturity with a collar below the stigma which is an important property of this plant. The anthers consist of a creamy yellow to golden yellow thecae and yellow to yellowish brown tubules. Anther size ranges from 1.5–2 mm long. The flower has one style and one stigma per style. The number of stamens on the flowers is often twice the number of petals the flower has.

The flower has a syncarpous gynoecium (fused-carpellate ovary) with 5 carpels and has parietal placentation. Ovules are numerous and small. The small fruit is spherical and dehiscent. Its appearance is red when immature and black/brown when mature, with a glabrous surface. The fruit is 3–6 mm long and wide. A ridge down the center of each carpel can be observed containing seeds. Seeds are 0.5–0.7 mm long. The endosperm is yellowish with a smooth surface.

== Medicinal use ==
Although other species of Pyrola such as Pyrola asarifolia have been considered to treat urinary diseases, mouth and throat inflammations, postpartum swelling, hemorrhoids, and insect bites, there have been no studies found that display that Pyrola grandiflora has medicinal properties as well.
