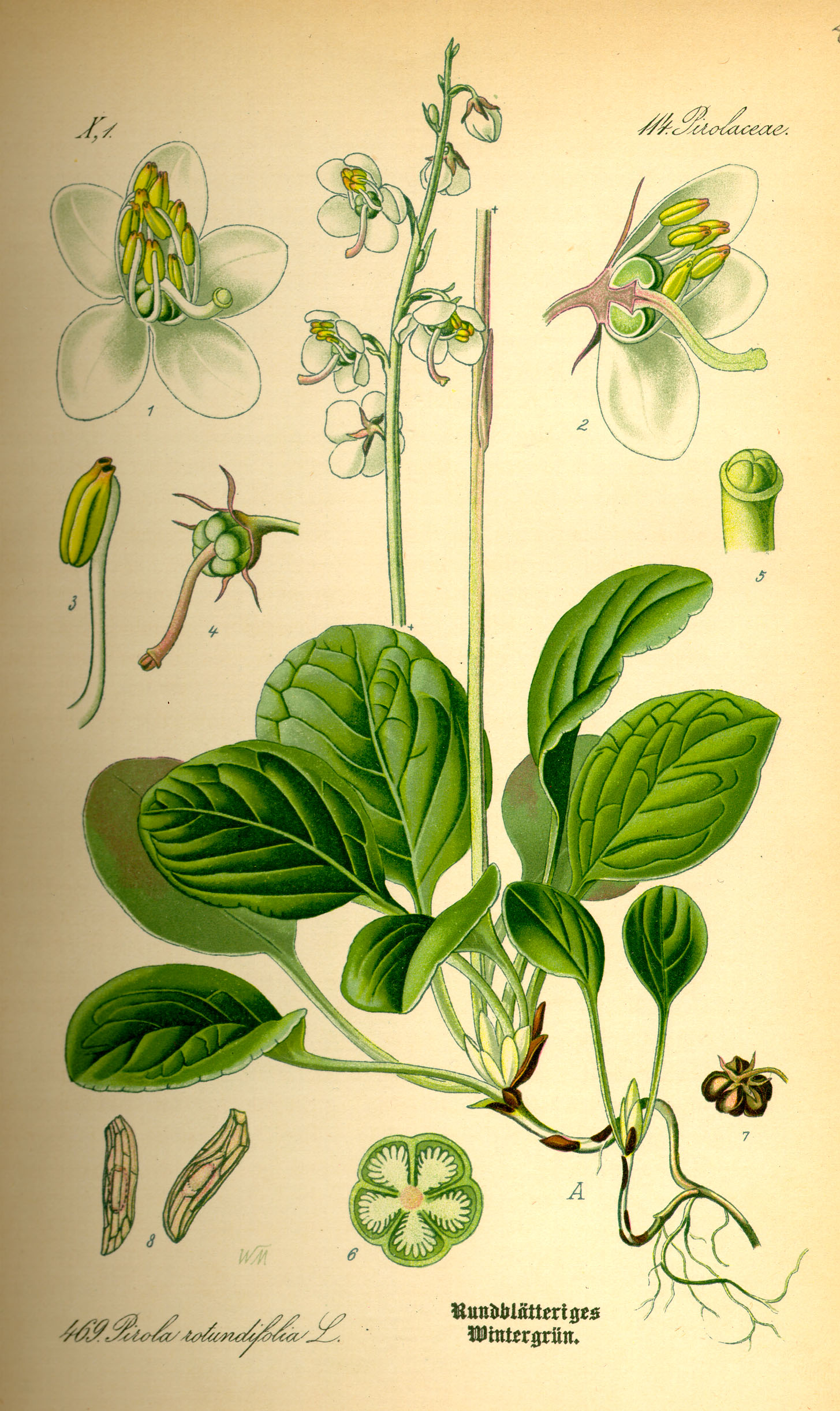

Scientific classification
- Kingdom: Plantae
- Clade: Tracheophytes
- Clade: Angiosperms
- Clade: Eudicots
- Clade: Asterids
- Order: Ericales
- Family: Ericaceae
- Genus: Pyrola
- Species: P. rotundifolia

Binomial name
- Pyrola rotundifolia L.

Synonyms
- Thelaia rotundifolia (L.) Alef.

= Pyrola rotundifolia =

Species of flowering plant

Pyrola rotundifolia, the round-leaved wintergreen, is a plant species of the genus Pyrola. It is found in Europe, Japan, Mongolia, Myanmar, Vietnam and Russia. It typically grows about a foot tall and blooms from May to August with bell-shaped, fragrant white flowers. The plant prefers moist, alkaline soils—often thriving in sandy or loamy environments such as bogs, fens, and beech woods.
