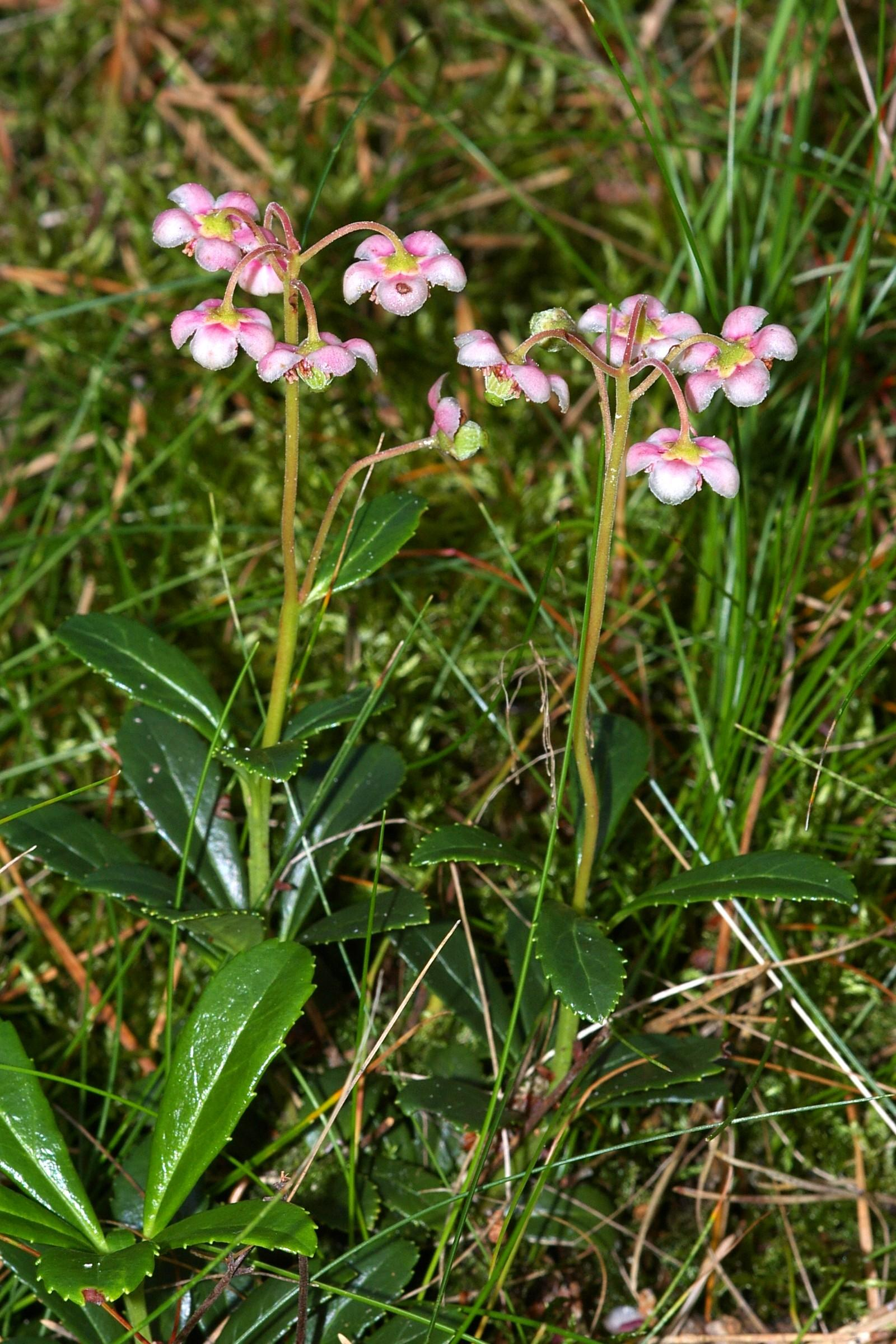

Conservation status
- Secure (NatureServe)

Scientific classification
- Kingdom: Plantae
- Clade: Tracheophytes
- Clade: Angiosperms
- Clade: Eudicots
- Clade: Asterids
- Order: Ericales
- Family: Ericaceae
- Genus: Chimaphila
- Species: C. umbellata

Binomial name
- Chimaphila umbellata (L.) Barton

= Chimaphila umbellata =

Species of flowering plant

Chimaphila umbellata, the umbellate wintergreen, pipsissewa, or prince's pine, is a small perennial flowering plant found in dry woodlands, or sandy soils. It is native throughout the cool temperate Northern Hemisphere.

== Description ==
This plant grows up to 35 cm (12 in) tall, with one simple stem bearing evergreen, shiny, toothed leaves in opposite pairs or whorls of 3-5 (and sometimes more) along the stem. Leaves have a slightly spiny serrulate margin starting close to the base, and range from 1 ½ to 2 ½ inches long (or longer) with a typically oblanceolate shape. Flowers range from white to pink, produced in a small umbel of 4–8 together. The filaments have a roundish expansion at the base, bearing hairs along the margin only. In comparison, the closely related C. menziesii bears hairs on the back of the filament's expansion as well.

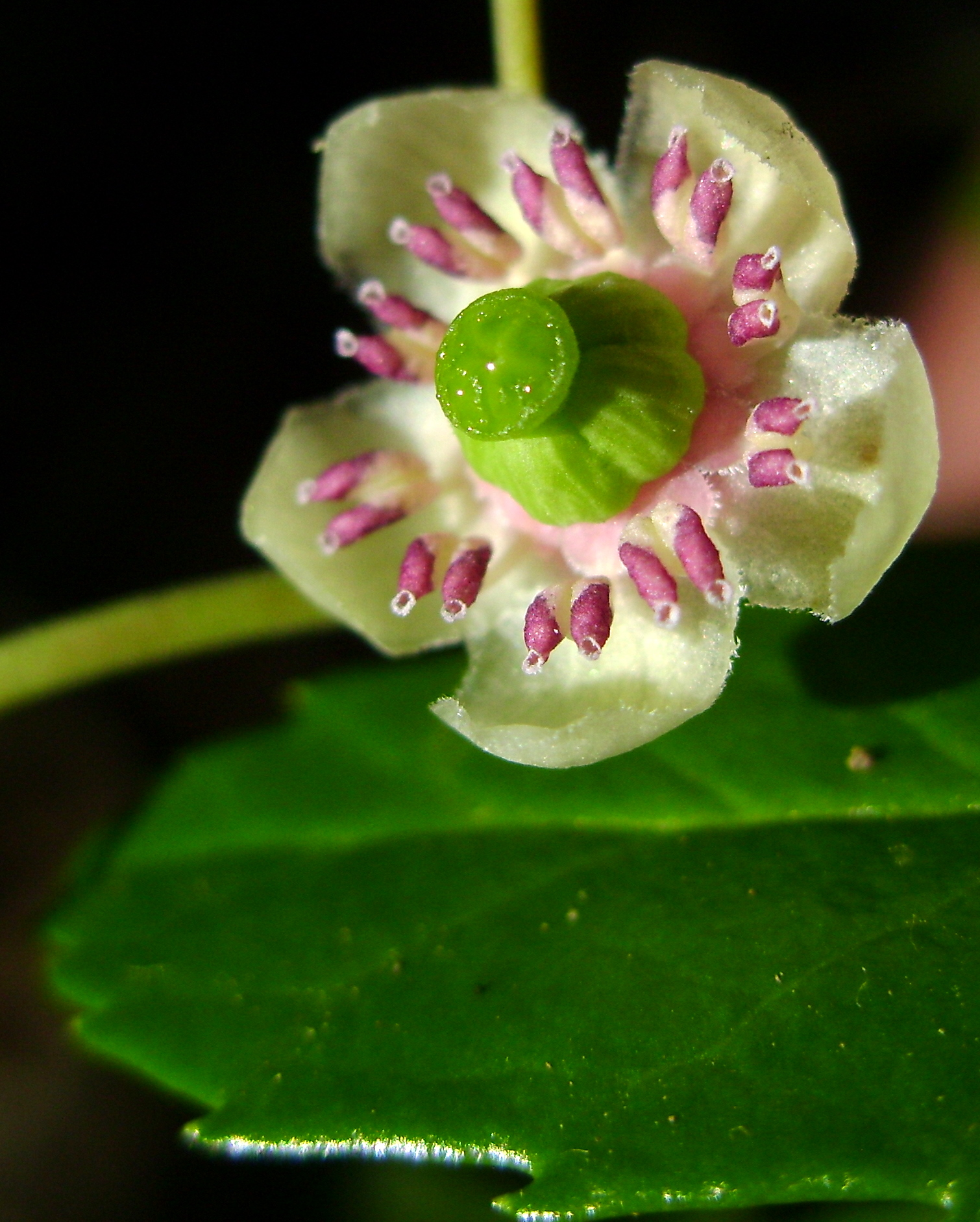
Close-up on flower

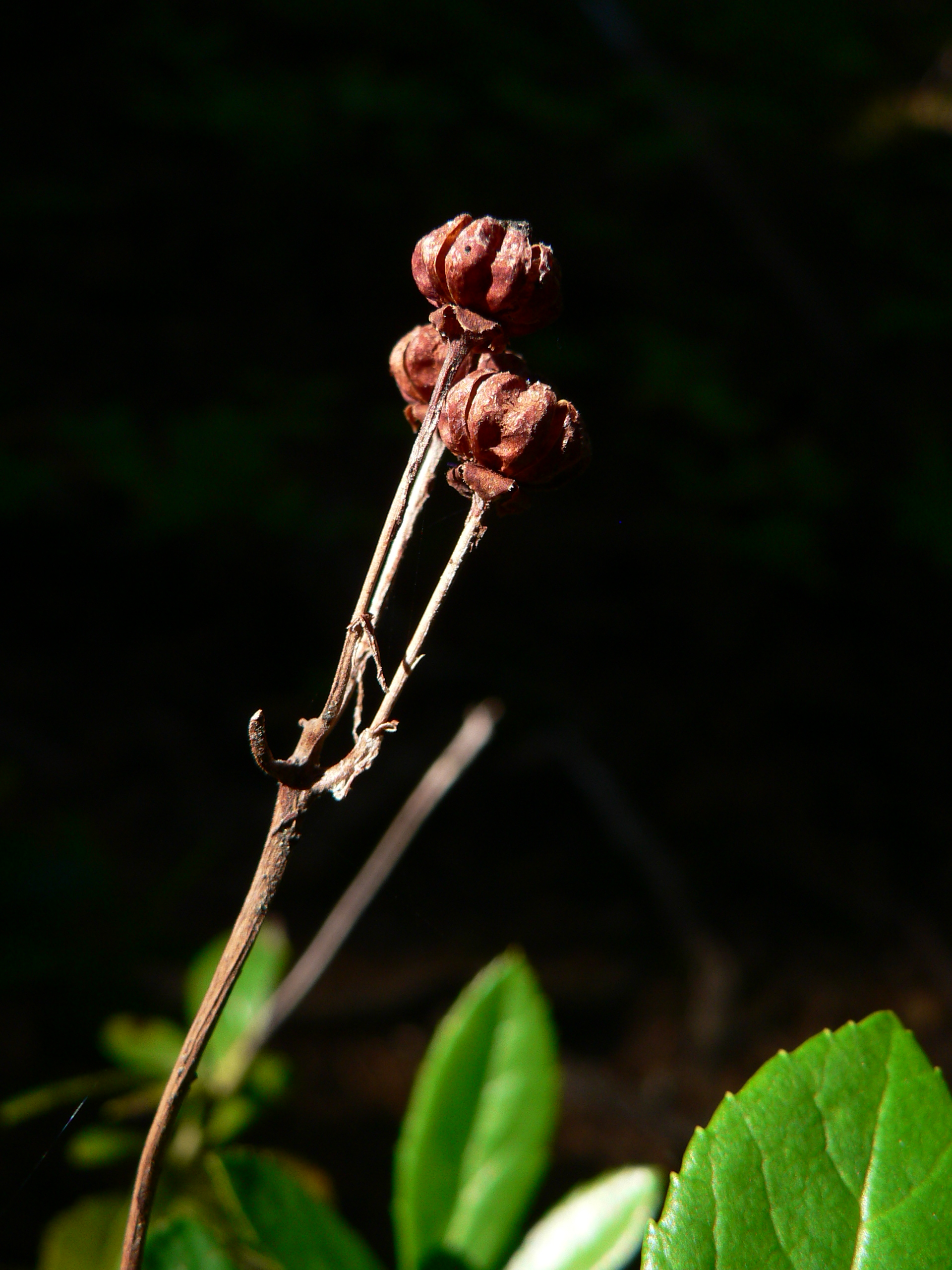
Fruit of C. umbellata subsp. occidentalis

== Ecology ==
Although it has green leaves year-round, like some related plants, such as Pyrola it receives a significant portion of its nutrition from fungi in the soil (that is, it is a partial myco-heterotroph.

== Taxonomy ==
There are four subspecies:

- Chimaphila umbellata subsp. umbellata – Europe, Asia
- Chimaphila umbellata subsp. acuta – southwestern North America
- Chimaphila umbellata subsp. cisatlantica – northeastern North America
- Chimaphila umbellata subsp. occidentalis – northwestern North America

== Uses ==
Some Plateau Indian tribes used a boil of prince's pine to treat tuberculosis.

The twentieth century Appalachian folk healer Clarence "Catfish" Gray, "Man of the Woods", credited pipsissewa with curing his own heart problems and included it in his 15 herb cure-all "bitters."

It can reportedly be used as a flavoring in candy and soft drinks, particularly root beer.

The roots and leaves of Chimaphila umbellata can be boiled to create tea.

Recent investigations show the anti-proliferative effect of Chimaphila umbellata in human breast cancer cells (MCF-7).

== Name ==
"Pipsissewa" is a Cree name meaning "It-breaks-into-small-pieces".
