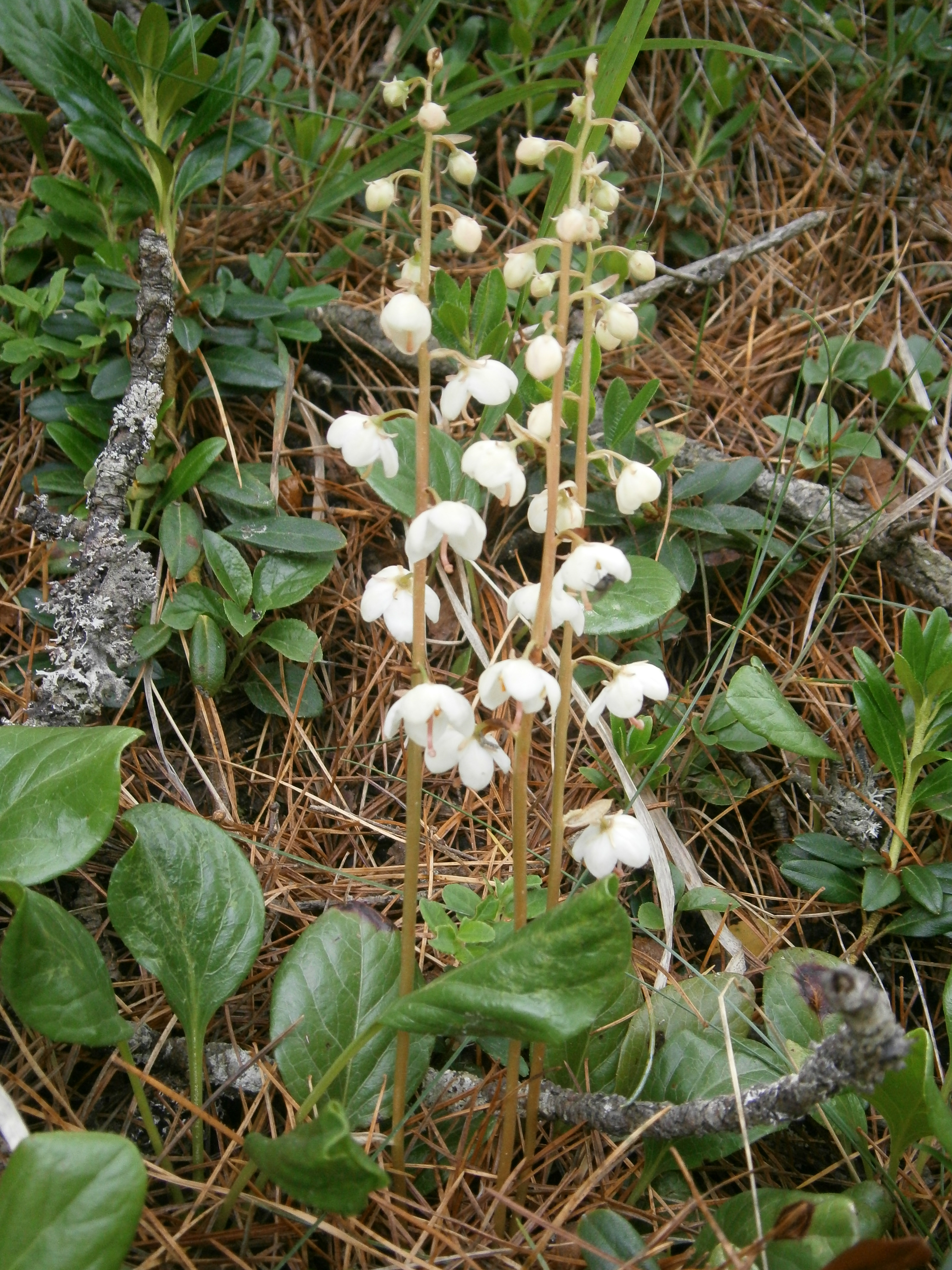

Scientific classification
- Kingdom: Plantae
- Clade: Tracheophytes
- Clade: Angiosperms
- Clade: Eudicots
- Clade: Asterids
- Order: Ericales
- Family: Ericaceae
- Genus: Pyrola
- Species: P. media

Binomial name
- Pyrola media Sw.

= Pyrola media =

Species of flowering plant

Pyrola media, the intermediate wintergreen, is a flowering plant in the genus Pyrola, native to northern and eastern Europe and Western Asia.

It is a herbaceous evergreen perennial plant with a basal rosette of leaves and a single erect flowering stem 15–30 cm tall. The leaves are round, up to 4.5 cm diameter. The flowers are white or pale pink, 7–11 mm diameter, with a straight style extending beyond the petals.

The species is rare and declining in the British Isles.
