= Pyrola dentata =

Scientific classification
- Kingdom: Plantae
- Clade: Tracheophytes
- Clade: Angiosperms
- Clade: Eudicots
- Clade: Asterids
- Order: Ericales
- Family: Ericaceae
- Genus: Pyrola
- Species: P. dentata

Binomial name
- Pyrola dentata Sm.

Species of plant

Pyrola dentata is a species of flowering plant in the family Ericaceae, with the common name toothed wintergreen.

== Description ==
The glaucous leaf blade is 2-9 cm long, round to ovate, elliptic, or oblanceolate in shape, often with a bluish tint and prominent pale veins. The leaf is usually serrate but sometimes entire, and the base generally tapers to the petiole. The leaves form a compact rosette close to the ground. The unbranched flower stalk (scape) arises from the base of the plant and is 8-27 cm tall. There may be a few to many cream colored flowers on each stalk. The stalk is usually brownish red to pink in color and the petals may have a red tinge especially on the underside.

== Range ==
Pyrola dentata ranges from British Columbia to northern Baja California, mostly in coastal ranges, the Cascade Mountains, and the Sierra Nevada, but extending eastward into the northern Rocky Mountains in Idaho, Montana, and Wyoming. It grows from near sea level to sub-alpine elevations (50 to 2900 meters).

== Habitat ==
Pyrola dentata grows in varied habitats, including mixed conifer and oak woodland, pine woodland, forested serpentine and volcanic areas, and open hillsides of decomposed granite or loose, coarse sand or gravel near rocky outcrops.
