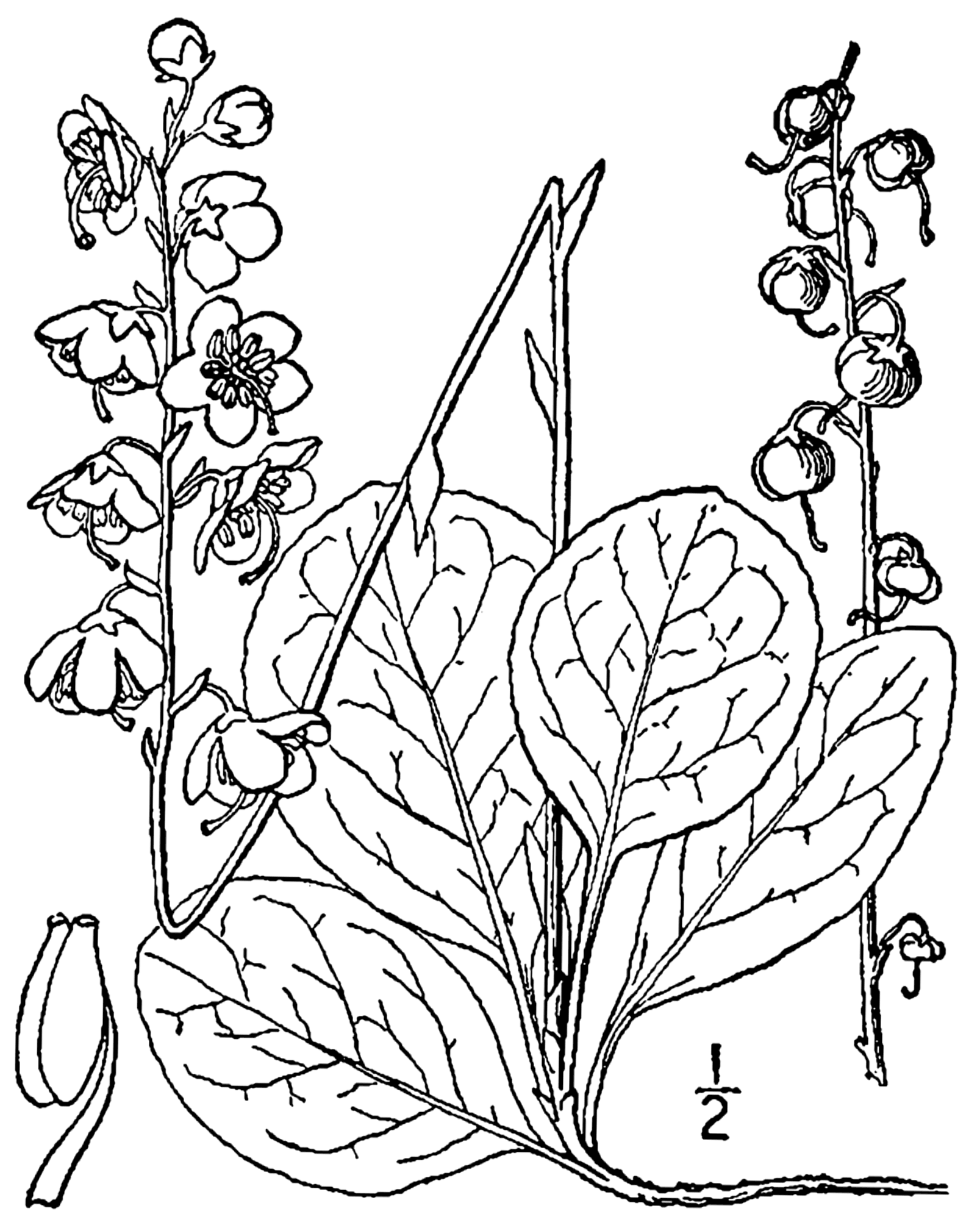
- 1913 illustration

Scientific classification
- Kingdom: Plantae
- Clade: Tracheophytes
- Clade: Angiosperms
- Clade: Eudicots
- Clade: Asterids
- Order: Ericales
- Family: Ericaceae
- Genus: Pyrola
- Species: P. americana

Binomial name
- Pyrola americana Sweet

Synonyms
- Pyrola asarifolia subsp. americana (Sweet) Křísa; Pyrola rotundifolia var. americana (Sweet) Fernald

= Pyrola americana =

American wintergreen

Species of flowering plant

Pyrola americana, the American wintergreen, is a plant species native to Canada and the United States.

== Description ==
Pyrola americana is a small herb rarely more than 4 cm tall, spreading by means of underground rhizomes. Leaves are round to egg-shaped, up to 8 cm long, usually dark green with whitish tissue along the veins. Flowers are white to pinkish. Fruit is a dry capsule about 4 mm across.

== Distribution and habitat ==
It has been reported from every Canadian province from Newfoundland to Manitoba, as well as from Saint Pierre and Miquelon plus the northeastern US from Maine south along the Appalachian Mountains to extreme northeastern Tennessee. It also occurs in all the Great Lakes states and in the Black Hills of South Dakota. It grows in moist forests up to an elevation of 2100 m.
