= Pyrola rugosa =

Scientific classification
- Kingdom: Plantae
- Clade: Embryophytes
- Clade: Tracheophytes
- Clade: Spermatophytes
- Clade: Angiosperms
- Clade: Eudicots
- Clade: Asterids
- Order: Ericales
- Family: Ericaceae
- Genus: Pyrola
- Species: P. rugosa

Binomial name
- Pyrola rugosa Andres

Species of flowering plant in the heath family

Pyrola rugosa is a species of flowering plant in the family Ericaceae, within the genus Pyrola. It is native to it is a perennial species native to Central China and primarily inhabits temperate biomes.
