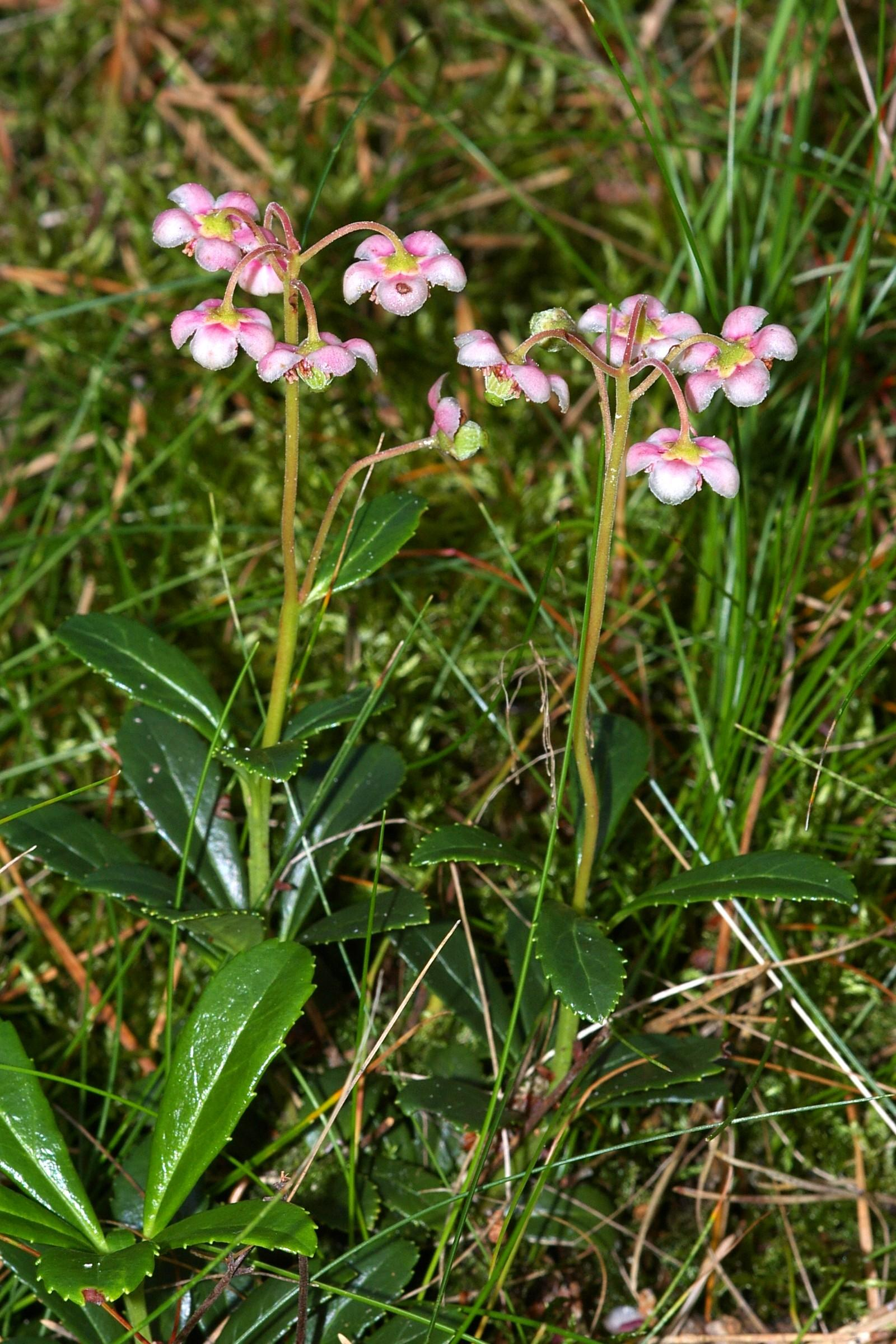
- Chimaphila umbellata

Scientific classification
- Kingdom: Plantae
- Clade: Tracheophytes
- Clade: Angiosperms
- Clade: Eudicots
- Clade: Asterids
- Order: Ericales
- Family: Ericaceae
- Subfamily: Pyroloideae
- Genus: Chimaphila; Pursh

Species
- See text

= Chimaphila =

Genus of flowering plants in the heath family

Chimaphila (prince's pine or wintergreen; from Greek: cheima 'winter' and philos 'lover', hence 'winter lover') is a genus of five species of small, evergreen, flowering plants native to temperate regions of the Northern Hemisphere. They are classified in the family Ericaceae, but were formerly placed in the segregate family Pyrolaceae.

Species

- Chimaphila japonica
- Chimaphila maculata (spotted wintergreen, also called striped wintergreen, striped prince's pine or rheumatism root)
- Chimaphila menziesii (little prince's pine)
- Chimaphila monticola
- Chimaphila umbellata (umbellate wintergreen, pipsissewa, or prince's pine)
