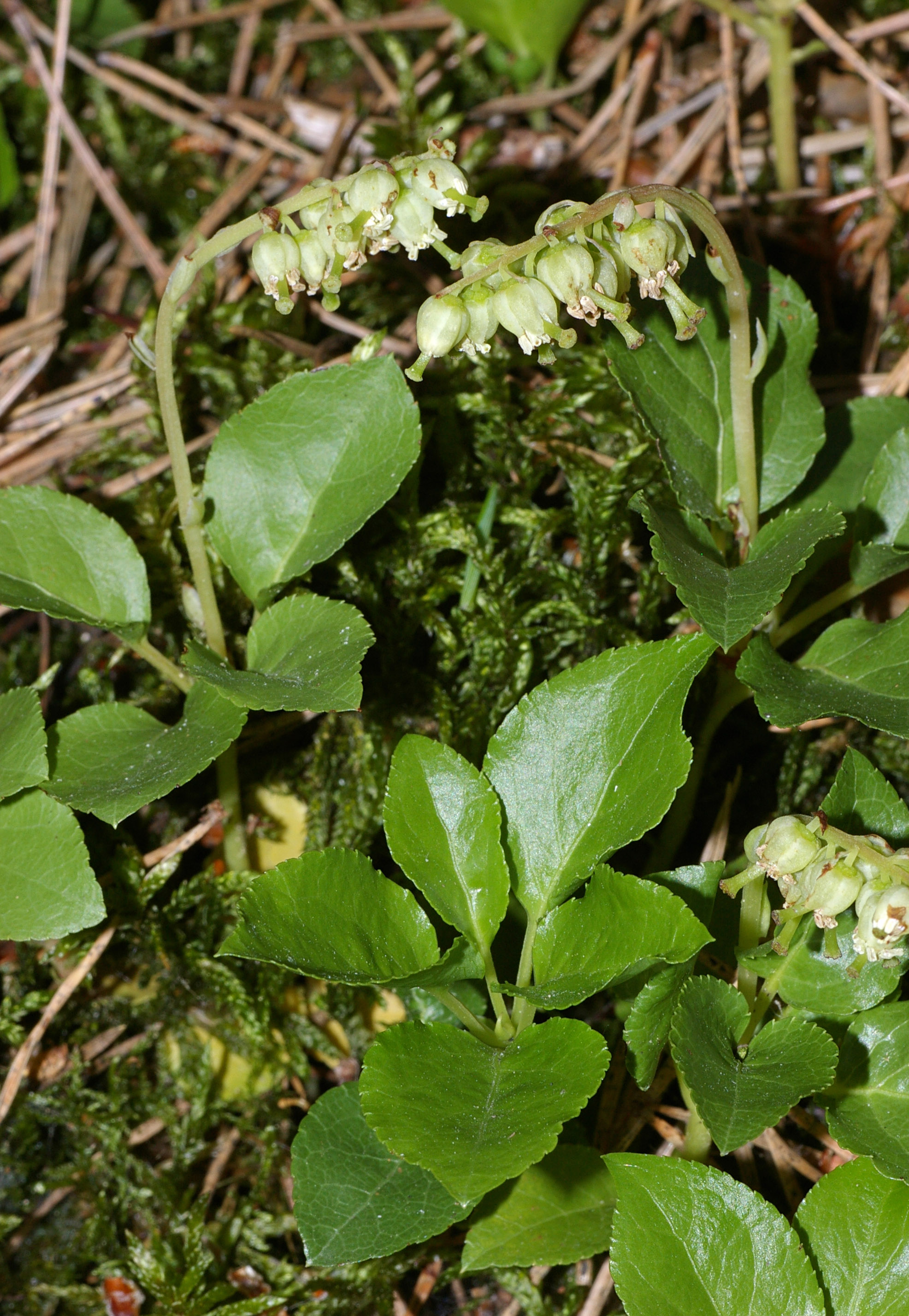

Conservation status
- Secure (NatureServe)

Scientific classification
- Kingdom: Plantae
- Clade: Tracheophytes
- Clade: Angiosperms
- Clade: Eudicots
- Clade: Asterids
- Order: Ericales
- Family: Ericaceae
- Subfamily: Pyroloideae
- Genus: Orthilia; Raf.
- Species: O. secunda

Binomial name
- Orthilia secunda (L.) House

Synonyms
- Pyrola secunda

= Orthilia =

Genus of flowering plants in the heath family

Orthilia is a genus of flowering plants in the family Ericaceae. It has only one species, Orthilia secunda. Its common names are sidebells wintergreen, one-sided-wintergreen and serrated-wintergreen. It is also called one-sided pyrola, one-sided shinleaf, and one-sided wintergreen. It was previously part of genus Pyrola, the wintergreens.

The plant has a circumboreal distribution, growing throughout much of the Northern Hemisphere.

== Mixotrophy ==
Orthilia secunda is a mixotroph. It obtains about one half of its carbon from mycorrhizal networks. Mycorrhizal fungi obtain carbon through the roots of nearby trees. Orthilia then obtains the carbon from the fungi through its roots. No counterflow of nutrients has been observed.

== Conservation status within the United States ==
It is listed as endangered and extirpated in Maryland, extirpated in Indiana, presumed extirpated in Ohio, as threatened in Iowa and Rhode Island. It is a special concern and believed extirpated in Connecticut.

== Ethnobotany ==
The Southern Carrier of the Central Interior of British Columbia, Canada, use a strong decoction of the root as an eyewash.
