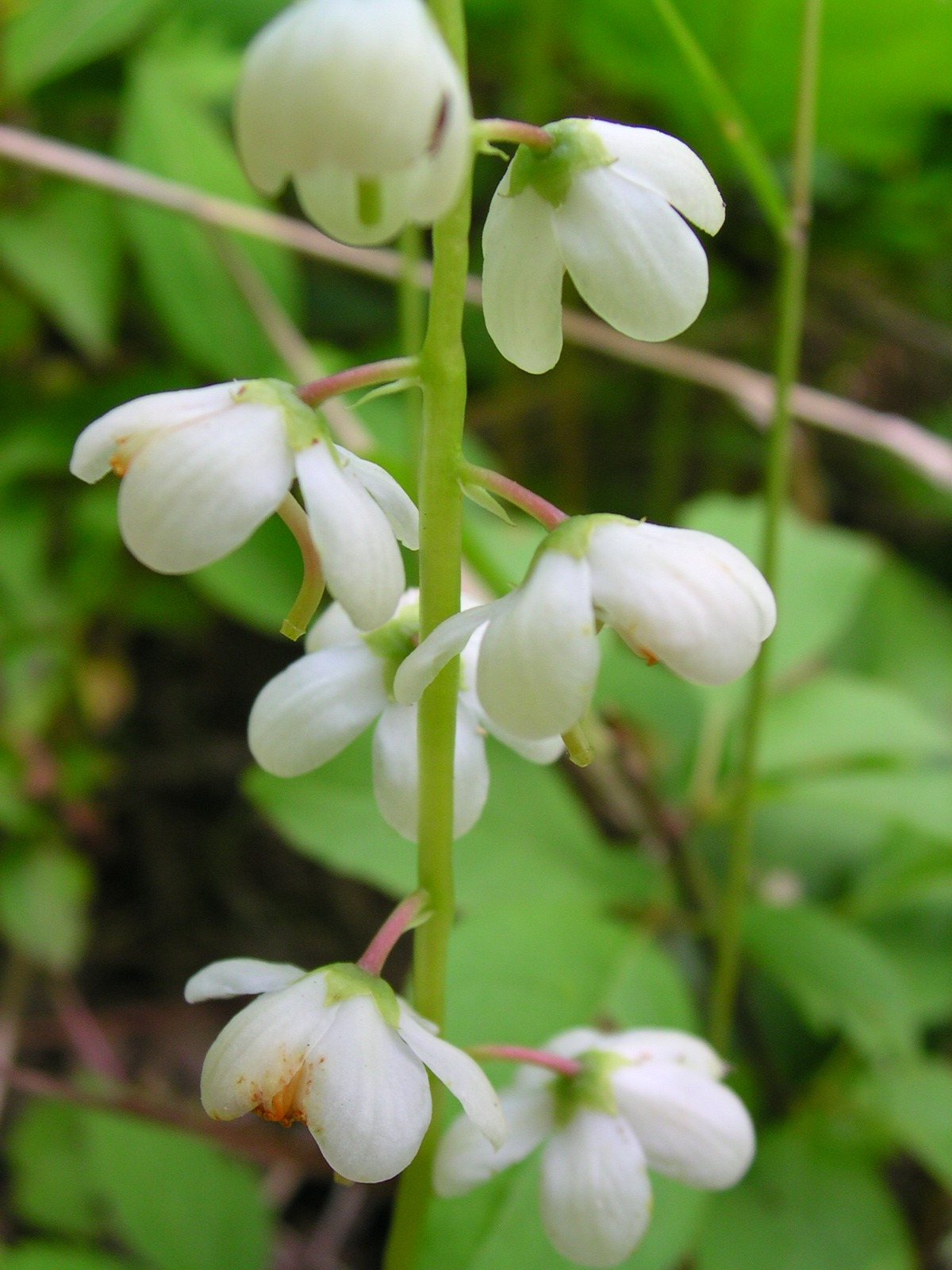

Scientific classification
- Kingdom: Plantae
- Clade: Tracheophytes
- Clade: Angiosperms
- Clade: Eudicots
- Clade: Asterids
- Order: Ericales
- Family: Ericaceae
- Genus: Pyrola
- Species: P. elliptica

Binomial name
- Pyrola elliptica Nutt.

= Pyrola elliptica =

Species of flowering plant

Pyrola elliptica, known as shinleaf, shinleaf pyrola, waxflower shinleaf, elliptic shineleaf and white wintergreen is a species of heath.

== Description ==
The plant has 5-petaled white flowers and somewhat elliptical leaves with petioles shorter than the blade. It grows 6–12 inches (15–30 cm) tall in dry woods and forest, blooming from June through August.

== Range ==
This species' range includes most of southern Canada and the northern United States, as well as part of the southwestern States.
