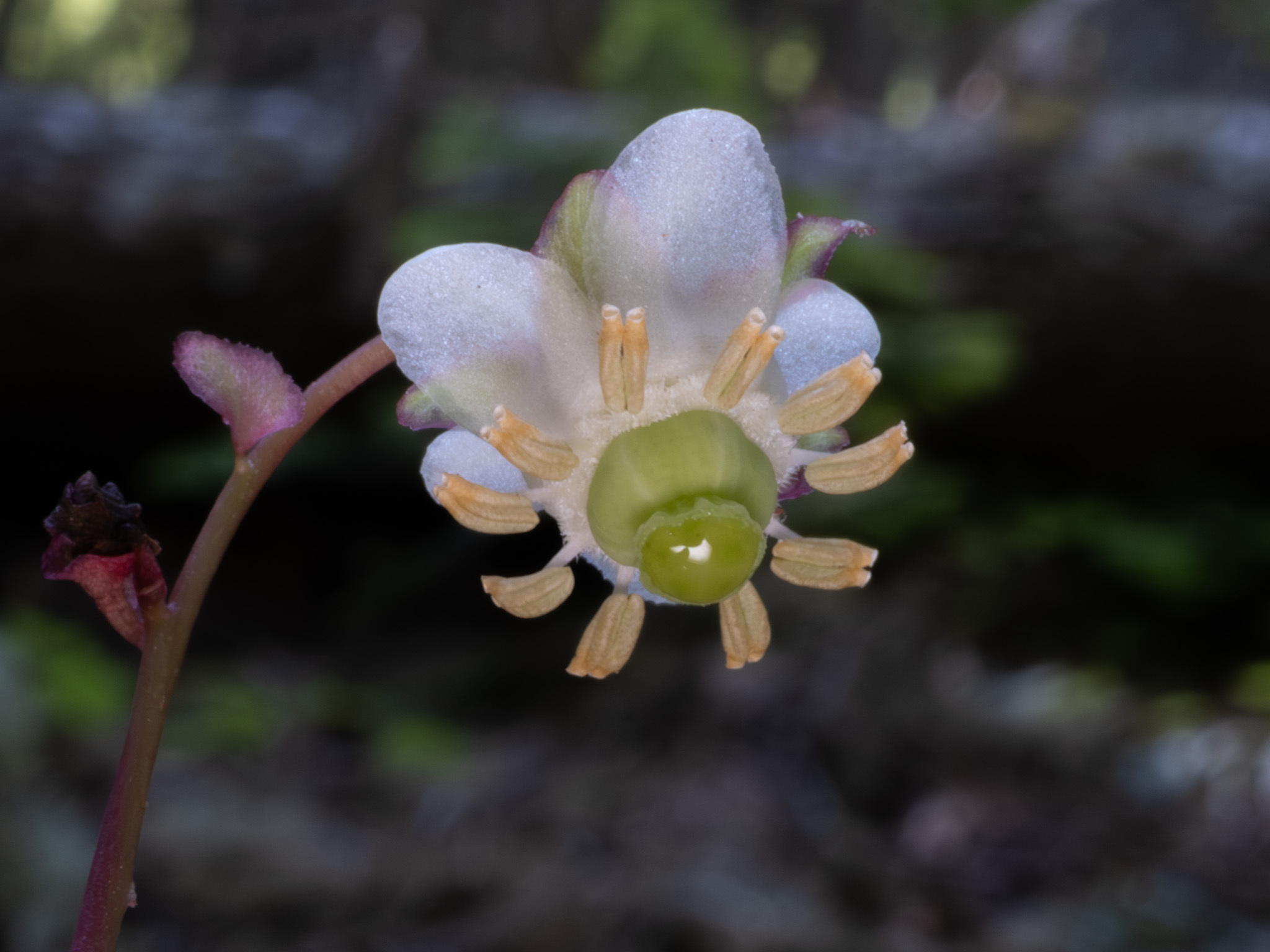

Conservation status
- Secure (NatureServe)

Scientific classification
- Kingdom: Plantae
- Clade: Tracheophytes
- Clade: Angiosperms
- Clade: Eudicots
- Clade: Asterids
- Order: Ericales
- Family: Ericaceae
- Genus: Chimaphila
- Species: C. menziesii

Binomial name
- Chimaphila menziesii (R.Br. ex D. Don) Spreng.

= Chimaphila menziesii =

Species of flowering plant

Chimaphila menziesii, known by the common names little prince's pine, little pipsissewa and Menzies' wintergreen, is a species of perennial wildflower in the heath family.

== Distribution ==
This plant is found scattered throughout the mountains of western North America where it grows in the understory of coniferous forests. It is native to the Western United States and Southwest Canada.

== Description ==
Chimaphila menziesii is a short flower with a slender reddish stem not exceeding 15 centimeters (5.9 in). The leaves are lance-shaped and a leathery rich green with light veins and tiny widely spaced teeth along the edges.

The inflorescence atop the stem produces hanging flowers on long stalks. Each flower is white to dark pink, with spreading petals around a thick center. A ring of stamens with large tubular anthers surrounds an ovary with a large buttonlike stigma. It is similar to, but smaller than, its relative the prince's pine, Chimaphila umbellata.

== Uses ==
The plant was used to make treatments to break up kidney stones or gallstones; the name Pipsissewa likely derives from the Cree word pipsisikuweu ('it breaks into little pieces').
