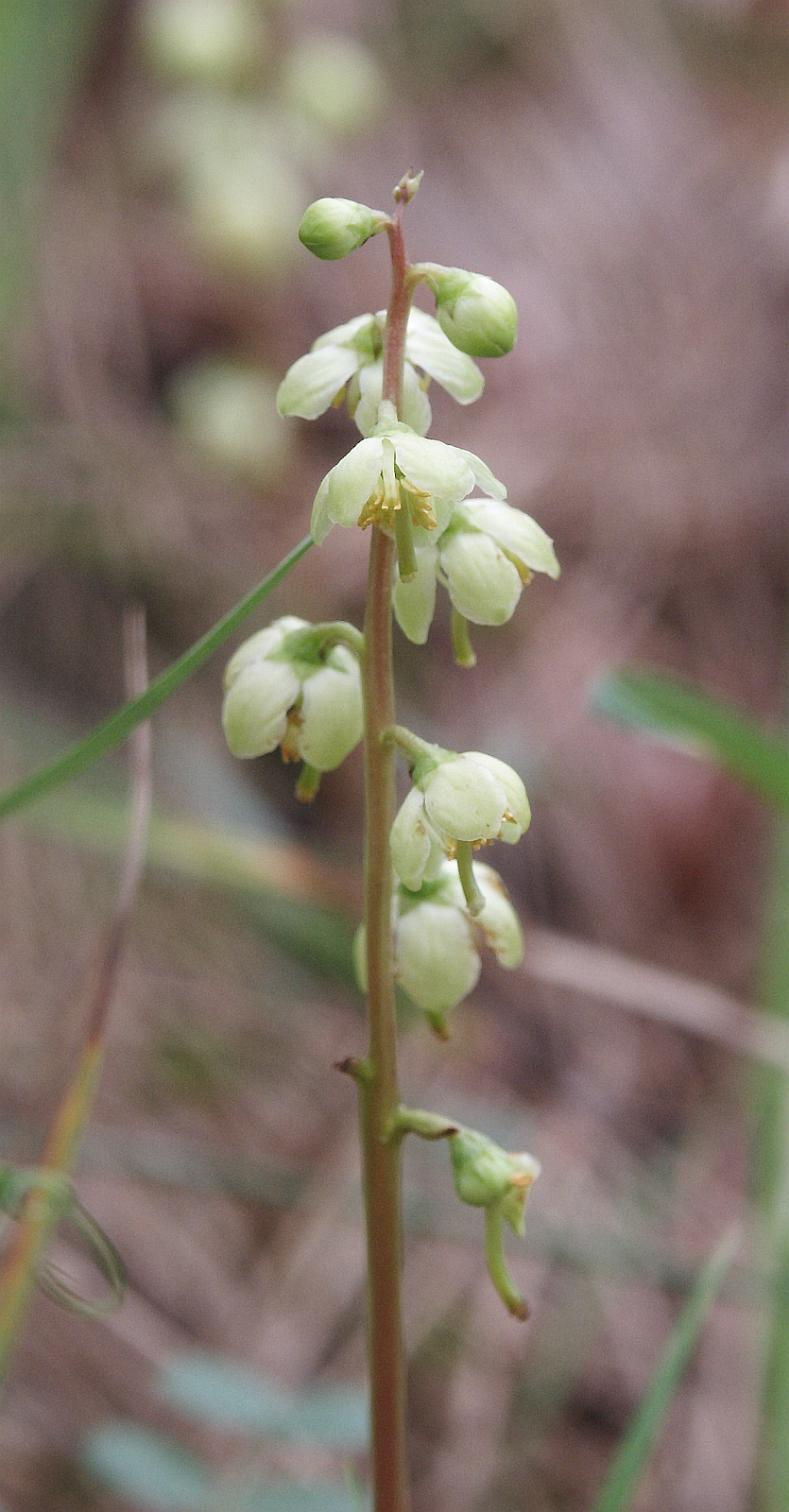

Conservation status
- Secure (NatureServe)

Scientific classification
- Kingdom: Plantae
- Clade: Tracheophytes
- Clade: Angiosperms
- Clade: Eudicots
- Clade: Asterids
- Order: Ericales
- Family: Ericaceae
- Genus: Pyrola
- Species: P. chlorantha

Binomial name
- Pyrola chlorantha Sw.

Synonyms
- Pyrola virens

= Pyrola chlorantha =

Species of flowering plant

Pyrola chlorantha, the greenflowered wintergreen, is a species of the plant genus Pyrola. It has a circumboreal distribution and is found throughout the northern latitudes of Eurasia and North America.

Pyrola chlorantha is found in the Northeastern United States and the Western United States, such as the Sierra Nevada in California. It is considered an endangered species in several of the U.S. states.
