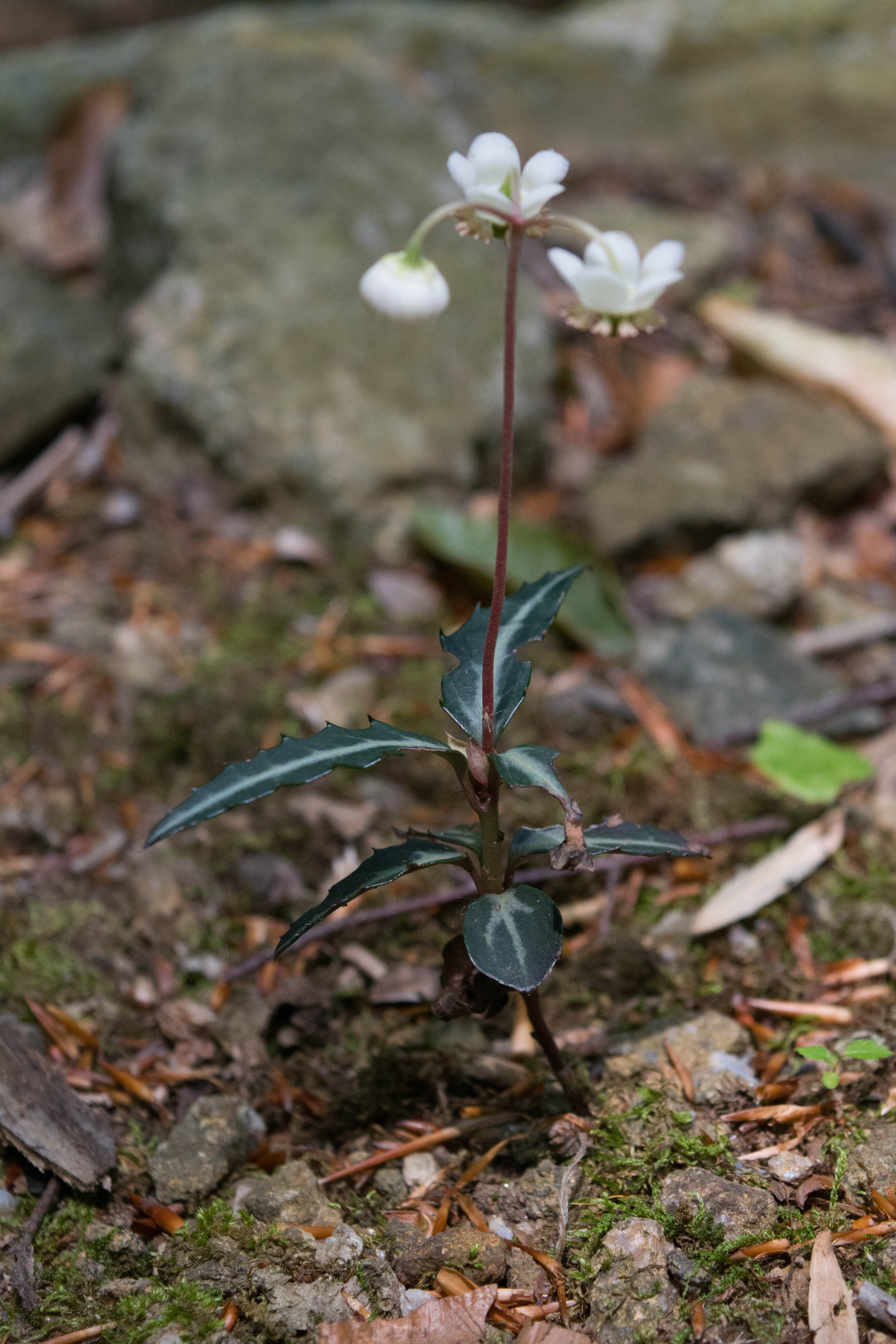
- Spotted wintergreen in flower

Conservation status
- Secure (NatureServe)

Scientific classification
- Kingdom: Plantae
- Clade: Tracheophytes
- Clade: Angiosperms
- Clade: Eudicots
- Clade: Asterids
- Order: Ericales
- Family: Ericaceae
- Genus: Chimaphila
- Species: C. maculata

Binomial name
- Chimaphila maculata (L.) Pursh

= Chimaphila maculata =

Species of flowering plant

Chimaphila maculata (spotted wintergreen, also called striped wintergreen, striped prince's pine, spotted pipsissewa, ratsbane, or rheumatism root) is a small, perennial, evergreen herb native to eastern North America and Central U.S., from southern Quebec west to Illinois, and south to Florida and Panama.

== Description ==
It has dark green, variegated leaves 2–7 cm (0.8–2.8 in) in length, and 6–26 mm (0.2–1.0 in) in width. The variegation of the leaves arises from the distinct white veins contrasted with the dark green of the leaf.

The stems emerge from creeping rhizomes, growing 10–25 cm (4–10 in) tall. The nearly round flowers, which appear in early summer, are found on top of tall stalks. They are white or pinkish and are insect pollinated. The flowers mature to small (6–8 mm (0.24–0.31 in) in diameter) capsules bearing the seeds of the plant, which are dispersed by the wind.

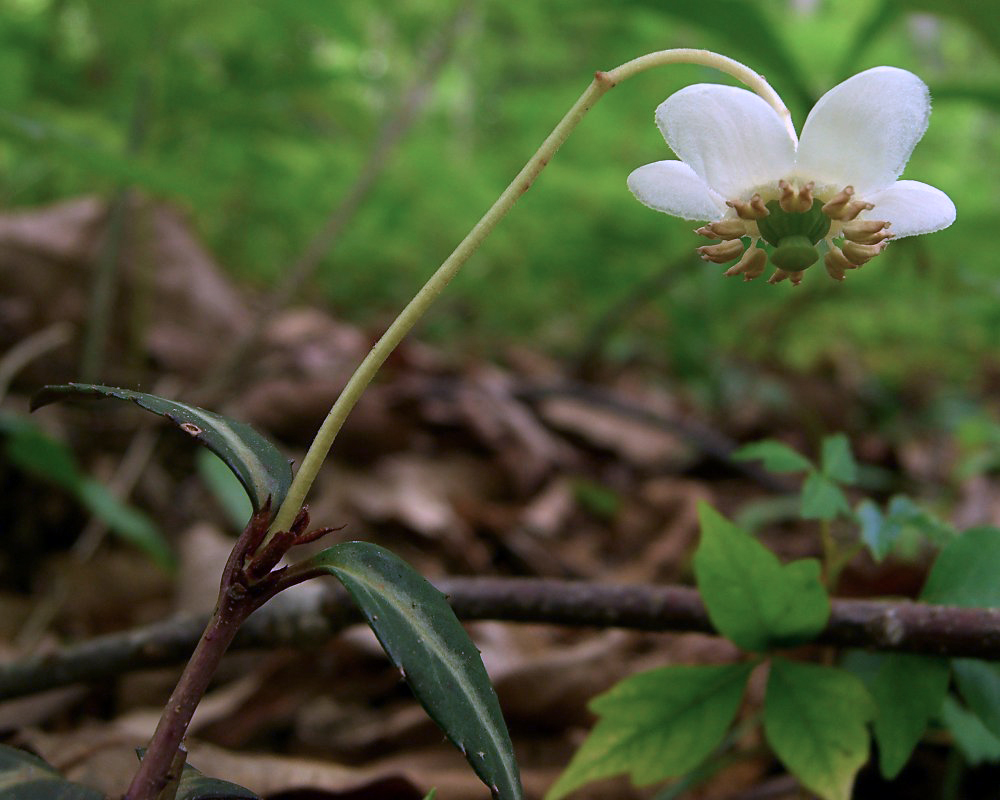
Flowering on Snowbird Mountain

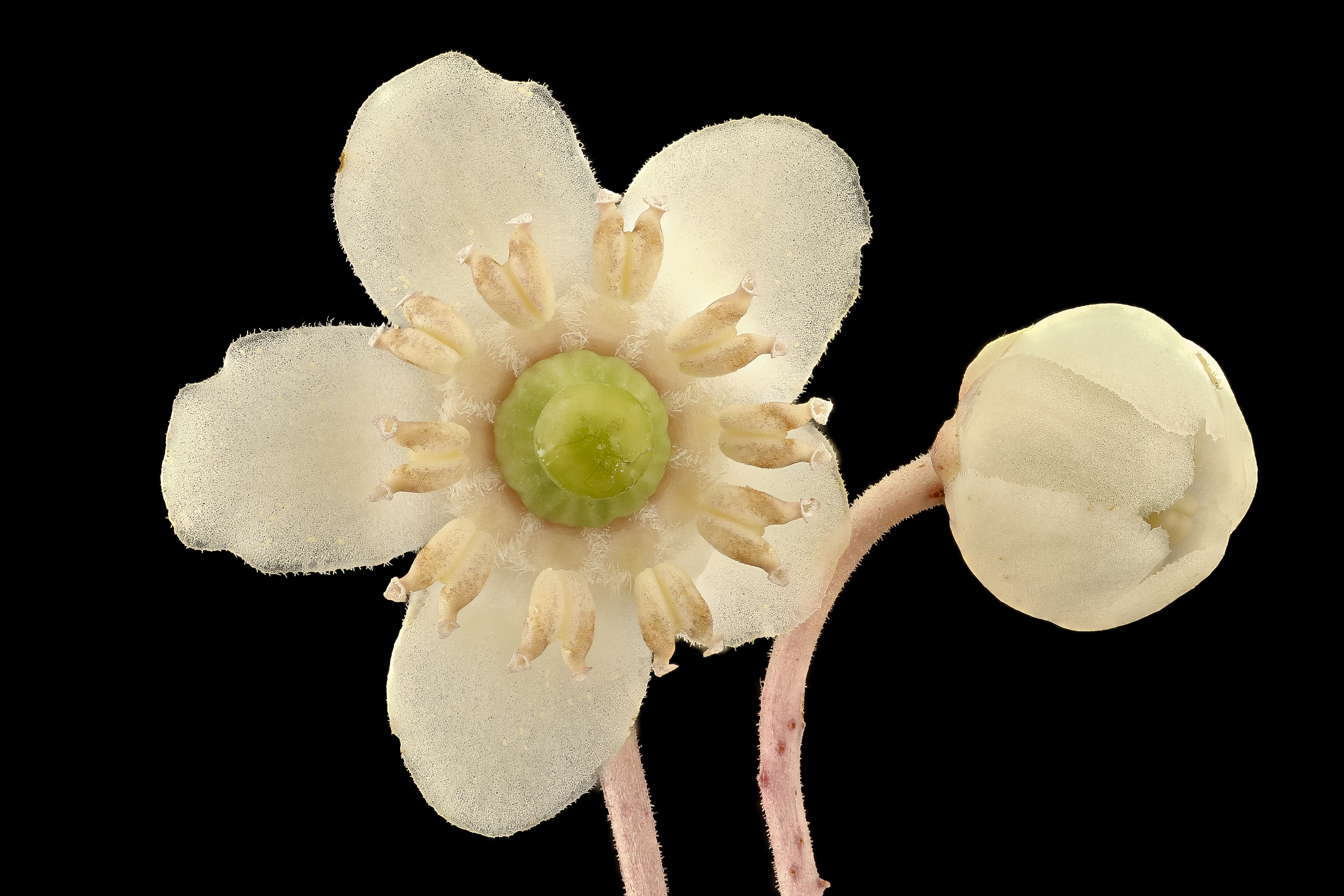
Close-up of the flower

== Ecology ==
It can typically be found in sandy habitats, well-drained upland forests, wooded slopes, oak-pine woods, old-growth forests, and similar mesic habitats and woodlands. It is very tolerant of acidic soil and shade. Like many ericaceae species, the plant is believed to partially rely on delicate mycorrhizal (and possibly ericoid mycorrhizal) connections in order to thrive.

== Medicinal history ==
"The Creek Indians called it 'pipsisikweu' – which means 'breaks into small pieces' – after the supposed ability to break down gallstones and kidney stones. ... Native Americans used its leaf tea to treat rheumatism and stomach problems, and crushed leaves were applied as a poultice to sores and wounds."

== Conservation status ==
Spotted wintergreen is endangered in Canada, as there are four living populations in southern Ontario, and there is one extremely small extant population in Quebec.

It is listed as endangered in Illinois and threatened in Maine. In New York it is considered Exploitably Vulnerable.

== See also ==
- Wintergreen (disambiguation)
- Wintergreens
