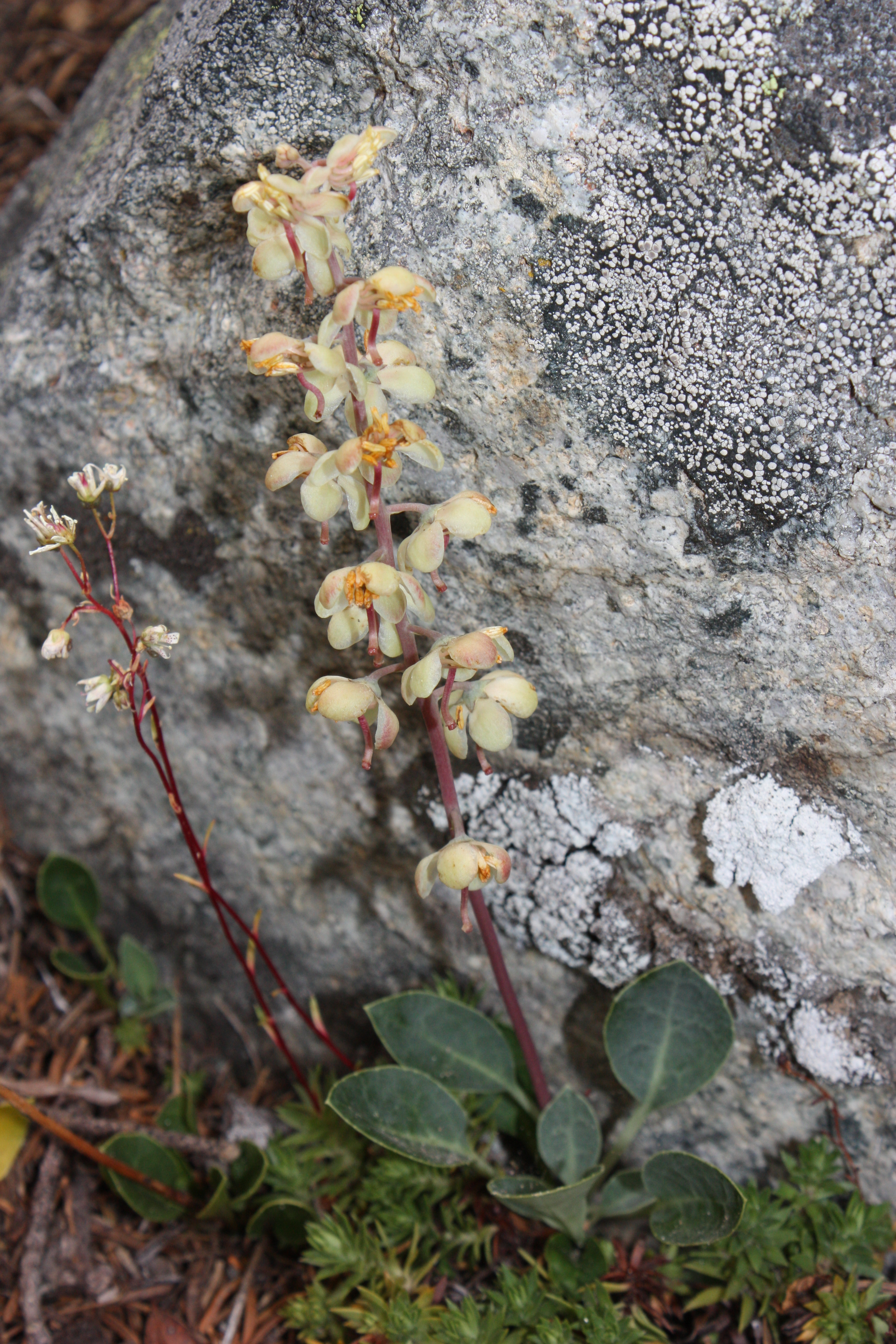
- Pyrola picta in Mount Rainier National Park

Conservation status
- Apparently Secure (NatureServe)

Scientific classification
- Kingdom: Plantae
- Clade: Tracheophytes
- Clade: Angiosperms
- Clade: Eudicots
- Clade: Asterids
- Order: Ericales
- Family: Ericaceae
- Genus: Pyrola
- Species: P. picta

Binomial name
- Pyrola picta Sm.

= Pyrola picta =

Species of herb

Pyrola picta, commonly called whiteveined wintergreen or whitevein shinleaf, is a perennial herb in the heath family. It is native to western North America from southwestern Canada to the southwestern United States.
