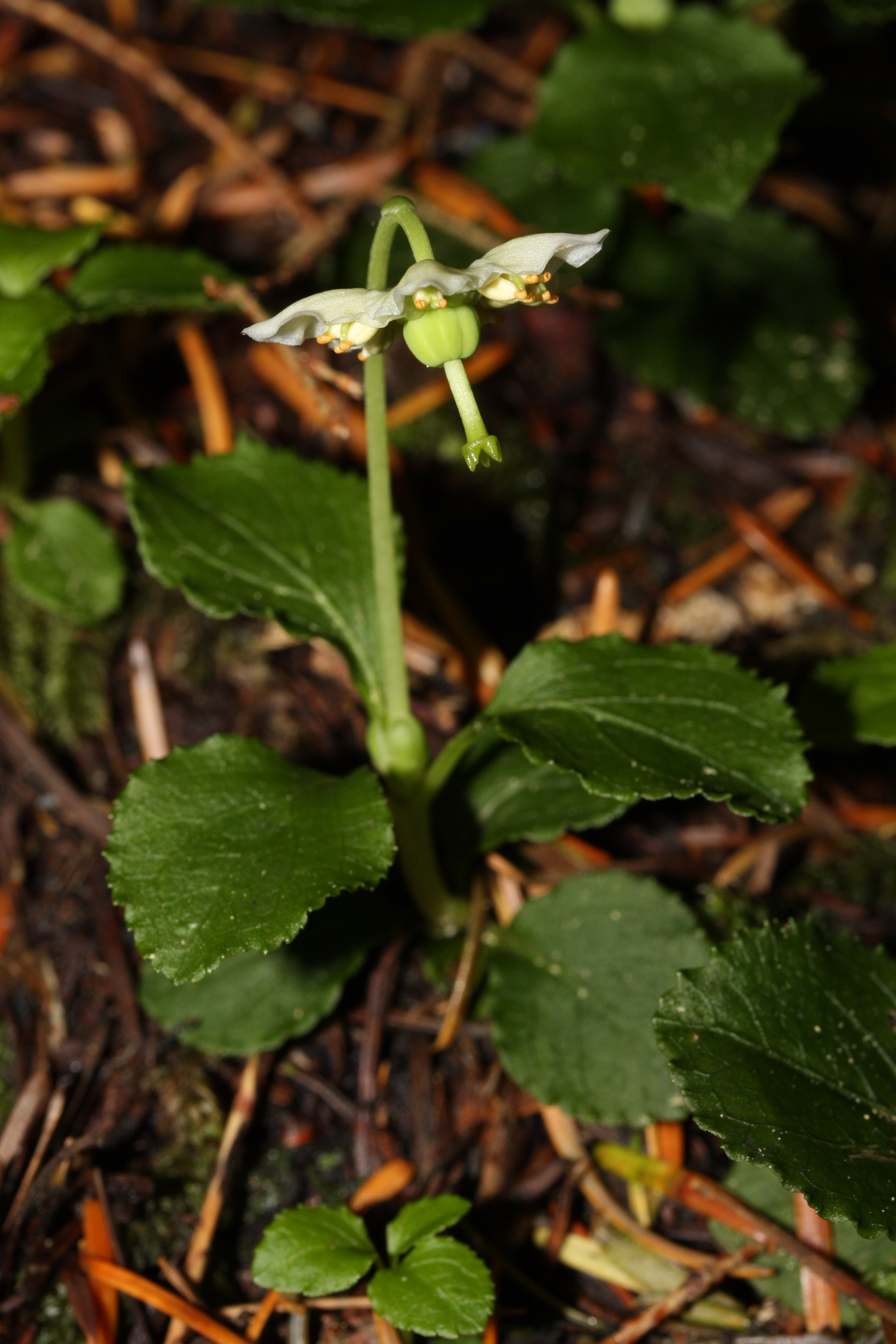
- Mount Baker-Snoqualmie National Forest

Conservation status
- Secure (NatureServe)

Scientific classification
- Kingdom: Plantae
- Clade: Tracheophytes
- Clade: Angiosperms
- Clade: Eudicots
- Clade: Asterids
- Order: Ericales
- Family: Ericaceae
- Subfamily: Pyroloideae
- Genus: Moneses; Salisb. ex Gray
- Species: M. uniflora

Binomial name
- Moneses uniflora (L.) A.Gray

= Moneses =

Genus of flowering plants in the heath family

Moneses uniflora, the one-flowered wintergreen (British Isles), single delight, wax-flower, shy maiden, star of Bethlehem (Aleutians), St. Olaf's candlestick (Norway), wood nymph, or frog's reading lamp, is a plant of the family of Ericaceae, that is indigenous to moist coniferous forests in temperate regions of the Northern Hemisphere from Spain to Japan and across North America. It is the sole member of genus Moneses.

== Etymology ==
The genus Moneses originates from the Greek word moses, which translates to 'solitary', and hesia, meaning 'delight', referencing the single flower which blooms on the plant. The plant is also referred to as wood nymph, referencing a nature goddess figure in Greek mythology that lived in forests and resembled beautiful women.

== Description and range ==
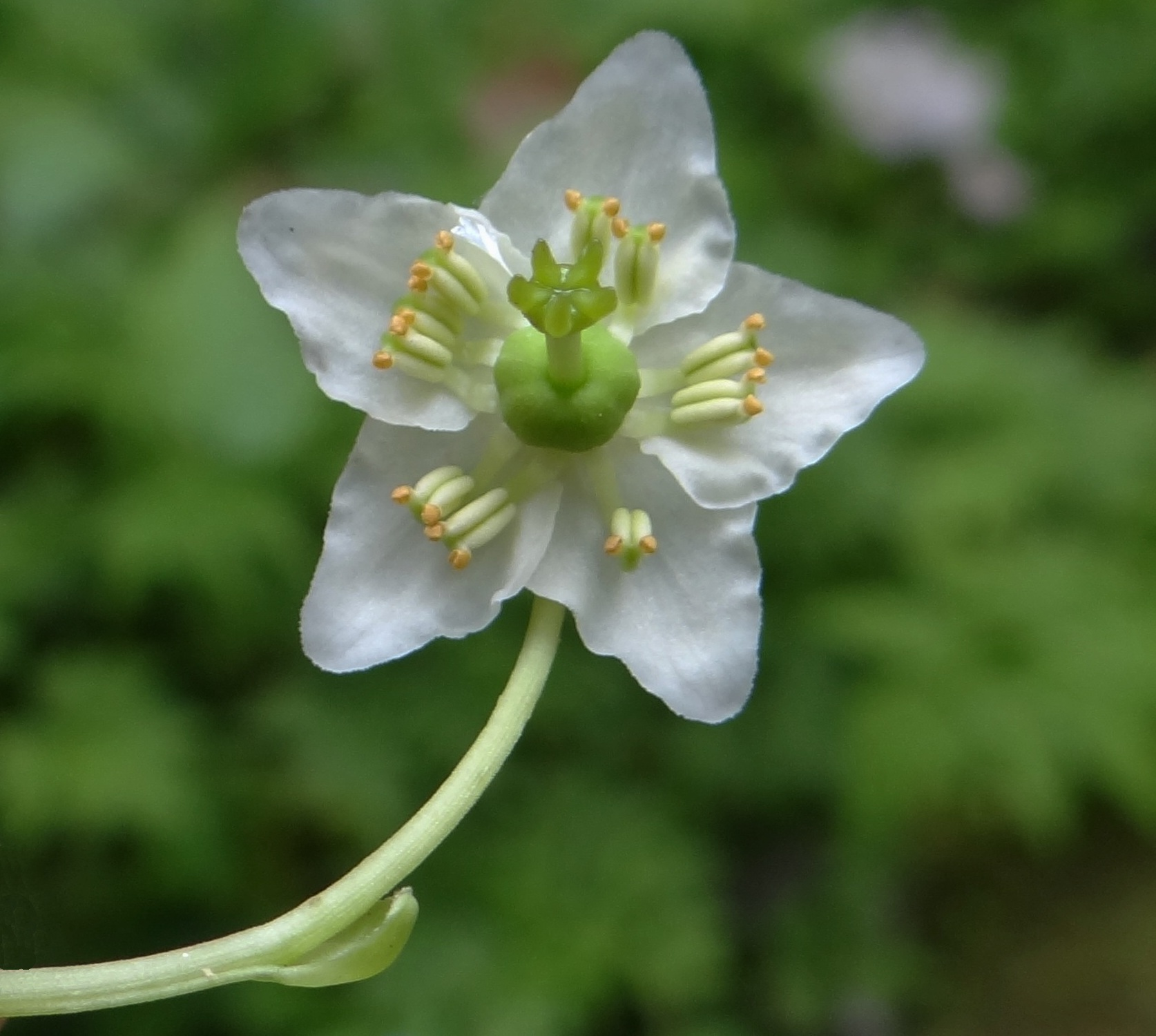
The flower, in detail

Moneses uniflora is a small plant, typically no taller than 10 cm (3.9 in) tall. A perennial herb with a slender rhizome, the leaves are basal or low, oval-elliptic to obovate, from 10 to 30 mm in diameter, with small teeth. The petiole is shorter than the leaf diameter. Each stem terminates in a nodding, fragrant flower on a stem from 30 to 170 mm (1.2 to 6.7 in) high. The corolla has a diameter of 15 to 25 mm. The spreading five white petals are slightly rumpled and are said to resemble an open white umbrella. The sepals are oval, separate and white-greenish. The flower has ten anthers, a noticeable style, and a distinctive five-pronged stigma. Flowering occurs from May to October.

Moneses uniflora has floral features (like poricidal anthers and small apical pores) consistent with flowers that reproduce through buzz pollination. The single delight's nodding flower and anther's small apical pores allow for bees in flight to sonicate mid-flight, releasing and transferring pollen between flowers. Although attractive to bees, the flower produces no nectar, and reproduces through seed.

The plant grows in moist forest environments in the holartic realm and is commonly found across North America and Eurasia. The plant flourishes in coniferous forest conditions in cooler temperatures, and is often found growing on moss and rotting plant material.

== Use in Indigenous cultures ==
Moneses uniflora has long and significant histories with several Indigenous nations across North America.

The Haida people harvested Moneses uniflora in July then dried it. The flower and fruit-producing parts of the plant were removed, while the vegetative parts were boiled into a tea, sometimes with licorice fern and Labrador tea. The tea was used to soothe colds, the flu, smallpox and cancer. The Haida people also drank it for power and luck. In one Haida story, the "Copper Salmon", the gambling son of a chief is sent to the forest to consume medicine; first devil's club, then Moneses uniflora or in the Haida language, xiláawg. Consuming these plants cleanses his intestines and gives him the power to stop his behaviour.

The Makah people also boiled Moneses uniflora with Labrador tea and licorice fern, using the entire plant to soothe coughs. They also used the plant to draw blisters.

The Kwakwaka'wakw people have used Moneses uniflora in poultices for swelling and pain, as it causes blisters. The blisters would be opened with broken mussel shells and smeared with catfish oil. When the loose skin peeled off, the site would be washed with gooseberry root extract and covered with plantain leaves until healed.

== Applications in science ==
Several First Nations within North America have indicated Moneses uniflora as a traditional medicine for tuberculosis. Some scientific studies have explored the antifungal, antiviral, and antibiotic properties of single delight flower extracts, and found that aerial parts from Moneses uniflora have inhibited growth against Mycobacterium tuberculosis and M. avium mycobacteria.
