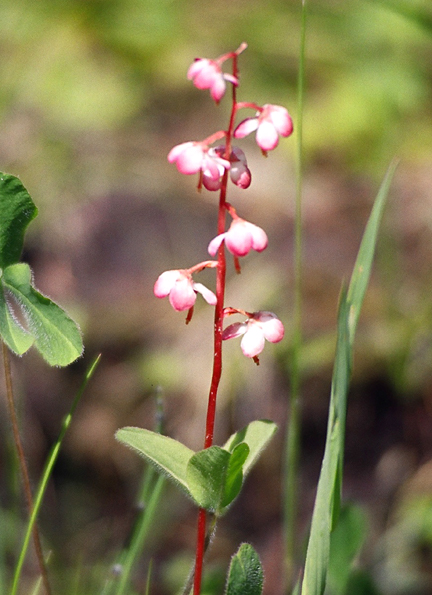
- Pyrola asarifolia

Scientific classification
- Kingdom: Plantae
- Clade: Embryophytes
- Clade: Tracheophytes
- Clade: Spermatophytes
- Clade: Angiosperms
- Clade: Eudicots
- Clade: Asterids
- Order: Ericales
- Family: Ericaceae
- Subfamily: Pyroloideae
- Genus: Pyrola; L.

Type species
- Pyrola rotundifolia L.

Species
- See here

Synonyms
- Actinocyclus Klotzsch; Amelia Alef.; Braxilia Raf.; Erxlebenia Opiz; Thelaia Alef.

= Pyrola =

Genus of flowering plants in the heath family

Pyrola /ˈpɪrələ/ is a genus of plants in the family Ericaceae native to the region spanning from the subarctic and temperate northern hemisphere to Guatemala and Sumatra.

== Description ==
=== Vegetative characteristics ===
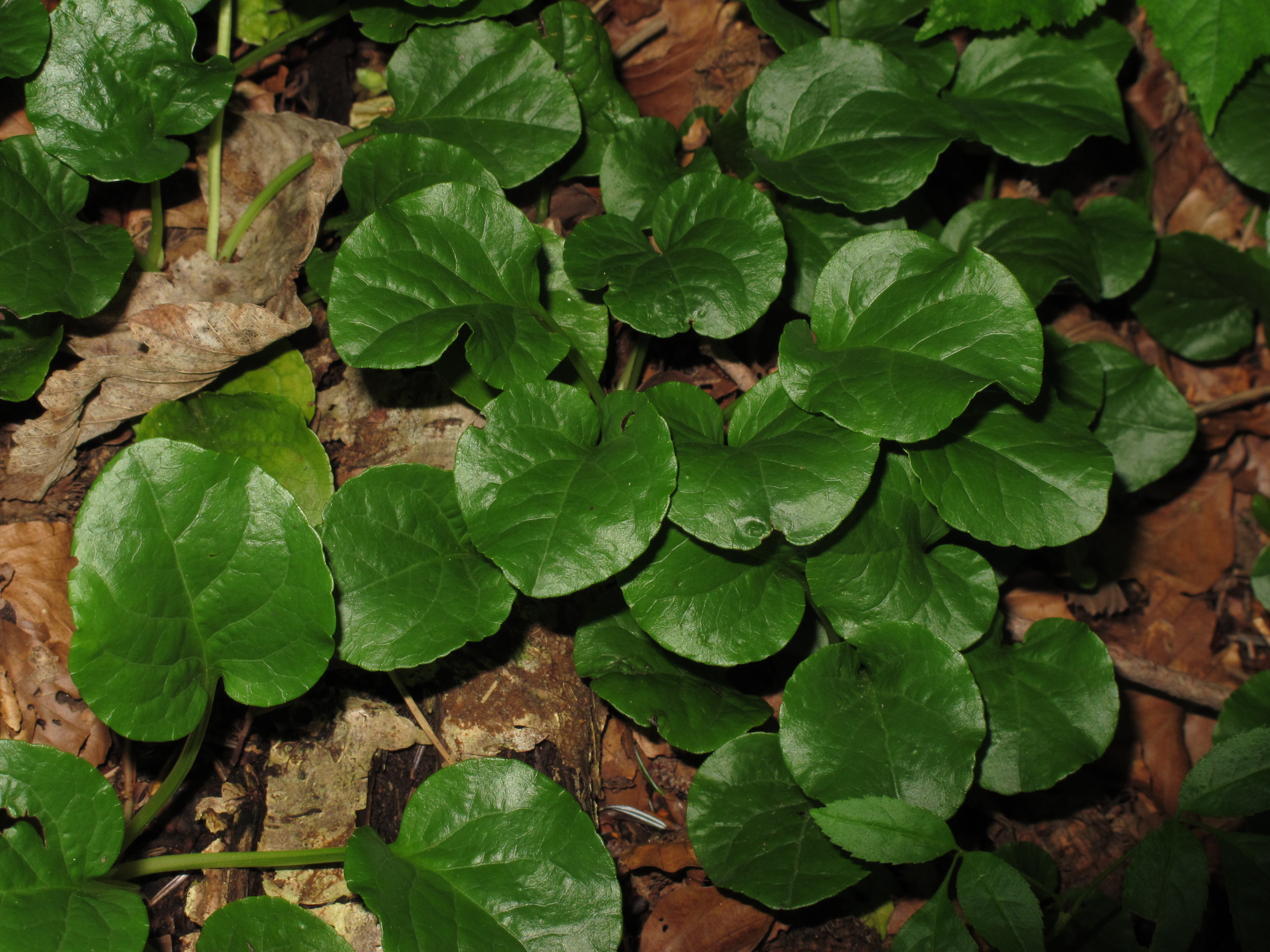
Pyrola rotundifolia foliage

Pyrola are erect, chlorophyllous or achlorophyllous, up to 35–44 cm (14–17 in) tall herbs or subshrubs with single, glabrous stems. The long, branched, slender rootstock bears fine roots.

=== Generative characteristics ===
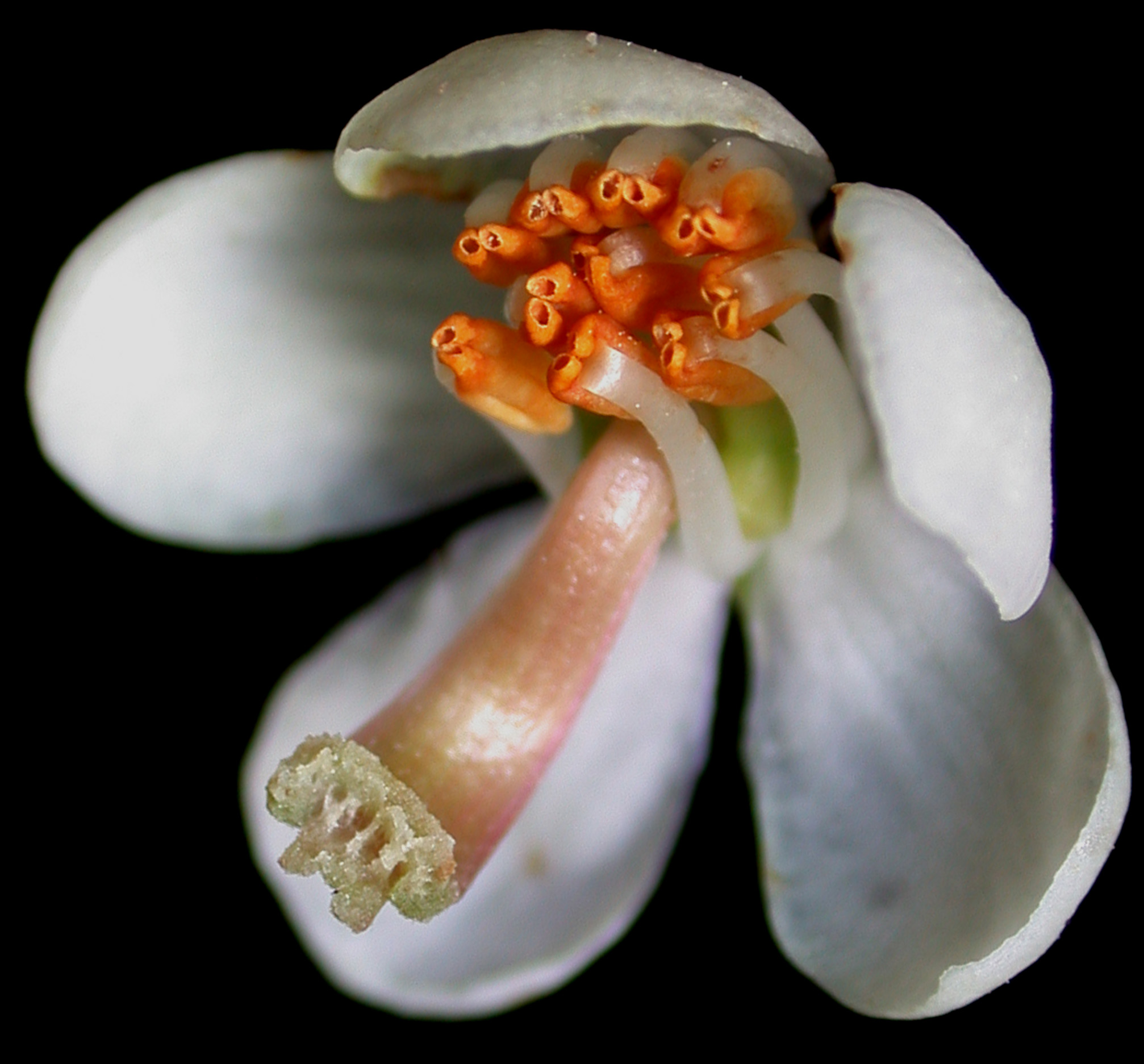
Detail of Pyrola elliptica flower

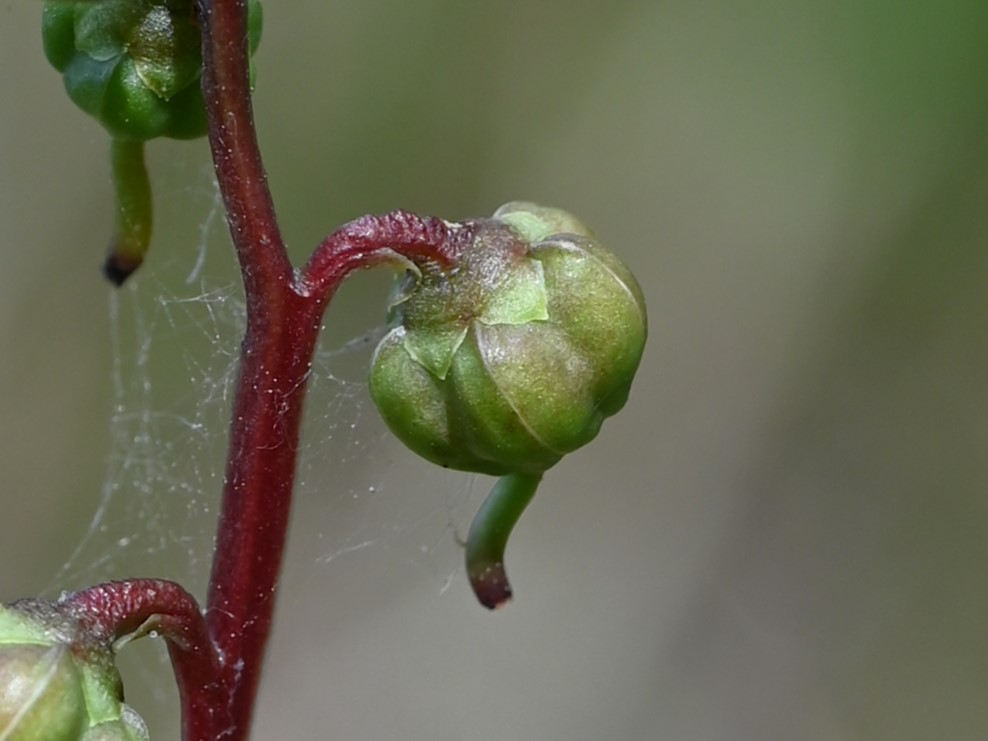
Detail of Pyrola chlorantha fruit

The many-flowered, racemose inflorescence with 1–4 scape bracts bears pedicellate, nodding, campanulate, radially symmetric or slightly zygomorphic flowers. The pendulous, loculicidal capsule fruit bears approximately 1000 winged, spindle-shaped seeds.

=== Cytology ===
The chromosome count is n = 23, 46.

== Taxonomy ==
It was described by Carl Linnaeus in 1753. The lectotype is Pyrola rotundifolia L.

=== Species ===
It has 42 accepted species:

- Pyrola alboreticulata Hayata
- Pyrola alpina Andres
- Pyrola americana Sweet
- Pyrola angustifolia (Alef.) Hemsl.
- Pyrola aphylla Sm.
- Pyrola asarifolia Michx.
- Pyrola atropurpurea Franch.
- Pyrola calliantha Andres
- Pyrola carpatica Holub & Křísa
- Pyrola chlorantha Sw.
- Pyrola chouana Chang Y.Yang
- Pyrola corbierei H.Lév.
- Pyrola crypta Jolles
- Pyrola dahurica (Andres) Kom.
- Pyrola decorata Andres
- Pyrola dentata Sm.
- Pyrola elegantula Andres
- Pyrola elliptica Nutt.
- Pyrola faurieana Handres
- Pyrola forrestiana Andres
- Pyrola × graebneriana Seemen
- Pyrola grandiflora Radius
- Pyrola japonica Alef.
- Pyrola karakoramica Křísa
- Pyrola macrocalyx Ohwi
- Pyrola markonica Y.L.Chou & R.C.Zhou
- Pyrola mattfeldiana Andres
- Pyrola media Sw.
- Pyrola minor L.
- Pyrola morrisonensis (Hayata) Hayata
- Pyrola nephrophylla (Andres) Andres
- Pyrola norvegica Knaben
- Pyrola picta Sm.
- Pyrola renifolia Maxim.
- Pyrola rotundifolia L.
- Pyrola rugosa Andres
- Pyrola shanxiensis Y.L.Chou & R.C.Zhou
- Pyrola sororia Andres
- Pyrola subaphylla Maxim.
- Pyrola sumatrana Andres
- Pyrola szechuanica Andres
- Pyrola tschanbaischanica Y.L.Chou & Y.L.Chang
- Pyrola xinjiangensis Y.L.Chou & R.C.Zhou

== Pharmacology ==
Pyrola elliptica, commonly known as "shinleaf", contains a drug related to aspirin, and the leaves have been used to treat bruises. Its common name derives from its use in shin casting.
