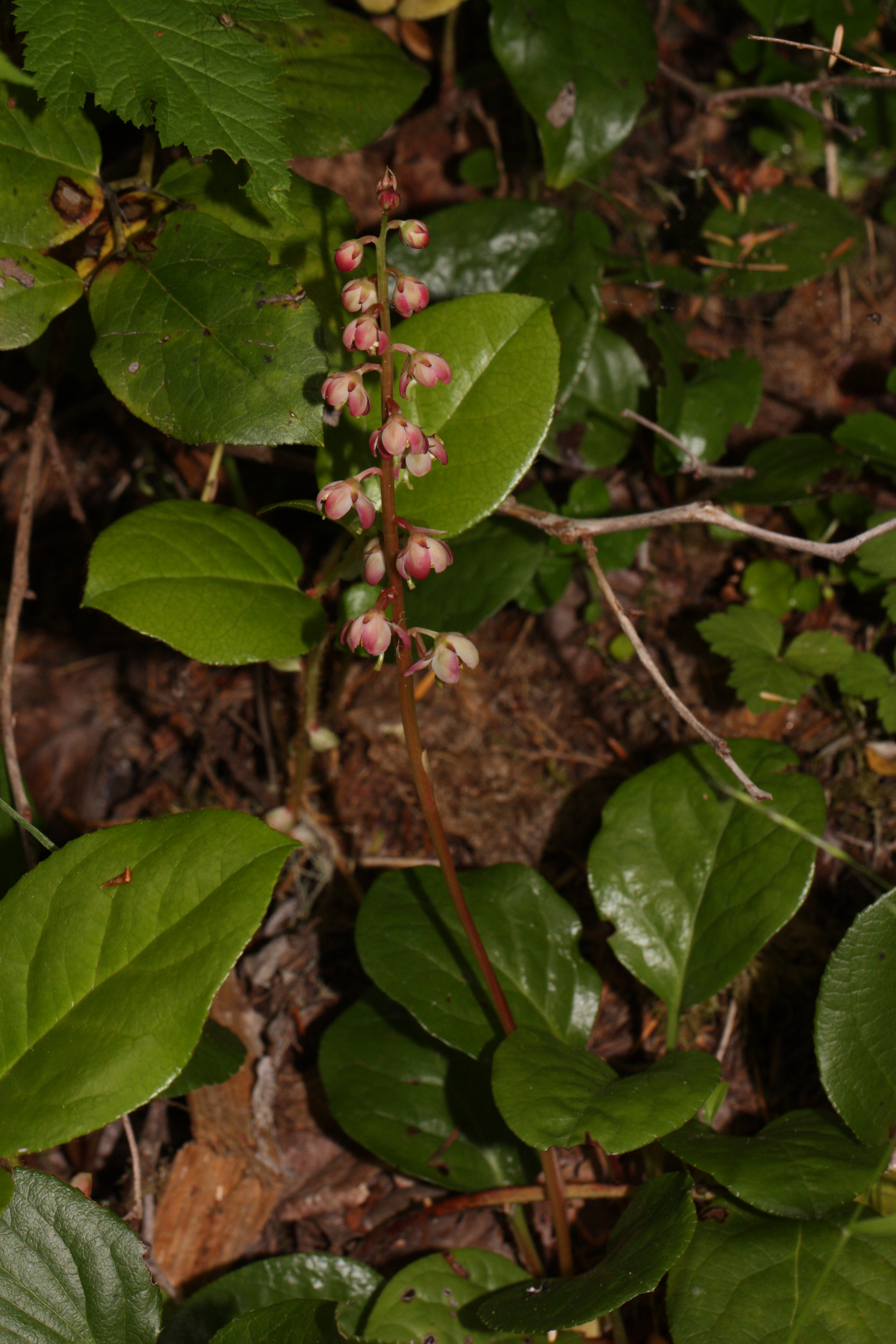
- Pyrola asarifolia subsp. asarifolia

Conservation status
- Secure (NatureServe)

Scientific classification
- Kingdom: Plantae
- Clade: Embryophytes
- Clade: Tracheophytes
- Clade: Spermatophytes
- Clade: Angiosperms
- Clade: Eudicots
- Clade: Asterids
- Order: Ericales
- Family: Ericaceae
- Genus: Pyrola
- Species: P. asarifolia

Binomial name
- Pyrola asarifolia Michx.

Subspecies
- P. asarifolia subsp. asarifolia P. asarifolia subsp. bracteata

= Pyrola asarifolia =

Species of flowering plant

Pyrola asarifolia, commonly known as liverleaf wintergreen, bog wintergreen, alpine wintergreen, pink wintergreen, or pink shinleaf, is a plant species of the genus Pyrola native to North America. It is found in Canada and northern US, primarily in cool, moist environments. It is so named simply because its leaves maintain their green color through winter. It has uses in traditional medicine.

== Appearance ==
It has circular to heart-shaped leaves which lay close to the ground. It also has a nearly leafless stalk which grows the flowers and reaches up to 40 cm (16 in) tall, from which a raceme of 4-25 pink five-petaled flowers grow.

== Habitat and Lifecycle ==
Its dust-like seeds are hard to germinate, but may also be propagated through leaves and rhizomes. It survives best in full shade; in soil that is neutral, wet but well-drained, and nutrient-rich; and in a variety of habitats. It is an evergreen, glabrous, creeping perennial. When a fire occurs, its ability to survive varies depending on the fire site: it may depend on whether heat from the fire enters the soil deep enough to kill the rhizomes.
