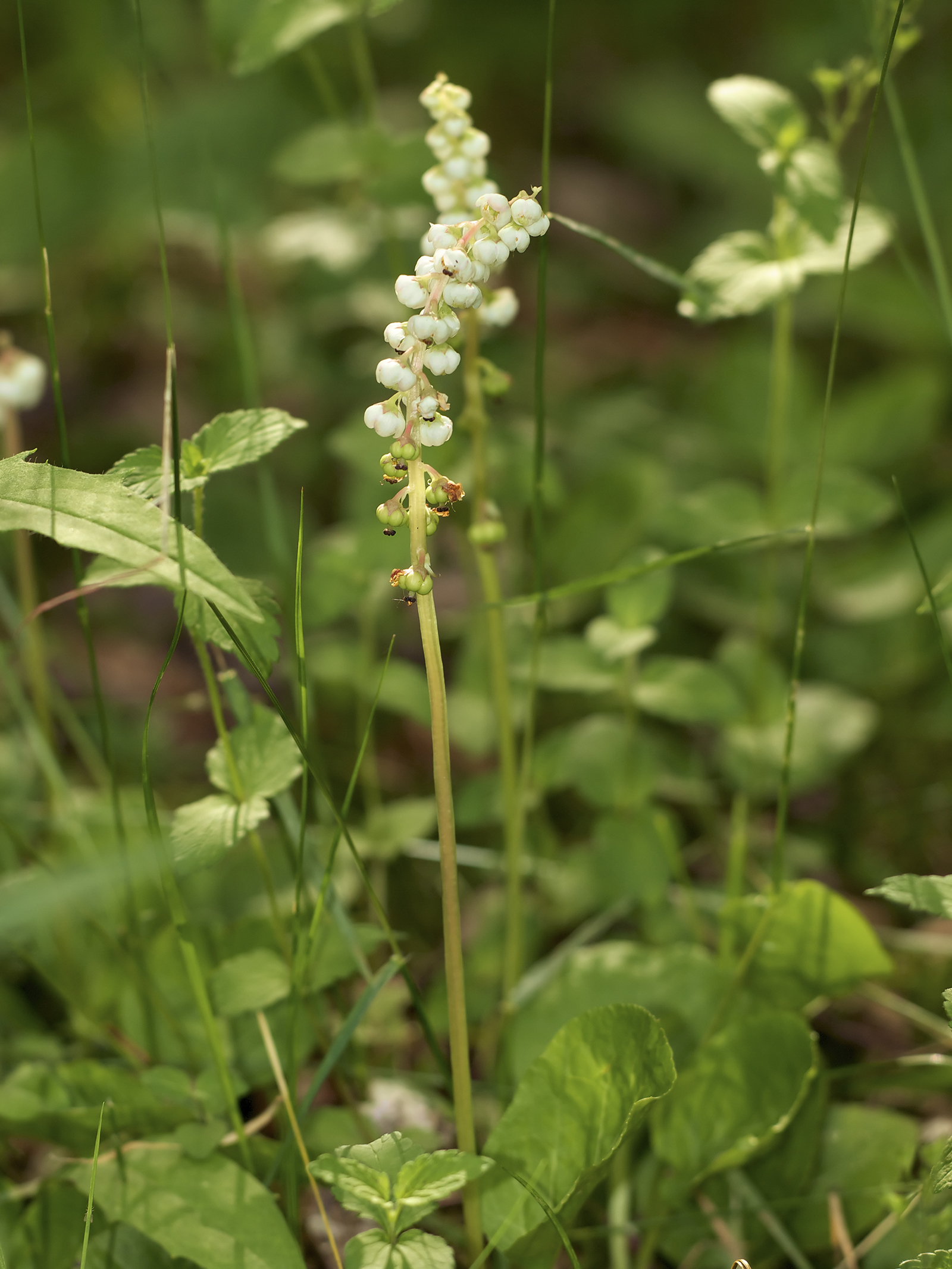

Conservation status
- Secure (NatureServe)

Scientific classification
- Kingdom: Plantae
- Clade: Tracheophytes
- Clade: Angiosperms
- Clade: Eudicots
- Clade: Asterids
- Order: Ericales
- Family: Ericaceae
- Genus: Pyrola
- Species: P. minor

Binomial name
- Pyrola minor L.

= Pyrola minor =

Species of flowering plant

Pyrola minor, known by the common names snowline wintergreen, lesser wintergreen, and common wintergreen, is a plant species of the genus Pyrola. It is a perennial herb or subshrub growing up to 1 ft (0.30 m) tall. It has a Circumboreal distribution and can be found throughout the northern latitudes of Eurasia and North America. It grows in moist areas. Flowers bloom June to August. The plant is mostly self-pollinating; it does not even bother to attract pollinators with the scent of its flowers or by secreting nectar.

== Description ==
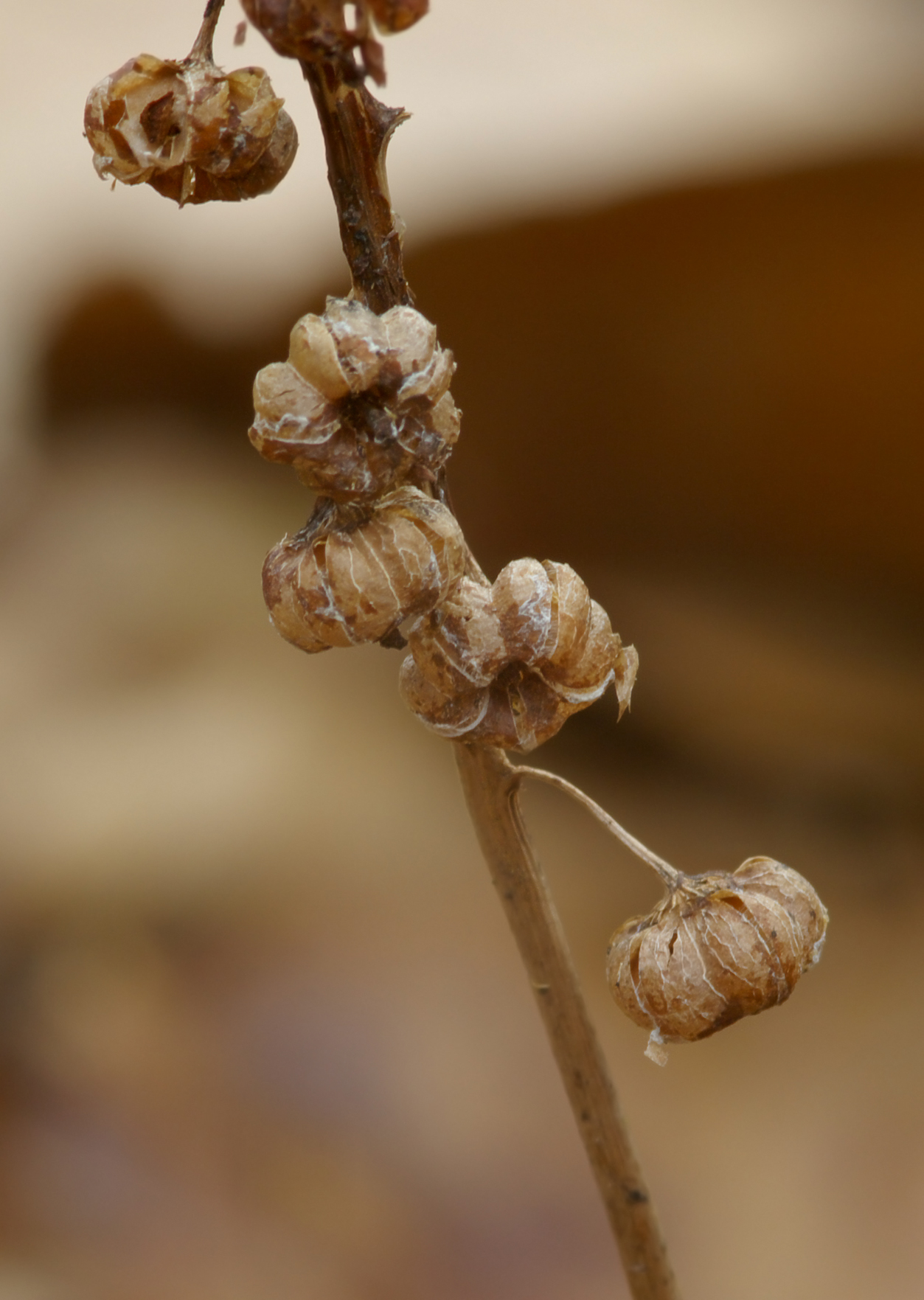
Fruit

It is a sclerophyll, with leaves that appear in rosettes. The blades are 2-5 cm wide and simple and basal in arrangement. They are quite thin, broadly elliptic with a round or abruptly tapering tip. The leaf-stalk is usually shorter than the blade. The spherical flowers are nodding, 5-7 mm wide. The sepals are triangular. Gynoecia are inside the flower, with a short style. Flowers have five petals that are pale pink to rose in color. The fruit of the flower are nodding 5-segmented capsules; the style of the gynoecia are preserved at the tip of the capsule.
