= Cenad Forest =

Protected area in Romania

Cenad Forest Romanian: Pădurea Cenad
- Location within Romania
- Interactive map of Cenad Forest

Geography
- Location: Timiș County, Romania
- Coordinates: 46°10′0″N 20°32′35″E
- Elevation: 90 m (300 ft)
- Area: 279.2 ha (690 acres)

Administration
- Status: Protected area
- Established: 1995

Ecology
- Dominant tree species: Quercus sp., Fraxinus sp., Salix sp., Populus sp.

Cenad Forest (Romanian: Pădurea Cenad) is a protected area of national interest corresponding to IUCN category IV, located in western Romania, on the administrative territory of Arad and Timiș counties.

== Location ==
The natural area, covering 279.2 hectares, is situated in the northwestern part of Timiș County, within the administrative boundaries of the communes of Cenad, Sânpetru Mare, and Periam, as well as in the southwestern part of Arad County, within the administrative territory of the town of Pecica.

== Description ==
The nature reserve, part of the Mureș Floodplain Natural Park, was designated a protected area under Law No. 5 of March 6, 2000. The forest is situated in the Mureș Low Plain, within the floodplain area between the dike and the riverbank. This landform shares general characteristics with other non-flooded loess plains and recently formed, flood-prone alluvial plains within the broad Tisa Depression.

The main habitats found here are freshwater, wetlands, grassy formations, meadows and shrubs, bushes and forests. The reserve is characterized by a lithological substrate formed by sandy alluvial deposits and gravels, located on lacustrine clay beds. It includes the Great Island of Cenad and the Igriș islands, of variable size, also declared protected areas.

=== Flora ===
A survey of the cormophyte flora in the Cenad Forest and its surrounding areas has identified a total of 355 species of angiosperms. Phytogeographical analysis reveals that the dominant elements of this flora are Eurasian, complemented by a significant presence of both European and Central European species.

Among the European species, several key arboreal taxa play a crucial role in shaping the forest vegetation, including Quercus robur, Acer campestre, Ulmus laevis, Crataegus monogyna, and Euonymus europaeus. Additionally, herbaceous plants typical of mesophilous forest habitats, such as Stellaria nemorum, Rumex sanguineus, Mycelis muralis, and Festuca sylvatica, are also well represented.

Central European elements are found primarily in moist forest and meadow environments. Notable species include Clematis vitalba, Chaerophyllum hirsutum, Corydalis cava, Gagea pratensis, Rorippa austriaca, Thalictrum lucidum, Scutellaria hastifolia, and Arrhenatherum elatius.

Mediterranean species—broadly defined to also encompass Atlantic-Mediterranean elements—suggest postglacial migration patterns originating from southwestern refugia. These species occur either within sheltered forest microhabitats, such as Celtis australis, Hedera helix, Tamus communis, Viola odorata, Anthriscus trichosperma, and Oryzopsis virescens, or in the mesoxerophilous grasslands along the Mureș River embankment, represented by species like Dasypyrum villosum, Valerianella locusta, Veronica praecox, Papaver hybridum, Trifolium incarnatum, Calepina irregularis, and Vicia villosa.
