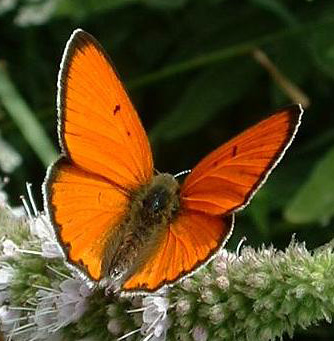
- Male

Conservation status
- Near Threatened (IUCN 3.1)

Scientific classification
- Kingdom: Animalia
- Phylum: Arthropoda
- Clade: Pancrustacea
- Class: Insecta
- Order: Lepidoptera
- Family: Lycaenidae
- Genus: Lycaena
- Species: L. dispar

Binomial name
- Lycaena dispar (Haworth, 1802)

Synonyms
- Papilio dispar Haworth, 1802

= Large copper =

Species of butterfly

Large copper (Lycaena dispar) is a butterfly of the family Lycaenidae. Lycaena dispar is widely distributed across temperate Eurasia from western Europe to the Amur region, Korea and Manchuria. While it is currently in severe decline in north-western Europe, it is expanding in central, northern and eastern regions.

Three European subspecies are commonly recognized: L. dispar dispar (single-brooded), the now-extinct English subspecies; L. d. batavus (usually single-brooded), the Dutch subspecies; and L. d. rutilus (double-brooded), which is widespread across the rest of the continent. Several Asian subspecies extend the range eastward. The species has been declining in many European countries mainly as a result of habitat loss.

== Description ==
Lycaena dispar is a large lycaenid butterfly with a wingspan of 44–52 mm. The species exhibits strong sexual dimorphism. Males have bright orange wings with narrow black margins and white fringes. The short androconia (sex brands) are located near the leading edge of the forewing. Females have broader dark brown margins on the forewings with a parallel row of dark spots.

Both sexes have distinctive silvery-blue hindwing undersides patterned with black spots and an orange submarginal band. This silvery underside distinguishes L. dispar from related species such as Lycaena virgaureae and L. hippothoe, which inhabit drier environments.

The subspecies can be differentiated by size, extent of black markings, and the length of the orange band on the hindwing underside. The extinct English subspecies (L. d. dispar) was notably variable in size and had larger spots on the underside than continental European forms.

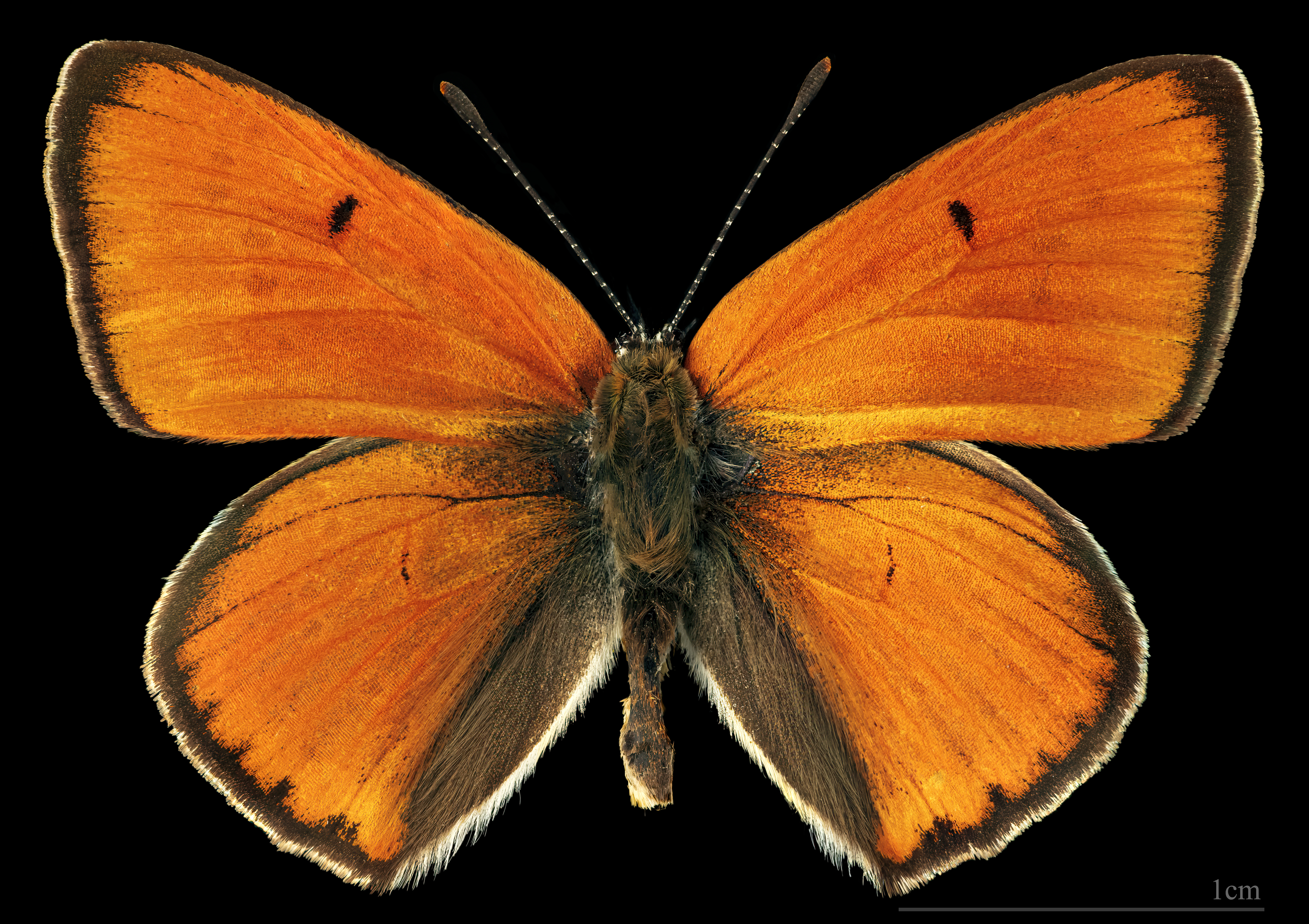
Lycaena dispar ♂

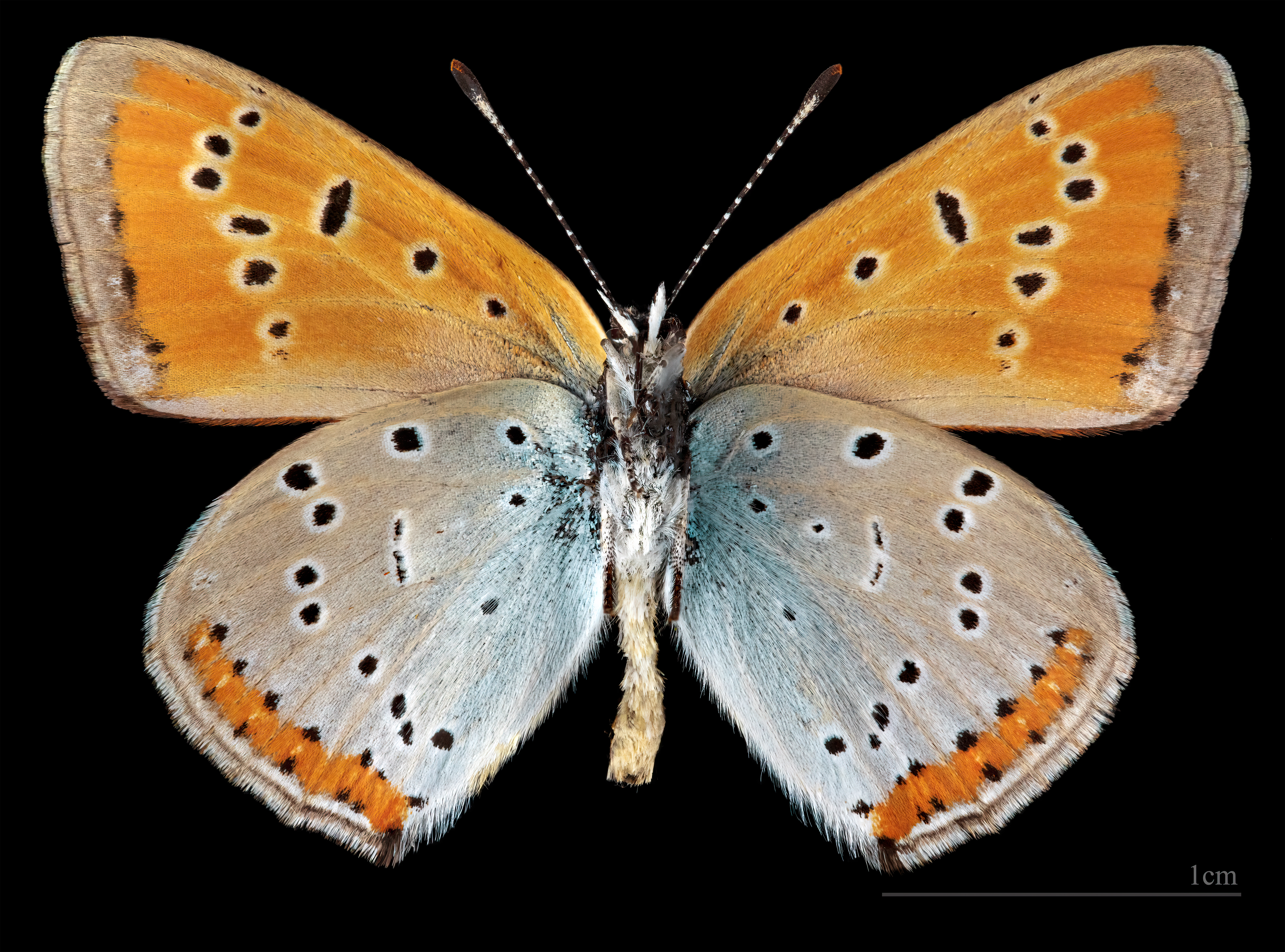
Lycaena dispar ♂ △

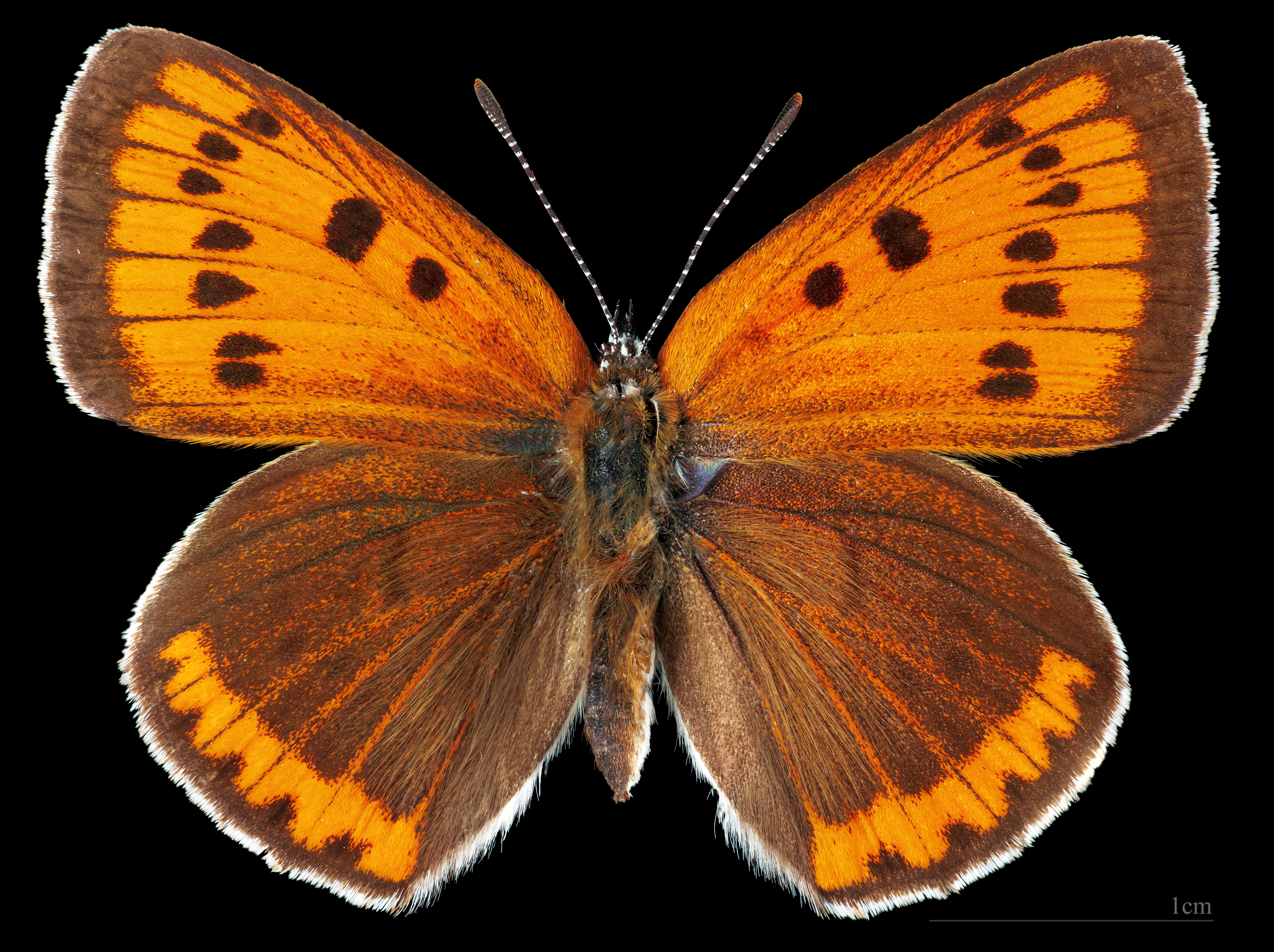
Lycaena dispar ♀

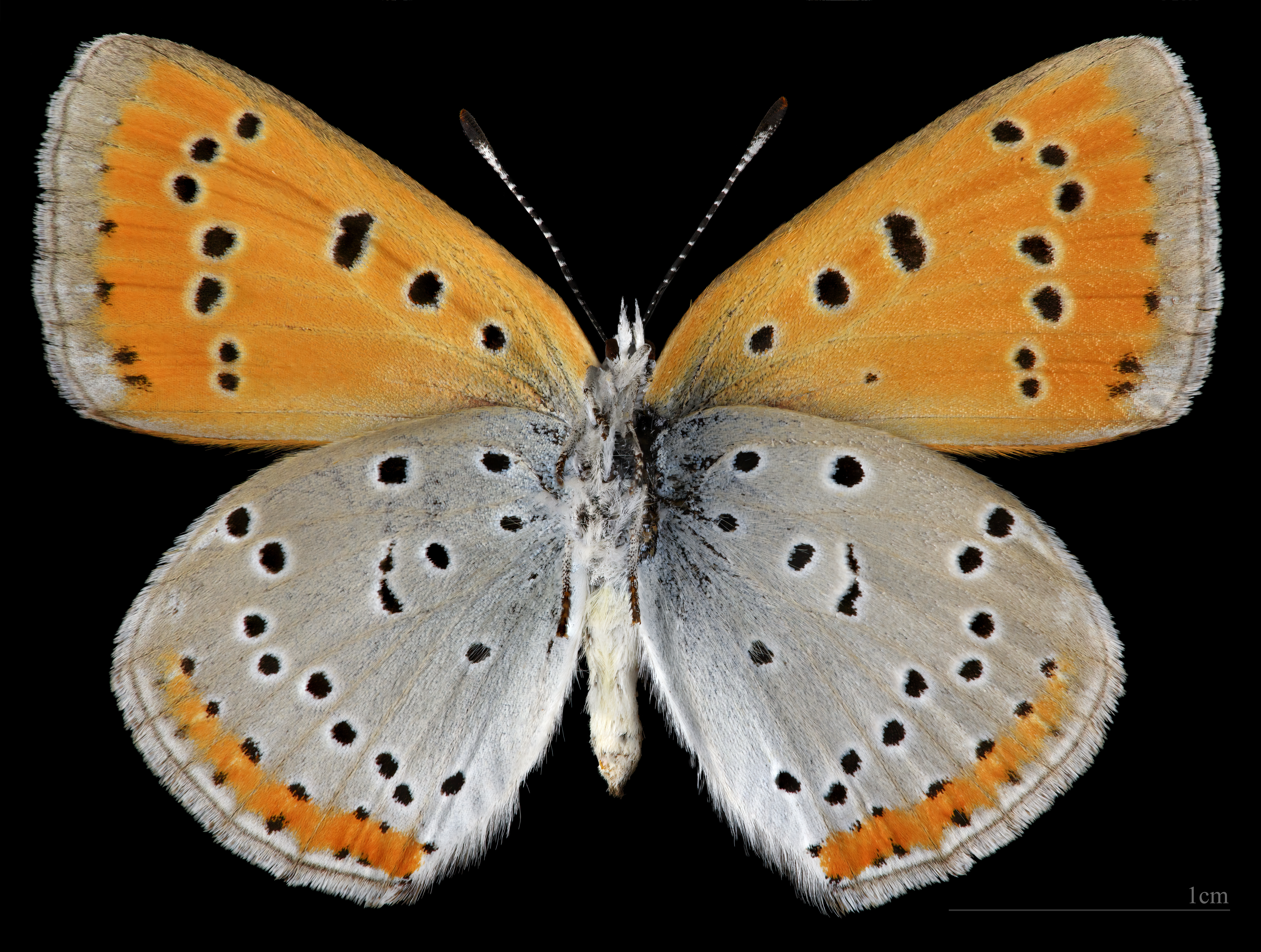
Lycaena dispar ♀ △

== Subspecies ==
- †L. d. dispar (Haworth, 1802) – England – extinct since 1864
- L. d. batavus (Oberthür, 1923) – Netherlands
- L. d. rutilus (Werneberg, 1864) – Central and southern Europe, Caucasus, Transcaucasia
- L. d. festiva Krulikowsky, 1909 – Ural, western Siberia
- L. d. dahurica (Graeser, 1888) – Transbaikalia, western Amur
- L. d. aurata Leech, 1887 – Siberia, eastern Amur, Ussuri
- L. d. borodowskyi Grum-Grshimailo, 1900 – Manchuria

=== Genetic diversity and phylogeography ===
European populations show distinct genetic structuring based on mitochondrial DNA analysis. A 2004 study identified ten distinct haplotypes across the continent, with populations from northern and central regions sharing close genetic relationships. This pattern indicates these populations likely descended from ancestors that recolonized northward from south-eastern European refugia following the last glacial period. Geographic analysis reveals that range expansion events have been the primary driver shaping current genetic distribution patterns.

== Distribution and populations ==
=== Current range ===
Lycaena dispar occurs between latitudes 40° and 60° across Eurasia. The species is currently found in: Armenia, Austria, Azerbaijan, Belarus, Belgium, Bulgaria, China, Croatia, Czech Republic, Estonia, Finland, France, Georgia, Germany, Greece, Hungary, Italy, Kazakhstan, Republic of Korea, Latvia, Lithuania, Luxembourg, Moldova, Mongolia, Montenegro, Netherlands, Poland, Russian Federation, Serbia, Slovakia, Slovenia, Switzerland, Türkiye, Ukraine and Uzbekistan.

The species shows contrasting population trends across its range: severe decline in north-western Europe, stability or expansion in central and northern Europe, and mixed status in Asia.

=== Regional variations ===
==== Western Europe ====
The species is regionally extinct in the United Kingdom (since 1864) and Ireland (failed reintroductions). In the Netherlands, populations of L. d. batavus persist and are largely monophagous on R. hydrolapathum. Western European populations have suffered from extensive drainage of wetland habitats. In Luxembourg, monitoring from 2007 to 2015 documented the species at 183 sites across 33 municipalities in the south-west and west of the country. Populations primarily utilize R. obtusifolius and R. crispus as host plants and correlate with grassland distribution and habitat mosaics.

==== Northern Europe ====
Estonia represents the species' northern range expansion. Absent until the 20th century, L. dispar was first recorded near Tartu in 1947. The species has since expanded north-westward and achieved widespread status, though it remains absent from Estonia's western islands. Estonian populations are univoltine (single-brooded) with flight period from late June to late July, and utilize primarily R. crispus and R. obtusifolius as host plants.

==== Central Europe ====
In central Europe, L. dispar has adapted to a broader range of habitats including drier areas, fallows and urban wetlands. Populations in Germany and Austria are characteristically oligophagous on various Rumex species. Vienna's urban populations demonstrate successful colonization of anthropogenic habitats: a 2012 study documented 2,457 eggs at 23 sites within the municipality. In Croatia's Zagorje region, populations remain locally numerous but are declining due to invasive plants.

==== Southern Europe ====
The species' range extends south to Mount Olympus in Greece, where it was observed in July 2011. Southern populations may produce a partial third generation in favourable conditions.

==== Eastern Asia ====
Field monitoring in South Korea demonstrated significant range expansion southward from the species' previously known north-western strongholds. The 2024 study documented populations at 15 sites spanning six provinces. Genetic diversity patterns, combined with field observations, demonstrate that South Korean populations maintain strong connectivity and are not experiencing the isolation previously assumed. These findings led researchers to recommend downgrading the species from its Near Threatened status in South Korea.

== Ecology ==
=== Habitat requirements ===
Lycaena dispar is primarily a wetland species, though habitat preferences vary geographically. The species prefers undisturbed grasslands along riverbanks and stream banks, particularly areas with its larval food plants. To avoid flooding mortality, L. dispar often utilizes plants growing away from water edges and among reed-fen vegetation.

The butterfly shows preference for warmer microclimates which allow faster larval development. Agricultural disturbance, particularly mowing shortly after egg-laying, causes catastrophic population losses by destroying eggs and depriving larvae of food plants.

=== Host plants ===
The large copper utilizes various dock species (Rumex) as larval host plants. Host plant range varies geographically, with broader usage in eastern populations and narrower specialization in western ones. Female butterflies select host plants based on multiple factors: plant height, size, phenological stage, absence of flowering/fruiting stems and low acidity levels.

Primary host plants vary by region:

- Rumex crispus – most widely used species; preferred in south-western Germany, Austria and Estonia; dominant host in urban Vienna where it harboured 87.6% of all eggs (4.4 eggs/plant)
- R. hydrolapathum – specialization in north-western range (formerly England, Netherlands, Poland, northern Germany), where populations are most threatened; monophagous preference in (England and) the Netherlands
- R. obtusifolius – preferred in south-western France and Estonia; second-ranked host in Vienna (1.1 eggs/plant); co-primary host with R. crispus in Luxembourg

Additional confirmed host plants include R. aquaticus, R. conglomeratus, R. patientia, R. sanguineus and R. stenophyllus. The latter two species represent novel host plant records documented in urban environments. Sorrel species containing oxalic acid (e.g. Rumex acetosa) are rarely utilized.

Larvae create a characteristic feeding pattern on host plants, eating only the underside of leaves to produce a 'window' effect where the upper leaf surface remains intact.

=== Life cycle ===
Most European populations are bivoltine with two generations annually: May–June and late July–early September, with peak flight in July. Northern populations (e.g. Estonia) are univoltine, while southern populations may produce a partial third generation.

The species overwinters as half-grown third-instar larvae, which enter diapause triggered by temperatures below 15°C and photoperiod cues. Larvae resume feeding in early May when temperatures exceed 25°C. Heavy mortality occurs during the overwintering period, particularly from prolonged flooding.

=== Reproduction and development ===
Females produce approximately 32 eggs per batch and can lay around 714 eggs in their lifetime. Eggs are laid on sunny host plants in optimal microclimates. Herbivore damage and fungal infections on host plants do not significantly affect oviposition choices.

In late June, mature larvae migrate up to 25 cm from their host plant and approximately 10 cm above ground to pupate. During this migration, larvae change color from bright green to pale yellow-brown for camouflage. Pupation lasts 10–14 days.

=== Natural enemies ===
Mortality factors include invertebrate predators (particularly during pre-diapause), parasitoids and vertebrate predators including reed-nesting birds, amphibians and small mammals.

The ichneumonid wasp Hyposoter placidus has been recorded as a specialized parasitoid of L. dispar. First documented in Poland in 2021, adult wasps were reared from caterpillars collected in north-eastern Poland feeding on Rumex confertus, R. hydrolapathum and R. obtusifolius. This parasitoid may be a factor limiting abundance of L. dispar populations.

Other parasitoids include Phryxe vulgaris (Diptera: Tachinidae), which affects post-diapause larvae and results in death of late instar larvae.

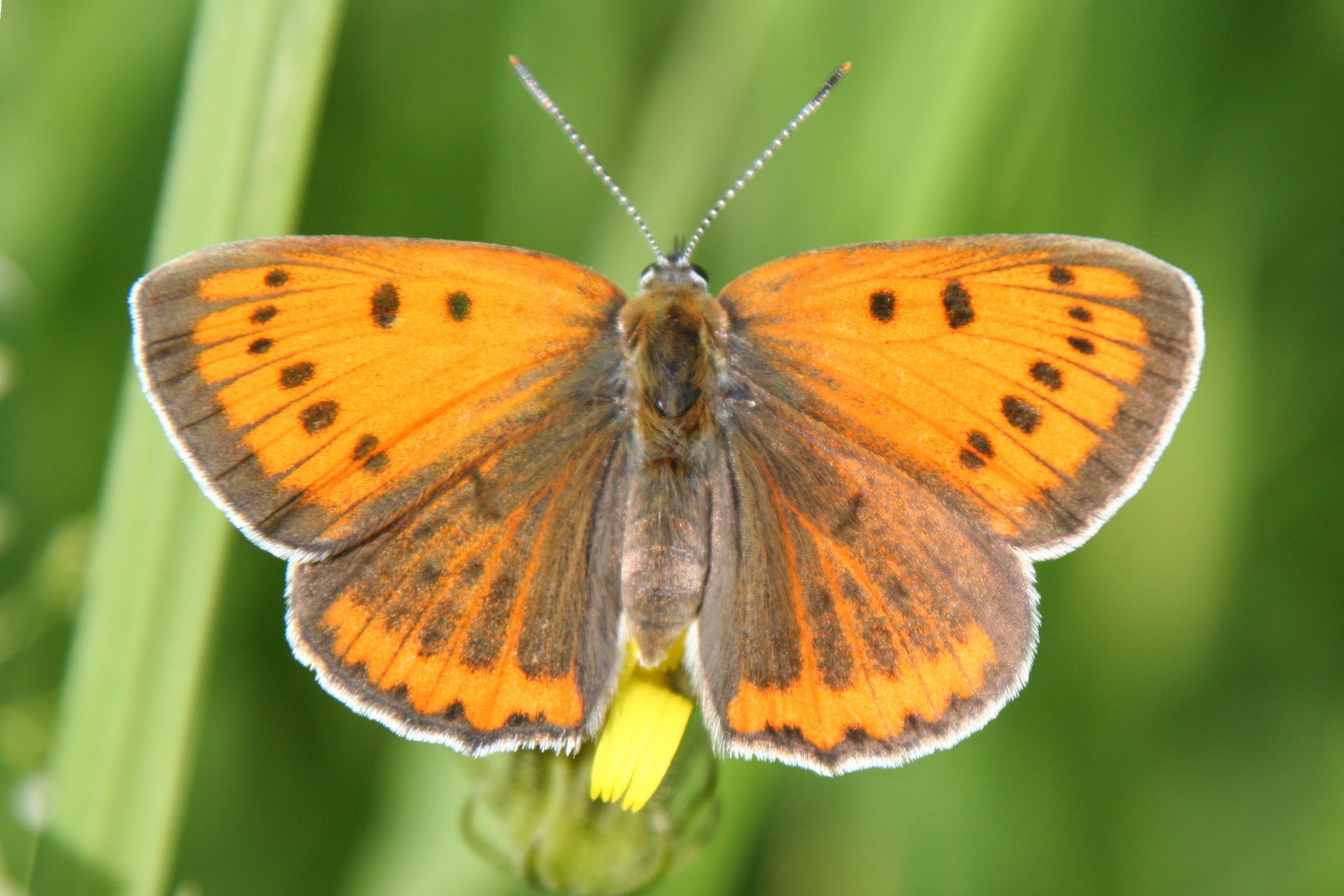
Female large copper

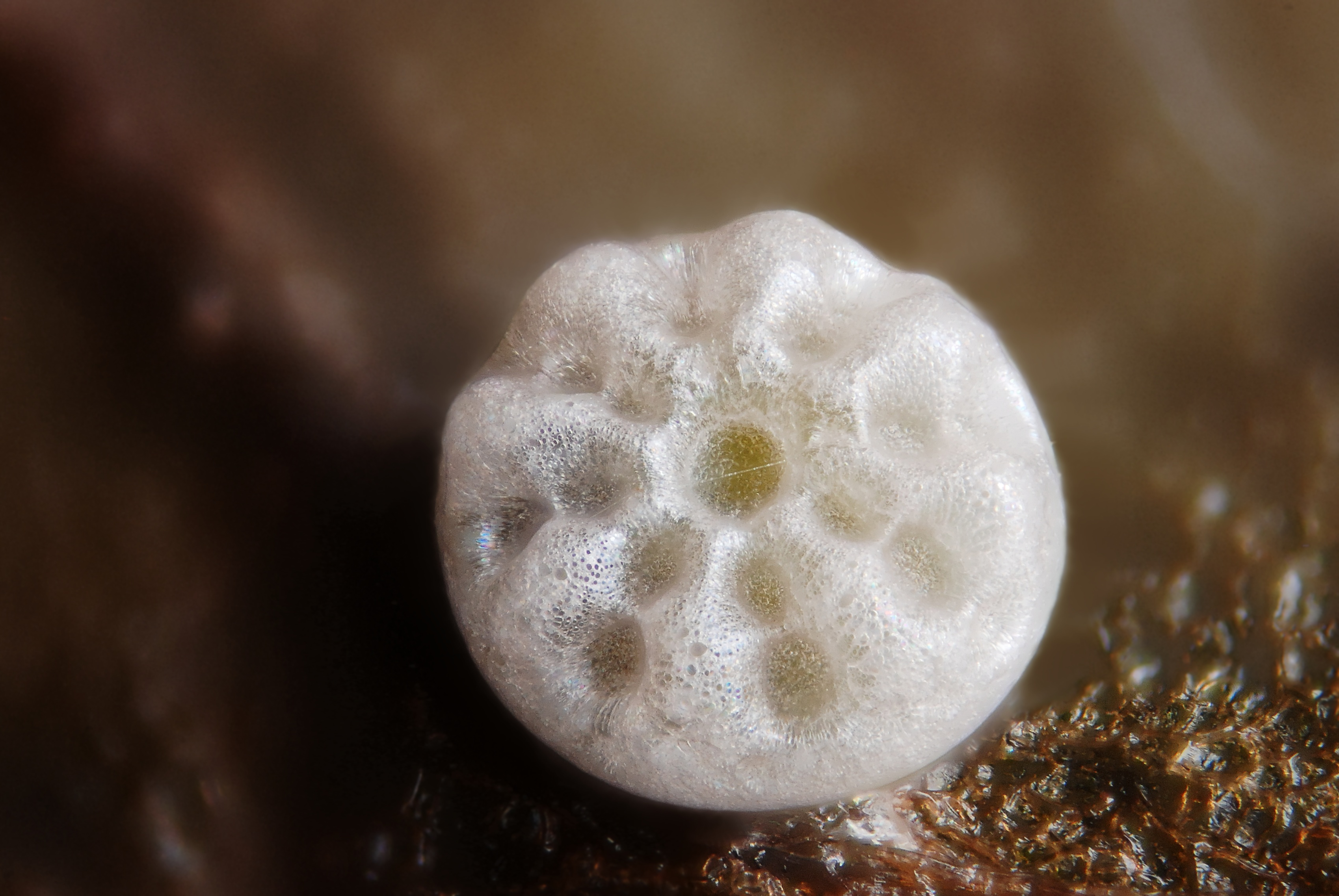
Egg of L. dispar

== History in Britain and Ireland ==
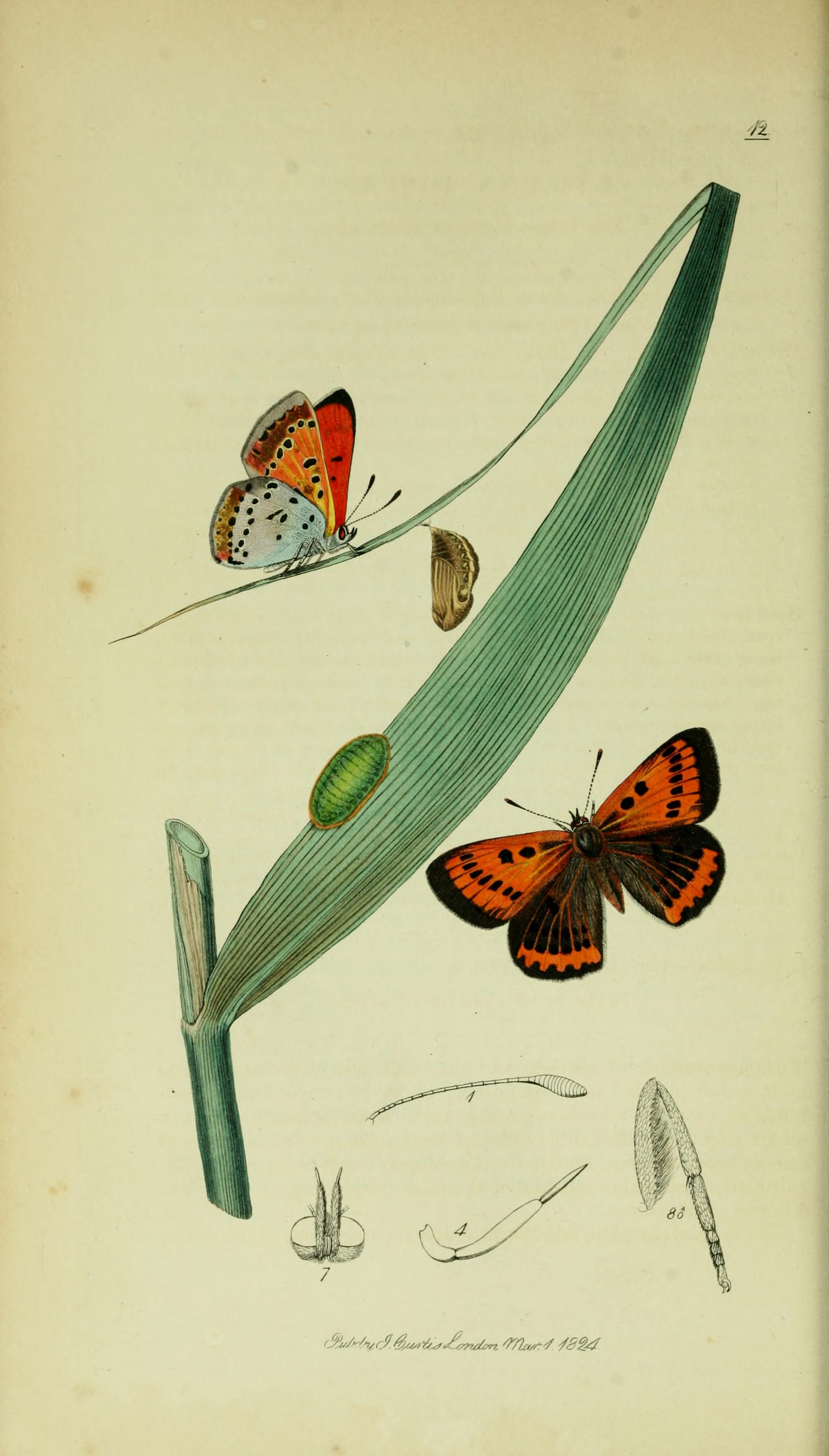
Illustration from John Curtis's British Entomology Volume 5

=== Extinction in England ===
The British subspecies, L. d. dispar, was first recorded from the Huntingdonshire fens in 1749 and formally described in 1759. The butterfly was once common in several English fenland localities including Whittlesea Mere, using food-plant Rumex hydrolapathum.

Drainage of the fens for agriculture led to rapid population decline:

- 1820: 50+ specimens could be collected easily; market price 3-4 shillings per dozen
- 1845: Rapid decrease noted in Cambridgeshire
- 1847: Last five specimens caught in Huntingdonshire
- 1864: Species declared extinct in Britain.

The value of specimens increased dramatically post-extinction:

- 1870s: 20 shillings per specimen
- 1893: London auction averaged 90 shillings per specimen (31 specimens sold for £139)
- 1902: Average £5 per specimen, with one female fetching £7.

=== Reintroduction attempts ===
Multiple reintroduction attempts have been made:

- 1909: G. H. Verbal released caterpillars of L. d. rutilus at Wicken Fen, Cambridgeshire – failed due to lack of suitable host plants
- 1913: Edward Bagwell Purefoy established L. d. rutilus colony in Tipperary, Ireland – temporarily successful
- 1926: First attempt to establish Dutch subspecies L. d. batavus in the British Isles, by Purefoy at the same site in Tipperary as the ultimately failed 1913 establishment – the colony survived 11 or 12 years
- 1927: First of several attempts to establish L. d. batavus at Woodwalton Fen, the most successful site of reintroduction; this first attempt was aided by caging of caterpillars over winter and numerous topups from captive stock; in 1969, remaining animals were taken (back) into captivity
- Various subsequent attempts in Britain and Ireland – all ultimately failed.

Failures are attributed to captive-bred stock being poorly adapted to wild conditions. The Dutch subspecies L. d. batavus, described in 1915 and nearly identical to the extinct English form, has been used in reintroduction attempts without lasting success.

== Conservation ==
Lycaena dispar is classified as Near Threatened by the IUCN, though regional status varies considerably. The species is protected under the Bern Convention on the Conservation of European Wildlife and Natural Habitats and EU Habitats Directive (Annexes II and IV).

Primary threats include:

- Wetland drainage for agriculture
- Intensive grassland management (particularly mowing during breeding season)
- Development on riverbanks and floodplains
- Climate sensitivity affecting larval development
- Habitat fragmentation isolating populations.

Conservation recommendations include:

- Maintaining habitat heterogeneity with diverse mowing regimes
- Protecting and restoring wetland habitats
- Research into improving survival of captive-reared individuals for reintroduction
- Consideration of reintroduction to extensive restored habitats such as the Great Fen project and Norfolk Broads.

The contrasting population trends across Europe – decline in the west, expansion in the north and east – suggest the species may be responding to climate change as well as habitat availability.
