= Great Island of Cenad =

- IUCN category IV (habitat/species management area)
- Location within Romania
- Location: Cenad, Timiș County, Romania
- Coordinates: 46°8′36″N 20°39′51″E
- Area: 3 ha (7.4 acres)
- Established: 1995, 2000
- Administrator: ELH Arad

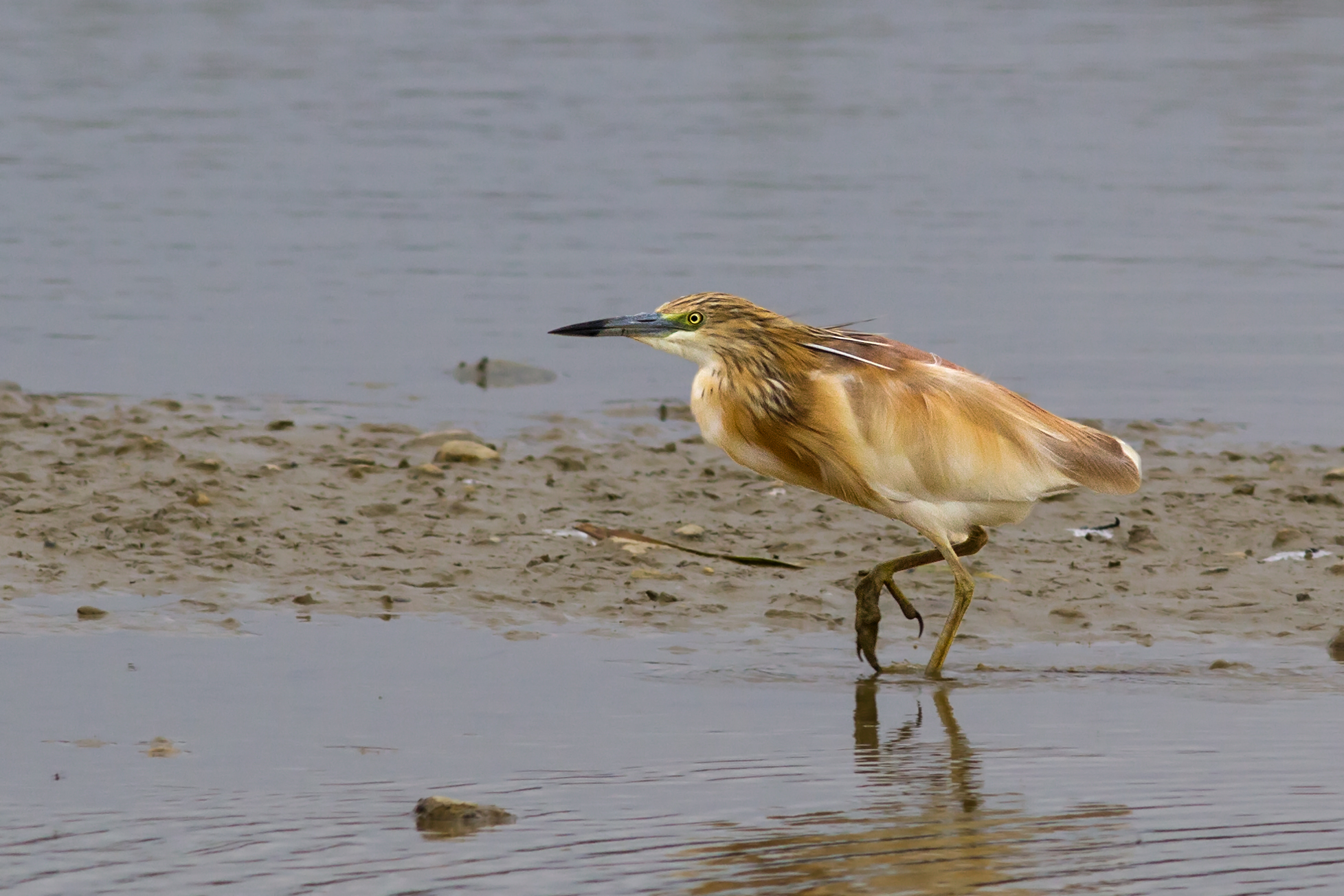
Squacco heron

The Great Island of Cenad is a nationally protected area classified as an IUCN Category IV mixed nature reserve, situated in Timiș County within the administrative boundaries of Cenad commune. Along with Cenad Forest and Igriș Islands, it is part of the Mureș Floodplain Natural Park.

== Location ==
The natural area, covering 3 hectares, is situated in the northwesternmost part of Timiș County, bordering Arad County and close to the Hungarian border. It lies within the right floodplain of the Mureș River, to the east of the village of Cenad and north of the town of Sânnicolau Mare.

== Description ==
The Great Island of Cenad was designated as a protected area under Law No. 5 of March 6, 2000. It constitutes a natural zone characterized by an island, a water body, and an alluvial meadow composed of sands and gravel deposits overlying clayey banks, supporting flora and fauna typical of wetland ecosystems.

=== Biodiversity ===
The natural area supports a diverse range of arboreal vegetation, including willow and poplar, as well as grassy steppe vegetation. It offers essential nesting, feeding, and habitat conditions for various species of migratory and transient birds.

Several bird species have been recorded within the reserve, including the purple heron (Ardea purpurea), grey heron (Ardea cinerea), squacco heron (Ardeola ralloides), night heron (Nycticorax nycticorax), great egret (Ardea alba), black stork (Ciconia nigra), white stork (Ciconia ciconia), great cormorant (Phalacrocorax carbo), red-throated loon (Gavia stellata), as well as various species of wild ducks and geese.
