= Norfolk Roadside Nature Reserve =

Protected roadside verges in Norfolk, England

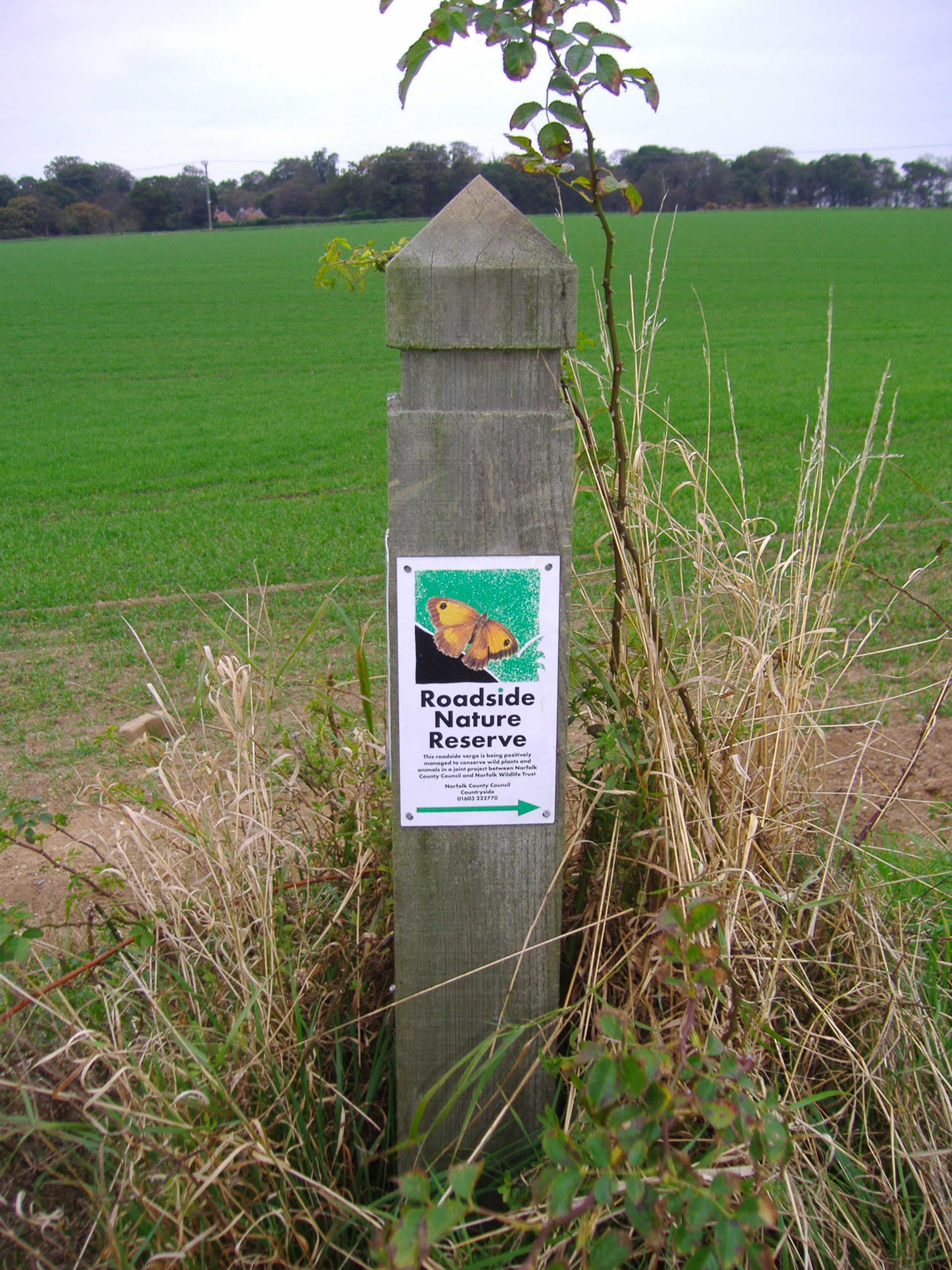
Roadside marker post for one of the 67 reserves, this one is near Metton.

Norfolk Roadside Nature Reserve is a scheme which was set up in the mid-1990s by collaboration between the Norfolk County Council and the Norfolk Wildlife Trust. The aim of this scheme is to protect and promote the verges of Norfolk's roadside, that contain rare and scarce plant and insect species. Many of Norfolk's roadside verges have survived modern road improvements and as such are remnants of the natural grassland habitats that were once common and widespread in the British Isles. As of 2025, there are currently 300 such sites around the Norfolk countryside, but more are added each year. Once each year every Roadside Nature Reserve is surveyed and recorded by a dedicated group of volunteers from the trust. Demarcation posts are sited at each end of the Reserves.

== The verges ==
Many of the reserves can be found on roads that were laid down centuries ago and their routes have changed very little. In the past, farmers and local people would use the verges to crop hay to feed their animals, who were also grazed on these verges as they were moved around the countryside. These practices produced a rich, bio-diverse grassland, that still exists on these verges.

== Plants and wildlife ==
Some of the more unusual flora that can be found on these reserves are such plants as:

- Purple broomrape (Orobanche purpurea)
- Breckland speedwell (Veronica praecox)
- Crested cow-wheat (Melampyrum cristatum)
- Sand catchfly (Silene conica)
- Fragrant agrimony (Agrimonia procera)
- Adderstongue fern (Ophioglossum vulgatum)
- Dyer's greenweed (Genista tinctoria)
- Pepper saxifrage (Silaum silaus)
- Sulphur clover (Trifolium ochroleucon)
- Pyramidal orchid (Anacamptis pyramidalis)

There are also rare fungi to be found such as Sandy Stilt puffball (Battarrea phalloides).The reserves also are used as conduits for many species and make ideal hunting grounds they are used by such species such as:

- Bats,
- Harriers,
- Owls,
- Stoats,
- Weasels,

In the summer months butterflies and moths are attracted to the sites.

== Gallery ==
Rare Plants

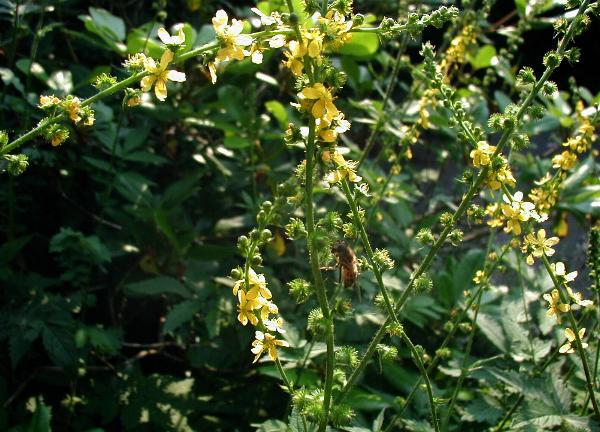
Fragrant agrimony.

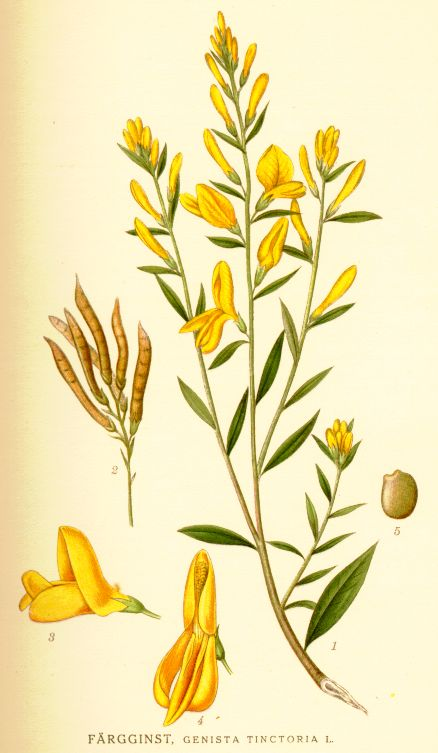
Dyer's greenweed

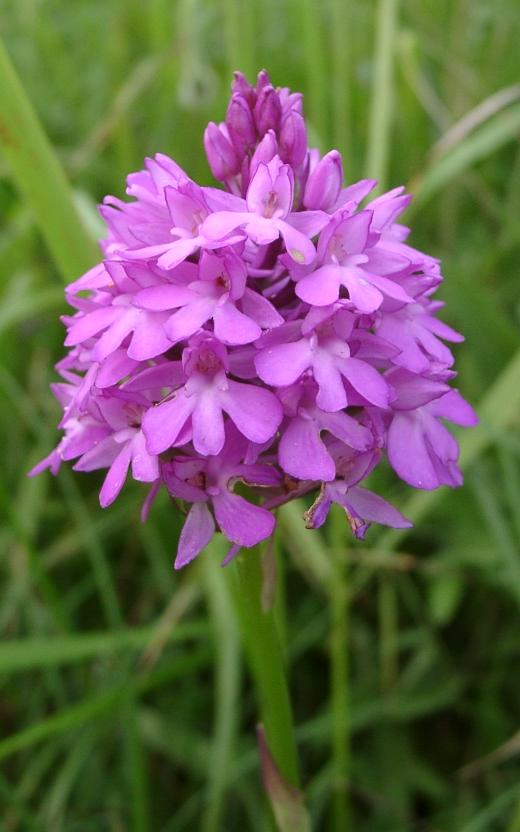
Pyramidal Orchid

Other Species

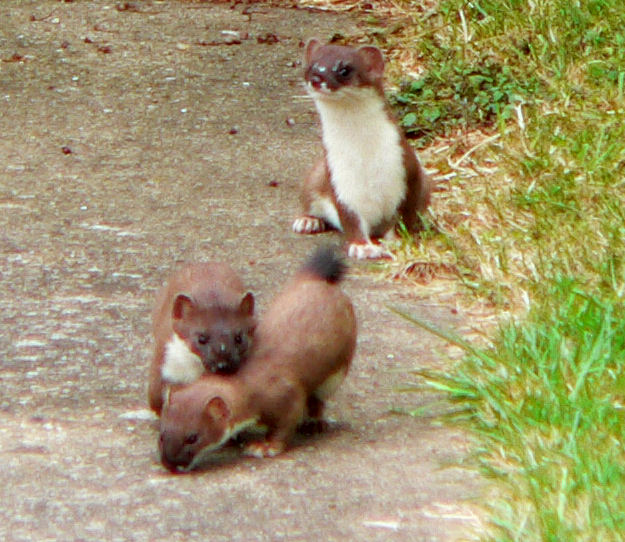
Stoat

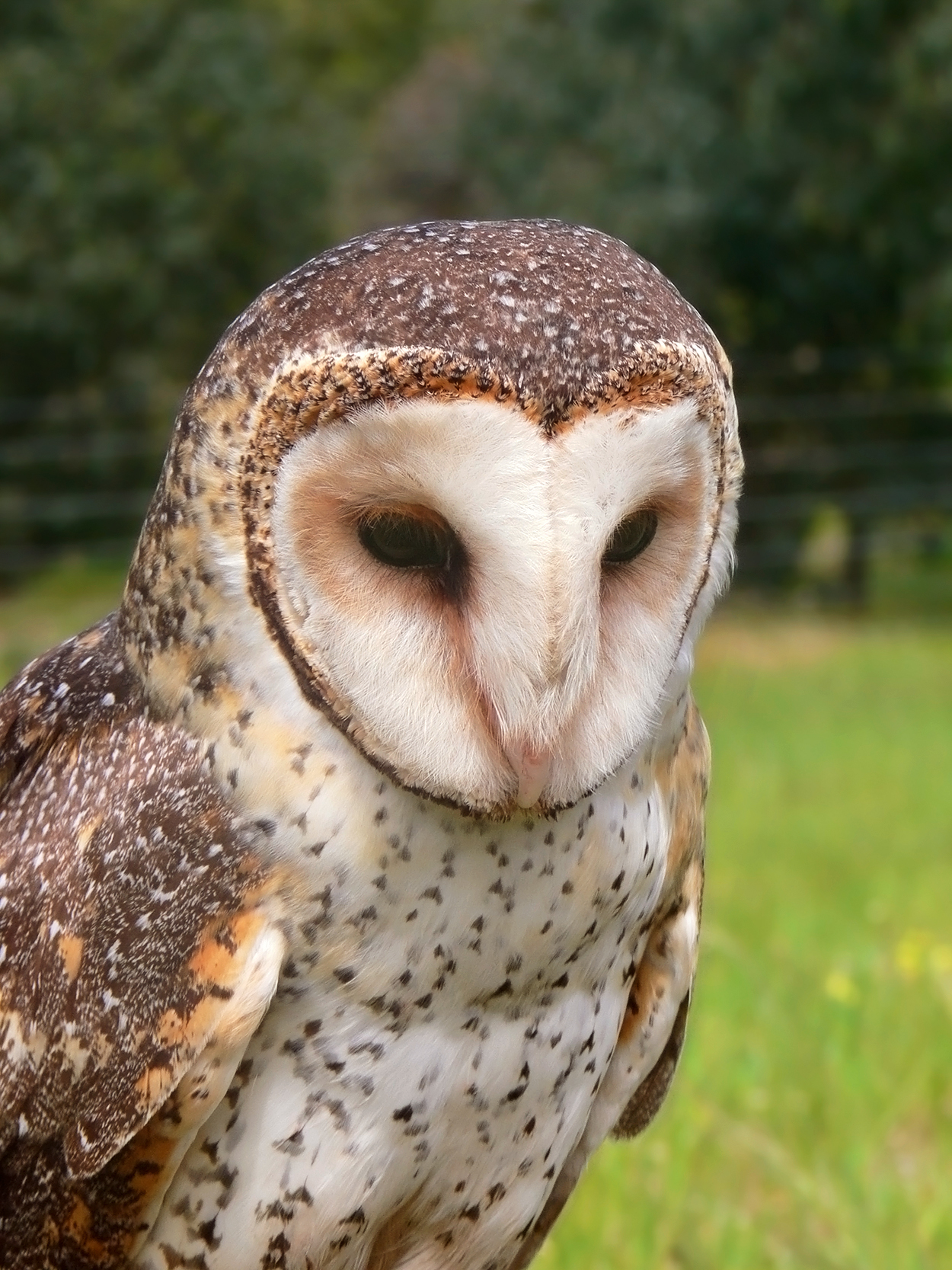
Barn Owl

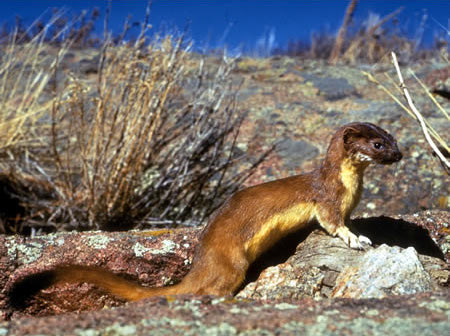
Weasle

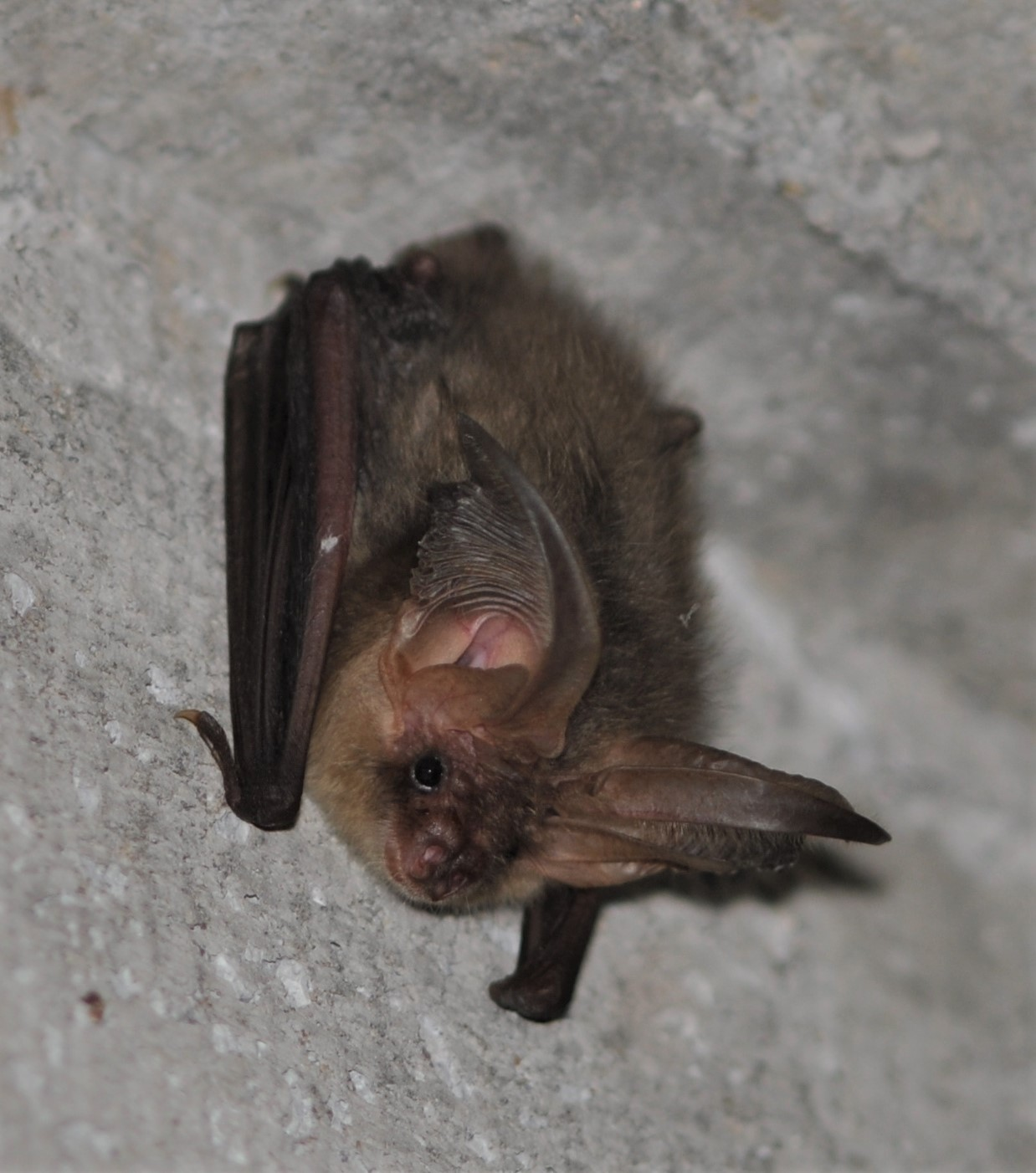
Long-eared Bat

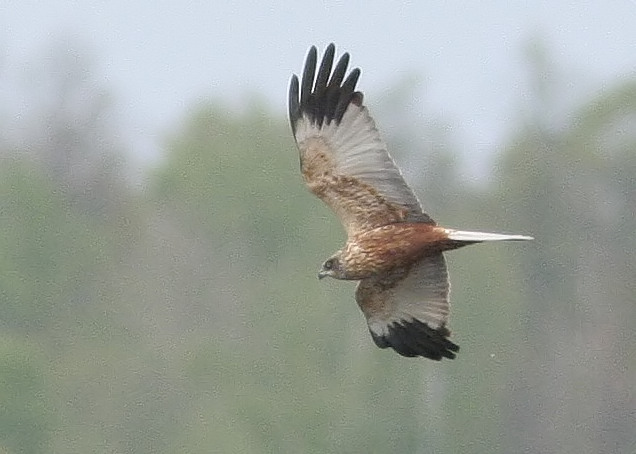
Marsh Harrier

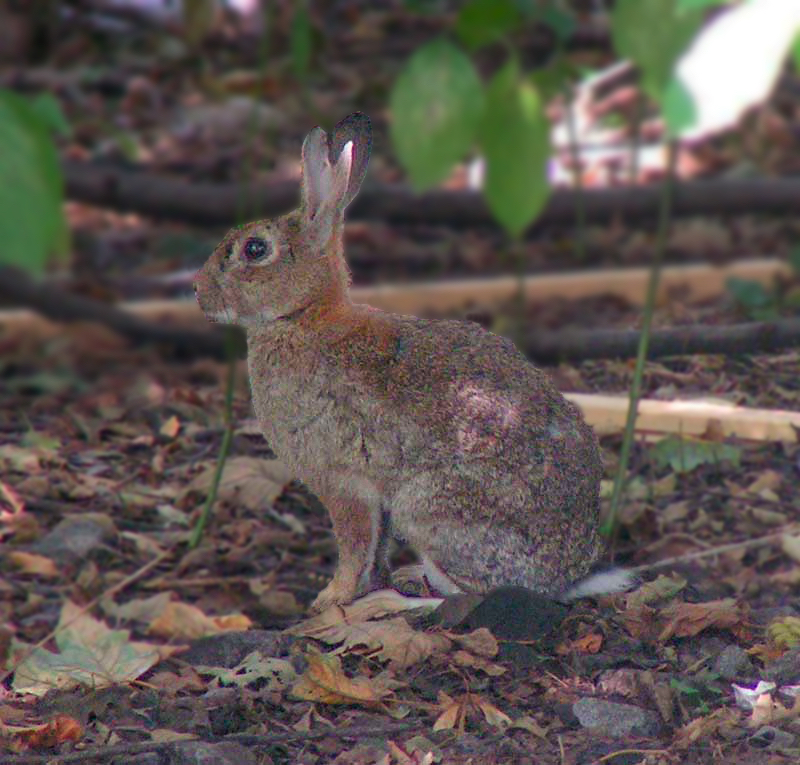
Rabbit

== The Locations ==
Norfolk Roadside Nature Reserve
Norfolk Wildlife Trust
marker post	Location	Map Ref	Notes	Marker post
	Sustead to Felbrigg Lane	TG186376		
	Cromer to Metton lane	TG208303		
	A148 East of Hillington	TF739259		
	Sherbourne Road between Dersingham and Fring.	TF707315	A long chalk verge with calamint, ox-eye daisy	
	Church Lane, Wood Dalling.	TG083267	A large population of early purple orchids, four kinds of sedge, primroses. Best in early May.	
	Hurth Way / Rosecroft Way, Thetford			
	Green Lane, Thetford			
