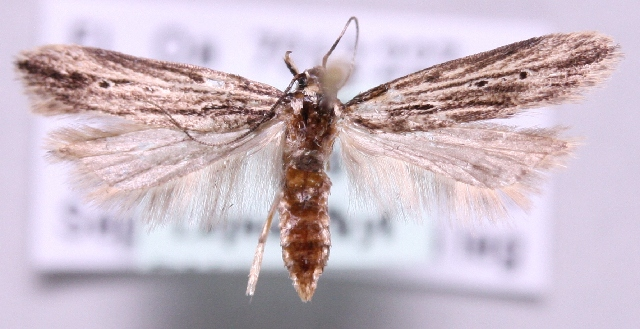

Scientific classification
- Domain: Eukaryota
- Kingdom: Animalia
- Phylum: Arthropoda
- Class: Insecta
- Order: Lepidoptera
- Family: Gelechiidae
- Genus: Monochroa
- Species: M. palustrellus

Binomial name
- Monochroa palustrellus (Douglas, 1850)

Synonyms
- Ypsolopus palustrellus Douglas, 1850; Monochroa palustrella; Catabrachmia rozsikella Rebel, 1909

= Monochroa palustrellus =

Species of moth

Monochroa palustrellus, the wainscot neb, is a moth of the family Gelechiidae. It is found in from western, central and northern Europe to the Ural Mountains and southern Siberia. The habitat consists of waste ground, dry pastures and sand-dunes.

The wingspan is 17–19 mm. The forewings pale brown, veins more or less marked with whitish streaks, interneural spaces mixed with blackish; stigmata blackish, whitish-edged, plical and first discal elongate, second discal roundish. Hindwings light grey.

Adults are on wing from late June to August in one generation per year.

The larvae feed on Rumex species, including Rumex crispus, Rumex aquaticus and Rumex hydrolapathum.
