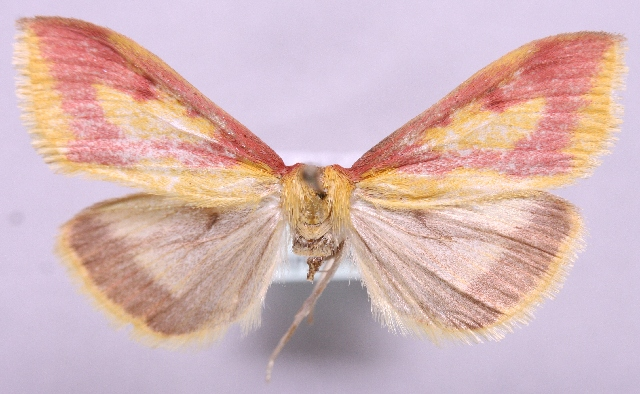

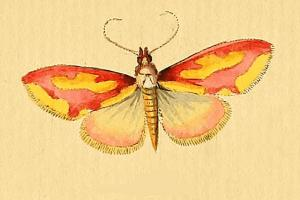

Scientific classification
- Kingdom: Animalia
- Phylum: Arthropoda
- Clade: Pancrustacea
- Class: Insecta
- Order: Lepidoptera
- Family: Crambidae
- Genus: Ostrinia
- Species: O. palustralis

Binomial name
- Ostrinia palustralis (Hübner, 1796)

Synonyms
- Pyralis palustralis Hubner, 1796; Ostrinia palustralis baikalensis Mutuura & Munroe, 1970; Pyrausta palustralis eversmanni Caradja, 1916; Ebulea palustralis memnialis Walker, 1859; Pyrausta palustralis infascialis Caradja, 1925; Phalaena Noctua carneola Esper, 1805; Ostrinia palustralis raddealis Mutuura & Munroe, 1970; Pyrausta palustralis var. amurensis Caradja, 1916

= Ostrinia palustralis =

Species of moth

Ostrinia palustralis is a species of moth in the family Crambidae described by Jacob Hübner in 1796. It has a trans-Palearctic distribution. In Europe, it is found from Sweden south to Italy and east through eastern Europe to Russia. However, it is absent from the western part of the Balkan Peninsula.

The wingspan is 29–42 mm.

The larvae feed on Rumex species, including Rumex hydrolapathum and Rumex aquaticus.
