= Great Wilbraham Common =

UK common and Site of Special Scientific Interest

Coordinates: 52.195°N 0.243°E

- Site of Special Scientific Interest
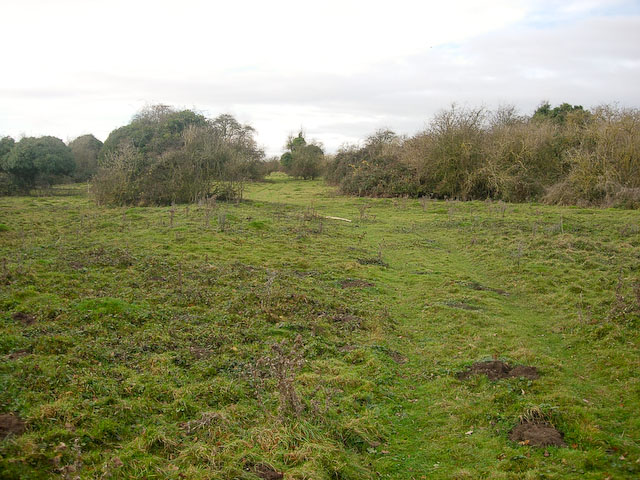
- Location of Great Wilbraham Common.
- Area of search: Cambridgeshire
- Grid reference: TL 269 713
- Interest: Biological
- Area: 23.5 hectares
- Notification date: 1983
- Location map: Magic Map

Great Wilbraham Common is a 23.5-hectare (58-acre) biological Site of Special Scientific Interest west of Great Wilbraham in Cambridgeshire. It is managed by the Commons Right Holders.

This is one of the largest remaining areas of species-rich grassland in the county. Locally uncommon flora include purple milk-vetch, felwort, meadow saxifrage, green-winged orchid and sulphur clover.

There is access by a footpath from Wilbraham Road
