= Lingwood Meadows =

Protected area in Suffolk, England

Coordinates: 52.183°N 1.094°E

- Site of Special Scientific Interest
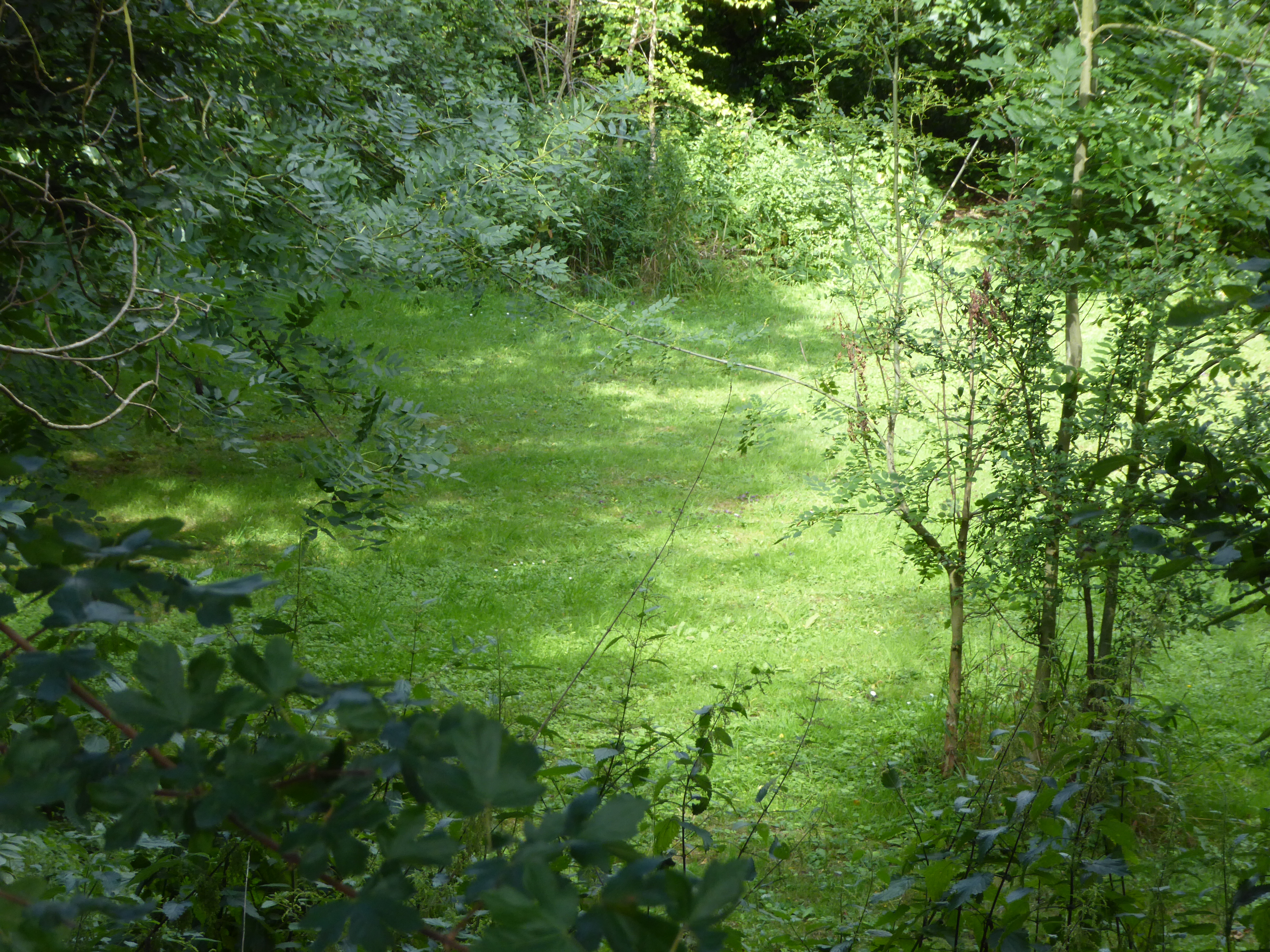
- Location of Lingwood Meadows.
- Area of search: Suffolk
- Grid reference: TM 116 584
- Interest: Biological
- Area: 2.7 hectares
- Notification date: 1993
- Location map: Magic Map

Lingwood Meadows is a 2.7-hectare (6.7-acre) biological Site of Special Scientific Interest east of Earl Stonham in Suffolk.

These ancient meadows are one of the few surviving examples of unimproved grassland in the county. They have diverse flora, and twenty grass species have been recorded with red fescue and Yorkshire fog dominant. Fifty-five other species include the nationally scarce sulphur clover.

The site is private land with no public access.
