= Igriș Islands =

Nature reserve in Romania

- IUCN category IV (habitat/species management area)
- Location within Romania
- Interactive map of Igriș Islands
- Location: Igriș (Sânpetru Mare), Timiș County, Romania
- Coordinates: 46°7′19″N 20°47′34″E
- Area: 3 ha (7.4 acres)
- Established: 1995, 2000
- Administrator: ELH Arad

The Igriș Islands are a nationally protected area classified as an IUCN Category IV avifaunal and floristic nature reserve, located in Timiș County within the administrative boundaries of Sânpetru Mare commune. The protected area comprises 11 islands, the majority of which are covered with shrubs and forest vegetation. These islands serve as important nesting and stopover sites for waterfowl. The area is included within the Mureș Floodplain Natural Park.

== Location ==
The natural area, covering 3 hectares, is situated in the northwestern extremity of Timiș County, near the border with Arad County and in close proximity to the Hungarian border. It lies within the right floodplain of the Mureș River, northeast of the village of Sânpetru Mare, and is part of the Mureș Floodplain Natural Park.

== Description ==
The nature reserve was designated as a protected area under Law No. 5 of March 6, 2000. It comprises 11 islands, a water body, and alluvial meadows consisting of sand and gravel deposits over lacustrine clay loams. The area supports a mix of grassy and arboreal vegetation, including willow and poplar species, as well as wetland-specific fauna such as mammals, birds, fish, reptiles, and insects.

=== Avifauna ===
The protected natural area offers suitable conditions for shelter, nesting, and feeding for various migratory bird species, including several rare ones. Notable species include the little egret (Egretta garzetta), grey heron (Ardea cinerea), purple heron (Ardea purpurea), squacco heron (Ardeola ralloides), night heron (Nycticorax nycticorax), great cormorant (Phalacrocorax carbo), red-throated loon (Gavia stellata), and black stork (Ciconia nigra).
