= Calepina =

Scientific classification
- Kingdom: Plantae
- Clade: Embryophytes
- Clade: Tracheophytes
- Clade: Spermatophytes
- Clade: Angiosperms
- Clade: Eudicots
- Clade: Rosids
- Order: Brassicales
- Family: Brassicaceae
- Genus: Calepina; Adans.
- Species: C. irregularis

Binomial name
- Calepina irregularis (Asso) Thell.

Synonyms
- Synonymy: Bunias cochlearioides Willd.; Calepina cochlearioides (Pers.) Dumort.; Calepina corvini (All.) Desv.; Calepina ruellii Bubani; Cheiranthus auriculatus (Lam.) Lapeyr.; Cochlearia auriculata Lam.; Cochlearia lyrata Sm.; Cochlearia saxatilis f. auriculata (Lam.) Bolzon; Crambe amplexicaulis Banks & Sol.; Crambe bursifolia L'Hér. ex DC.; Crambe corvini All.; Crucifera corvini (All.) E.H.L.Krause; Kernera auriculata (Lam.) Sweet; Kernera saxatilis proles auriculata (Lam.) Rouy & Foucaud; Laelia cochlearioides Pers.; Laelia corvini (All.) Samp.; Laelia iberioides Pers.; Laelia irregularis (Asso) Samp.; Myagrum bursifolium Thuill.; Myagrum erucifolium Vill.; Myagrum erucoides Pourr. ex Willk. & Lange; Myagrum iberioides Brot.; Myagrum irregulare Asso (1779) (basionym); Rapistrum bursifolium Bergeret

Genus of flowering plants

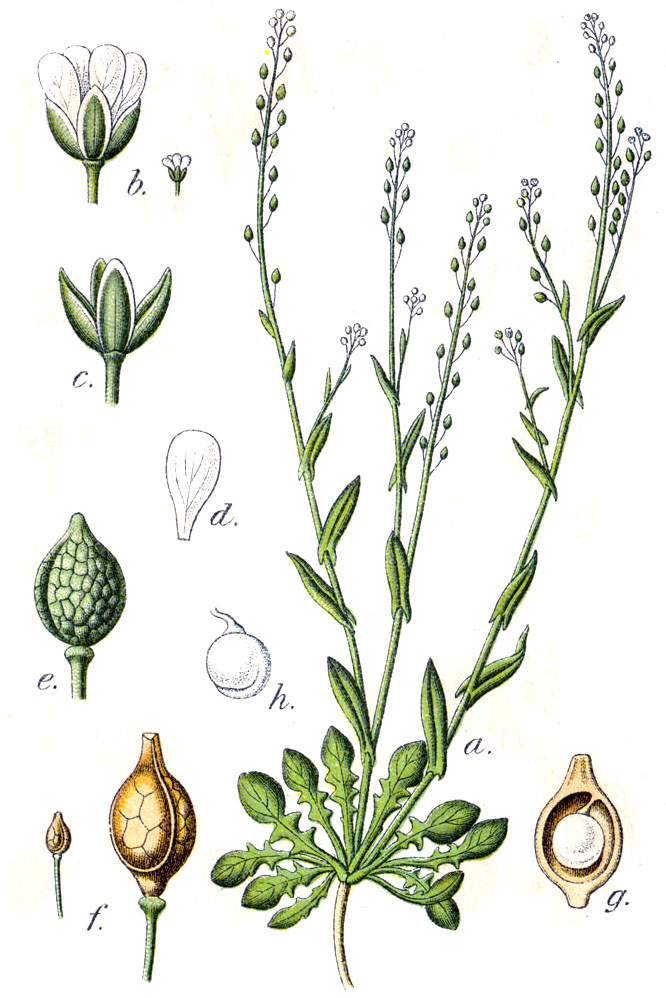
Botanical illustration of Calepina irregularis

Calepina is a genus of flowering plants belonging to the family Brassicaceae. It includes a single species, Calepina irregularis, an annual native to Mediterranean Europe, northwestern Africa, Western Asia to Iran and Turkmenistan, the Caucasus, and southern European Russia.
