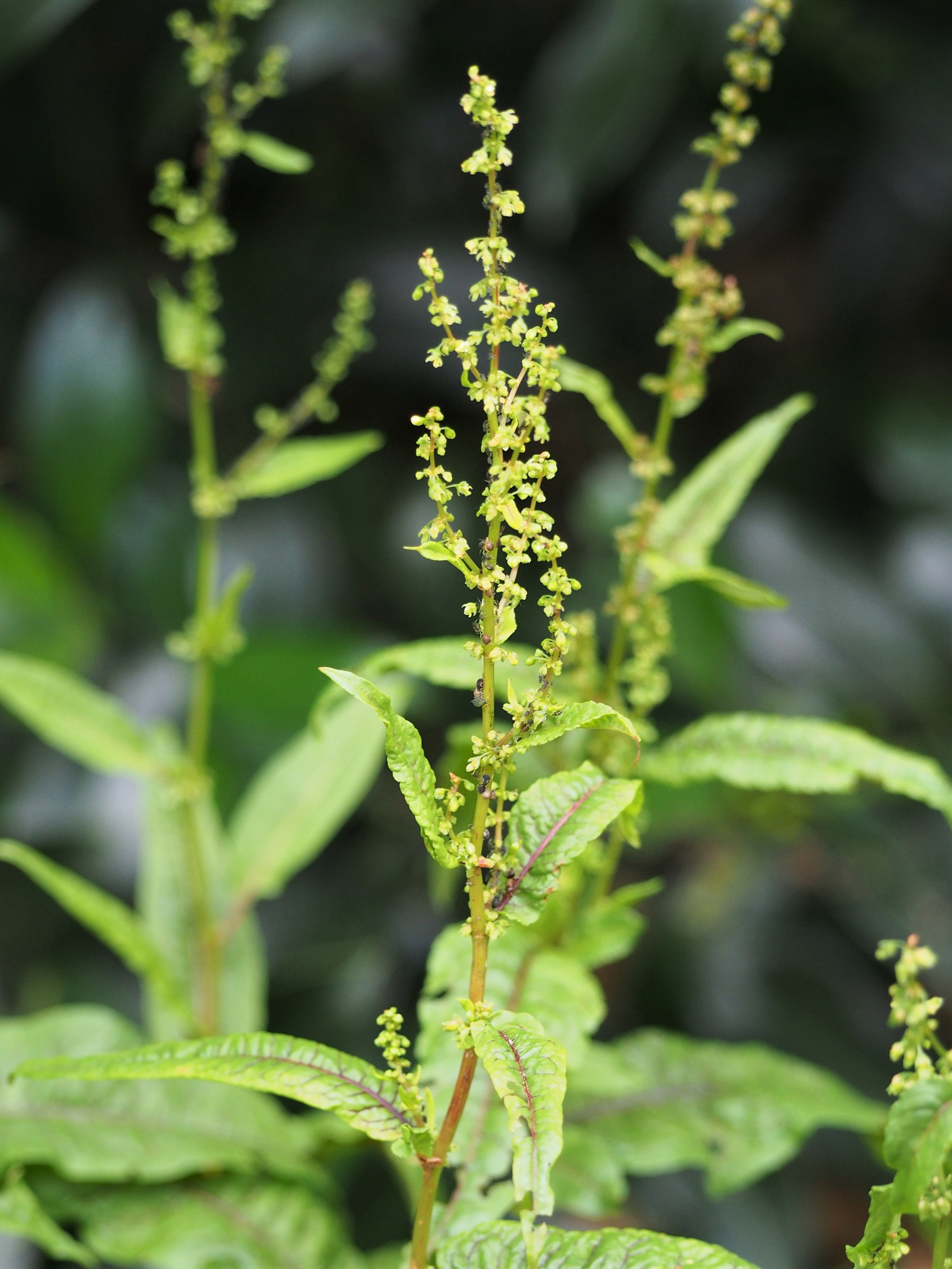

Scientific classification
- Kingdom: Plantae
- Clade: Embryophytes
- Clade: Tracheophytes
- Clade: Spermatophytes
- Clade: Angiosperms
- Clade: Eudicots
- Order: Caryophyllales
- Family: Polygonaceae
- Genus: Rumex
- Species: R. sanguineus

Binomial name
- Rumex sanguineus L.

= Rumex sanguineus =

Species of flowering plant

Rumex sanguineus, commonly known as wood dock, bloody dock or red-veined dock, is a perennial flowering plant species in the family Polygonaceae. Rumex sanguineus is a dicot and can be observed in Europe with at least two varieties.

== Description ==
In var sanguineus (red-veined or bloody dock) the leaf veins are bright red, and in var viridis (wood dock) the whole leaf is green. The leaf blade is lanceolate with a more or less pointed tip, and averages 10 to 30 cm (3.9 to 11.8 in) long by 2.5 to 6 cm (0.98 to 2.36 in) wide. Rumex sanguineus grows in shaded or damp habitats, and flowers in summer. The inflorescence occupies the upper two thirds of the stem. The inflorescence is lax, interrupted, and broadly paniculate. There are normally ten to twenty flowers in each well-spaced whorl. The achenes are dark reddish brown to almost black.

The red-veined form is very distinctive. The green form is distinguished from the very similar Rumex conglomeratus by a more slender and erect habit.

== Distribution ==
Rumex sanguineus is common in most of Europe south of about 60 degrees north, but not in Russia and rarely in the Mediterranean. It inhabits damp, shady places, especially in woodland. It is an agricultural weed that can be found in the vegetation surrounding arable fields. Rumex sanguineus is not native to North America with most reports of Rumex sanguineus being confused with R. conglomeratus or immature R. obtusifolius.

== Use ==
The wood dock is edible. However, as it contains antinutritive and harmful oxalic acid and its salts (oxalates), it is slightly toxic and should not be eaten in large quantities. (The contents are lower than in the related and better-known sorrel.) It is both used as a wild vegetable and cultivated, with plants and seeds being sold commercially. It contains considerable amounts of vitamin C and carotene. The (preferably young) leaves are eaten, for example, in salads. However, related species such as common sorrel and French sorrel are generally preferred for use as a vegetable. Wood dock is said to be less flavorsome and more ornamental. Since mainly the leaves are valued, the less conspicuous inflorescences are often removed early to stimulate more vigorous leaf growth and to prevent (possibly heavy) uncontrolled spreading.
