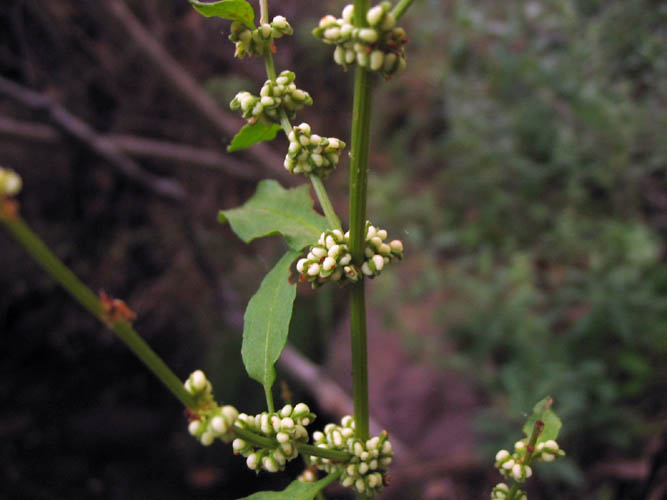

Scientific classification
- Kingdom: Plantae
- Clade: Tracheophytes
- Clade: Angiosperms
- Clade: Eudicots
- Order: Caryophyllales
- Family: Polygonaceae
- Genus: Rumex
- Species: R. conglomeratus

Binomial name
- Rumex conglomeratus Murray

= Rumex conglomeratus =

Species of flowering plant

Rumex conglomeratus, known as clustered dock and sharp dock, is a plant of the family Polygonaceae. It is an annual or biennial plant growing up to 100 cm high. A native of Europe, Asia and North Africa, it has also been introduced into North America.
