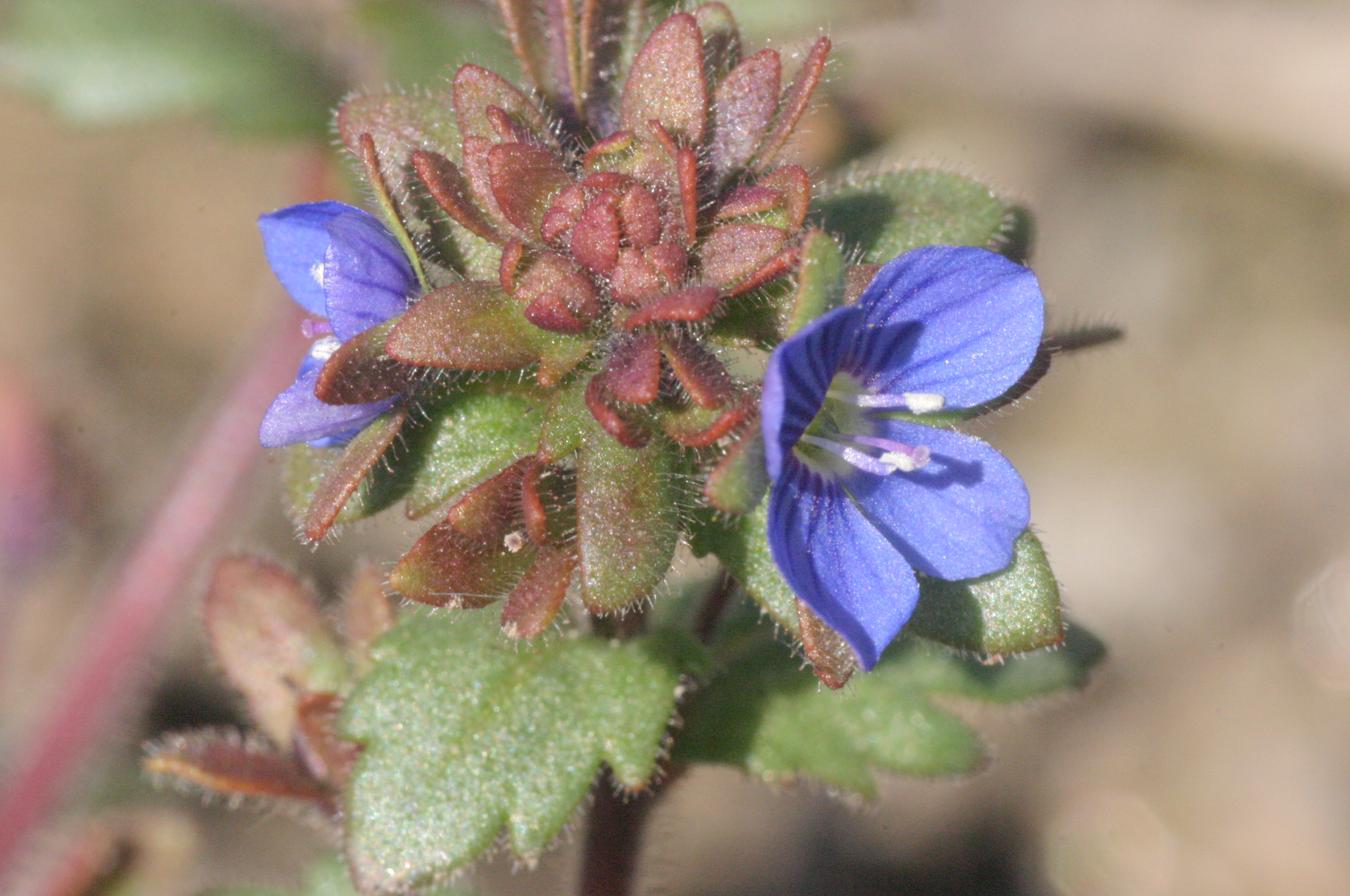

Scientific classification
- Kingdom: Plantae
- Clade: Tracheophytes
- Clade: Angiosperms
- Clade: Eudicots
- Clade: Asterids
- Order: Lamiales
- Family: Plantaginaceae
- Genus: Veronica
- Species: V. praecox

Binomial name
- Veronica praecox All.

= Veronica praecox =

Species of flowering plant in the plantain family

Veronica praecox, the breckland speedwell, is a small flower in the family Plantaginaceae native to Europe, North-West Africa and regions adjoining the Black Sea.

== Description ==
A small, annual, bright blue flowered speedwell, growing upright to 20 cm (7.9 in). It has small, broadish leaves (to 12 mm long) that are conspicuously toothed (not lobed) and are often reddened on the underside, that diminish to the top of the flowering plant, becoming untoothed. Its blue flowers are small (3–4 mm diam) with a somewhat small central style (1–2 mm). It is somewhat glandular-hairy above.

Photographic examples can be seen on iNaturalist.

== Distribution and habitat ==
Its native range is Albania, Algeria, Austria, Belgium, Bulgaria, Czechoslovakia, Denmark, France, Germany, Greece, Hungary, Italy, Crete, Crimea, Morocco, Netherlands, North Caucasus, Poland, Romania, Sicily, South European Russia, Spain, Sweden, Switzerland, Tunisia, Turkey, Ukraine, Yugoslavia, and introduced into the British Isles.

Its European habitat is dry, sandy or stony ground; in Turkey, rocky steppe, pastures and fields, 900–1,600 m (3,000–5,200 ft).
