= Mureș Floodplain Natural Park =

Nature reserve in western Romania

- Parcul Natural Lunca Mureșului
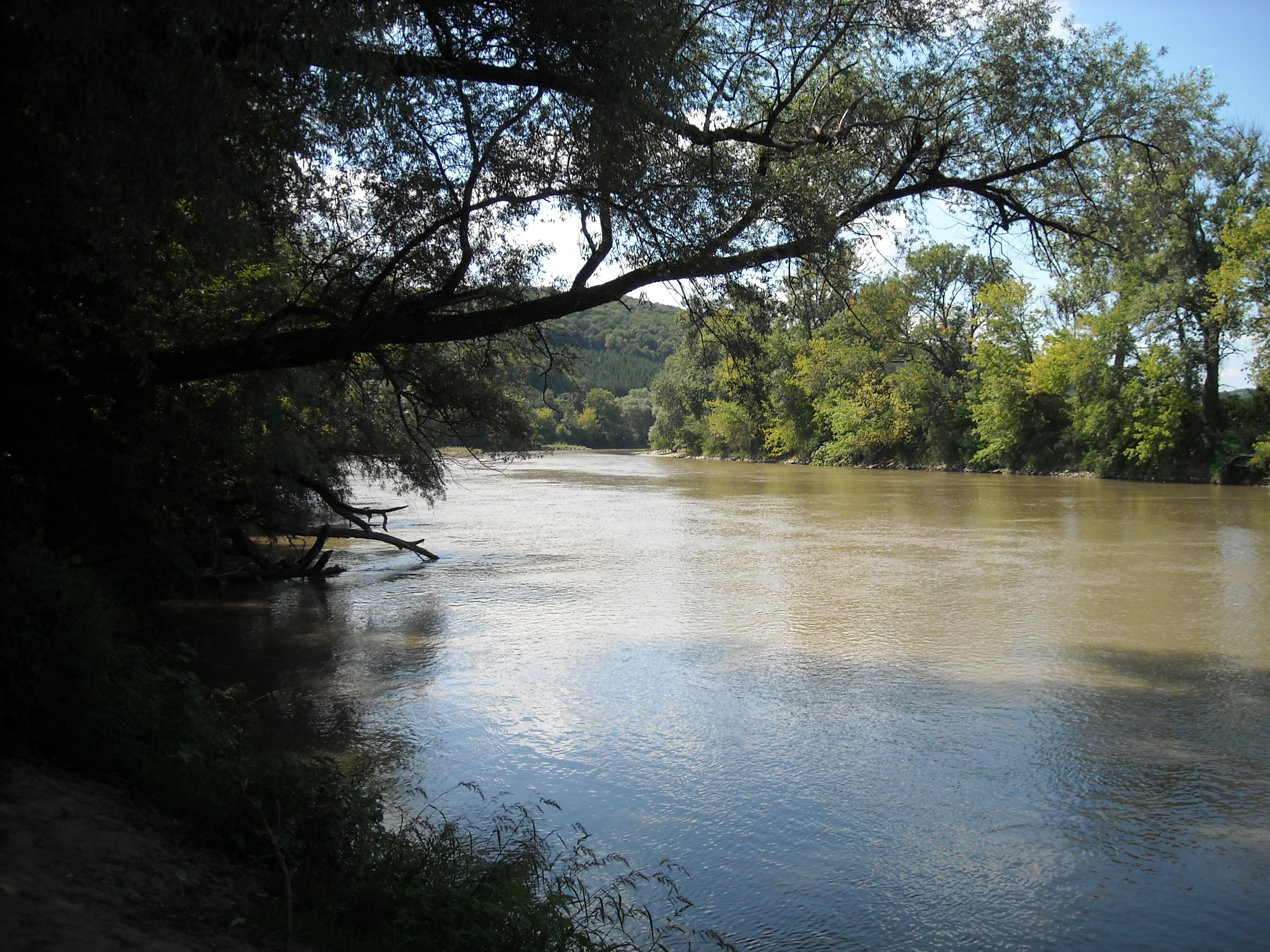
- Mureș River

- Location within Romania
- Interactive map of Mureș Floodplain Natural Park
- Location: Romania; Arad County; Timiș County
- Nearest city: Arad
- Coordinates: 46°08′06″N 20°59′20″E
- Area: 17.166 hectares (42.42 acres)
- Established: 2005
- Website: www.luncamuresului.ro

Ramsar Wetland
- Official name: Mures Floodplain
- Designated: 19 January 2006
- Reference no.: 1606

The Mureș Floodplain Natural Park, set aside by the Romanian government in 2005, is located in western Romania outside the city of Arad. The park covers 17,455 ha and follows the river Mureș westward from the city of Arad to the Hungarian border. The park is a typical ecosystem for wetlands, with running waters, lakes, swamps and floodplains, with forests, an important place for the passage and nesting of bird species and is subjected to periodical floods (a flood every three years). The forests (7,500 ha) in the park are made up primarily of common oak, narrow-leafed ash, black and white poplar, white willow, and American black walnut. This area is an important place for nesting and passage for nearly 200 species of birds, most of which are strictly protected internationally.

The main purpose of the Mureș Floodplain Natural Park is to protect and preserve the habitats and landscape diversity from the region. The park has been designated a Ramsar site, and under Natura 2000, the park was designated a SPA (Special Protection Area) for birds, and a SAC (Special Area of Conservation) for other species and habitats. Within the park, there are 4 strictly protected natural reserves: The Cenad Forest (310.5 ha), Big Isle of Cenad (2.1 ha), Igriș Islands (7 ha), and Prundul Mare (717.9 ha).

The park is a sister park with the Körös-Maros National Park, in Hungary. The two parks border each other and have created a cross-border protected area with a future common management plan.

== Biology ==
The Mureș Floodplain Natural Park has an ecosystem that is typical for wetlands, with running and still waters, large forests and periodic floods (every several years).

=== Flora ===
The vegetation in the park grows in a continental climate, with warm summers and moderate winters. The annual average temperature is 10.5 °C (50.9 °F) and the average annual rainfall is 550 mm (22 in). Many plants within the park need the periodic flooding in order to germinate and to consume the nutrients freshly dissolved in the water.

A large number of plants in the park are on "the red list of superior plants in Romania", meaning they are vulnerable or rare species. Some of these include: yarrow (Achillea thracica), water soldier (Stratiotes aloides), common corncockle (Agrostemma githago), Cirsium brachycephalum, prostrate false pimpernel (Lindernia procumbens), brittle waternymph (Najas minor), hog's fennel (Peucedanum officinale), lesser butterfly-orchid (Platanthera bifolia), Scottish dock (Rumex aquaticus), French vetch (Vicia narbonensis L. ssp. serratifolia).

Besides this, there are also three species which are strictly protected according to the Bern Convention: European waterclover (Marsilea quadrifolia), floating watermoss (Salvinia natans), water caltrop (Trapa natans).

Stands of oak (Quercus robur) and ash (Fraxinus angustifolia) are predominant in the park, together with the coppices of black and white poplar (Populus nigra and Populus alba) and white willow (Salix alba). These species are mostly found in the small forest in the Cenad area and in the 6,000-ha forest along the Mureș River between Arad and the village of Semlac (which includes the Ceala Forest).

=== Fauna ===
The fauna in the park encompasses a multitude of species, from large mammals to species living on the river bottom.

There are large populations of mammal species living within the park. Among these are: European hamster (Cricetus cricetus), European polecat (Mustela putorius), brown long-eared bat (Plecotus auritus), otter (Lutra lutra), European wildcat (Felis silvestris), red fox (Vulpes vulpes), red deer (Cervus elaphus), wild boar (Sus scrofa), fallow deer (Dama dama) and roe deer (Capreolus capreolus).

In 1988, the area which is now the Mureș Floodplain Natural Park was designated as an Important Bird Area because of the existence of numerous bird species. Nearly all the birds living in The Mures Floodplain Natural Park are included in the annexes of the Bern Convention and the EU's Habitats Directive. Among them is the lesser spotted eagle (Aquila pomarina), whose numbers within the park are low, but which was chosen as symbol of the natural park.

Approximately 200 species of birds live or pass through the park every year. Among these are: great cormorants (Phalacrocorax carbo), black-crowned night-heron (Nycticorax nycticorax), grey heron (Ardea cinerea), mallard (Anas platyrhynchos), black-headed gull (Larus ridibundus), Eurasian coot (Fulica atra), little bittern (Ixobrychus minutus), little grebe (Tachybaptus ruficollis), water rail (Rallus aquaticus), European bee-eater (Merops apiaster).

There is also a very large number of sand martins (Riparia riparia). Nearly half of the entire population of sand martins on the Mureș River can be found within the Mureș Floodplain Natural Park.

All six of the species of reptiles and nine species of amphibians identified within the park are mentioned in the annexes of the Bern Convention and the EU's Habitats Directive. Their inclusion in these lists is due to the regress of these species, which are considered barometers for the state of an ecosystem's health. Among these are: European pond terrapin (Emys orbicularis), dice snake (Natrix tessellata), European fire-bellied toad (Bombina bombina), and the great crested newt (Triturus cristatus).

For the fish species in the park, the periodic flooding of the Mureș River is a blessing; this process provides new spawning grounds, as well as generating new food and protection. The ichthyofauna in the park has a rich diversity and contains more fish species than any other section of the Mureș River. It is only in this section of the Mureș River that some species exist: white-eye bream (Abramis sapa), zarte (Vimba vimba), crucian carp (Carassius carassius), brown bullhead (Ameiurus nebulosus), striped ruffe (Gymnocephalus schraetser), zingel (Zingel zingel).

== Recreation/tourism ==
Because of the proximity of the park to so many municipalities, the area that is now the Mureș Floodplain Natural Park has been used for recreation for centuries. Throughout time, local citizens have depended on this area for both recreation and to sustain their lives. The creation of the park in 2005, insures this will continue in the future, but with oversight and regulations. The most visited areas of the park are the Ceala Forest (due to its proximity to the city of Arad) and the Bezdin area (widely known as the most natural section of the park).

=== The Ceala Forest Visitor Center ===
Between 2001 and 2005, the Mureș Floodplain Natural Park implemented, at what was then the largest Phare grant in Romania (co-financed for 2.6 million Euros). Among other infrastructure projects, this grant built the park's current visitor center.

In May 2007, the Ceala Forest Visitor Center, just outside the city of Arad, had its grand opening. The building houses a 34-bed hotel, a conference room that seats up to 70 people, a kitchen and dining area, a laboratory, and the park's administrative offices.

=== Eco-tourism ===
The park's eco-tourism program has two components: a guided/unguided canoe trip on the Mures River from the city of Arad to the town of Pecica; and bicycle rentals to be used on the park's bicycle trail network. Both are extremely popular during the spring and summer months.

=== Cultural ===
There are three monasteries within the park boundaries. All three monasteries are owned and operated by their respective churches, but due to their proximity to the Mureș River and its important ecosystem, these lands fall under the supervision and protection of the Mureș Floodplain Natural Park.

On the northern side of the river is the Saint Paraschiva Monastery, which can be found just outside the village of Bodrogu Vechi. This is the newest monastery in the park and is accessed from the town of Pecica.

On the southern side of the river are other two monasteries. The Hodoș-Bodrog Monastery, dating from 1177, is one of the oldest monastic institutions in the Romanian Orthodox Church. The monastery is accessible from the village of Bodrogu Nou and is 17 km from the city of Arad. The monastery is active and has many monks living and working there.

The Bezdin Monastery, dating from 1539, is one of the few Serbian Orthodox monasteries in Romania which is still preserved. In comparison to the Hodoș-Bodrog Monastery, Bezdin is very isolated and is situated in what is considered the most natural part of the Mureș Floodplain Natural Park. The monastery is accessible from the commune of Munar and is 31 km from the city of Arad.

=== Bird watching and wildlife viewing ===
Because of the rich bird life within the park, the park administration constructed two structures in the Bezdin area. In 2004, the park erected a wildlife viewing tower in an area of the forest that is known to have wildlife viewing potential. In 2005, the park erected a bird watching tower near the Bezdin marsh. Both of these towers are accessible from the Bezdin Monastery and the commune of Munar.

=== Hunting and fishing ===
Hunting is allowed within the park during certain seasons and in specific areas. Fishing is also allowed, but only with a fishing license.

== Environmental education ==
Because of the close proximity to a large city and the potentially large impact this causes the park, the park's environmental education program grew rapidly in the first three years in existence: 100 students (2006), 900 students (2007), and over 2,000 students (2008).

The park administration was trained by Outward Bound Romania on experiential education strategies in the summer of 2007. The park has the Romanian park system's first low ropes course and has received notoriety in Romanian national news and within the park system for its education efforts.

== See also ==
- Defileul Mureşului Superior Natural Park
- Protected areas of Romania
