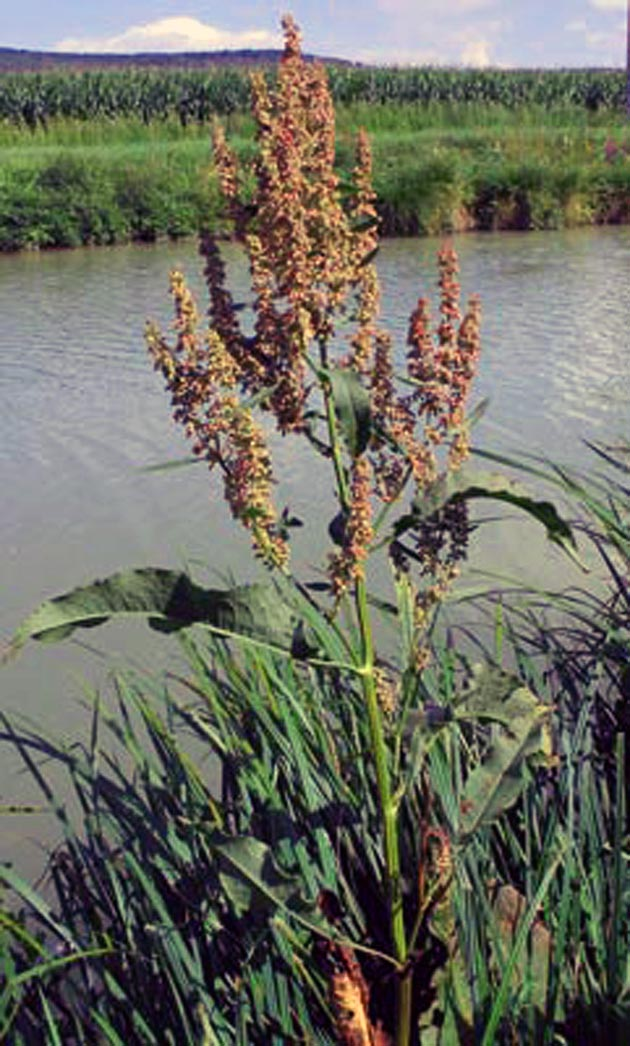

Scientific classification
- Kingdom: Plantae
- Clade: Tracheophytes
- Clade: Angiosperms
- Clade: Eudicots
- Order: Caryophyllales
- Family: Polygonaceae
- Genus: Rumex
- Species: R. hydrolapathum

Binomial name
- Rumex hydrolapathum Huds.

= Rumex hydrolapathum =

Great water dock

Species of flowering plant

Rumex hydrolapathum, the great water dock, water dock, or giant water dock, is a species of perennial herbaceous plants in the genus Rumex native to fens and freshwater banks of Europe and Western Asia. It is the tallest species in the genus, with flowering stems attaining a height of up to 2 m (6 ft 7 in). It is one of the small number of decaploid organisms, containing two hundred individual chromosomes.

== Description ==
Great water dock is a tall perennial plant reaching a height of 2 m (6 ft 7 in). During its first year it has a rosette of long-stalked, hairless leaves with lanceolate leaf blades up to 80 cm (31 in) in length. These have smooth margins and are generally unwrinkled. These leaves are large and taper at both ends, and their lateral veins are at right angles to the midrib. In subsequent years it produces an upright flowering stem, unbranched until the base of the inflorescence. The stem is tough, grooved, green when young but turning reddish with age. Leaves growing on the stem are alternate, arching and decreasing in size higher up the stem. The inflorescence is a compound raceme. The numerous small flowers are regular, with the perianth segments in two whorls of three, the outer whorl spreading and the inner one covering the developing fruits. There are six stamens, three fused carpels and three styles. The fruit is a triangular–ovate achene, at first green then brown. This plant flowers from June to September.

== Distribution and habitat ==
The great water dock is a native of Europe and western Asia. It grows beside lakes and rivers and the sea. It is usually close to the margin of the water line or growing in shallow water. Its distribution affects the distribution of the large copper butterfly. When the Norfolk fens were drained in the 19th century the loss of the great water dock led to the local extinction of the large copper.
