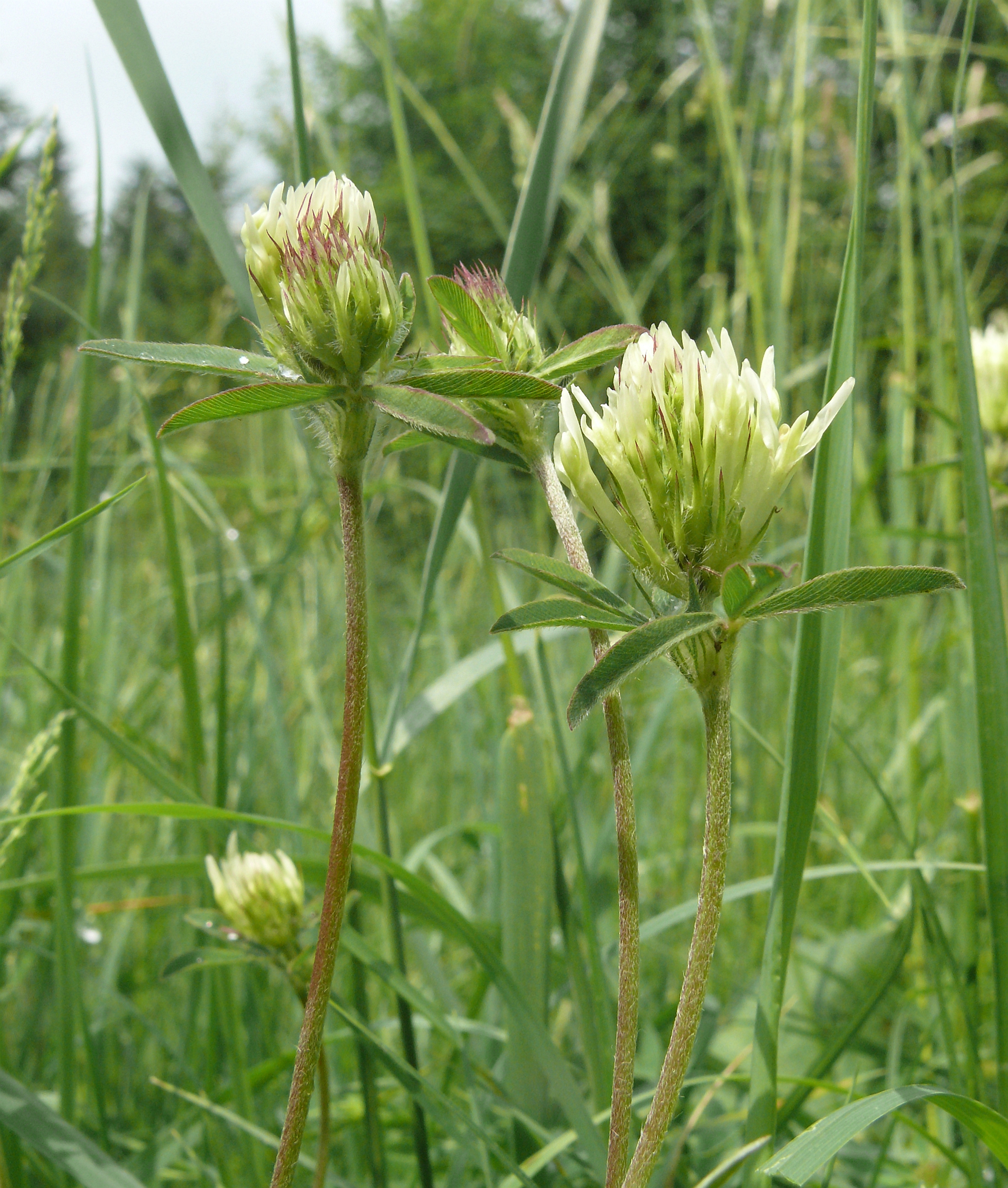

Scientific classification
- Kingdom: Plantae
- Clade: Tracheophytes
- Clade: Angiosperms
- Clade: Eudicots
- Clade: Rosids
- Order: Fabales
- Family: Fabaceae
- Subfamily: Faboideae
- Genus: Trifolium
- Species: T. ochroleucon

Binomial name
- Trifolium ochroleucon Huds.

Synonyms
- Trifolium ochroleucum Huds.

= Trifolium ochroleucon =

Species of legume

Trifolium ochroleucon, also known as Trifolium ochroleucum or sulphur clover, is a perennial species of clover in the family Fabaceae.

== Name ==
The genus name, Trifolium, derives from the Latin tres, "three", and folium, "leaf", so called from the characteristic form of the leaf, which usually but not always has three leaflets (trifoliolate); hence the popular name "trefoil". The species name, ochroleucon, is Latin for "yellowish-white", referring to the colour of the flowers.

== Distribution and habitat ==
The plant is native to Europe. It is localised in the British Isles, with the main stronghold of the species being in East Anglia, whilst the species is also present in Lincolnshire, Merseyside and Worcestershire. It is fairly widespread throughout the rest of Western and Central Europe, and it has also been recorded from Iran and North Africa.

It can be found in grassy places, predominantly on clay soils.
