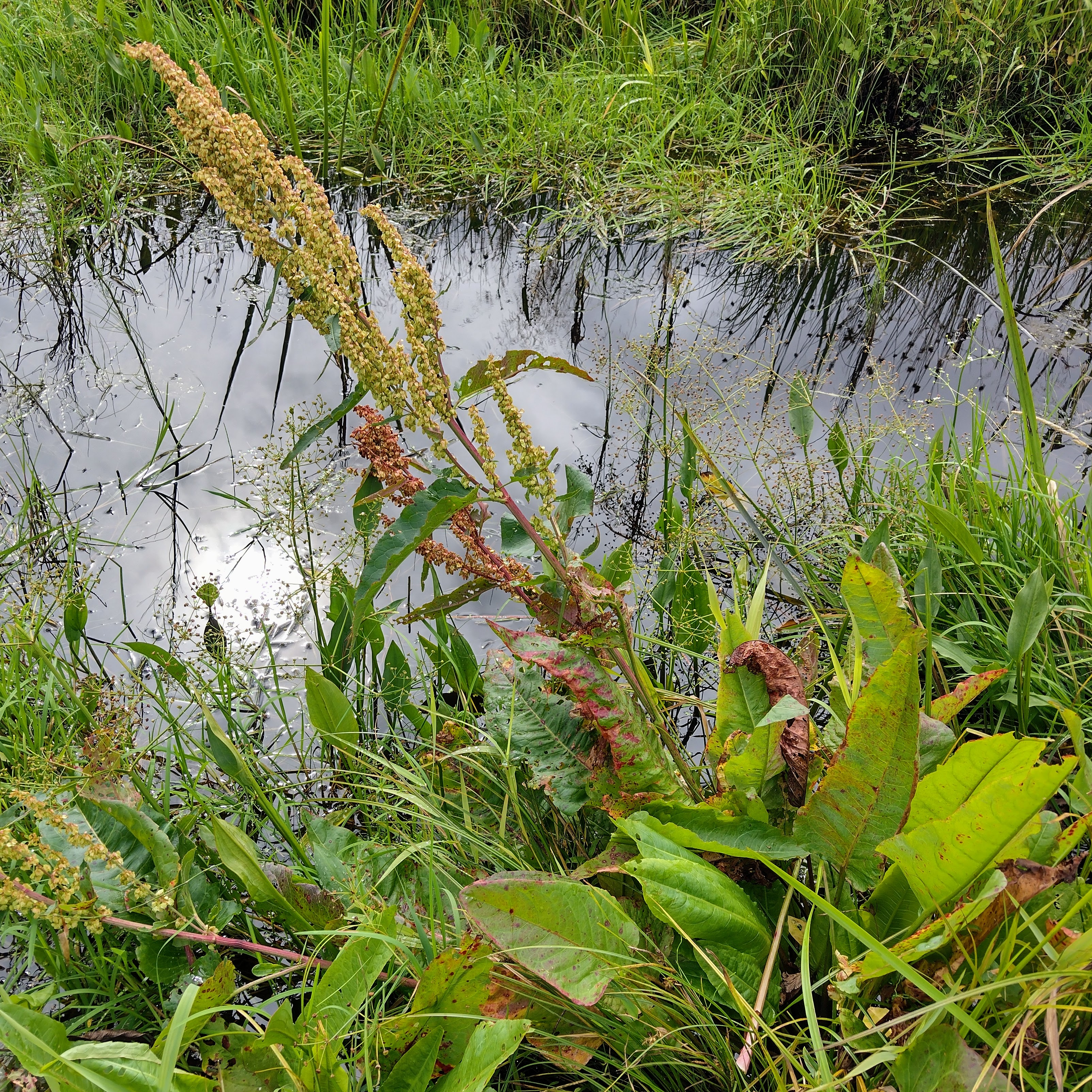
- Rumex aquaticus near Loch Lomond, Scotland

Scientific classification
- Kingdom: Plantae
- Clade: Embryophytes
- Clade: Tracheophytes
- Clade: Angiosperms
- Clade: Eudicots
- Order: Caryophyllales
- Family: Polygonaceae
- Genus: Rumex
- Species: R. aquaticus

Binomial name
- Rumex aquaticus L.

Synonyms
- Lapathum aquaticum (L.) Scop.; Rumex caldeirarum H.C.Watson ex Meisn.; Rumex helolapathum Drejer ex Hornem.; Rumex herba-britannicus Horv.; Rumex paludosus Huds.; Rumex rheifolius Schult. & Schult.f.; Rumex schischkinii Losinsk.

= Rumex aquaticus =

Species of flowering plant

Rumex aquaticus is a flowering plant in the knotweed family, Polygonaceae. It is native to temperate Eurasia. It is commonly known as the Scottish dock, and is found in aquatic environments.

== Identification ==
Rumex aquaticus can be identified by its upright, reddish stout, large heart-shaped leaves to 45 cm long around the base, and smaller leaves around the stalk. It can grow to about 2 m tall. When flowering, Rumex aquaticus can be identified by its red, pink, and green 3 sepal flowers surrounding the stalk.

It can hybridise with several other species of Rumex, most particularly R. obtusifolius (Rumex × platyphyllus), but also with R. crispus (Rumex × conspersus) and R. sanguineus (Rumex × dumulosus).

== Habitat ==
Rumex aquaticus is native to temperate Eurasia, from Britain and France east to Japan and eastern Siberia; in Britain it is very rare, restricted to a small area around the south end of Loch Lomond. It is a waterside plant, needing nutrient rich, wet soil to grow, including lakesides, sides of streams and rivers, or any other environment with access to shallow water.

== Distribution ==
Rumex aquaticus is a hermaphrodite (both male and female) and is pollinated by wind. The seeds require a moist environment for germination but cannot germinate if submerged in water.
