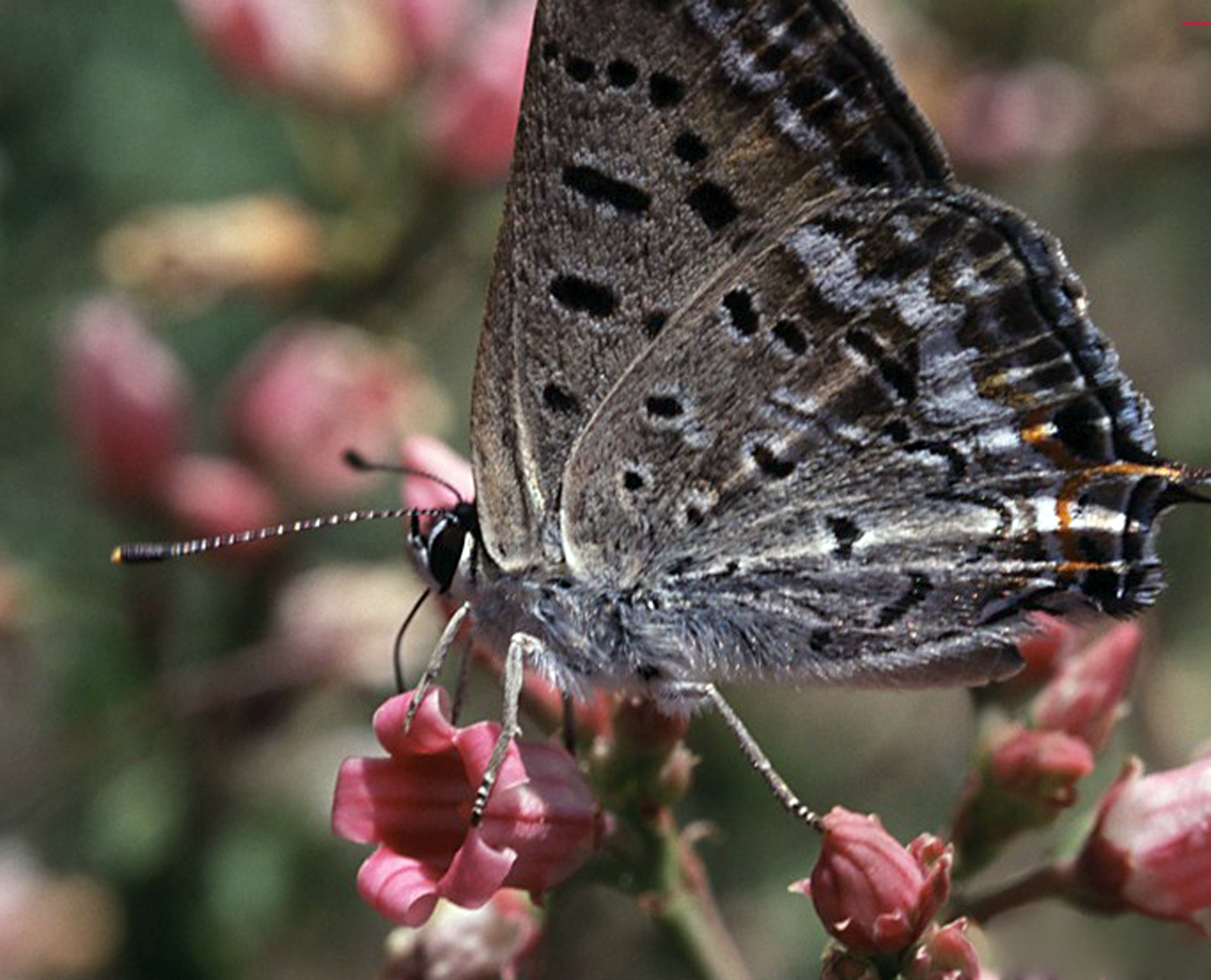

Conservation status
- Apparently Secure (NatureServe)

Scientific classification
- Domain: Eukaryota
- Kingdom: Animalia
- Phylum: Arthropoda
- Class: Insecta
- Order: Lepidoptera
- Family: Lycaenidae
- Genus: Lycaena
- Species: L. arota

Binomial name
- Lycaena arota (Boisduval, 1852)

Synonyms
- Polyommatus arota Boisduval, 1852; Tharsalea arota

= Lycaena arota =

Species of butterfly

Lycaena arota, the tailed copper, is a butterfly of the family Lycaenidae. It is found in North America from New Mexico north and west to Oregon, south to southern California and Baja California, Mexico.

The average wingspan ranges from 30–35 mm. Adults are on wing from May to August in one generation per year. The migration of butterflies can be caused by various factors such as the distribution of food plants, evasion of natural enemies, and climate change. They feed on flower nectar.

The larvae feed on the leaves of Ribes species. The species overwinters as an egg. It is commonly confused with two other species, Lycaena gorgon and Lycaena xanthoides .

== Subspecies ==
- Lycaena arota arota
- Lycaena arota virginiensis Edwards, 1870 (California, Nevada, Colorado)
- Lycaena arota nubila (Comstock, 1926) (California) – clouded copper
- Lycaena arota schellbachi (Tilden, 1955) (Arizona) – Schellbach's copper
