= Antipodolycaena =

Scientific classification
- Domain: Eukaryota
- Kingdom: Animalia
- Phylum: Arthropoda
- Class: Insecta
- Order: Lepidoptera
- Family: Lycaenidae
- Genus: Lycaena
- Subgenus: Antipodolycaena

Species
- See text

Subgenus of butterflies

Antipodolycaena is a subgenus of the genus Lycaena which is found only in New Zealand. Antipodolycaena includes four species that are endemic to New Zealand:

- Lycaena boldenarum White, 1862 (type species)
- Lycaena feredayi (Bates, 1867)
- Lycaena rauparaha (Fereday, 1877)
- Lycaena salustius (Fabricius, 1793)
