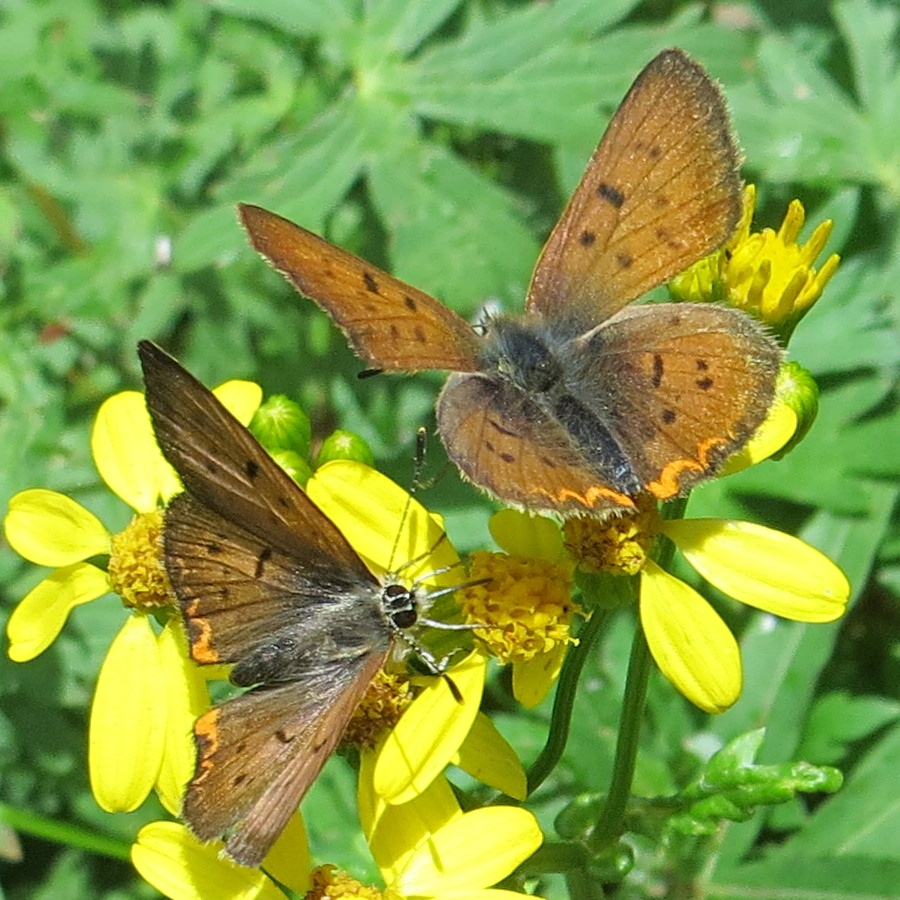
- Two males

Conservation status
- Secure (NatureServe)

Scientific classification
- Domain: Eukaryota
- Kingdom: Animalia
- Phylum: Arthropoda
- Class: Insecta
- Order: Lepidoptera
- Family: Lycaenidae
- Genus: Lycaena
- Species: L. dorcas

Binomial name
- Lycaena dorcas (Kirby, 1837)

= Lycaena dorcas =

Species of butterfly

Lycaena dorcas is a species of butterfly in the family Lycaenidae, the gossamer-winged butterflies. Its common names include dorcas copper and cinquefoil copper. The species was first described by William Kirby in 1837. It is native to North America. The species L. dospassosi was once included in L. dorcas.

== Description ==
The top side is brown. The male has a blue-purple iridescence and the female has a few lighter areas. The male is similar in coloration to that of L. helloides. The hindwings have red-orange spots on the border. The underside is brown with a slight orange tint. The wingspan is 2.5–3.2 cm (0.98–1.26 in). The caterpillar is pale green with a single dark green dorsal line and faint white bands.

== Range and habitat ==
L. dorcas occurs as far north as boreal Alaska and south to Washington in the west and the Great Lakes region in the east. There is an isolated population in Maine. Its habitat includes bogs and old overgrown fields.

== Life cycle ==
There is one flight between June and September. The male stays near the host plant to seek females. The females lay white eggs singly on the undersides of the leaves. The eggs drop with the leaves in autumn and overwinter. The caterpillars hatch in spring and return to the host plant to feed.

Larval host plants include Potentilla fruticosa and species of Rumex and Polygonum.
