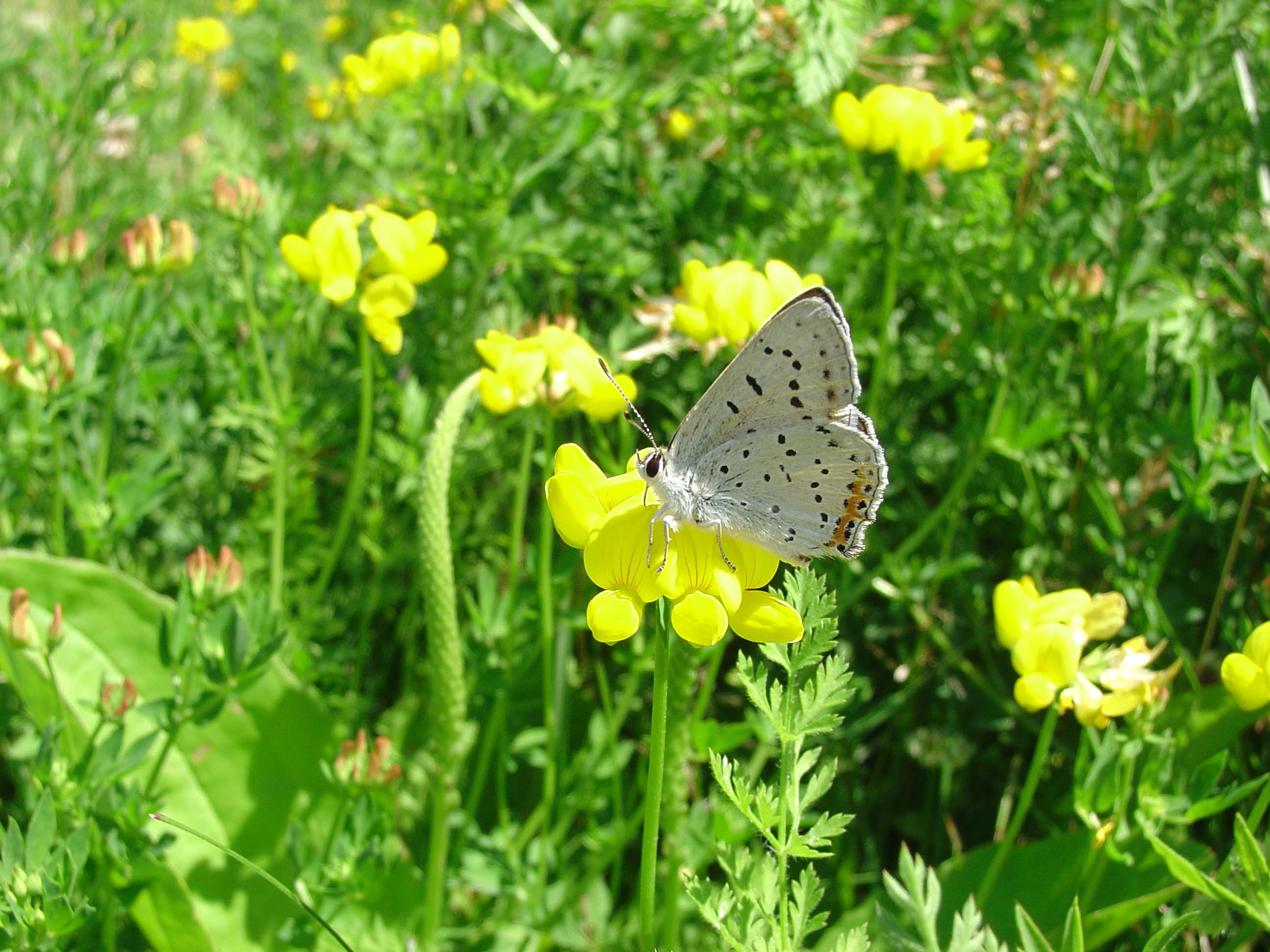

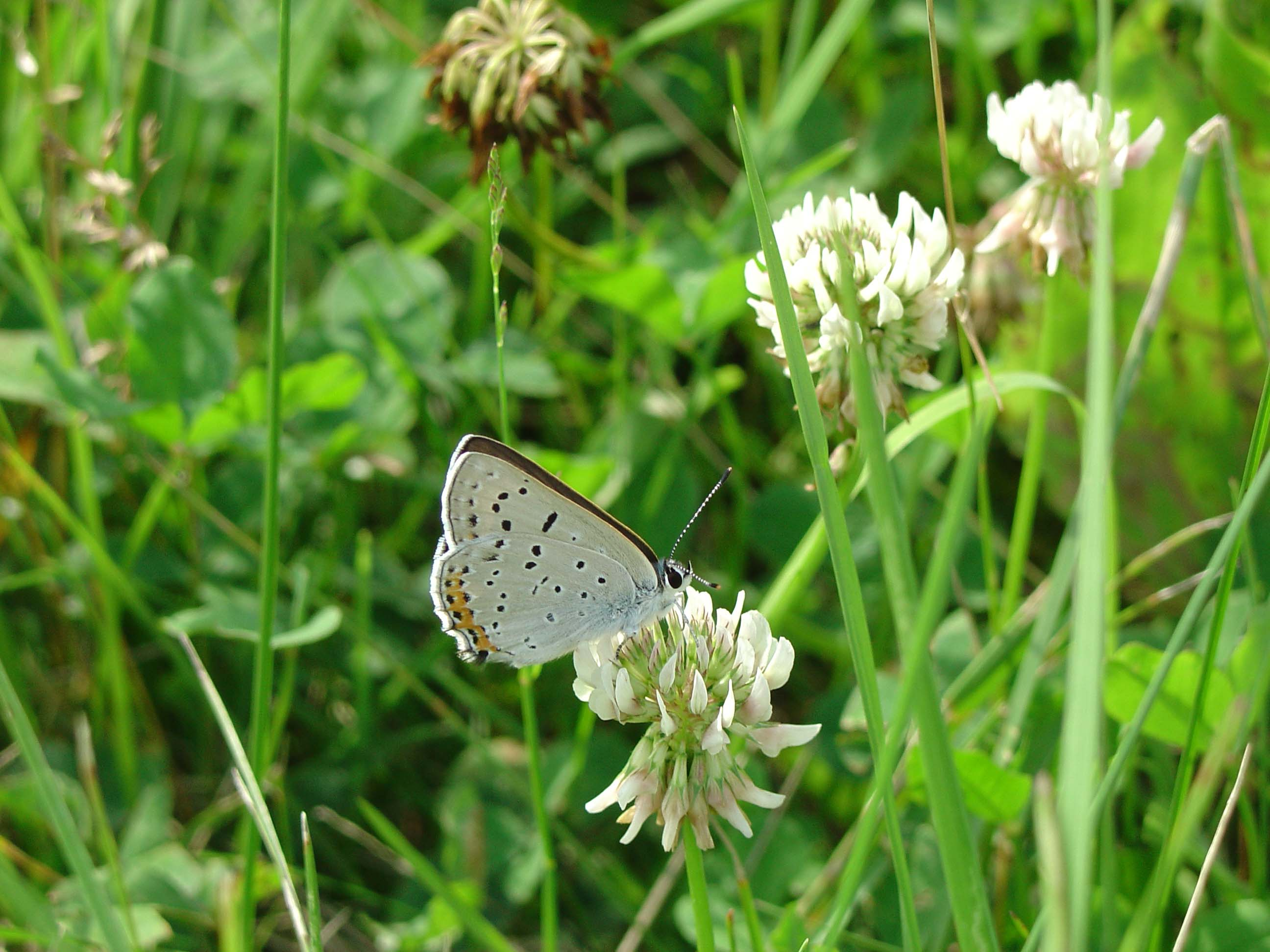

Conservation status
- Secure (NatureServe)

Scientific classification
- Domain: Eukaryota
- Kingdom: Animalia
- Phylum: Arthropoda
- Class: Insecta
- Order: Lepidoptera
- Family: Lycaenidae
- Genus: Lycaena
- Species: L. dione

Binomial name
- Lycaena dione (Scudder, 1868)

Synonyms
- Chrysophanus dione Scudder, 1868; Gaeides dione; Tharsalea dione

= Lycaena dione =

Species of butterfly

Lycaena dione, the grey copper or great copper, is a butterfly of the family Lycaenidae. The species was first described by Samuel Hubbard Scudder in 1868. It is found from the southern Prairie provinces of Canada and western Ontario south to Texas and east to Illinois and Missouri. There is a disjunct population in southern British Columbia. A remnant population was found in the Willamette Valley, Oregon, as of the summer of 2004.

The wingspan is 24–38 mm. Adults are on wing from mid-June to July or August. They feed on the nectar of Cirsium, Medicago sativa, Grindelia species and Melilotus species.

The larval host plants are Rumex salicifolius, Rumex crispus and Rumex occidentalis.

== Taxonomy ==
Lycaena dione is sometimes treated as a subspecies of Lycaena xanthoides.
