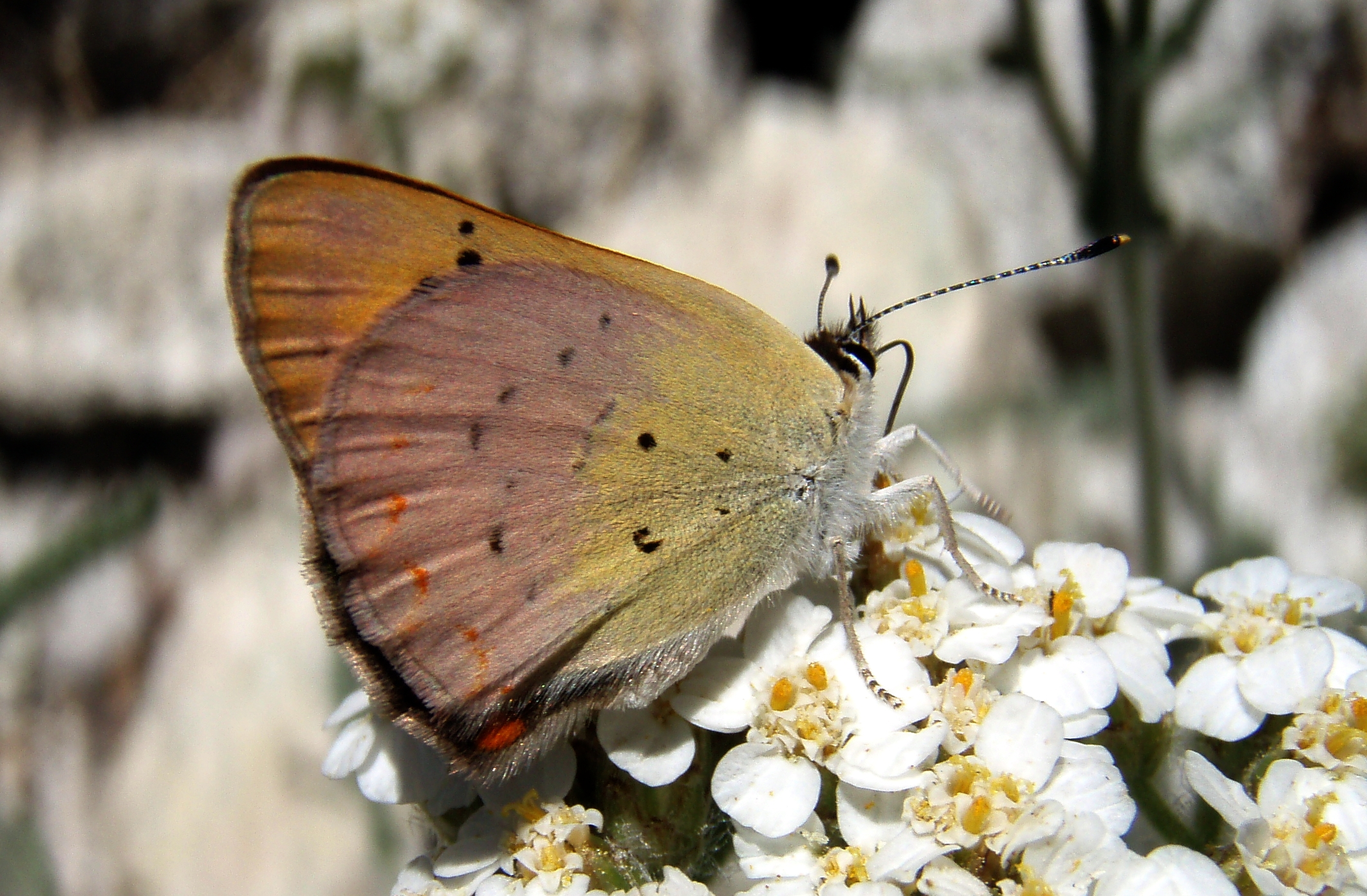

Conservation status
- Apparently Secure (NatureServe)

Scientific classification
- Domain: Eukaryota
- Kingdom: Animalia
- Phylum: Arthropoda
- Class: Insecta
- Order: Lepidoptera
- Family: Lycaenidae
- Genus: Lycaena
- Species: L. nivalis

Binomial name
- Lycaena nivalis (Boisduval, 1869)

Synonyms
- Polyommatus nivalis Boisduval, 1869; Epidemia nivalis

= Lycaena nivalis =

Species of butterfly

Lycaena nivalis, the lilac-bordered copper or nivalis copper, is a butterfly of the family Lycaenidae. It is found in the western mountains of North America.

The wingspan is 25–29 mm. Adults are on wing from July to mid-August.

The larvae feed on Polygonum douglasii.

== Subspecies ==
- Lycaena nivalis nivalis
- Lycaena nivalis browni dos Passos, 1938
