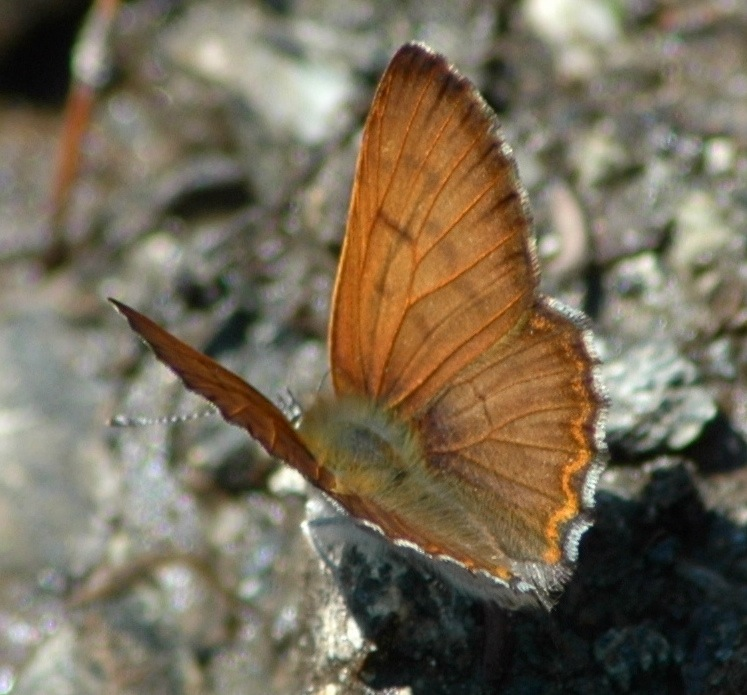

Conservation status
- Secure (NatureServe)

Scientific classification
- Domain: Eukaryota
- Kingdom: Animalia
- Phylum: Arthropoda
- Class: Insecta
- Order: Lepidoptera
- Family: Lycaenidae
- Genus: Lycaena
- Species: L. mariposa

Binomial name
- Lycaena mariposa (Reakirt, 1866)

Synonyms
- Polyommatus mariposa Reakirt, 1866; Polyommatus zeroe Boisduval, 1869; Epidemia zeroe Dyar, 1903; Epidemia mariposa Dyar, 1903

= Lycaena mariposa =

Species of butterfly

Lycaena mariposa, the mariposa copper, is a butterfly of the family Lycaenidae. It is found in western Canada and the United States.

The wingspan is 23–28 mm. Adults are on wing from mid-July to August.

The larvae feed on Vaccinium arbuscula and Polygonum douglasii.

== Subspecies ==
- Lycaena mariposa penroseae
- Lycaena mariposa charlottensis
