= Lycaena clarki =

Eastern sorrel copper

Conservation status
- Least Concern (IUCN 3.1)

Scientific classification
- Kingdom: Animalia
- Phylum: Arthropoda
- Class: Insecta
- Order: Lepidoptera
- Family: Lycaenidae
- Genus: Lycaena
- Species: L. clarki

Binomial name
- Lycaena clarki Dickson, 1971

Species of butterfly

Lycaena clarki, the eastern sorrel copper, is a butterfly of the family Lycaenidae. It is found only in South Africa.

The wingspan is 21–27 mm in males and 22–30 mm in females. The butterfly flies year-round, peaking in summer.

Larval food is Rumex lanceolatus. The larvae vary considerably in colour, ranging from plain green to pinkish red. However, there is always a white subspiracular stripe and a dorsal line of a darker colour. Both eggs and pupa may hibernate.
