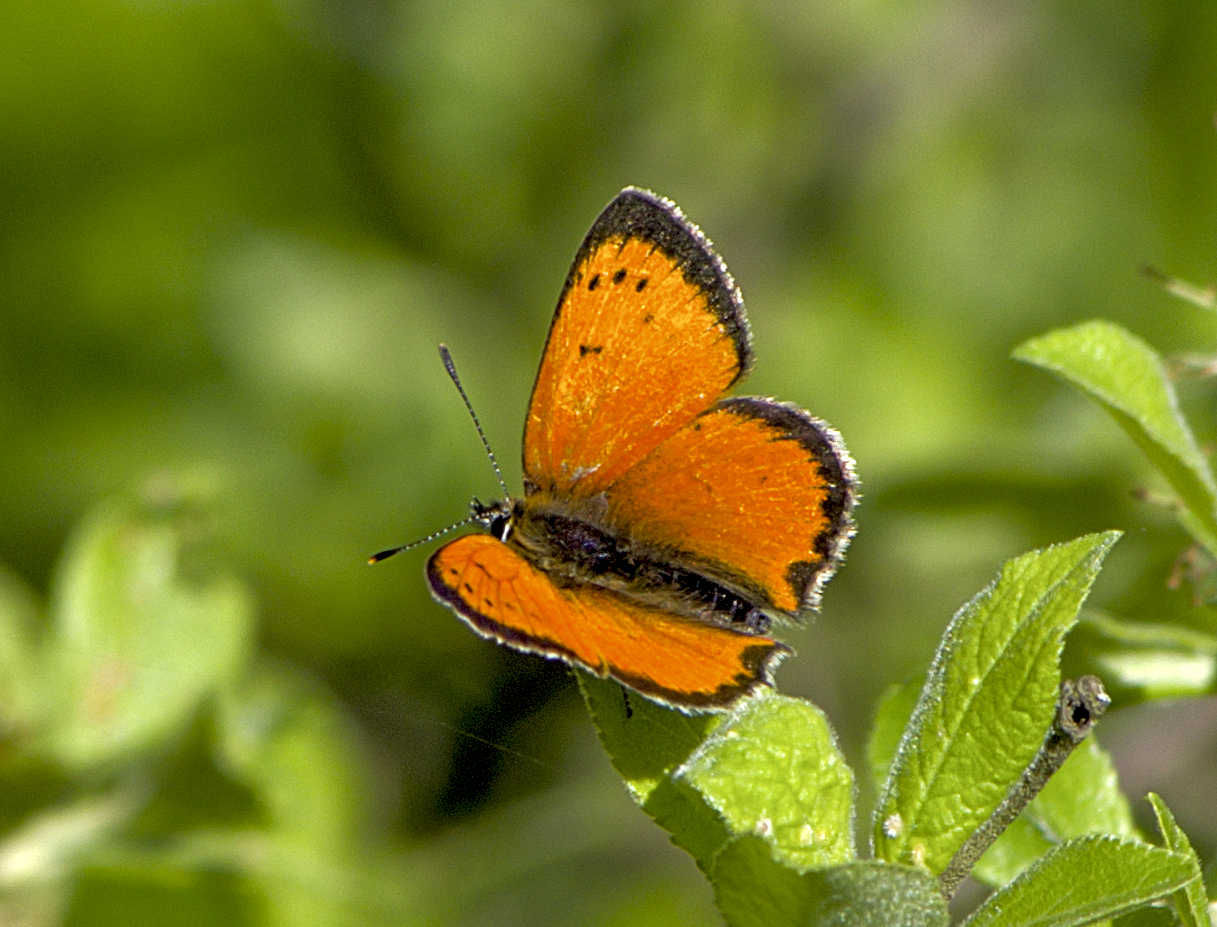

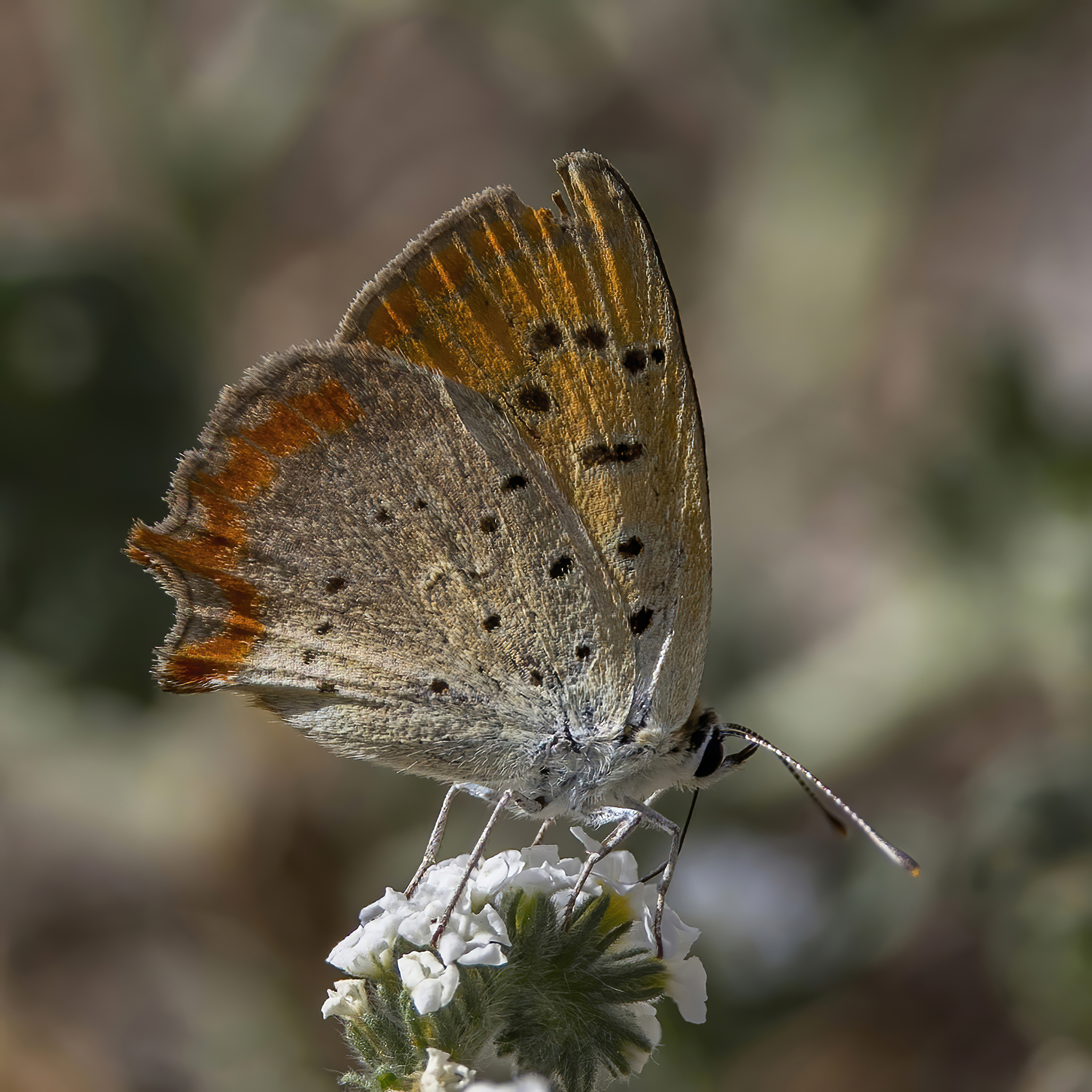

Conservation status
- Vulnerable (IUCN 2.3)

Scientific classification
- Kingdom: Animalia
- Phylum: Arthropoda
- Class: Insecta
- Order: Lepidoptera
- Family: Lycaenidae
- Genus: Lycaena
- Species: L. ottomanus

Binomial name
- Lycaena ottomanus (Lefèbvre, 1830)

= Lycaena ottomanus =

Species of butterfly

Lycaena ottomanus is a species of butterfly in the family Lycaenidae. It is found in Albania, Bosnia and Herzegovina, Bulgaria, Greece, Hungary, North Macedonia, Serbia and Montenegro, and Turkey. Its natural habitats are temperate forests and temperate shrubland. It is threatened by habitat loss.

== Description from Seitz ==
Above very similar to virgaureae; the hindwing of the male with very short but distinct tails. The underside quite different, the hindwing bearing a row of cinnabar- red spots before the margin. In spring-specimens the ground-colour of the underside of the hindwing is plumbeous grey, being more yellowish in the individuals of the second brood. The former, moreover, bear frequently black dots on the upperside of the forewing. — On the Balkan Peninsula and in Asia Minor, in May and June, locally so common that, e. g., Mann obtained near Brussa over 100 specimens in two hours.

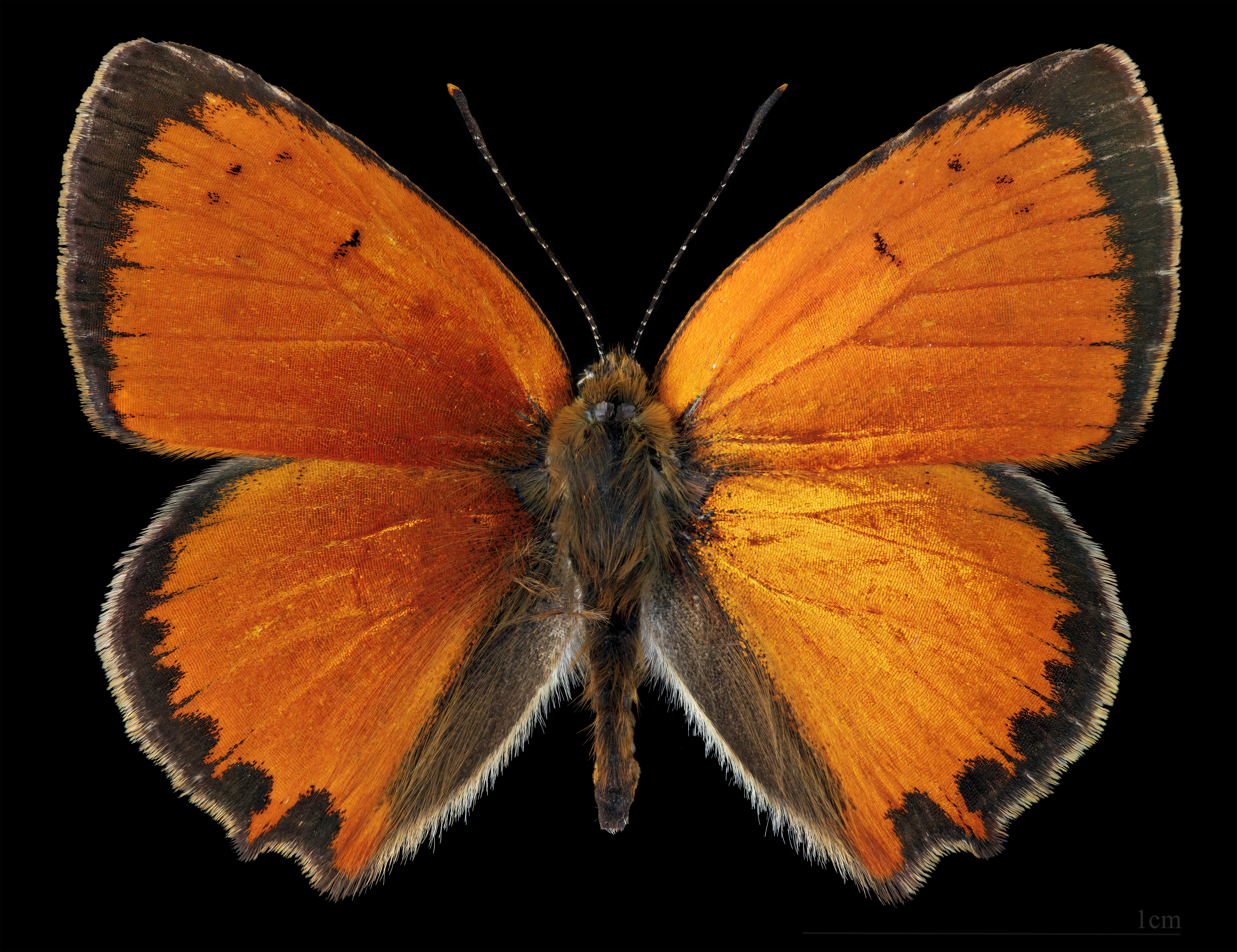
Lycaena ottomanus ♂

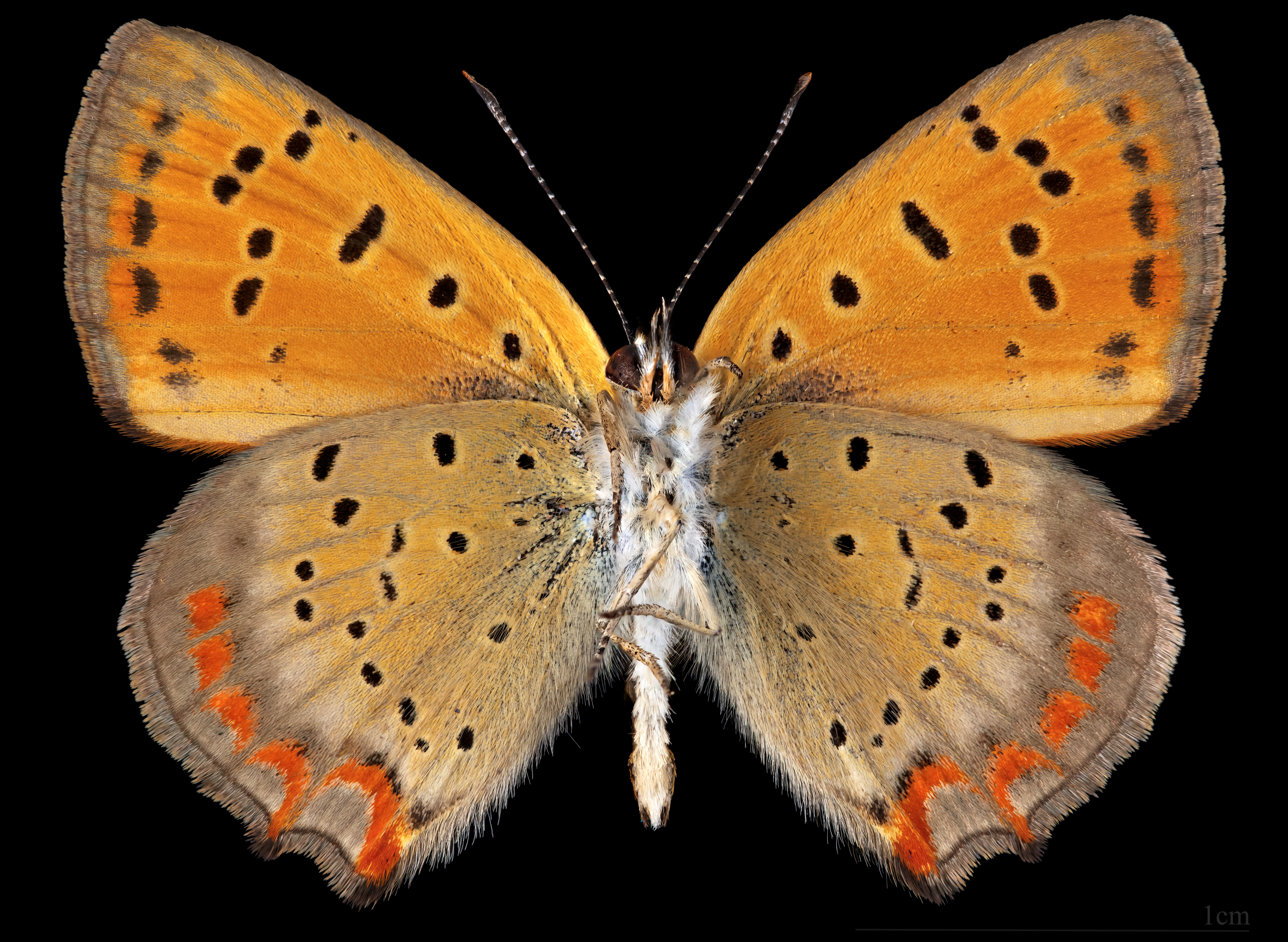
Lycaena ottomanus ♂ △

== Sources ==
- Van Swaay, C.A.M.; Warren, M.S. (2000). "Lycaena ottomana". IUCN Red List of Threatened Species. 2000 e.T39486A10228760. doi:10.2305/IUCN.UK.2000.RLTS.T39486A10228760.en.
