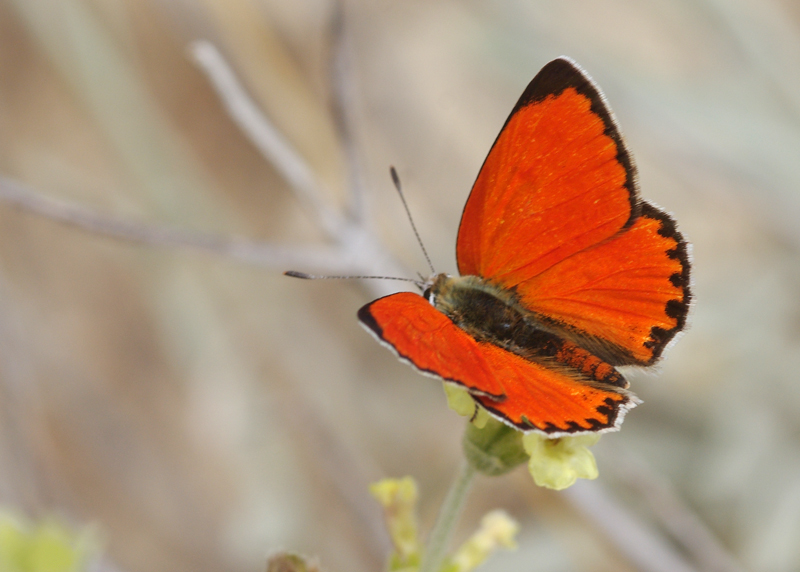

Scientific classification
- Domain: Eukaryota
- Kingdom: Animalia
- Phylum: Arthropoda
- Class: Insecta
- Order: Lepidoptera
- Family: Lycaenidae
- Genus: Lycaena
- Species: L. thetis

Binomial name
- Lycaena thetis Klug 1834

= Lycaena thetis =

Golden copper

Species of butterfly

Lycaena thetis, the golden copper, is a small butterfly found in Greece, Asia Minor - Armenia (highlands), Iraq, Iran, Baluchistan, Chitral and Ladak that belongs to the lycaenids or blues family.

== Description from Seitz ==
C. thetis Klug (= Ignitus H.-Schaff.) (76 c) At once recognized by the black apex of the forewing of the male being continued along the costal margin for some distance and by the markings of the underside of the hindwing being almost entirely suppressed by light scaling. In the southern districts of the Balkan Peninsula, Asia Minor and Transcaucasia. — caudatus Stgr. (76 c, d, on the plate caudata) is a form (spring- brood?) with thin but rather long tail. — The name-typical form flies in July and is plentiful on flowering thyme, occasionally being found together with virgaureae.

== See also ==
- List of butterflies of India
- List of butterflies of India (Lycaenidae)
