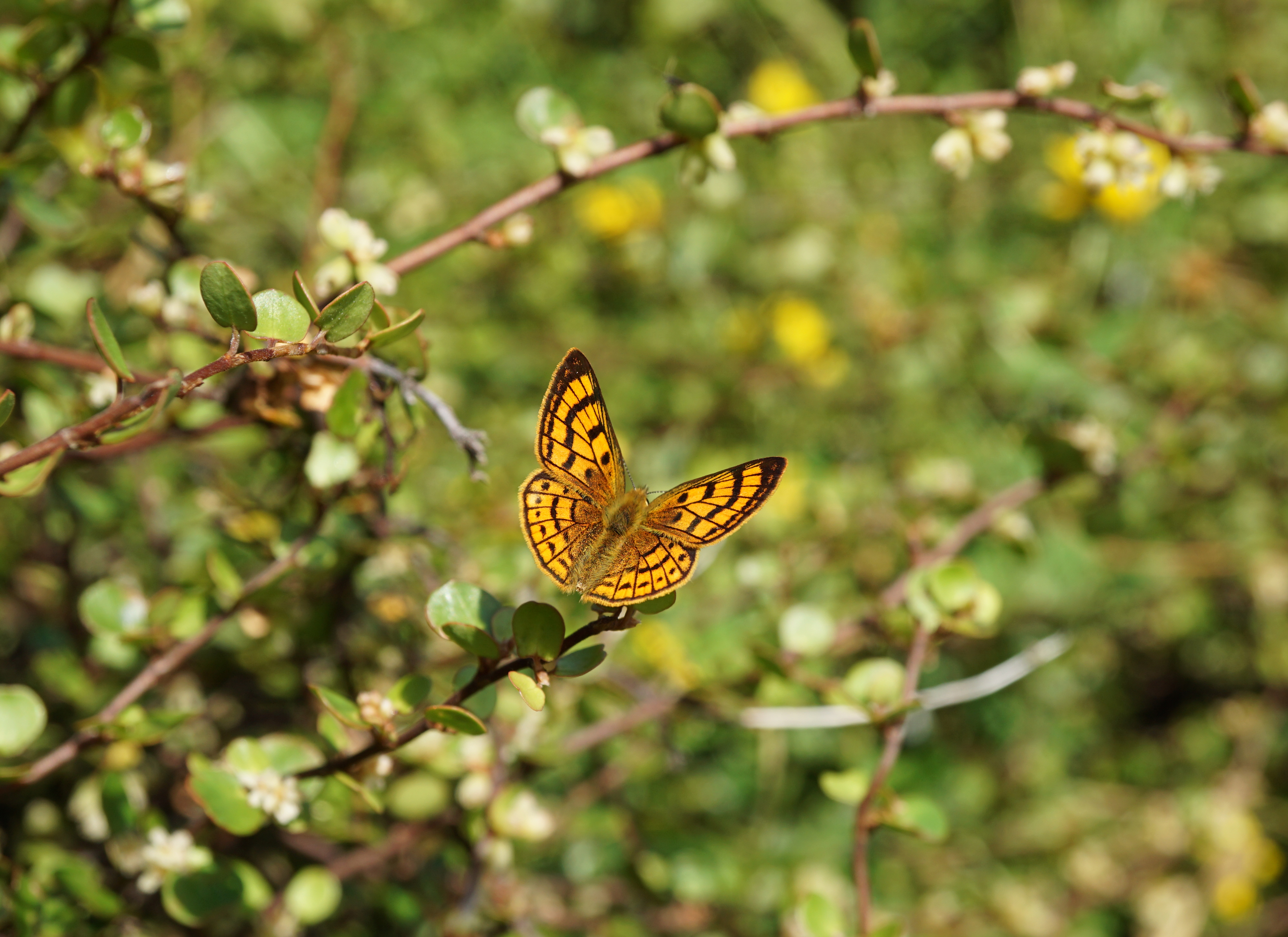
- Rauparaha's copper butterfly on Muehlenbeckia complexa

Scientific classification
- Kingdom: Animalia
- Phylum: Arthropoda
- Clade: Pancrustacea
- Class: Insecta
- Order: Lepidoptera
- Family: Lycaenidae
- Genus: Lycaena
- Species: L. rauparaha

Binomial name
- Lycaena rauparaha (Fereday, 1877)

Synonyms
- Chrysophanus rauparaha Fereday, 1877

= Lycaena rauparaha =

Species of butterfly

Lycaena rauparaha, Rauparaha's copper, Fereday's copper or mokarakare is a species of butterfly endemic to New Zealand. It acquired its English common name because it occurred in the same coastal areas as the rangatira (chief) and war leader of Ngāti Toa, Te Rauparaha.

== Distribution and habitat ==
Lycaena rauparaha can be found along the western and northern coasts of North Island and the northern coast of South Island, where they live mainly among coastal dunes, though they can be found in other coastal habitats where their food plants are present.

== Biology ==
=== Immature stages ===
Eggs are laid singularly on the underside of a leaf of a food plant, typically Muehlenbeckia complexa although the species has also been recorded on Muehlenbeckia axillaris, and are greenish-blue with white ridges.

The larvae are velvet green and closely resemble those of Lycaena salustius. It has the typical lappets and ridges of Lycaena species. It overwinters as larva, after the first moult, possibly in response to seasonal unavailability of its deciduous food plant.

Pupation occurs in October. Pupae are green-yellow with red-brown wing casings, similar in appearance to those of Lycaena salustius, but without the latter's black abdominal spots. Pupae are hidden on the ground under a dead leaf to which they secure themselves.

=== Adults ===
Lycaena rauparaha has a wing span of 25 to 31 mm, and is less variable in appearance than other Lycaena species occurring in New Zealand. According to G.W. Gibbs (1980), it resembles the other species in (what was at the time known as) the salustius-rauparaha-feredayi complex, but unlike Lycaena salustius, its wing veins are marked with single, not double, black lines; and unlike Lycaena feredayi, the underside of its hindwings is either "uniformly banana-yellow with some indistinct markings" or "spangled with pale yellow scales overlying brown ground colour"; whereas in L. feredayi, the underside of the hindwings of is either yellow at the base with a brown central patch, or fully brown-orangish. Female specimens have stronger vein markings than males. Lycaena rauparaha has a quick, jerky flight pattern that remains near the ground. They generally do not travel far from their larval food plant.

== See also ==
- Butterflies of New Zealand
