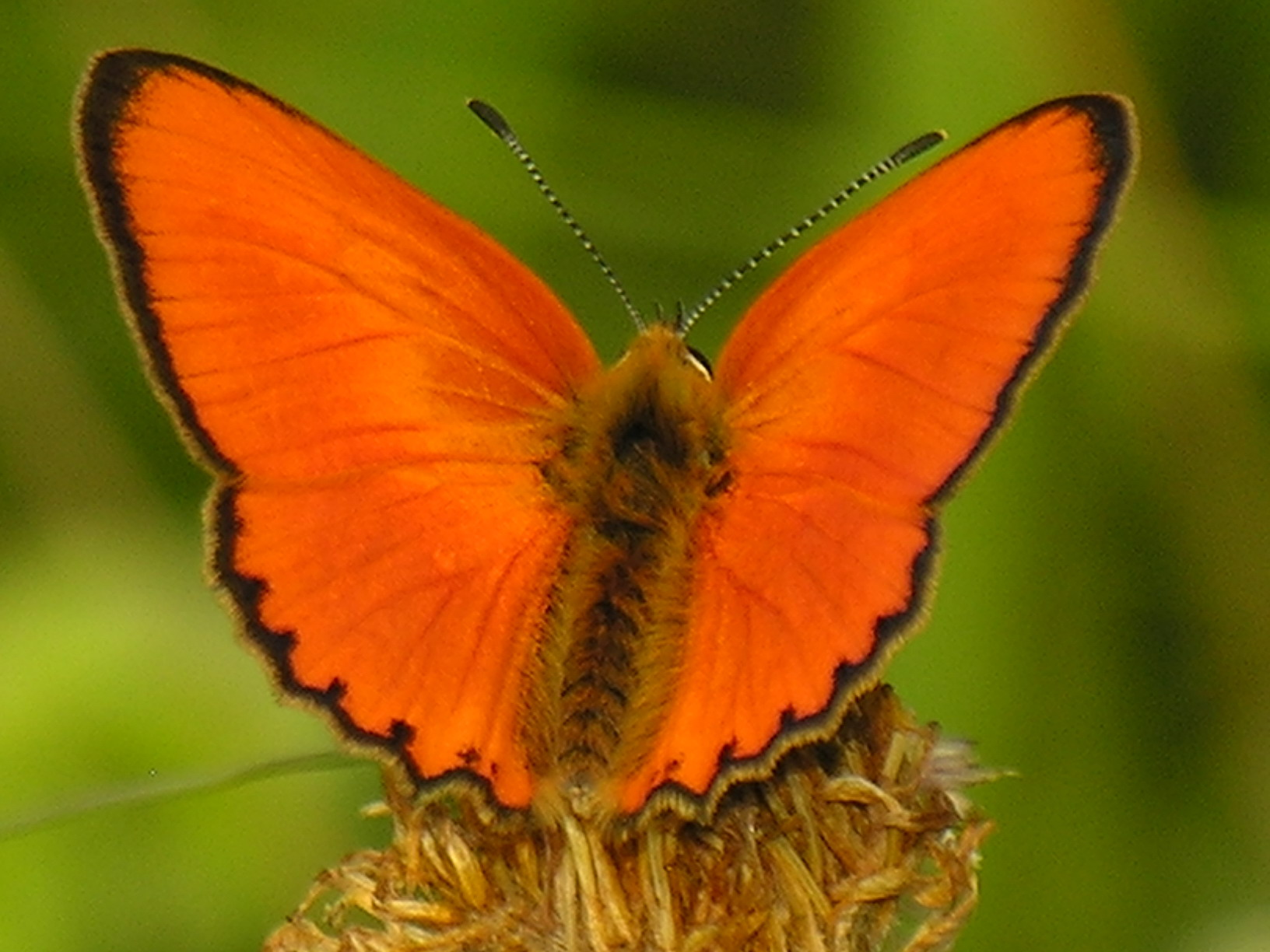
- Lycaena virgaureae

Scientific classification
- Kingdom: Animalia
- Phylum: Arthropoda
- Clade: Pancrustacea
- Class: Insecta
- Order: Lepidoptera
- Family: Lycaenidae
- Subfamily: Lycaeninae
- Tribe: Lycaenini
- Genus: Lycaena; Fabricius, 1807

Synonyms
- Antipodolycaena Smart, 1975; Boldenaria Zhdanko, 1995; Chalceria Scudder, 1876; Chrysophanus Hübner, 1818 (rejected); Chysoptera Zincken, 1817; Disparia Verity, 1943 (non Nagano, 1916: preoccupied Epidemia Scudder, 1876; Helleia Verity, 1943; Heodes Dalman, 1816; Hermelycaena L.D.Miller & F.M.Brown, 1979; Hyllolycaena L.D.Miller & F.M.Brown, 1979; Loweia Tutt, 1906; Lycia Sodovskii, 1837 (non Hübner, 1825: preoccupied); Migonitis Sodovskii, 1837 (non Rafinesque, 1815: preoccupied Palaeochrysophanus Verity, 1934 (nomen nudum); Palaeochrysophanus Verity, 1943; Palaeoloweia Verity, 1934; Rapsidia Sibatani, 1974; Rumicia Tutt, 1906; Tharsalea Scudder, 1876; Thersamolycaena Verity, 1957; Thersamonia Verity, 1919 and see text

= Lycaena =

Butterfly genus in family Lycaenidae

Lycaena is a genus of butterflies. The genus range is Holarctic, with the exception of four species found in New Zealand, two in South Africa, one in New Guinea and one in Java. It is commonly divided into several subgenera, such as Antipodolycaena. Many formerly independent genera are now subsumed within Lycaena; the genus Gaiedes may also belong here. Many of the subgenera, species groups and species listed here may be synonyms.

== Species ==
Listed alphabetically within groups:

Subgenus Tharsalea Scudder, 1876:

- Lycaena arota (Boisduval, 1852) – tailed copper

Subgenus Chalceria Scudder, 1876:
The thaeides species group:

- Lycaena dione (Scudder, 1868)
- Lycaena editha (Mead, 1878) – Edith's copper California, Montana, Wyoming, Nevada
- Lycaena gorgon (Boisduval, 1852) – gorgon copper Nevada, California, Oregon
- Lycaena xanthoides (Boisduval, 1852) – great gray copper California

The chalceria species group:

- Lycaena ferrisi Johnson & Balogh, 1977 – Ferris' copper Arizona
- Lycaena heteronea Boisduval, 1858 – blue copper
- Lycaena rubidus (Behr, 1866) – ruddy copper

Subgenus Epidemia Scudder, 1876:
The hyllolycaena species group:

- Lycaena hyllus (Cramer, [1775]) – bronze copper

The epidemia species group:

- Lycaena dorcas Kirby, 1837 – dorcas copper or cinquefoil copper
- Lycaena dospassosi McDunnough, 1940
- Lycaena epixanthe (Boisduval & Leconte, [1835]) – bog copper, cranberry-bog copper
- Lycaena helloides (Boisduval, 1852) – purplish copper
- Lycaena nivalis (Boisduval, 1869) – nivalis copper
- Lycaena mariposa (Reakirt, 1866) – mariposa copper

Subgenus Hermelycaena Miller & Brown, 1979:

- Lycaena hermes (Edwards, 1870) – Hermes copper

Subgenus Antipodolycaena Smart, 1975:

- Lycaena boldenarum White, 1862 New Zealand
- Lycaena feredayi (Bates, 1867) – glade copper
- Lycaena rauparaha (Fereday, 1877) New Zealand
- Lycaena salustius (Fabricius, 1793) – common copper

Unnamed subgenus:
The heodes species group:

- Lycaena ottomanus (Lefèbvre, 1830) – Grecian copper
- Lycaena tityrus (Poda, 1761) – sooty copper
- Lycaena virgaureae (Linnaeus, 1758) – scarce copper

The palaeochrysophanus species group:

- Lycaena candens (Herrich-Schäffer, [1844]) South Europe, Caucasus, Transcaucasia
- Lycaena hippothoe (Linnaeus, 1761) – purple-edged copper

Subgenus Lycaena Fabricius, 1807:
The helle species group:

- Lycaena helle ([Schiffermüller], 1775) – violet copper
- Lycaena irmae Bailey, 1932 South Tibet
- Lycaena li (Oberthür, 1886) West China
- Lycaena ouang (Oberthür, 1891) Yunnan
- Lycaena pang (Oberthür, 1886) West China, Tibet
- Lycaena svenhedini (Nordström, 1935) China
- Lycaena tseng (Oberthür, 1886) North Burma to West China

The phlaeas species group:

- Lycaena cupreus (Edwards, 1870) – lustrous copper
- Lycaena kiyokoae Sakai, 1978 Afghanistan
- Lycaena phlaeas (Linnaeus, 1761) – small copper, common copper, American copper
- Lycaena sichuanica Bozano & Weidenhoffer, 2001

| class="col-break " | The thersamolycaena species group:

- Lycaena aeolus Wyatt, 1961 West Pamirs, Afghanistan
- Lycaena aeolides (Churkin, 1999) Tajikistan (Gissar Range), Central Asia
- Lycaena alciphron (Rottemburg, 1775) – purple-shot copper
- Lycaena dispar (Haworth, 1802) – large copper
- Lycaena splendens (Staudinger, 1881) Dzhungarsky Alatau, Tian-Shan (Central Asia)
- Lycaena violaceus (Staudinger, 1892)

The thersamonia species group:

- Lycaena aditya (Moore, [1875]) Tajikistan (Gissar Range), Afghanistan, Pakistan, North India
- Lycaena alaica (Grum-Grshimailo, 1888) Tajikistan (Gissar Range), Afghanistan
- Lycaena alpherakyi (Grum-Grshimailo, 1888) East Pamirs, Northwest China
- Lycaena attila (Zhdanko, 1990) Zaalaisky Mountains (Trans-Ili Alatau) Central Asia
- Lycaena asabinus (Herrich-Schäffer, [1851]) Turkey, Transcaucasia, Iran, Armenia
- Lycaena hyrcana (Neuburger, 1903) NIran to Central Asia
- Lycaena kurdistanica (Riley, 1921) Armenia, Northeast Turkey, West Iran
- Lycaena lampon Lederer, [1870] Kopet-Dagh, Southeast Turkey, Iran, Afghanistan
- Lycaena ochimus (Herrich-Schäffer, [1851]) Transcaucasia, Armenia, Turkey [Transcaucasia], Syria, Lebanon, Iran, Azerbaijan)
- Lycaena phoebus (Blachier, 1905) – Moroccan copper Morocco
- Lycaena solskyi Erschoff, 1874 Pamirs to Alay Mountains, Gissar Range, Darvaz Range, Tian-Shan, Kashmir, Samarkand
- Lycaena thersamon (Esper, 1784) – lesser fiery copper
- Lycaena thetis Klug, 1834 – fiery copper or golden copper

The phoenicurusia species group:

- Lycaena margelanica (Staudinger, 1881) Tajikistan (Gissar Range), Afghanistan

The hyrcanana species group:

- Lycaena caspius (Lederer, 1869) Tajikistan, Gissar Range, Iran, Afghanistan
- Lycaena ophion Hemming, 1933 Tajikistan (Gissar Range)
- Lycaena pamira (Nekrutenko, 1983)
- Lycaena sartha (Staudinger, 1886) Tajikistan (Gissar Range), Afghanistan
- Lycaena sultan (Lang, 1884) Tajikistan (West Gissar Range)

Unknown species group:

- Lycaena bathinia Snellen, 1899 Java
- Lycaena clarki Dickson, 1971 – eastern sorrel copper
- Lycaena evansii (de Nicéville, 1902) Kashmir, Chitral
- Lycaena kasyapa (Moore, 1865) – green copper
- Lycaena orus (Stoll, [1780]) – western sorrel copper
- Lycaena ottomanus (Lefèbvre, 1830)
- Lycaena pallida Miskin, 1891 New Guinea
- Lycaena panava (Westwood, 1852)
- Lycaena pavana (Kollar, [1844]) – white-bordered copper North India
- Lycaena standfussi (Grum-Grshimailo, 1891) West China, Tibet
- Lycaena susanus (Swinhoe, 1889) Baluchistan, Afghanistan, Pakistan
- Lycaena tama (Fereday, 1878) New Zealand
- Lycaena tityrus Poda, 1761 – sooty copper
- Lycaena virgaureae (Linnaeus, 1758) – scarce copper
- Lycaena zariaspa (Moore, 1874) India (Northwest, Kashmir), West Himalayas
