= Lycaena sichuanica =

Scientific classification
- Domain: Eukaryota
- Kingdom: Animalia
- Phylum: Arthropoda
- Class: Insecta
- Order: Lepidoptera
- Family: Lycaenidae
- Genus: Lycaena
- Species: L. sichuanica

Binomial name
- Lycaena sichuanica Bozano & Weidenhoffer, 2001

Species of butterfly

Lycaena sichuanica is a butterfly of the family Lycaenidae. It is found in Sichuan in China. The species was described in 2001 and in 2009 the first female specimens were found.

There are possibly multiple generations per year.

The larvae feed on Rumex species, although first instars also accept Persicaria bistorta. They are green.
