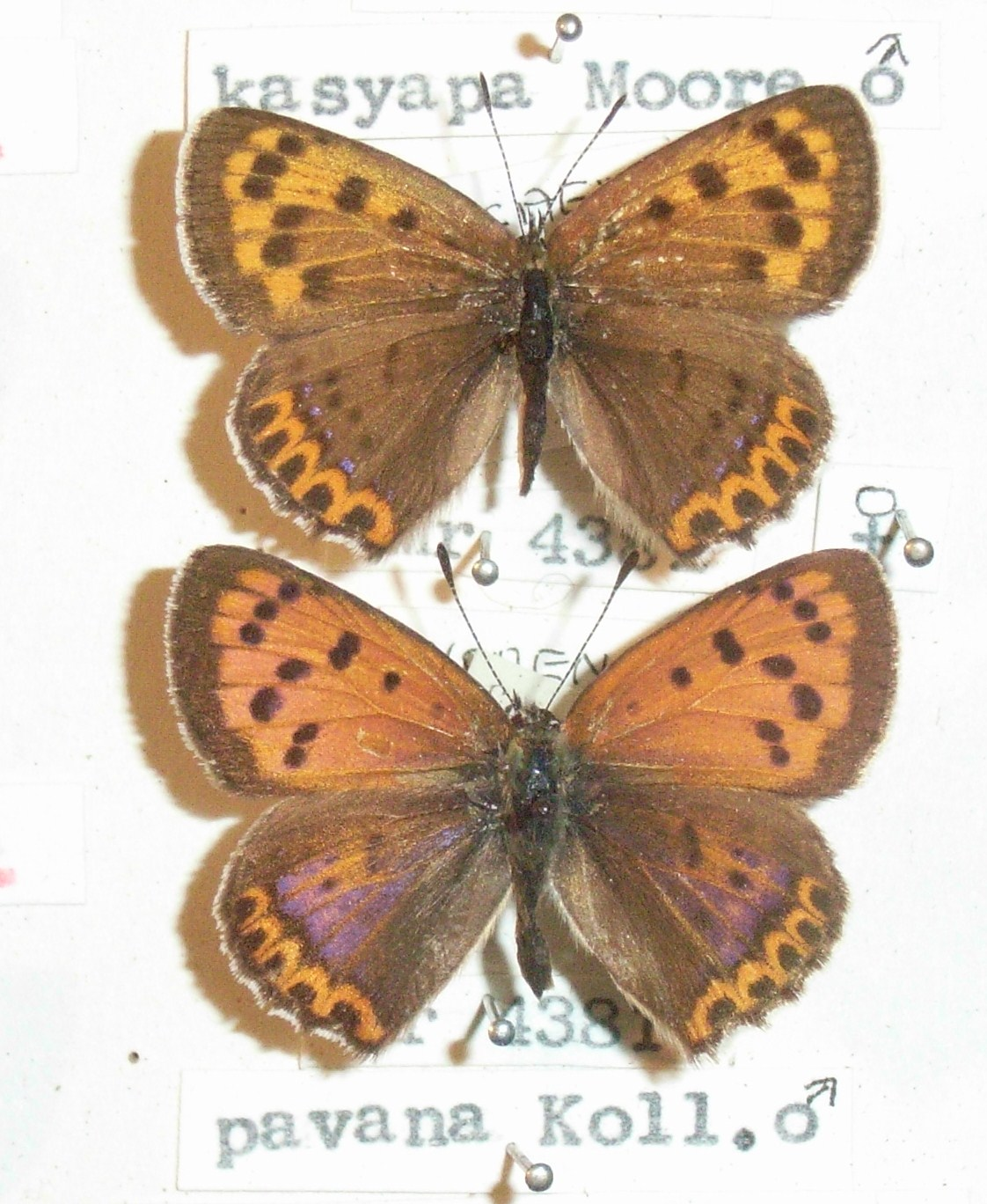
- Female above, male below

Scientific classification
- Domain: Eukaryota
- Kingdom: Animalia
- Phylum: Arthropoda
- Class: Insecta
- Order: Lepidoptera
- Family: Lycaenidae
- Genus: Lycaena
- Species: L. pavana

Binomial name
- Lycaena pavana (Kollar 1848)

= Lycaena pavana =

White-bordered copper

Species of butterfly

Lycaena pavana, the white-bordered copper, is a small butterfly found in India that belongs to the lycaenids or blues family.

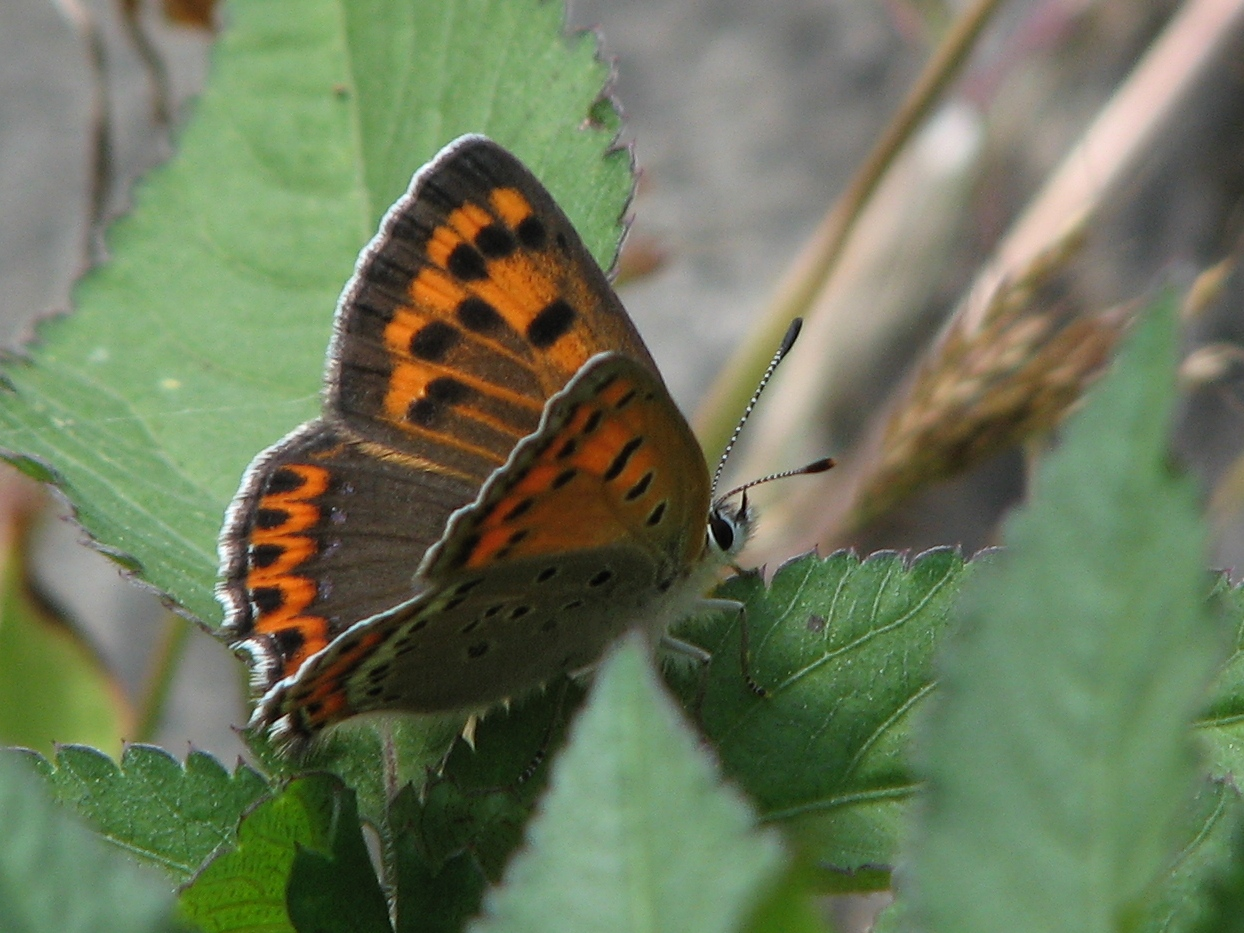

== See also ==
- List of butterflies of India
- List of butterflies of India (Lycaenidae)
