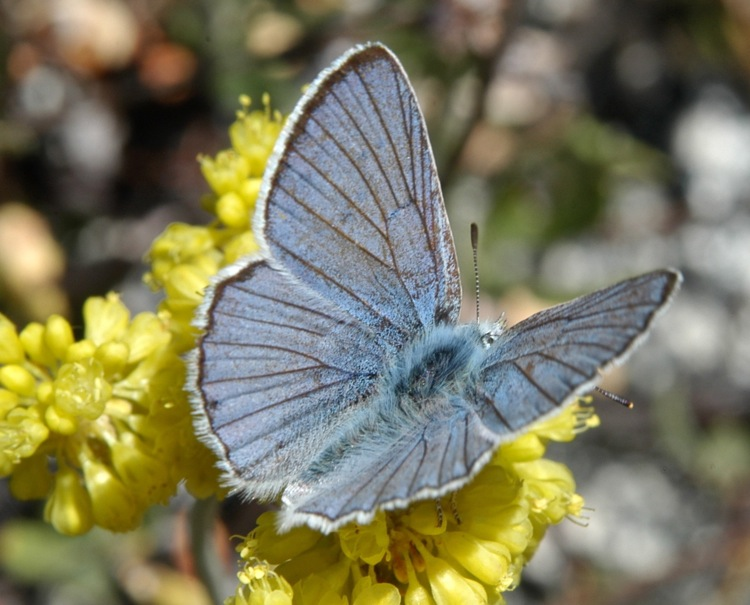

Conservation status
- Secure (NatureServe)

Scientific classification
- Kingdom: Animalia
- Phylum: Arthropoda
- Clade: Pancrustacea
- Class: Insecta
- Order: Lepidoptera
- Family: Lycaenidae
- Genus: Lycaena
- Species: L. heteronea

Binomial name
- Lycaena heteronea Boisduval, 1852

Synonyms
- Chalceria cupreus Dyar, 1903; Lycaena cupreus; Lycaena coloradensis Gunder, 1925; Lycaena gravenotata Klots, 1930

= Lycaena heteronea =

Species of butterfly

Lycaena heteronea, the blue copper, is an American butterfly that belongs to the gossamer-winged family. The butterfly is named so because of the bright blue hue of the upper side of the males' wings. Females are brown on their upper side. Both sexes are white with black spots on the underside of the wings. Blue coppers are seen on the west coast of the United States and the southwest region of Canada, particularly British Columbia and Alberta. The males are often confused with Boisduval’s blue , another species of butterfly. Blue coppers prefer to live in areas where species of Eriogonum are found. Blue copper larvae sometimes form mutualistic associations with Formica francoeuri, an ant species.

== Description ==
The blue copper is part of the family Lycaenidae and the subfamily Lycaeninae. The upper wing surface of the males is sky blue with dark veins. On females, the upper wing has more of a copper color with black dots. The wings are outlined in white. Both the male and female undersides are white or off-white, with brown-black dots on the forewing. Blue coppers have a wingspan of 29 to 35 mm. Blue coppers are in flight season from April to August, but they vary in different parts of North America. In British Columbia, adults take flight from April to July and in Alberta July to August. Males are in search for food, whereas females are looking for host plants, which suggests that males will inadvertently be around the offspring.

== Geographic range ==
Th blue copper is found in western North America. In Canada, it is found specifically in southern British Columbia and Alberta. In the United States, it has been seen in Washington and California, and as far east as Colorado and New Mexico. The blue copper's preference for buckwheat affects the species' distribution.

== Habitat ==
The blue copper is known to stay in high elevations (1208 to 1651 meters), but in central California the species stays in low elevations (917 to 1452 meters). The butterfly can be seen in brushy areas, mountain meadows, open forests, and sagebrush. Although the presence of Eriogonum attracts blue coppers, the quality of the plant determines whether the butterfly settles in that place.

=== Californian populations ===
In California, the blue copper has a restricted distribution in flat areas of Kern and Los Angeles counties and prefer canyon areas near Lebec and O’Neil Canyon. Blue coppers are also prevalent where there are oak (Quercus lobata) trees. At Frazier Park, they prefer the higher elevations where Eriogonum fasciculatum is present. Colonies in this park and canyon areas are next to or close to dry washes.

== Home range and territoriality ==
Lycaena heteronea females focus on finding suitable host plants for laying eggs and are usually found in the immediate vicinity of plants that will provide food for their larvae. . The males patrol between flower heads of Eriogonum food plants and perch on them. The males are extremely territorial with conspecific males to increase their chance of copulating with females. The males have a visual sensor that turns on when conspecific males are around. They ignore other butterfly species that may be present, even those that look extremely similar to male blue coppers, probably because the males’ main objective is to mate with females and other species do not much hinder that.

== Food resources ==
=== Caterpillars ===
The caterpillars do not have a wide selection of plants that they can feed on, primarily three buckwheat (Eriogonum) species. When caterpillars first hatch they eat from the underside of the plant. As the caterpillar grows older, it eats the whole leaf.

=== Adults ===
Adults have a wide range of plants that they can feed on, including buckwheat, green rabbitbrush, Chrysothamnus viscidiflorus, asters, yarran, gaillardia, fiddleneck, wallflower, and milkweed. This diverse diet enables the males to actively search for and defend their territory.

== Life history ==
=== Egg ===
The females lay their eggs one at a time on bracts, modified leaves, or underneath the host plant. Blue coppers are single brooded and females can lay dozens of eggs in a single sitting. The females look for plants of the best quality, usually buckwheat, because this affects their offspring's survival. The eggs, which are round and appear flattened, begin hatching the following spring.

=== Caterpillar ===
After hatching, the caterpillar starts eating the underside of the buckwheat leaf. As the caterpillar grows older, it eats all parts of the leaf. Blue copper larvae are shaped like sowbugs or woodlouses. Their color ranges from dull blue to green, which helps the caterpillar to blend in with its surroundings and increase its chance of survival. Depending on their location, some larvae have either a light yellow or white lateral line. Their heads are a brownish color. The caterpillar goes through four instars before pupating.

=== Pupa ===
The pupa is green with different shades of green on the outside. On the dorsal side of the pupa is a green line with lateral markings of green. This green coloration allows the pupa to blend in with its surrounding and increase its chances of survival.

=== Adult ===
After emerging from the chrysalis, females begin their search for a high quality host plant for larvae. Males begin their search for females to mate with.

== Migration ==
Blue coppers are not known to migrate. However, they can fly as far as one kilometer in distance.

== Enemies ==
The blue copper has no known enemies. However, the species is decreasing in certain parts of California because of the increase in fires that burn down the trees in the open forest where these butterflies reside.

== Mating ==
As the females come out of their pupas they release a pheromone that attracts the males to where they are. The males show off their wing colors because the female will prefer the male with the best wing coloration. To increase their mating success, the males try to be the first male that the females sees.

== Mutualism ==
Some larvae in California have been reported to be facultatively myrmecophilous because they have been observed in association with Formica francoeuri Bolton, an ant species formerly known as F. pilicornis Emery. This means that the Lycaena heteronea larvae are benefitting from the presence of the ants.

== Conservation ==
The Nature Conservancy Global Rank of Lycaena heteronea is G5. This ranking indicates that the species is abundant and secure from a conservation standpoint but it may be rare in certain parts of its range. In southern California, its rank is T2, which means that its scarcity there makes it vulnerable to extirpation.
