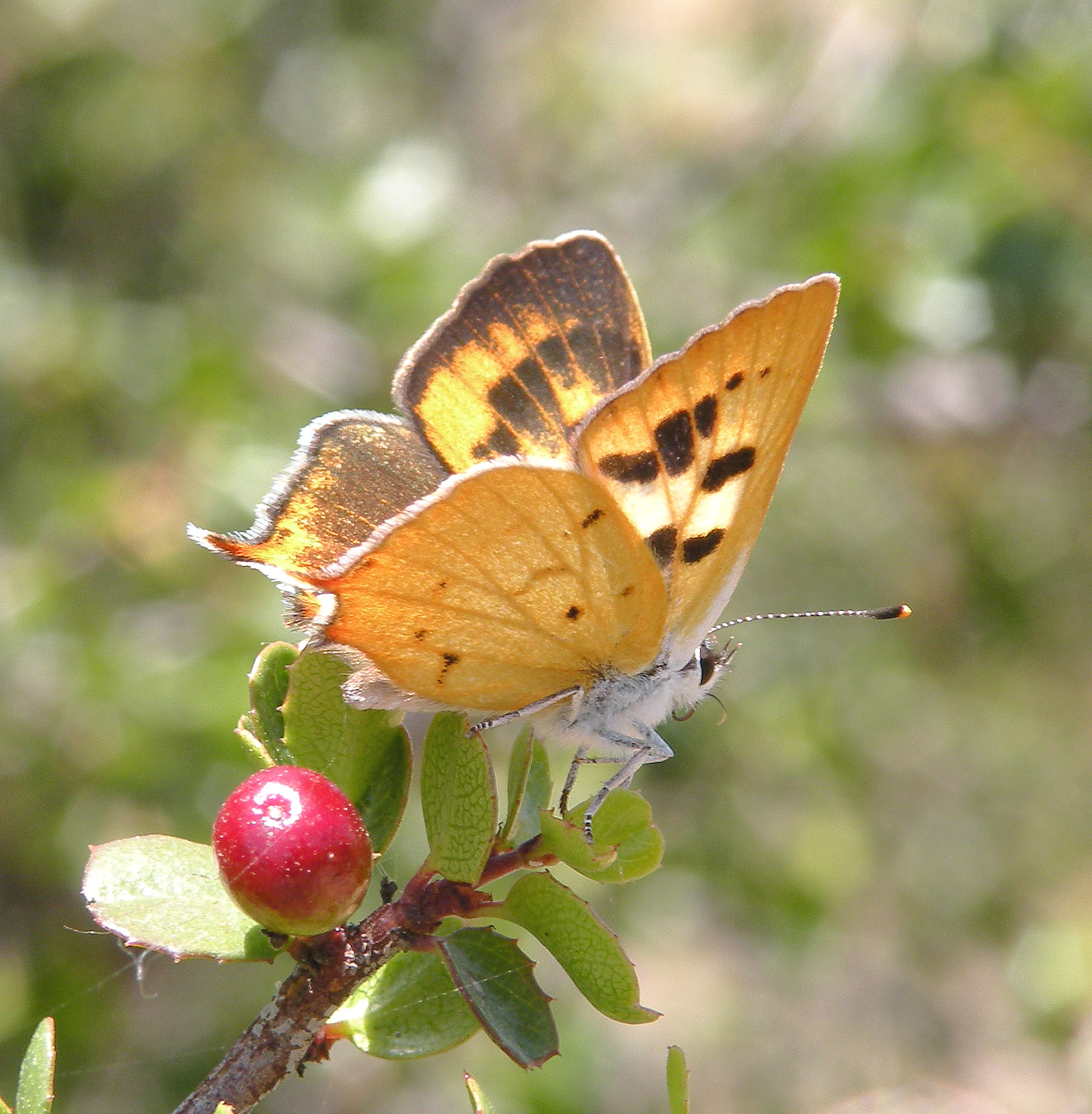

Conservation status
- Vulnerable (IUCN 2.3)

- Threatened (ESA)

Scientific classification
- Kingdom: Animalia
- Phylum: Arthropoda
- Class: Insecta
- Order: Lepidoptera
- Family: Lycaenidae
- Genus: Lycaena
- Species: L. hermes

Binomial name
- Lycaena hermes (W.H. Edwards, 1870)
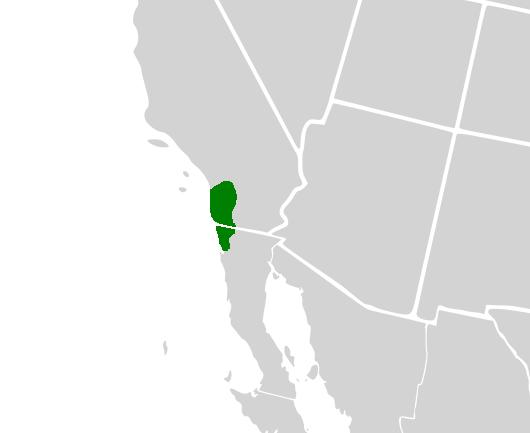

= Hermes copper =

Species of butterfly

Lycaena hermes, the Hermes copper, is a species of butterfly in the family Lycaenidae. It is found in Mexico and southern California in the United States. It is known from a small number of areas. Forest fires in the San Diego area in 2003 and 2007 destroyed most of the populations.

The habitat disturbance that occurred in 2003 and 2007 were two wildfires in San Diego, California, which led to the dispersal of the Hermes copper butterfly. Reconciliation was necessary in order to avoid extinction and negative impacts associated with inbreeding.

The wingspan is 25–32 mm.

The larvae feed on Rhamnus crocea.

The U.S. Fish and Wildlife Service declared the Hermes copper butterfly as a threatened species under the Endangered Species Act Monday, December 20, 2021. The agency also designated 35,000 acres in San Diego County as protected critical habitat.
