= Lycaena orus =

Western sorrel copper

Conservation status
- Least Concern (IUCN 3.1)

Scientific classification
- Kingdom: Animalia
- Phylum: Arthropoda
- Clade: Pancrustacea
- Class: Insecta
- Order: Lepidoptera
- Family: Lycaenidae
- Genus: Lycaena
- Species: L. orus

Binomial name
- Lycaena orus (Stoll, [1780])

Synonyms
- Papilio orus Cramer, 1780; Papilio arcas Fabricius, 1787

Species of butterfly

Lycaena orus, the western sorrel copper, is a butterfly of the family Lycaenidae. It is found only in South Africa (Eastern Cape Province, Western Cape Province). The habitat consists of fynbos at various altitudes, from sea level to montane regions.

The wingspan is 21–27 mm. The butterfly flies year-round, peaking in summer.

Larval food is Polygonum undulatum and Rumex lanceolatus.
