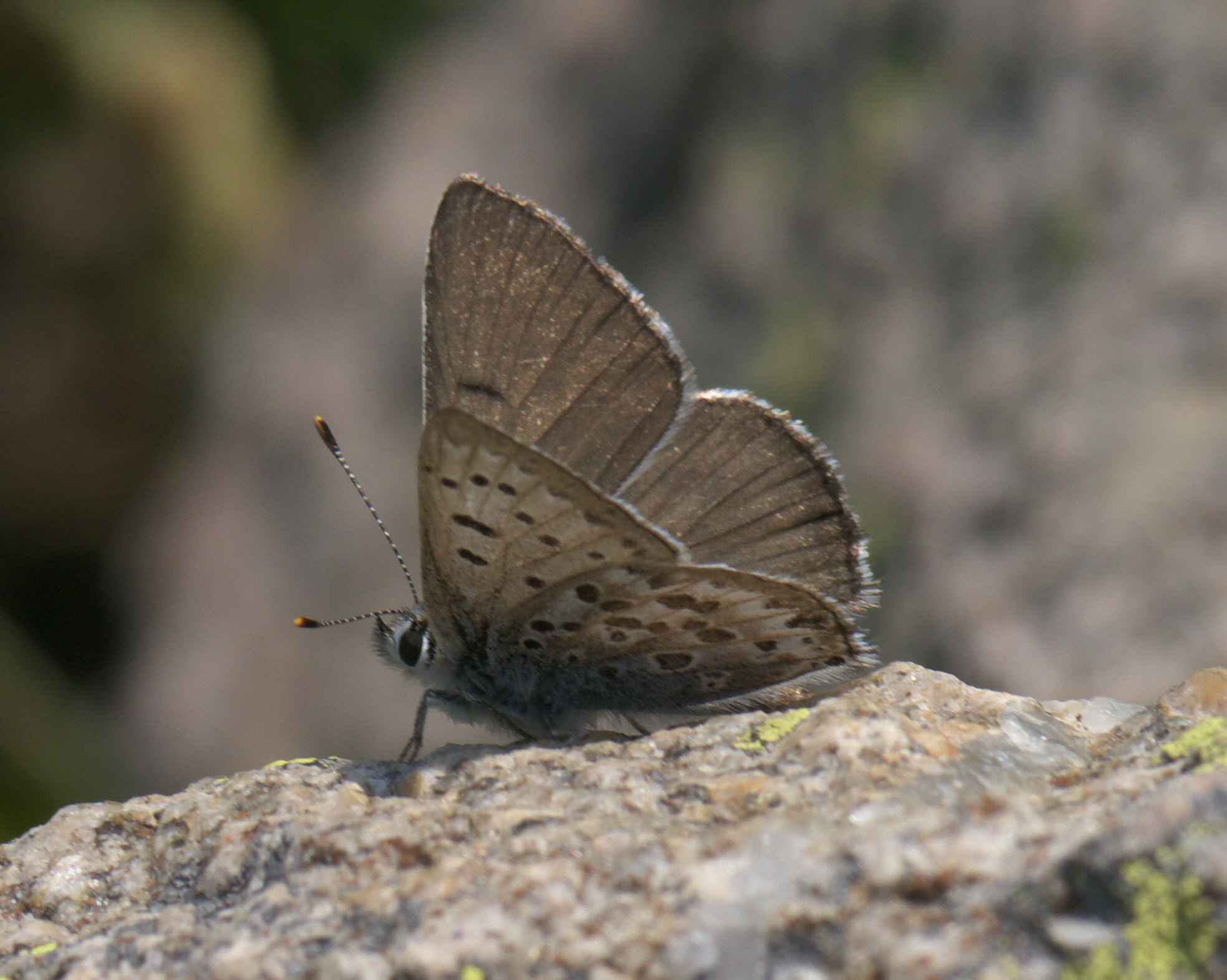

Conservation status
- Secure (NatureServe)

Scientific classification
- Kingdom: Animalia
- Phylum: Arthropoda
- Clade: Pancrustacea
- Class: Insecta
- Order: Lepidoptera
- Family: Lycaenidae
- Genus: Lycaena
- Species: L. editha

Binomial name
- Lycaena editha (Mead, 1878)

= Lycaena editha =

Species of butterfly

Lycaena editha, known generally as the Edith's copper or great gray copper, is a species of copper in the butterfly family Lycaenidae. It is found in North America.

The MONA or Hodges number for Lycaena editha is 4254.

== Subspecies ==
These six subspecies belong to the species Lycaena editha:

- Lycaena editha editha (Mead, 1878)
- Lycaena editha montana Field, 1936
- Lycaena editha obscuramaculata Austin, 1989
- Lycaena editha pseudonexa J. Emmel & Pratt in T. Emmel, 1998
- Lycaena editha vanduzeei Gunder, 1927
- Lycaena editha vurali Koçak, 1984
