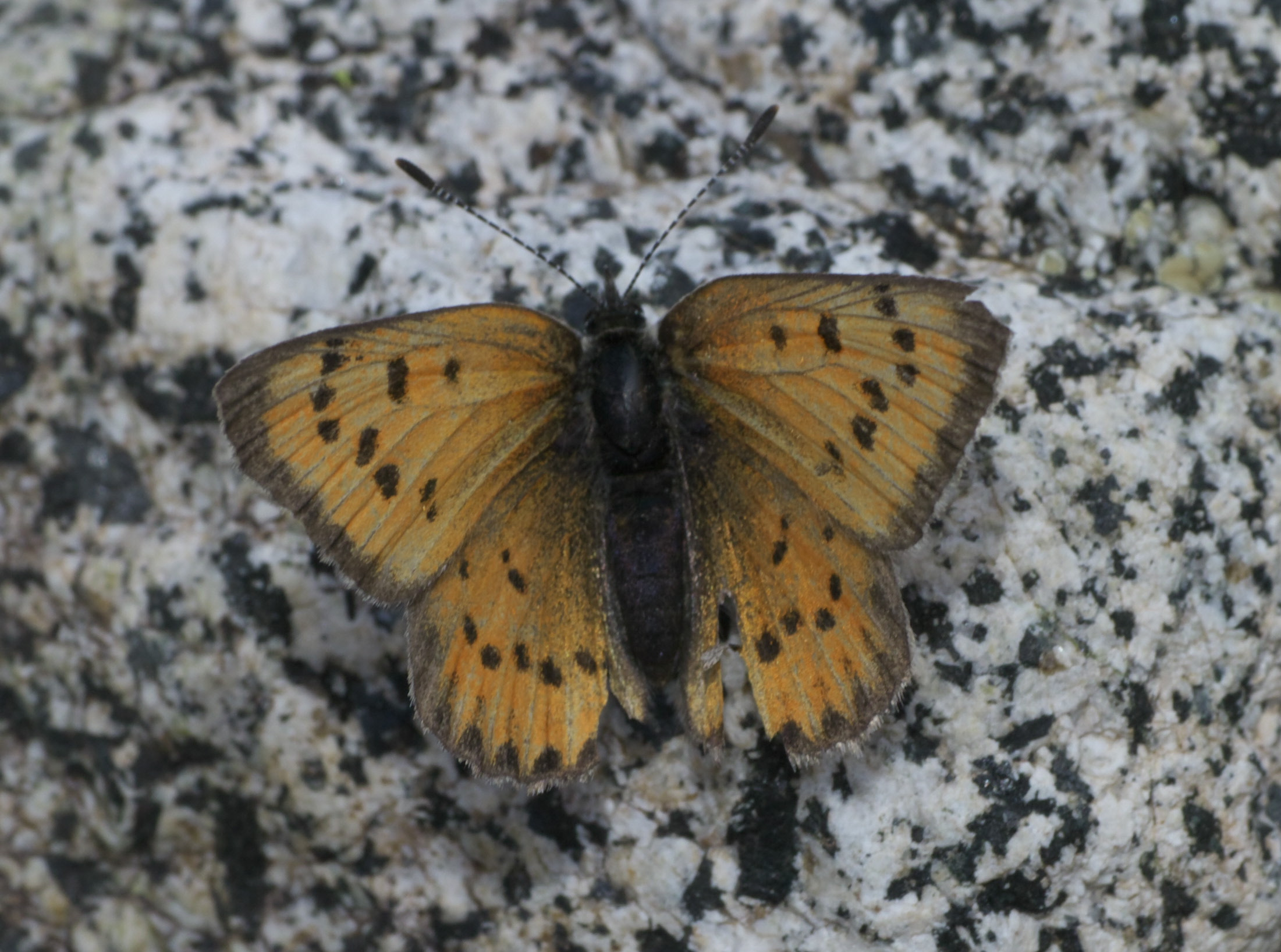

Conservation status
- Apparently Secure (NatureServe)

Scientific classification
- Domain: Eukaryota
- Kingdom: Animalia
- Phylum: Arthropoda
- Class: Insecta
- Order: Lepidoptera
- Family: Lycaenidae
- Genus: Lycaena
- Species: L. cuprea

Binomial name
- Lycaena cuprea (W. H. Edwards, 1870)

Synonyms
- Chalceria cupreus Dyar, 1903; Lycaena cupreus; Chrysophanus snowi Edwards, 1881

= Lycaena cuprea =

Species of butterfly

Lycaena cuprea, the lustrous copper, is a butterfly of the family Lycaenidae. It is found in the western mountains of North America.

The wingspan is 23–30 mm. Adults are on wing from mid-June to July or August. They feed on the nectar of Cirsium, Medicago sativa and Melilotus species.

The larvae feed on Oxyria digyna and Rumex species.

== Subspecies ==
- L. c. snowi (Edwards, 1881)
- L. c. henryae (Cadbury, 1937)
