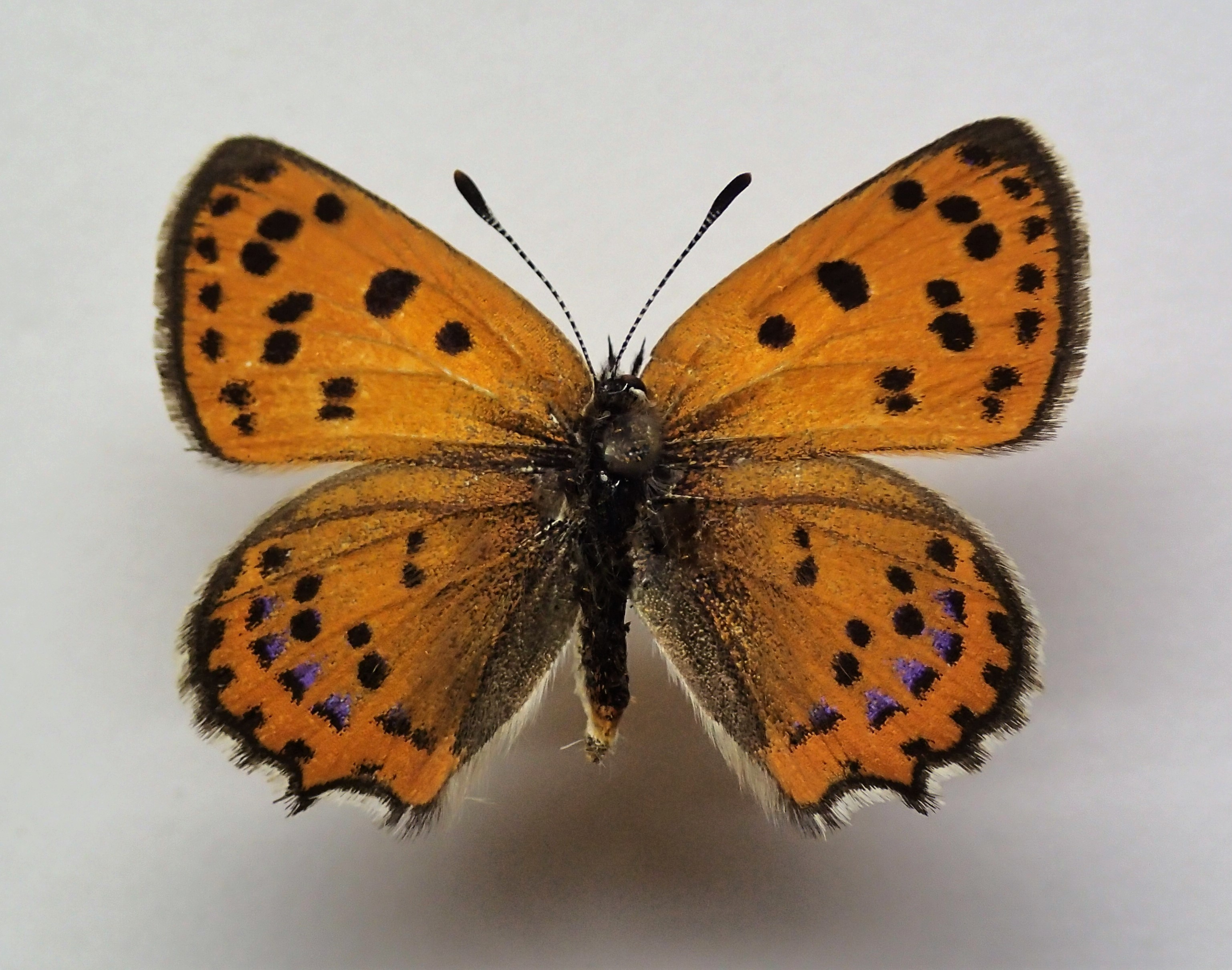

Scientific classification
- Kingdom: Animalia
- Phylum: Arthropoda
- Class: Insecta
- Order: Lepidoptera
- Family: Lycaenidae
- Genus: Lycaena
- Species: L. phoebus

Binomial name
- Lycaena phoebus (Blachier, 1905)

Synonyms
- Chrysophanus phoebus (Blachier, 1905); Thersamonia phoebus (Blachier, 1905)

= Lycaena phoebus =

Species of butterfly

Lycaena phoebus, the Moroccan copper, is a butterfly in the family Lycaenidae. It is endemic to the Atlas Mountains of Morocco. It flies according to the place from April to September or simply from August to September in a variable number of generations. Its host plant is Polygonum aviculare in the High Atlas and possibly Polygonum equisetiforme in the Anti-Atlas. The biotope is flowery meadow.
