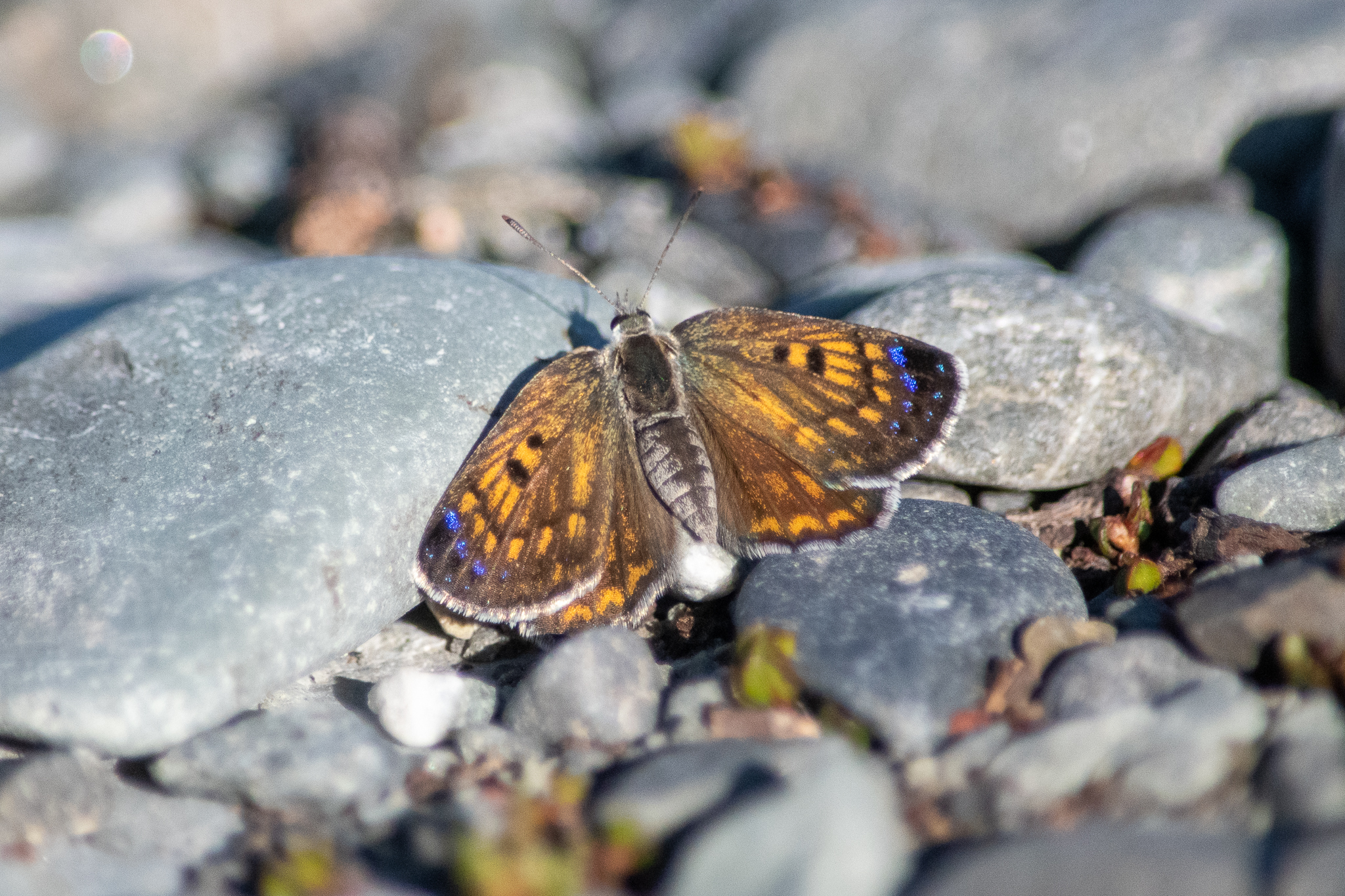

Scientific classification
- Domain: Eukaryota
- Kingdom: Animalia
- Phylum: Arthropoda
- Class: Insecta
- Order: Lepidoptera
- Family: Lycaenidae
- Genus: Lycaena
- Species: L. tama

Binomial name
- Lycaena tama Fereday 1878

= Lycaena tama =

Species of copper

Lycaena tama, the Canterbury alpine boulder copper, is a species of copper which lives on the central South Island of New Zealand.

== Description ==
A small butterfly with copper wings and a "marginal series of violet dots". It was named tama as a distinct species by R. W. Fereday after "a traditionary Maori chief of that name."

== Range ==
Lycaena tama lives in the Mackenzie Basin and in the areas around Canterbury. It was first described as being in and around "Drayton Station, on the plains near Mount Hutt; spurs of mountains near Castle Hill Station; and the top of the Mount Hutt range"

== Ecology ==
Lycaena tama uses the host plant pōhuehue.
