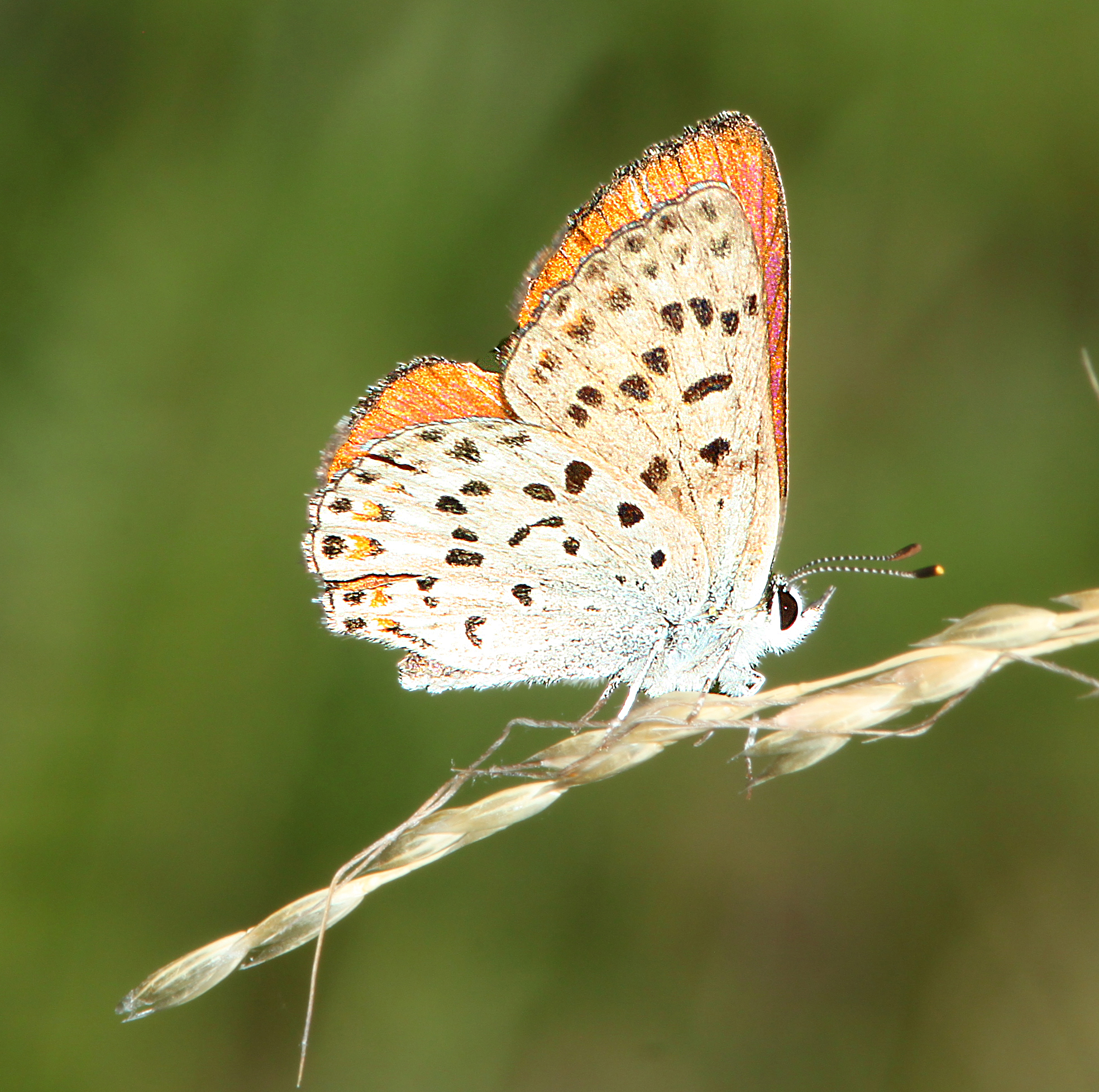

Conservation status
- Vulnerable (NatureServe)

Scientific classification
- Kingdom: Animalia
- Phylum: Arthropoda
- Clade: Pancrustacea
- Class: Insecta
- Order: Lepidoptera
- Family: Lycaenidae
- Genus: Lycaena
- Species: L. gorgon

Binomial name
- Lycaena gorgon (Boisduval, 1852)

= Lycaena gorgon =

Species of butterfly

Lycaena gorgon, known generally as the gorgon copper or stream water-crowfoot, is a species of copper in the butterfly family Lycaenidae. It is found in North America, mainly in California.

== Description ==
Undersides of wings for both sexes is whitish with black spots, with reddish-orange spots on hindwings close to the margin. The uppersides of males' wings are brown with purple sheen, while the upperside of female's wings are brown with yellow markings and black spots.

== Habitat and biology ==
This butterfly is found in foothills, including chaparral, woodland, and canyons. Its host plant is Eriogonum nudum, and adults feed on flowers of that plant in addition to a variety of others, including milkweed and Eriophyllum lanatum. There is a single annual brood lasting between March and July.

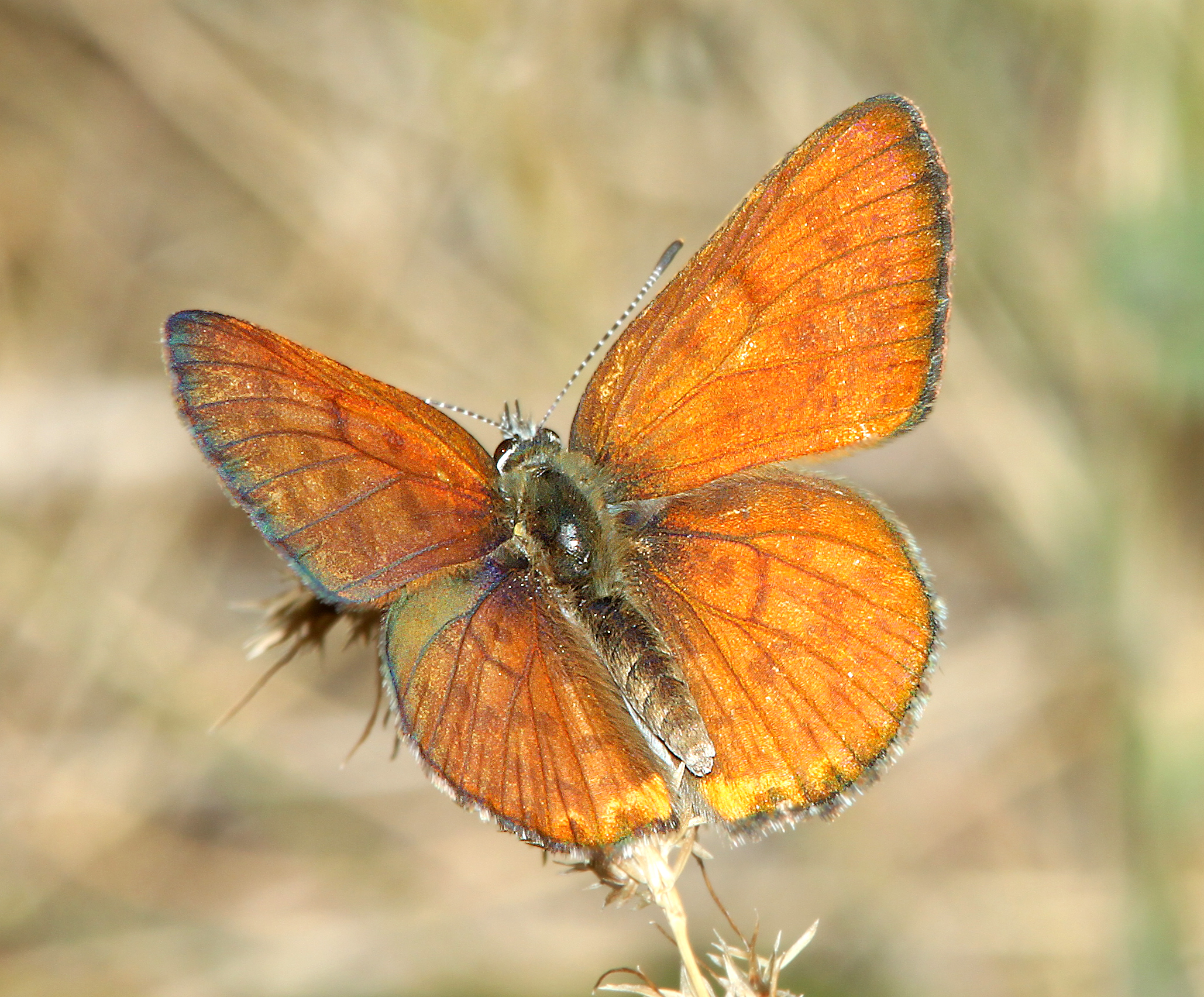
Gorgon copper, Lycaena gorgon

== Subspecies ==
These four subspecies belong to the species Lycaena gorgon:

- Lycaena gorgon dorothea J. Emmel & Pratt in T. Emmel, 1998
- Lycaena gorgon gorgon (Boisduval, 1852)
- Lycaena gorgon jacquelineae J. Emmel & Pratt in T. Emmel, 1998
- Lycaena gorgon micropunctata J. Emmel & Pratt in T. Emmel, 1998
