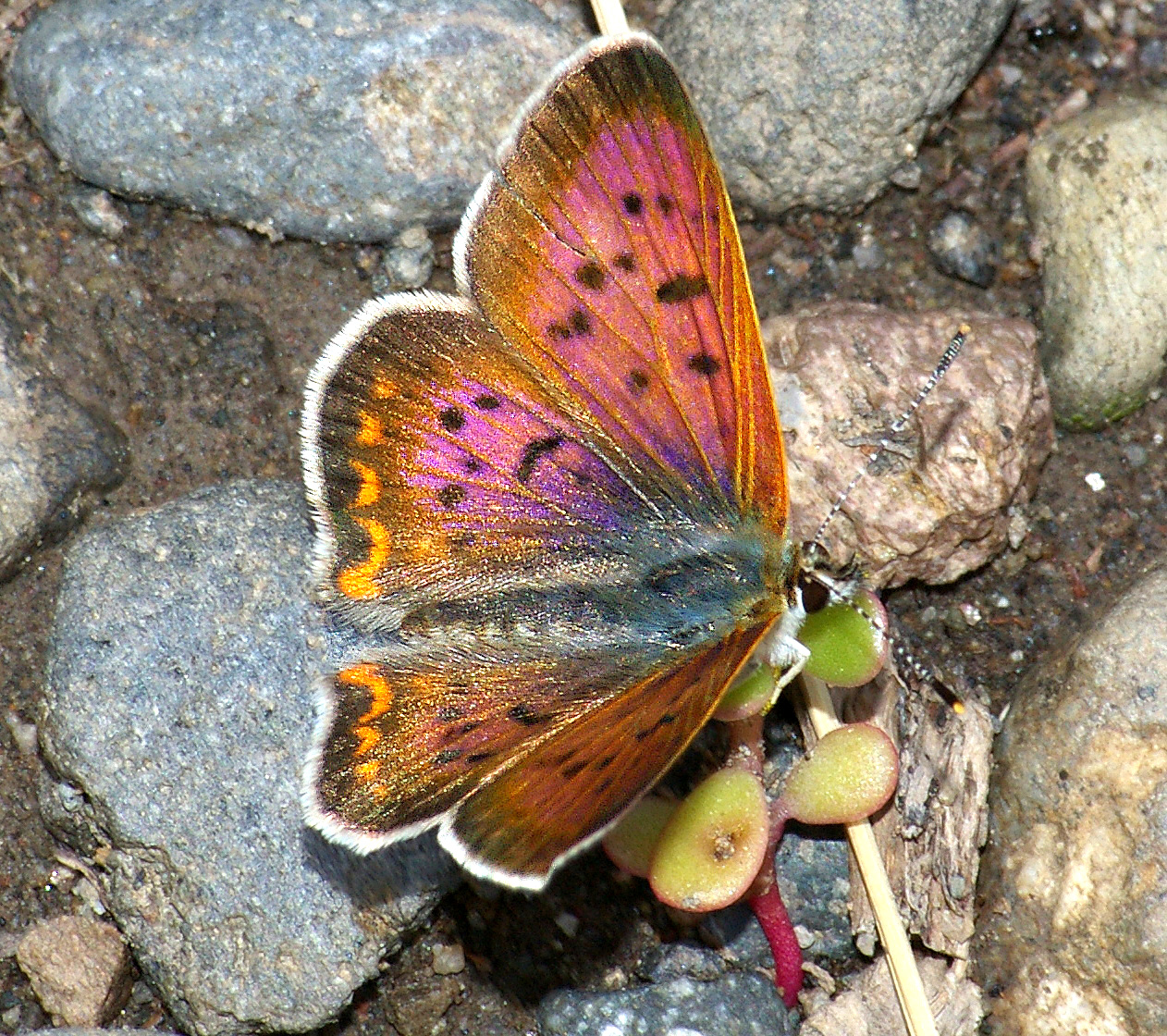
- Female

Conservation status
- Secure (NatureServe)

Scientific classification
- Domain: Eukaryota
- Kingdom: Animalia
- Phylum: Arthropoda
- Class: Insecta
- Order: Lepidoptera
- Family: Lycaenidae
- Genus: Lycaena
- Species: L. helloides

Binomial name
- Lycaena helloides (Boisduval, 1852)

Synonyms
- Polyommatus helloides Boisduval, 1852; Epidemia helloides; Lycaena xanthoides tr.f. gunderi Rudkin, 1933; Lycaena sternitzkyi Gunder, 1936

= Lycaena helloides =

Species of butterfly

Lycaena helloides, the purplish copper, is a butterfly of the family Lycaenidae. It is found in North America from the Great Lakes area to British Columbia, south to Baja California.

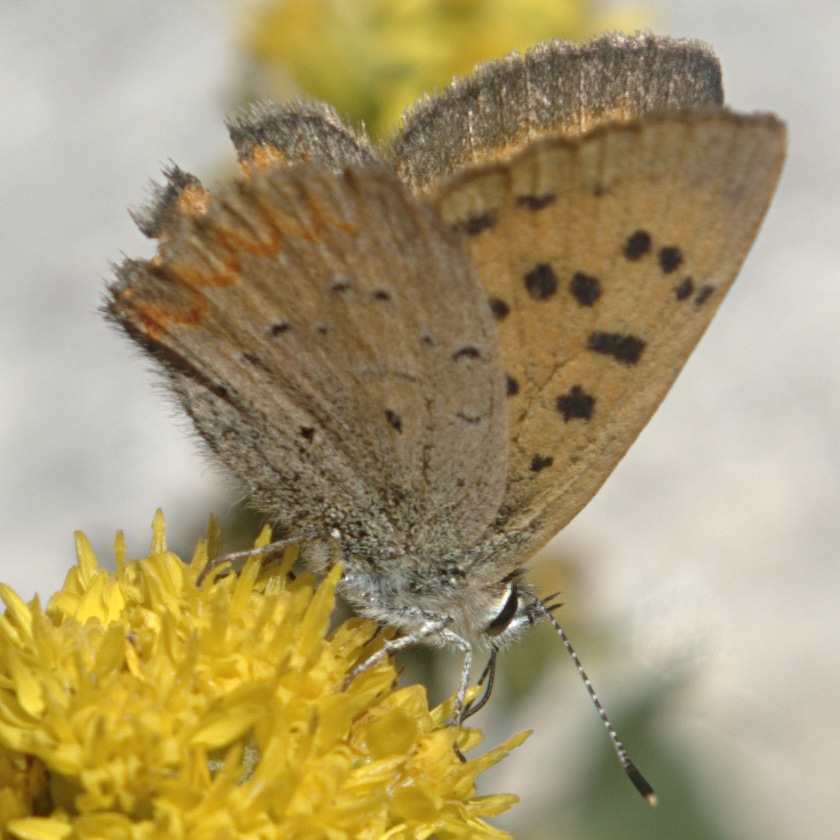
Female, underside

The wingspan is 30–38 mm. Adults are generally on wing from May to July and again from August to October in two generations per year, although up to four generations per year may occur at some locations. In the northern part of the range, there is one generation with adults on wing from July to August. Adults feed on flower nectar.

The larvae feed on the leaves of Polygonum, Rumex, and sometimes Potentilla species. The species overwinters as an egg.
