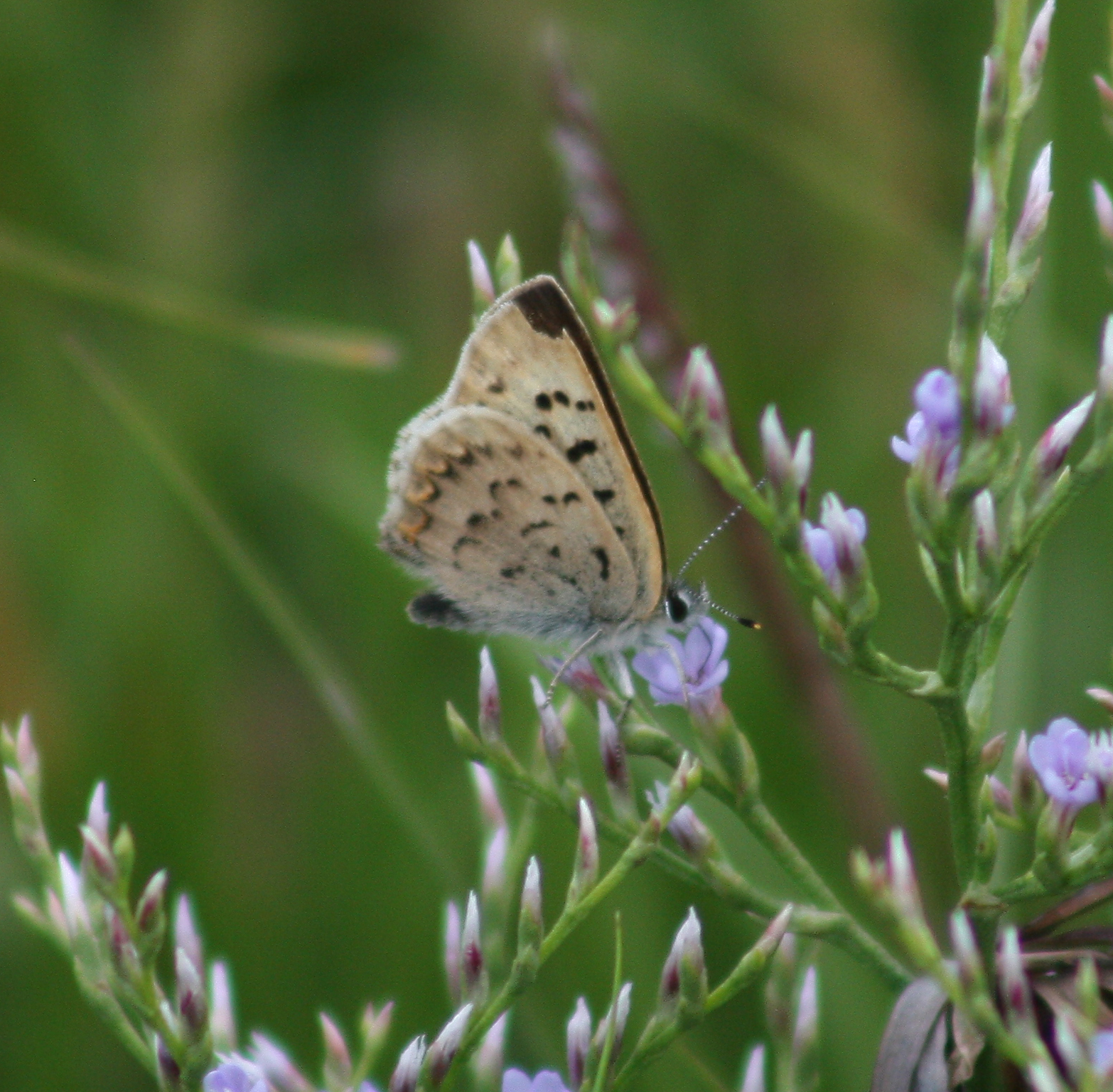

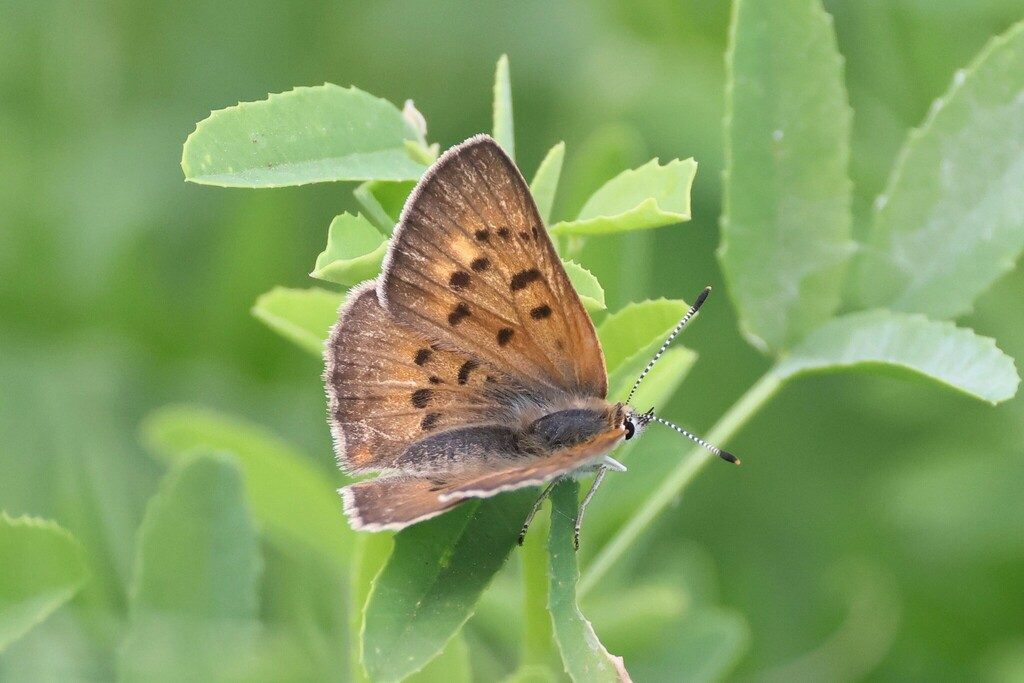

Conservation status
- Vulnerable (NatureServe)

Scientific classification
- Kingdom: Animalia
- Phylum: Arthropoda
- Clade: Pancrustacea
- Class: Insecta
- Order: Lepidoptera
- Family: Lycaenidae
- Genus: Lycaena
- Species: L. dospassosi

Binomial name
- Lycaena dospassosi McDunnough, 1940

Synonyms
- Lycaena dorcas dospassosi McDunnough, 1940; Tharsalea dospassosi (McDunnough, 1940)

= Lycaena dospassosi =

Species of butterfly

Lycaena dospassosi, the maritime copper or saltmarsh copper, is a species of butterfly belonging to the family Lycaenidae, which includes the coppers, the blues, the hairstreaks, the harvesters and related butterflies. This butterfly is endemic to eastern Canada.

== Taxonomy ==
Lycaena dospassosi was first formally described as Lacaena dorcas var dospassosi in 1940 by the Canadian entomologist James McDunnough with its type locality given as salt meadows north of Bathurst, New Brunswick in Canada. It is now regarded as a valid species, rather than a subspecies of L. dorcas, and is sometimes placed in the genus Tharsalea, although other authorities classify it within the subgenus Epidemia of Lycaena. The genus Lycaena is the type genus of the subfamily Lycaeninae of the family Lycaenidae.

== Etymology ==
Lycaena dospassosi is classified in the genus Lycaena, a name which appears to derived from the Greek λύκαινα (lúkaina), meaning "she-wolf". The specific name honours the American lepidopterist Cyril Franklin dos Passos.

== Description ==
Lycaena dospassosi has a larger wingspan at 25 to 31 mm (0.98 to 1.22 in) than the L. dorcas. The males are duller purple above with noticeably larger black spots on both the upper side and underside of the wings. The underside the forewing is pale yellowish-buff while that of the hindwing has a browner tinge. The submarginal band of crescent shaped markings on the underwing of the hindwing is yellow. Females are similar to males except that the upper side if the fore wings is brown with a partial yellow band beyond the postmedial row of black spots.

== Distribution and habitat ==
Lycaena dospassosi is endemic to eastern Canada where it is found in the eastern Quebec and the Maritime Provinces, occurring along the Gulf of St. Lawrence coasts of Quebec, New Brunswick, Nova Scotia and Prince Edward Island. Here it is only found on saltmarsh where Argentina egedei, its larval foodplant, grows.

== Biology ==
Lycaena dospassosi has its flight period in late July to mid-August. The larvae feed on silverweed (Argentina egedii) and the adults require the flowers of sea lavender (Limonium carolinianum) to nectar on. Although it has a localised distribution large numbers may bee seen at the sites where it occurs.
