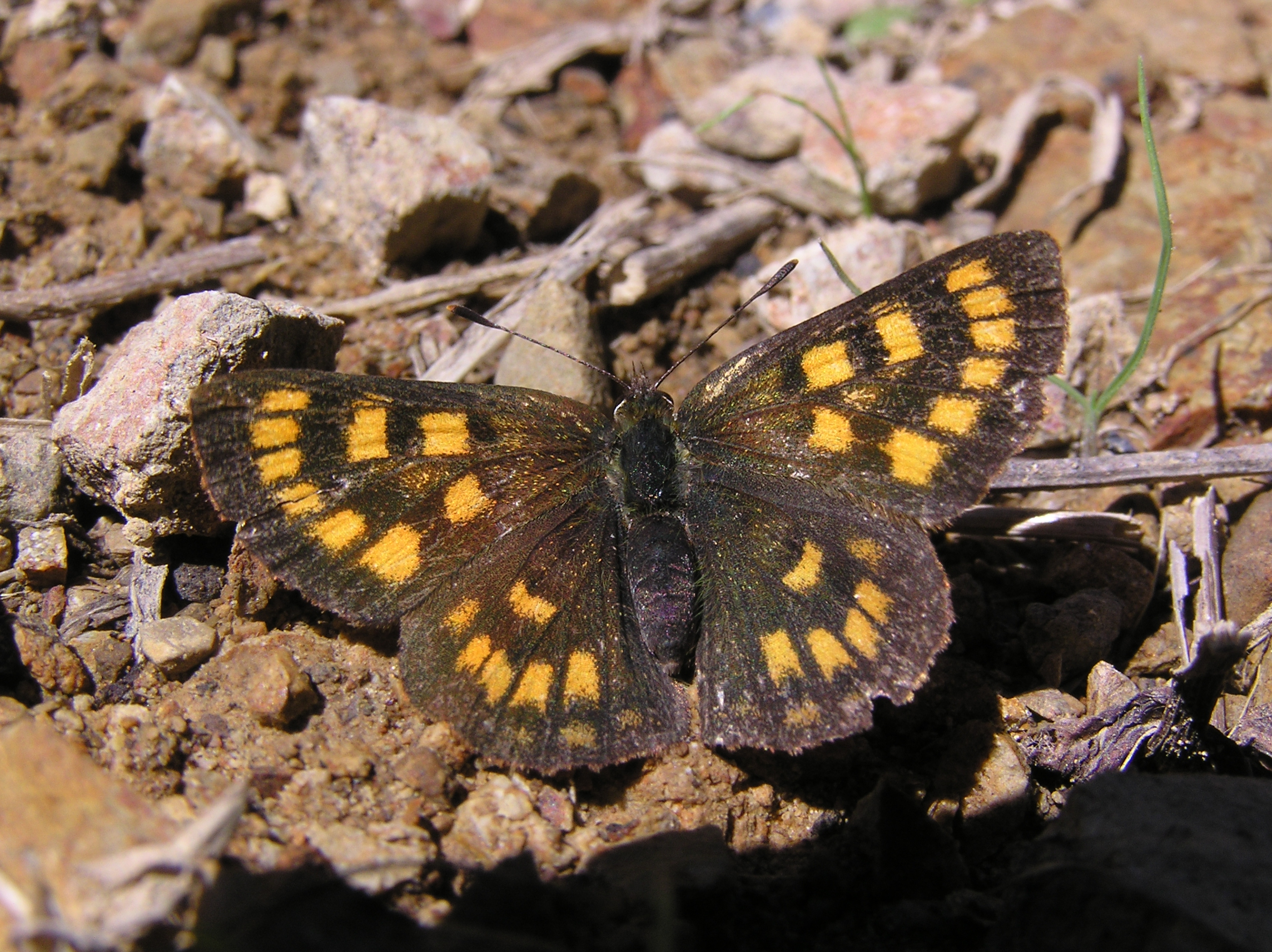

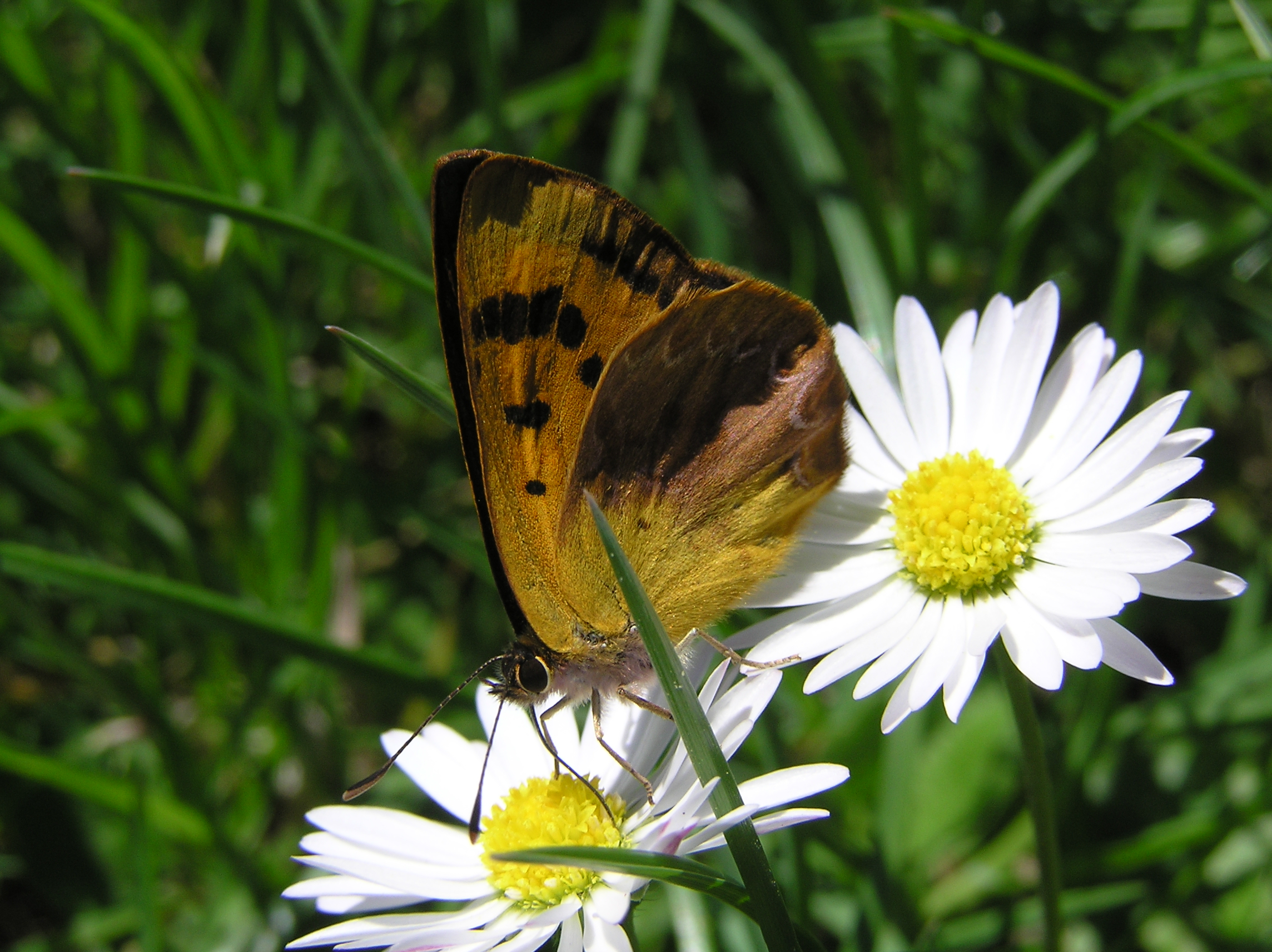

Scientific classification
- Kingdom: Animalia
- Phylum: Arthropoda
- Class: Insecta
- Order: Lepidoptera
- Family: Lycaenidae
- Genus: Lycaena
- Species: L. feredayi

Binomial name
- Lycaena feredayi (Bates, 1867)

Synonyms
- Chrysophanus feredayi Bates, 1867; Chrysophanus enysii Butler, 1876

= Lycaena feredayi =

Species of butterfly

Lycaena feredayi, the glade copper, is a butterfly of the family Lycaenidae. It is endemic to New Zealand.

The wingspan is 25–32 mm. Adults are on wing from November to December and from February to the beginning of April.

== Identification ==
=== Species description ===
Glade copper butterflies are primarily orange in colour with black outlines and lines on the wings. They have striped antennae as well as coloured edges of their wings. Between male and female sexes there is no noticeable physical distinction. They can only be differentiated by the shape of the abdomen observed in the field (Flux, 2012). Although at their younger stages they look identical, as opposed to the other species of Copper Butterflies, its wing patterns as well as its colouring do not vary much and remain fairly consistent (Gibbs 1980).

== Range ==
=== Natural global range ===
Glade Coppers are endemic to New Zealand (they are not naturally found elsewhere).

=== New Zealand range ===
As their common name would suggest, Glade Coppers usually reside in forest glades, along waterways and gullies throughout different locations in both the North and the South Islands of New Zealand (Hudson 1928, Gibbs 1961). Research show that they had been observed in most of the South Island and certain parts of the North: eastern side of the Dunstan Mts, Central Otago and Wellington (Craw 1974).

== Habitat ==
Due to host plant losses (plant that the larvae use to feed on), Glade Coppers don't appear as often or as common relative to their actual abundance in nature. Apart from forest glades, they can be found in various locations where their larval host plant grows (Gibbs 1961, Flux 1968). It is also a sedentary species, it has a small home range and never goes too far from the larvae food plant (Craw 1975).

== Ecology ==
=== Reproductive cycle ===
We can distinguish two phases during the Glade Copper reproductive cycle. The first brood takes place in late November and December. The eggs are laid near larvae food ( Craw 1975; Cowley 1983). The larvae emerge as butterflies in the same season. However, it seems that a part of those larvae doesn't pupate until after the winter. They will emerge during the second brood. In fact, in January some of the Glade copper larvae from the first brood pupate in January which results in the emergence of butterflies in February.

The second brood is in February–March. The same schema is observed. Some of the larvae from the eggs pupate during the two months period. Other will wait to emerge during the first brood of the next season (Craw 1975)

=== Life cycle/Phenology ===
Glade Coppers, much like all other kinds of butterflies, has 4 stages in their life cycle. Each stage has different physical traits and transformations and each server different purposes in its life.

- Ovum: initially in the form of an egg, during this stage they are located on the underside of foodplant leaves (Gibbs 1961). The act of laying eggs on the undersides of foodplants is called oviposition (Craw 1974). Females walk along the stem of the plant and oviposit on the old leaves, 5–10 cm from the young growth. The eggs are laid in the centre of the leaf, never too close (between 0,5 and 6 mm) from the leaf edge. Females were usually observed laying one egg per leaf, even though several eggs can be found on one leaf. This can be dued to several females laying an egg on the same leaf.
- Larvae: when hatched from the egg, it emerges yellow-green looking. After it starts to feed, they turn leaf-green with small white spots and reddish hair. The mid-dorsal line is reddish-brown. Even though their only recorded larval food plant is the Pohuehue, it is highly likely the larvae will feed on other species of Pohuehue too. The larvae live for about 6 weeks with 4 instars (period of its life it sheds its skin). From first to third instar larvae chew small round holes on the undersides of leaves. In the fourth (and final) instar, leaf margins are attacked (Cowley 1983).
- Pupa (6th and final instar): at this stage, they turn reddish brown and grow greenish brown wing cases with a pale brown eye. From here they hide within a tent of leaves held together by silk, forming a cocoon. Because of the stiff hairs they have on their body, Glade Coppers have a rough texture. Pupation occurs when they attach themselves to the foodplant by their cremaster (hind part they use to hang from) and it takes roughly 17 days but could very well be longer. While they are in this stage, they can be hard to find in the wild.
- Imago: This is the final lifestage of a butterfly also known as the flying stage. Unlike other adult Coppers, Glade Coppers have much heavier darker markings on their wings. Their wingspan is 25-32mm (Cowley 1983) They also have no differentiation in their forms between genders. Males have long and narrow abdomens while the females have a short and swollen one. The estimated average life expectancy is 7 days (Craw 1975).

When mating, a male Glade Copper would flutter a lot more rapidly in many directions frequently stopping when courting females. Unfortunately, no detailed studies and observations on courtship have been seen within this species. Inter-specific encounters between other copper butterflies have been observed to be a mechanism to help maintain habitat selection (Craw 1974).

=== Diet and foraging ===
Like the other Copper butterflies, Glade Coppers feed as well as lay their eggs Muehlenbeckia australis (Hudson 1928), otherwise known as Pohuehue, a climbing plant native to New Zealand. Wherever it grows, high chances are one could find a Glade Coppers habitat. To some extent, we could say that the presence of these butterflies is highly influences by the flowering seasons of their foodplant according to observed flowering periods coinciding with butterfly brood periods (Craw 1974). They are however considered to be curious butterflies as they will go out and investigate what other butterflies or species do if approached or if their habitat is entered.

The male and female feeding behaviour are different from one another. On one hand, the male feeds quickly at an inflorescence and then often flies up to 2m before feeding again. Feeding usually alternates with basking, courtship, etc. On the other hand, the female takes more time to feed and flies directly to the nearest inflorescence to feed further. They can feed continuously for 5-30 min (Craw 1975).

=== Predators, Parasites, and Diseases ===
All Copper butterfly's population density suffers from Wasp predation (paper wasps mostly) as, for the wasp's larvae, they are a good source of protein. In its larvae stage, there have been reports of parasitism from certain types of Ichneumonids (Gibbs 1961). The larvae kill the host by feeding either internally or externally while they are getting ready to pupate (Hawkinson 2005). Further studies of this species are needed to have concrete observations.

== Other information ==
Like many other butterflies, the Glade Copper flies in sunshine. The glade copper butterfly flies when it is between 730 and 1800 hours. The flight behaviour of males and females can be distinguished. The male of flies fast in a zig-zag fashion, frequently stopping to bask, feed or court females. The flight of the female is slower and more linear than the male's one.

The Glade Copper is part of the Copper butterflies species, a species of butterfly that to this day still have areas of their lifespan to be studied. Presently, all Copper Butterfly studies as well as new in field observations are being reviewed for re-classification. Recent environmental research websites suggest that the Glade Copper is likely to be split into 2 species.

== See also ==
- Butterflies of New Zealand
