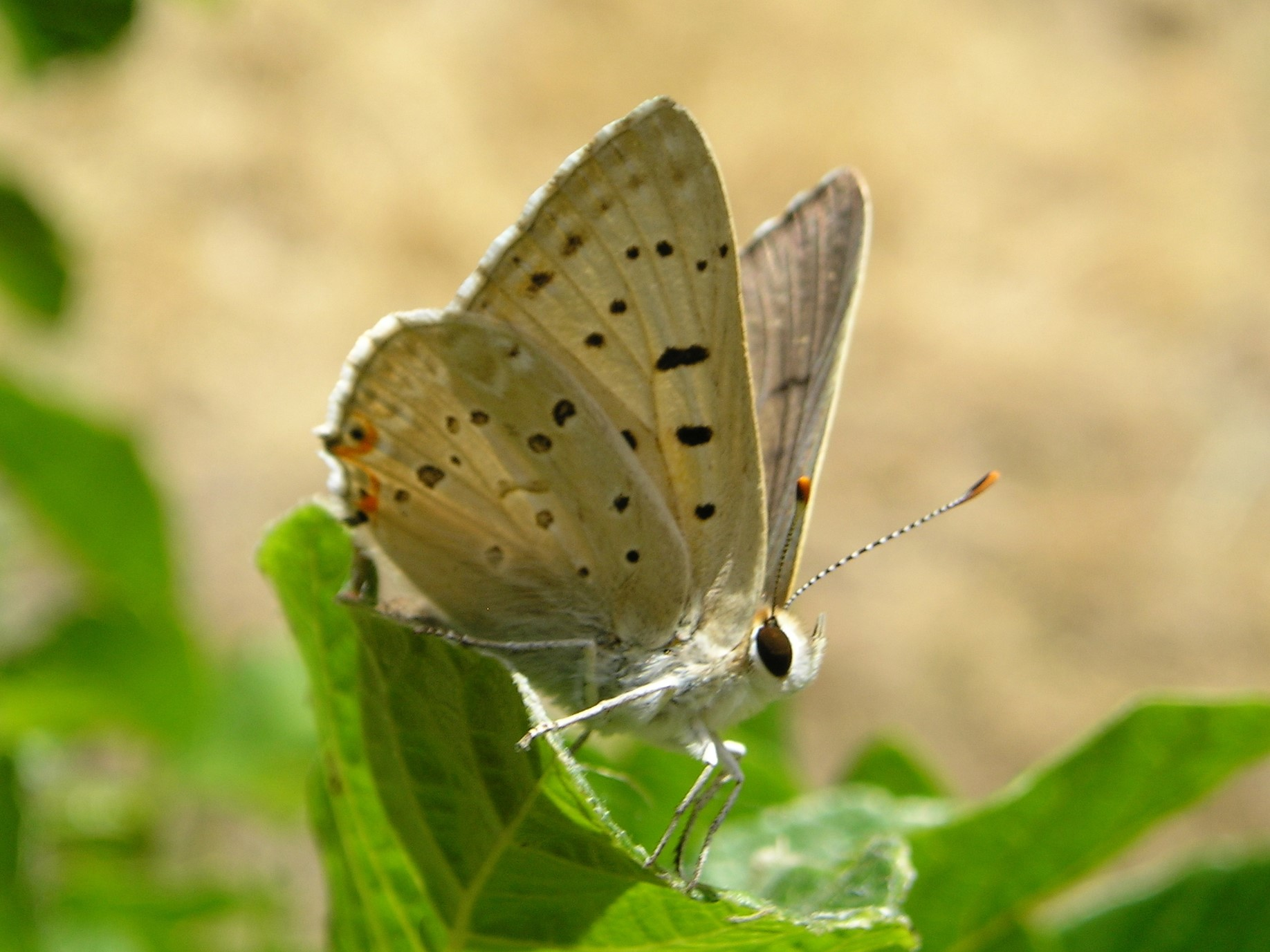

Conservation status
- Vulnerable (NatureServe)

Scientific classification
- Domain: Eukaryota
- Kingdom: Animalia
- Phylum: Arthropoda
- Class: Insecta
- Order: Lepidoptera
- Family: Lycaenidae
- Genus: Lycaena
- Species: L. xanthoides

Binomial name
- Lycaena xanthoides (Boisduval, 1852)

Synonyms
- Tharsalea xanthoides

= Lycaena xanthoides =

Species of butterfly

Lycaena xanthoides, the great copper, is a species of copper in the butterfly family Lycaenidae. It is found in North America.

== Subspecies ==
These three subspecies belong to the species Lycaena xanthoides:

- Lycaena xanthoides nigromaculata J. Emmel & Pratt in T. Emmel, 1998
- Lycaena xanthoides obsolescens J. Emmel & Pratt in T. Emmel, 1998
- Lycaena xanthoides xanthoides (Boisduval, 1852)
