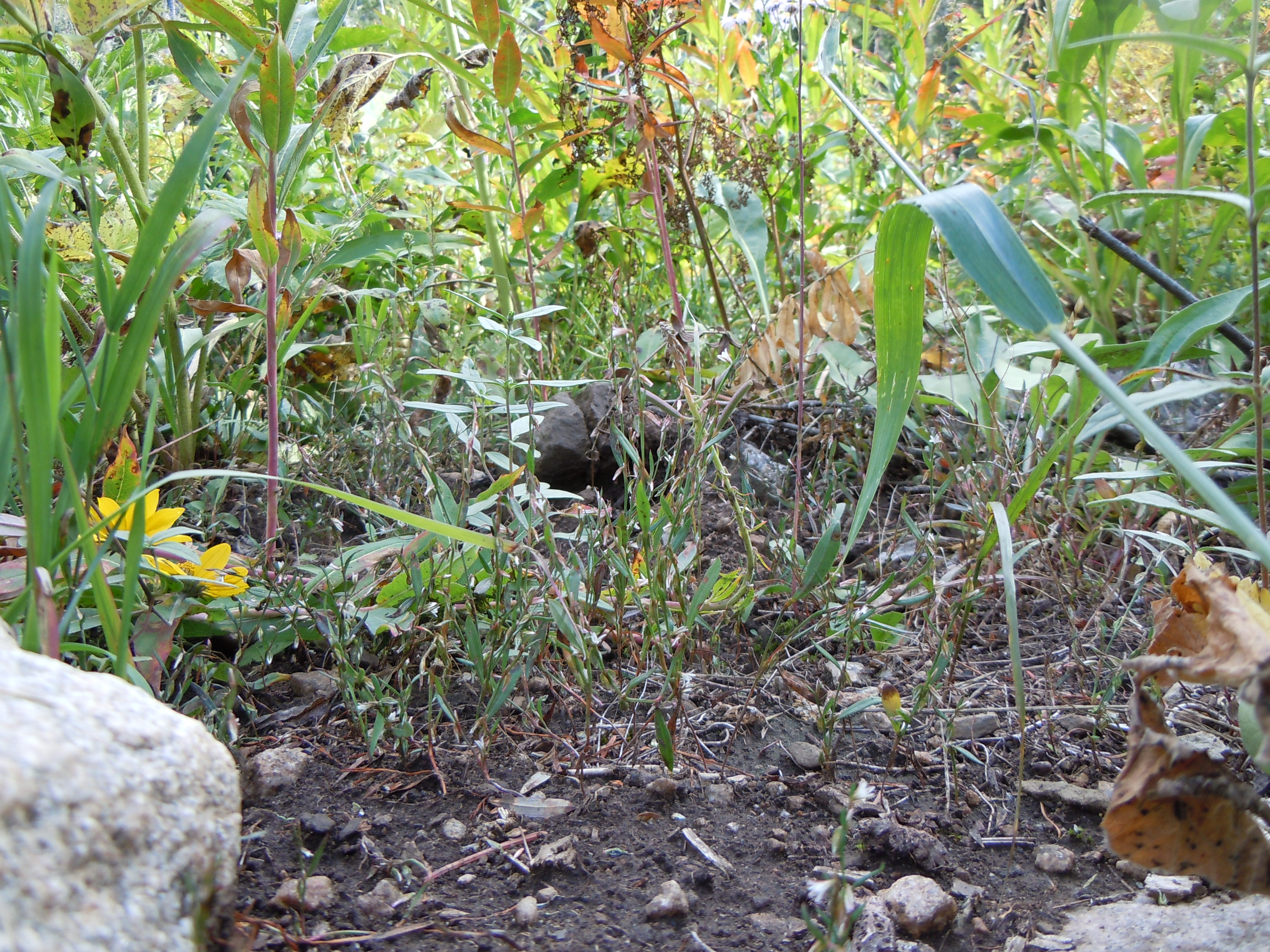

Scientific classification
- Kingdom: Plantae
- Clade: Tracheophytes
- Clade: Angiosperms
- Clade: Eudicots
- Order: Caryophyllales
- Family: Polygonaceae
- Genus: Polygonum
- Species: P. douglasii

Binomial name
- Polygonum douglasii Greene 1885

Synonyms
- Polygonum montanum (Small) Greene; Polygonum tenue S. Wats. 1880 not Michx. 1803

= Polygonum douglasii =

Species of flowering plant

Polygonum douglasii is a species of flowering plant in the knotweed family known by the common name Douglas's knotweed. It is native to much of northern and western North America, where it can be found in many types of habitat, including disturbed areas. It has been found in Canada from British Columbia north to Yukon and east as far as Québec, and in the United States as far south as California, New Mexico, Iowa, and New York.

Polygonum douglasii is known as a species complex, as there are many subspecies that may be better treated as species in their own right.

Polygonum douglasii is variable in morphology and the subspecies are often difficult to distinguish. In general, plants in this complex are annual herbs growing erect to maximum heights anywhere between 3 and 80 centimeters (1.2–32 inches) with thin, angular stems. High-elevation plants are smaller and sometimes trailing on the surface of the ground. The leaves are linear or widely lance-shaped, sometimes falling away to leave the plant mostly naked in flowering, or reduced to tiny scales at the stem tips. The flowers are a few millimeters long, pink to white, sometimes remaining closed or opening together in a cluster.
