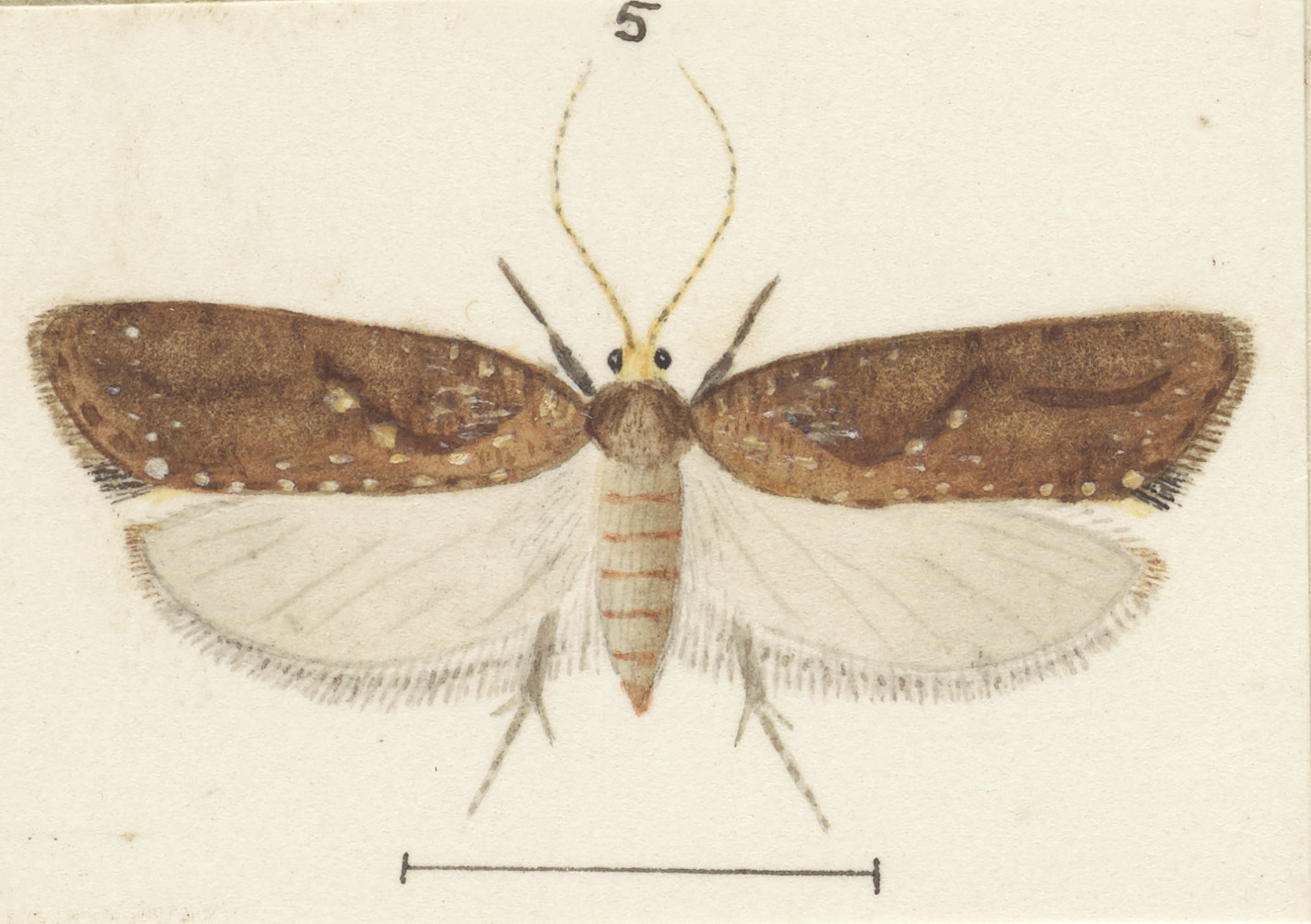
- Illustration of female

Scientific classification
- Kingdom: Animalia
- Phylum: Arthropoda
- Class: Insecta
- Order: Lepidoptera
- Family: Plutellidae
- Genus: Orthenches
- Species: O. prasinodes

Binomial name
- Orthenches prasinodes Meyrick, 1885

= Orthenches prasinodes =

Species of moth endemic to New Zealand

Orthenches prasinodes is a moth of the family Plutellidae. It was first described by Edward Meyrick in 1885. This species is endemic to New Zealand and has been observed in both the North and South Islands in the Wellington, Canterbury and Southland regions. It inhabits native forest. The larval host are species in the genus Muehlenbeckia and larvae have been raised on Muehlenbeckia complexia. Adults are on the wing from December until March.

== Taxonomy ==
This species was first described by Edward Meyrick in 1885 using a specimen collected in March at Riccarton Bush in Christchurch. Meyrick gave a more detailed description in 1886. George Hudson discussed and illustrated this species in his 1928 book The butterflies and moths of New Zealand. Hudson went on to give a description and illustration of the larva of this species in 1939. Dugdale considered this species when describing the genus Chrysorthenches. The male holotype specimen is held at the Natural History Museum, London.

== Description ==
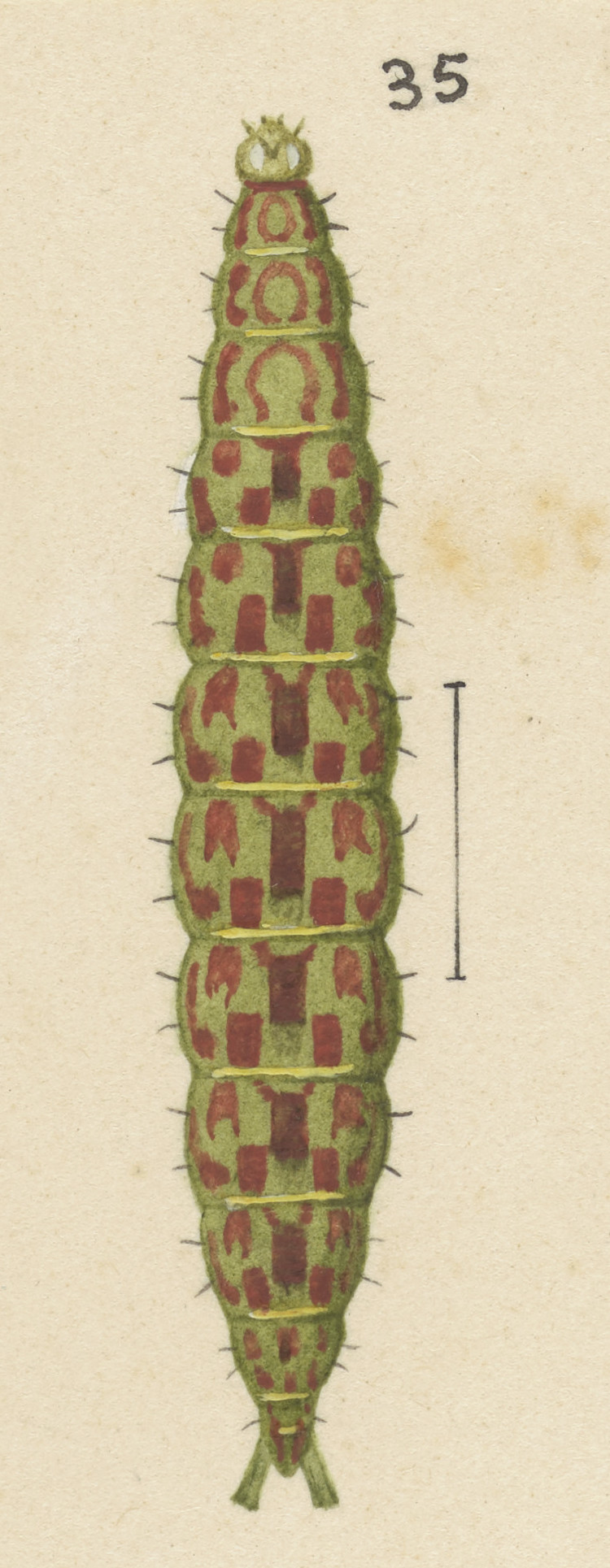
Hudson's illustration of larva.

Hudson described the larvae of this species as follows:

Length when full-grown about 1/2 inch (11 mm.). Cylindrical, slightly flattened, moderately stout, but strongly tapering at each end, especially posteriorly; segments deeply excised. Head small, ochreous-green; body grass green with darker dorsal stripe. Two or three days before spinning up the larva develops a rather complicated pattern of crimson markings as follows:—Segments 2, 3 and 4 each with an oval mark on midback; segments 5-11 inclusive with a rather long dull crimson bar on midback, and four shorter, more or less square crimson marks arranged on each side of this; segments 11 and 12 have a triangular dorsal mark; there is a very irregular broken lateral line on the sides of all segments except the head. The anal prolegs are long and conspicuously visible from above.

Meyrick described the adult male of this species as follows:

Male. — 14 mm. Head and antennae grey-whitish. Palpi moderately long, grey-whitish, second joint, except apex, and base of terminal joint dark fuscous, terminal joint somewhat longer than second. Thorax light greenish-grey, suffusedly mixed with dark grey. Abdomen grey-whitish. Legs dark fuscous, apex of joints and posterior tibiae grey-whitish. Fore-wings elongate, costa sinuate, apex and hindmargin rounded; light dull greenish, disc, inner and hind margins much suffused with dark grey, rest of wing indistinctly dotted with black, costa more distinctly; a small pale spot in dark suffusion below middle of fold; a small black spot in disc at 2/3, preceded by a pale longitudinal streak in disc : cilia grey, mixed with grey-whitish. Hindwings elongate-ovate, beneath with a long thin pecten of hairs from vein 1c directed towards disc; pale whitish-grey; cilia grey-whitish, with a dark grey spot at apex.

Hudson described the adults of this species as follows:

The expansion of the wings is 5/8 inch. The fore-wings are rather elongate with the apex and tornus rounded; yellowish-brown with numerous obscure pale ochreous dots along the dorsum and some of the veins and very faint purplish reflections; there is a very indefinite dark brown transverse shading before the middle; a streak before the apex and several darker dots on the termen and dorsum, The hind-wings are very pale greyish-ochreous, almost white.

Dugdale was of the opinion that externally the adults of this species are identical to O. vinitincta.

== Distribution ==
This specie is endemic to New Zealand. As well as its type locality, this species has been observed in the Wellington region and in Invercargill.

== Habitat and hosts ==
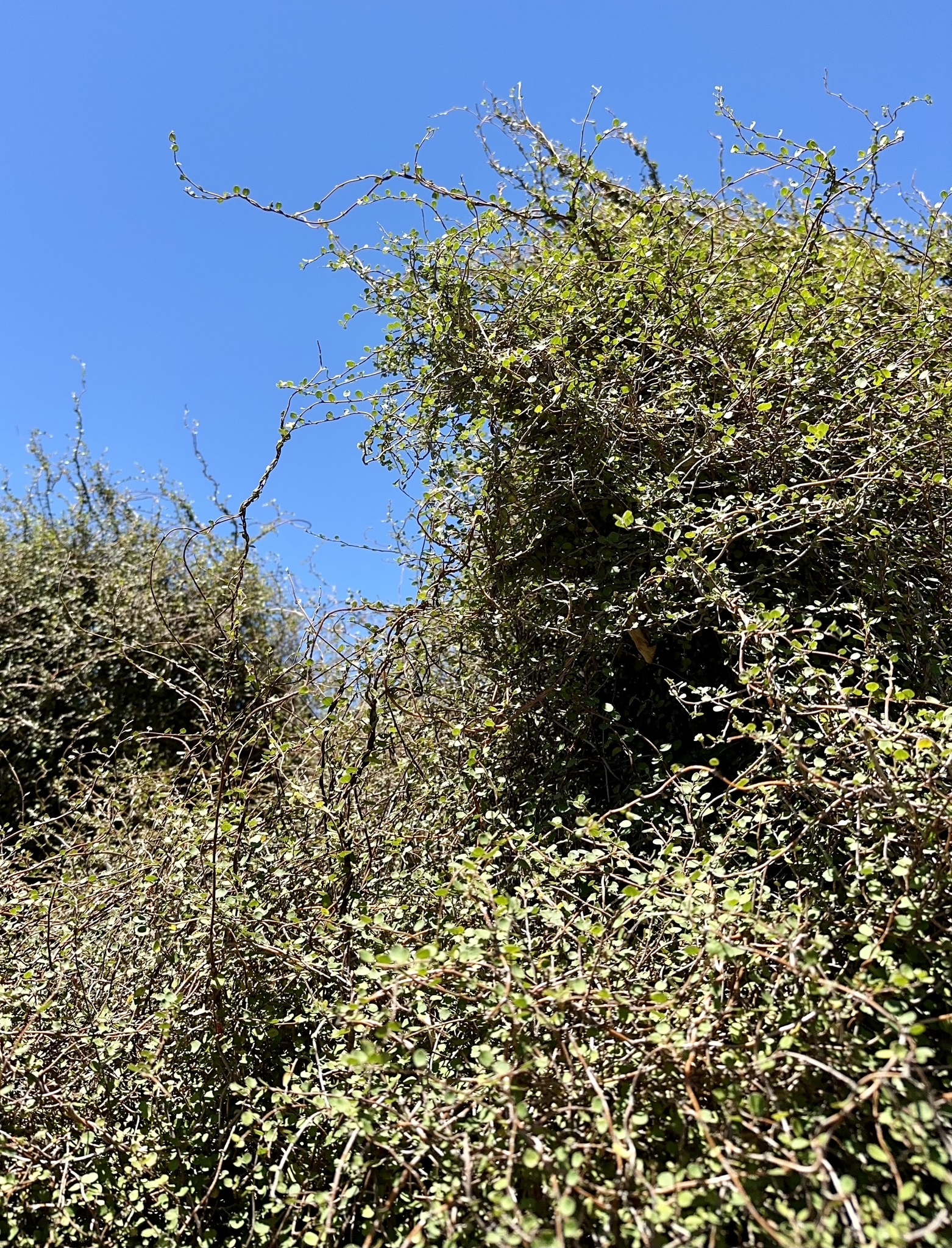
Larval host M. complexa.

O. prasinodes inhabits native forest. The larval host plant are species in the genus Muehlenbeckia. Larvae have been reared on Muehlenbeckia complexia.

== Behaviour ==
The larvae do not fold or twist the leaves of their host plant and are very active if disturbed. Adults are on the wing from December until March.
