= Polygonum heterophyllum =

Polygonum heterophyllum is a taxonomic name that is the botanical synonym of two species of plant:

- Muehlenbeckia complexa, synonym Polygonum heterophyllum Sol. ex Meisn. published in 1856 by Carl Daniel Friedrich Meisner (1800–1874)
- Polygonum aviculare, synonym Polygonum heterophyllum Lindm. published in 1912 by Carl Axel Magnus Lindman (1856–1928)
