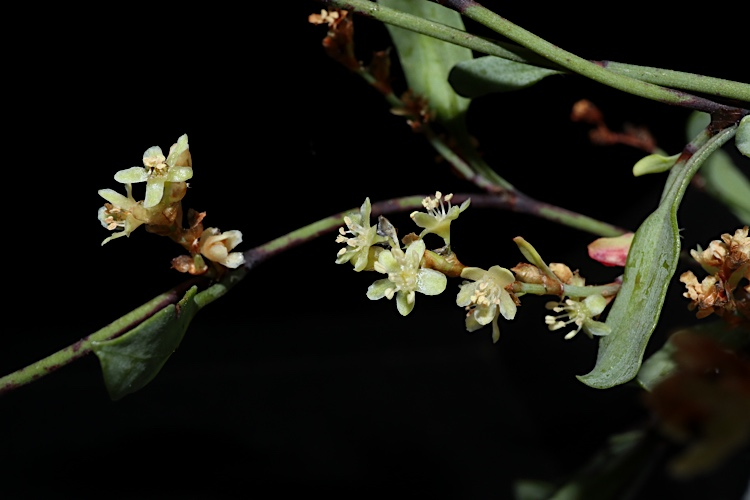
- M. tuggeranong with male flowers

Conservation status
- Endangered (EPBC Act)

Scientific classification
- Kingdom: Plantae
- Clade: Embryophytes
- Clade: Tracheophytes
- Clade: Angiosperms
- Clade: Eudicots
- Order: Caryophyllales
- Family: Polygonaceae
- Genus: Muehlenbeckia
- Species: M. tuggeranong

Binomial name
- Muehlenbeckia tuggeranong Mallinson

= Muehlenbeckia tuggeranong =

Species of plant

Muehlenbeckia tuggeranong, commonly known as Tuggeranong lignum, is a species of flowering plant in the family Polygonaceae. It is a low, sprawling shrub capable of developing into a wiry mass. M. tuggeranong is endemic to the Australian Capital Territory along the eastern bank of the Murrumbidgee River, south of Canberra. It is listed as Endangered under ACT legislation.

== Description ==
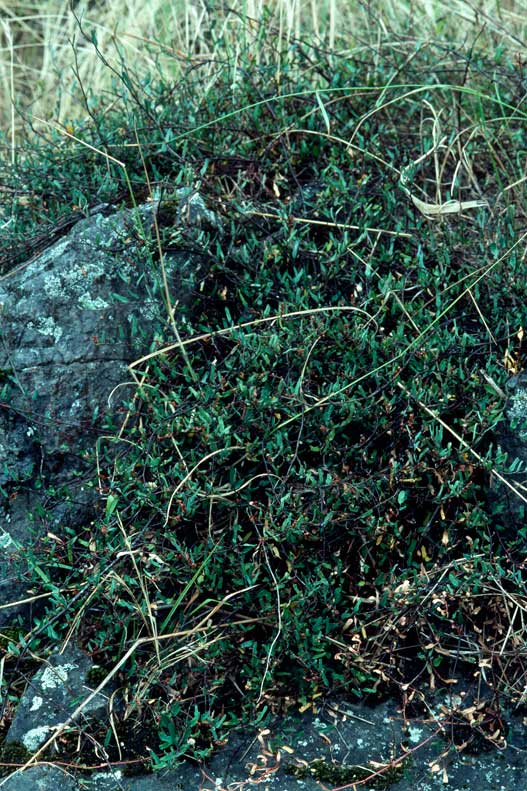
M. tuggeranong displaying its sprawling growth habit

Muehlenbeckia tuggeranong is a relatively small, sprawling shrub, forming a loose tangled mass of wiry stems up to approximately 1 m high and 1–2 m across. Its leaves are alternate glabrous (hairless) and relatively small (lamina 5-13 mm long, 2-4 mm wide). Its inflorescences are terminal, bearing cream-green-coloured flowers, which are typically unisexual but occasionally hermaphrodite. Whole plants are also typically dioecious, though occasionally exhibit hermaphroditism. The species is morphologically similar to M. axillaris, except that the latter is more consistently prostrate in its growth habit, and its inflorescences are typically axillary rather than terminal. M. axillaris is also not believed to occur in the Tuggeranong area where M. tuggeranong is found.

== Distribution and habitat ==
Muehlenbeckia tuggeranong has been found only on flood terraces of the eastern banks of the Murrumbidgee River Corridor, near the township of Tuggeranong, at the southern edge of the Canberra district. The plants grow on silty, sandy and gravelly soil or in the crevices of rocks bordering the river. The population's sole identified habitat is known to be periodically flooded.

== Conservation status ==
Muehlenbeckia tuggeranong is listed as endangered in the Australian Capital Territory under the Nature Conservation Threatened Native Species List (2025). One group of researchers describes it as “one of the rarest plants in Australia, [and] certainly the rarest in the Australian Capital Territory.” As of 1998, one year after the species was first described, only seven plants (six males, one female) had ever been found. In 2025, the wild population was still considered to comprise fewer than ten individuals. Furthermore, from speculations based on genetic data, it appears that there may remain no more wild females, and as few as four genetically distinct wild males.

Cuttings from both male and female plants have been successfully propagated at the Australian National Botanic Gardens (ANBG), where an ex-situ population is still maintained. Wild individuals have never been observed to produce seed; however, after 2022, workers at the ANBG have been able to successfully induce cultivated plants into producing fertile seed. Threats to the wild population are considered to include: damage from visitors to the site (e.g. trampling); competition from aggressively invasive species such as Hypericum perforatum (St John's wort) and Eragrostis curvula (African lovegrass); and low genetic diversity, resulting in a reduced capacity for environmental adaptation as well as a higher likelihood of inbreeding depression.
