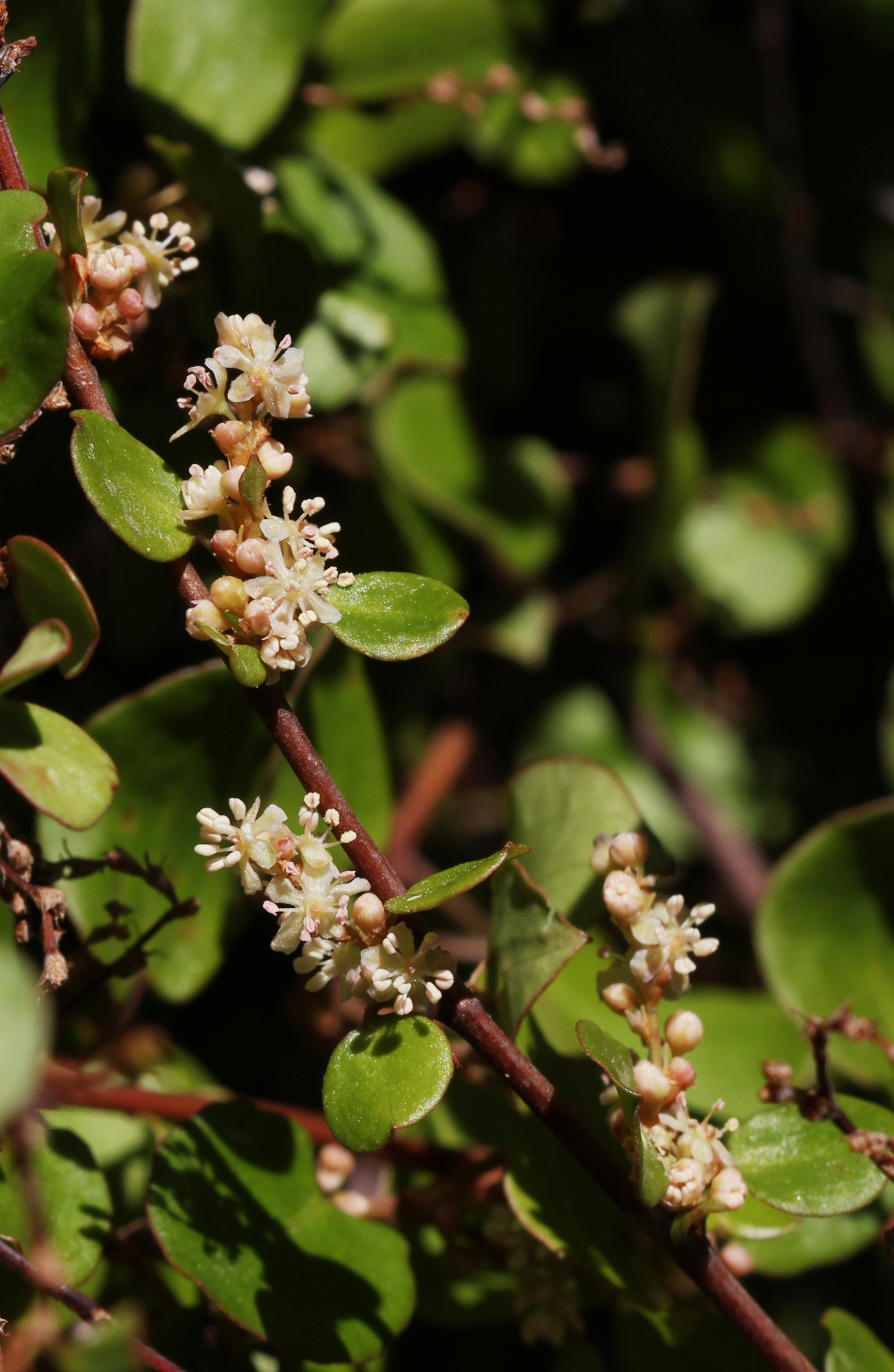

Scientific classification
- Kingdom: Plantae
- Clade: Tracheophytes
- Clade: Angiosperms
- Clade: Eudicots
- Order: Caryophyllales
- Family: Polygonaceae
- Genus: Muehlenbeckia
- Species: M. complexa

Binomial name
- Muehlenbeckia complexa (A.Cunn) Meisn.

= Muehlenbeckia complexa =

Species of flowering plant

Muehlenbeckia complexa is a plant commonly known as pohuehue (Māori: pōhuehue), although this name also applies to some other climbers such as Muehlenbeckia australis.

== Description ==
Muehlenbeckia complexa is one of 50 species of shrubs that are divided into 21 family groups known to be divaricate, with interlaced branches and a reduced number of leaves. This trait is more or less unique to New Zealand, with very few divaricate species being found elsewhere in the world. M. complexa is a vascular native of New Zealand, belonging to the Polygonaceae family. M. complexa forms a dense thick mass of interlaced branches. The stems are slender and creep or twine over other plants or rocks, without support it will climb upon itself. Forming thick and dense prostrate masses. When it occurs near the shore, frequently assumes cushion form. The stems are tough and woody, with numerous branches tightly interlaced, bark is red-brown in colour and have a wiry appearance. The leaves are petiolate, variable in shape and size, even on the same plant. Leaves may have lobed or entire margins. The leaves are rather sparse on slender stalks, up to 1 cm long, the leaf blade ranges from 5mm to 20 cm long by 2 to 15mm long. The flowers are delightfully scented and are supported on spikes approximately 2 cm long, that emerge from the leaf axils and the tips of branchlets. The flowers are small, dioecious and contain 8 stamens. As the flowers age, they enlarge into succulent fruits that are semi transparent with a shiny, black, triangular shaped seeds located in the centre of the fruits. It is semi-deciduous, losing most, or all of its leaves over winter.

=== Other names ===
Other names include tororaro (Māori), mattress plant, wiggy-bush, and wire vine. Commonly known as maidenhair vine, creeping wire vine, lacy wire vine, angel vine, mattress vine, mattress wire weed, necklace vine, and wire vine, Muehlenbeckia complexa is an ornamental plant in the family Polygonaceae, which is native to New Zealand. It got its genus name after botanist Muehlenbeck, and earned its species name due to its tangled growth habit.

== Distribution and habitat ==
It can be found growing throughout all three main islands of New Zealand (as well as Lord Howe Island in Australia), where it grows in a variety of habitats, occurring in coastal, lowland and montane regions. M. complexa is often found growing in company of Plagianthus divaricatus, shore ribbonwood.

Common throughout both Eastern and Western coasts of the United States including Hawaii, and native to New Zealand. This plant has also been introduced in Western Australia, Mexico, the United Kingdom, Malaysia, Japan, and parts of South America.

Preferred climates are coastal regions.

== Ecology ==
In its native environment it plays a key role sealing human and natural disturbances on the forest edge. It also suppresses the growth of introduced weeds, such as blackberry, and promotes increased insect diversity.

=== Ecological value for wildlife ===
A wide variety of insect species are associated with M. complexa. It is an important host plant for several endemic species of copper butterflies including the coastal copper (Lycaena salustius) and Maui's copper (Lycaena edna). M. complexa also hosts Aphis cotteri, an aphid native to New Zealand, the pohuehue gall moth (Morova subfasciata) and an endemic mite known as the pohuehue pocket gall mite (Eriophyes lambi). It is also a food source for birds such as tūī, bellbird and kererū, which also feed on the buds and leaves.

=== Predators, parasites, and diseases ===
Possums will readily eat Muehlenbeckia species.

=== Other information ===
Since 1995 or earlier, it has been a problematic invasive species in the Golden Gate National Recreation Area including Lands End, San Francisco and the Presidio of San Francisco and eradication requires 3–5 years monitoring and maintenance. Uncontrolled maidenhair vines can overrun gardens, climb trees and choke other plants.

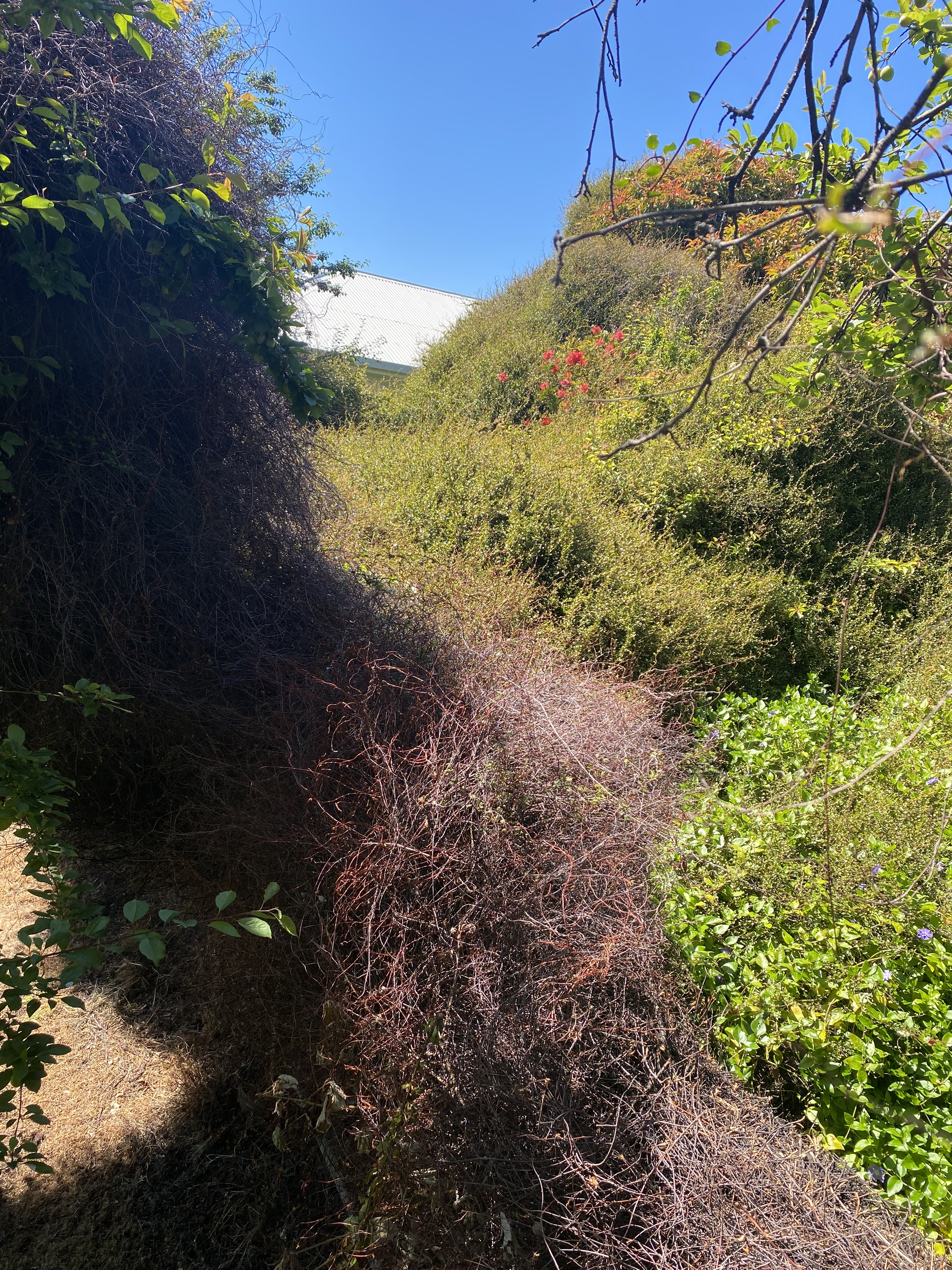
Uncontrolled maidenhair vine

== Cultural uses ==
The succulent flowers were eaten by Māori, especially children as they are sweet and juicy.
