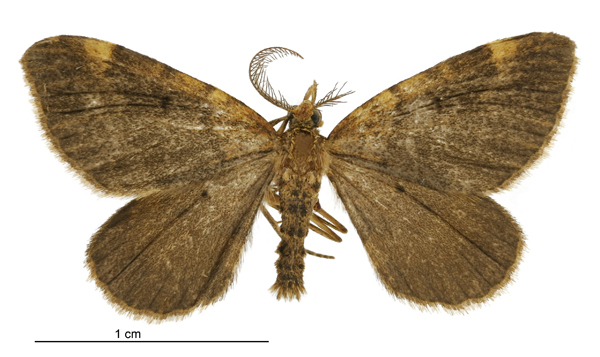
- Male
- Relict (NZ TCS)

Scientific classification
- Kingdom: Animalia
- Phylum: Arthropoda
- Clade: Pancrustacea
- Class: Insecta
- Order: Lepidoptera
- Family: Geometridae
- Genus: Asaphodes
- Species: A. chlorocapna

Binomial name
- Asaphodes chlorocapna (Meyrick, 1925)

Synonyms
- Xanthorhoe chlorocapna Meyrick, 1925

= Asaphodes chlorocapna =

Species of moth

Asaphodes chlorocapna is a species of moth in the family Geometridae. This species is endemic to New Zealand and can only be found in the Chatham Islands. The larvae of this species consume the leaves of Muehlenbeckia plants. Adults are on the wing in January. This species is classified as "At Risk, Relict'" by the Department of Conservation.

== Taxonomy ==
This species was first described by Edward Meyrick in 1925 as Xanthorhoe chlorocapna using a specimen collected by Stewart Lindsay at Mangere Island, in the Chatham Islands. George Hudson discussed and illustrated the species in 1928 using the name Xanthorhoe chlorocapna. In 1987 R. C. Craw placed this species within the genus Asaphodes. The holotype specimen is held at the Canterbury Museum.

== Description ==
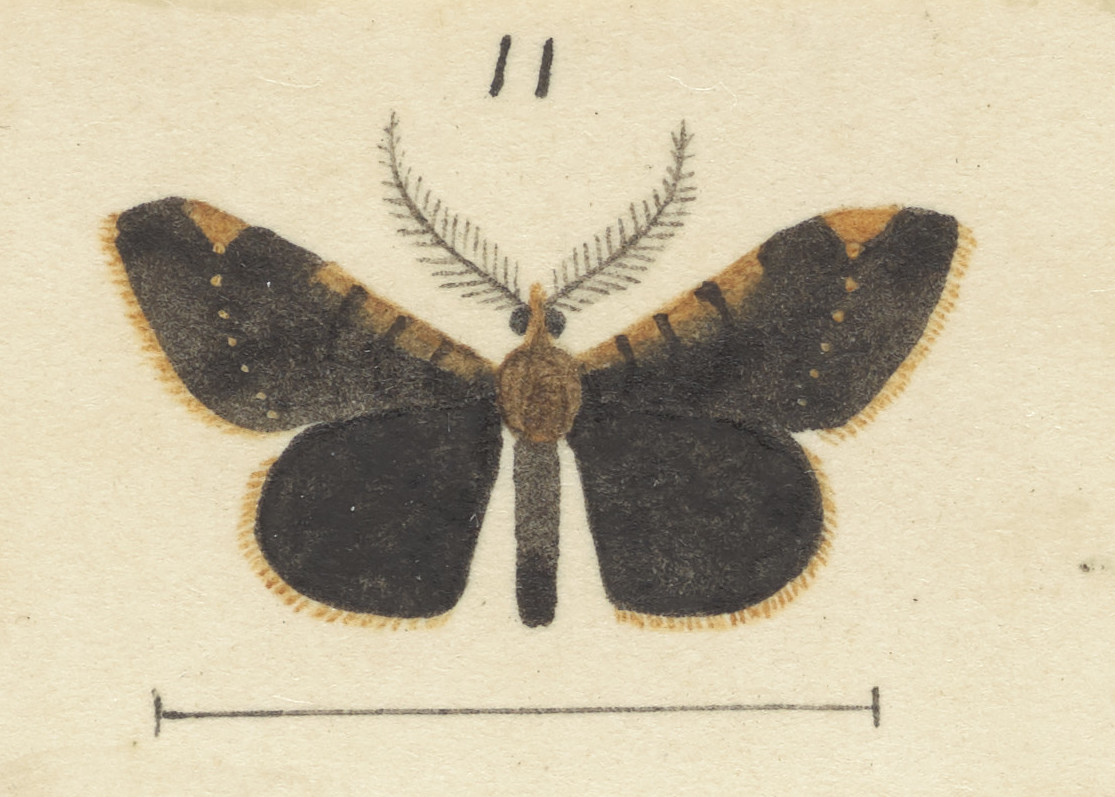
Illustration of male A. chlorocapna by George Hudson.

Meyrick described the species as follows:

♂︎ 24-26 mm. Head, palpi, thorax pale greyish-ochreous irrorated blackish. Antennal pectinations ten; forewings with termen slightly bowed, rather oblique; light smoky-grey suffusedly irrorated dark fuscous; costal area from base to 4/5 rather broadly suffused pale greyish-ochreous, with groups of two antemedian, and three postmedian dark fuscous shades crossing it, but becoming obsolete downwards; discal spot small, transverse, dark fuscous; cilia whitish, basal half dark grey. Hind wings dark grey; cilia whitish, basal third grey.

== Distribution ==
This species is endemic to New Zealand. It can only be found in the Chatham Islands where it can be found on Mangere Island, Pitt Island and Rangatira Island.

== Biology and life cycle ==
Adult moths are on the wing in January.

== Host plants and habitat ==
The larvae of this moth consume the fallen leaves of Muehlenbeckia species.

== Conservation status ==
This moth is classified under the New Zealand Threat Classification system as being "At Risk, Relict".
