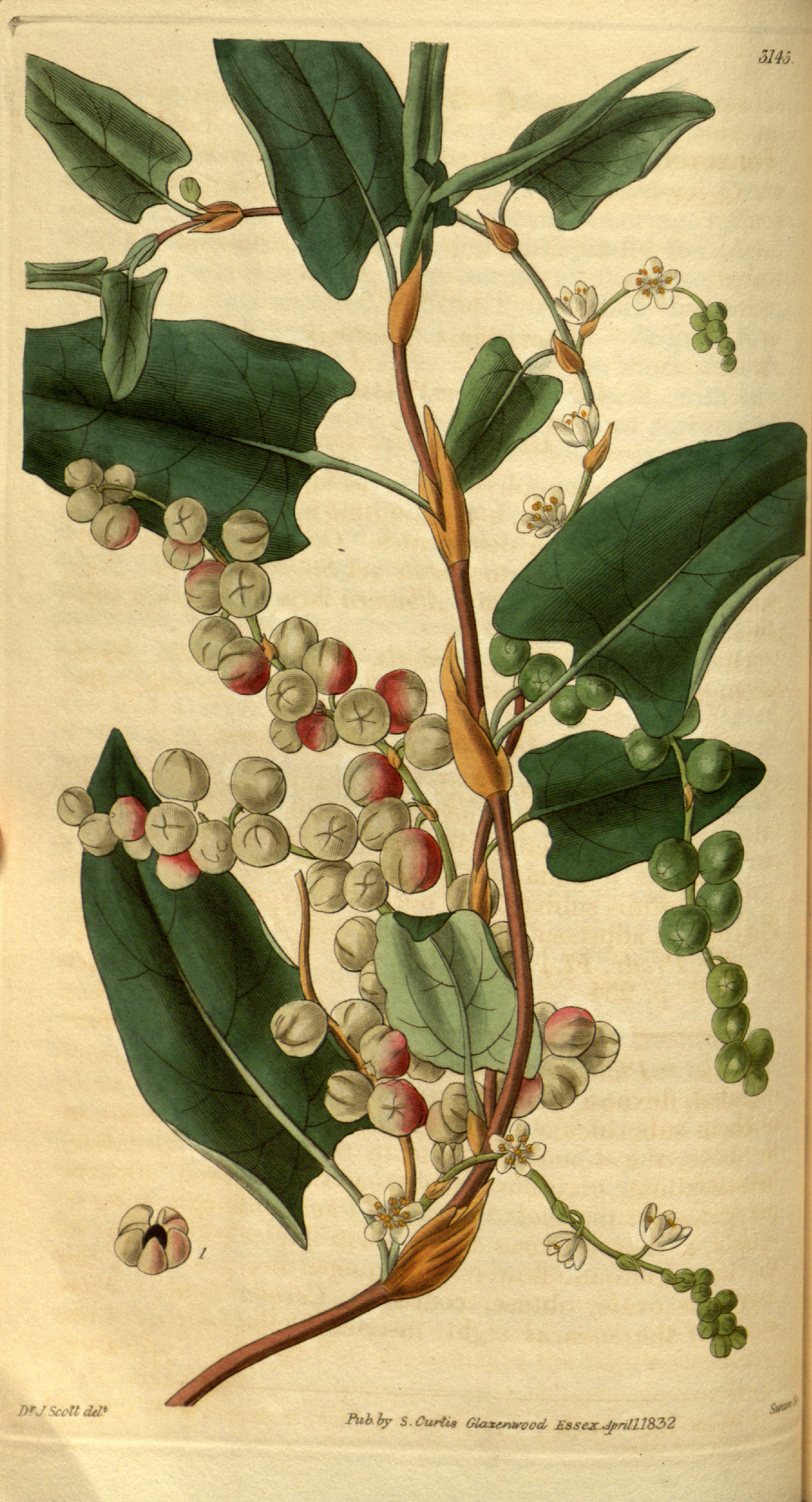
- M. adpressa (as Polygonum adpressum Plate 3145, Curtis's Botanical Magazine)

Scientific classification
- Kingdom: Plantae
- Clade: Tracheophytes
- Clade: Angiosperms
- Clade: Eudicots
- Order: Caryophyllales
- Family: Polygonaceae
- Genus: Muehlenbeckia
- Species: M. adpressa

Binomial name
- Muehlenbeckia adpressa (Labill.) Meisn.

Synonyms
- List: Polygonum adpressum Labill.; Calacinum adpressum (Labill.) Raf.; Coccoloba appressa Meisn. ex Steud.; Muehlenbeckia adpressa var. flexuosa (Meisn.) Benth.; Muehlenbeckia adpressa var. rotundifolia Benth.; Muehlenbeckia flexuosa Meisn.; Polygonum appressum (Meisn. ex Steud.) Steud.; Polygonum flexuosum (Meisn.) Kuntze; Sarcogonum adpressum (Labill.) G.Don; Sarcogonum depressum G.Don ex Loudon

= Muehlenbeckia adpressa =

Species of plant

Muehlenbeckia adpressa, commonly known as climbing lignum, is a prostrate or climbing plant, native to Australia. It has thin red-brown stems up to 1 metre (3 ft 3 in) in length. The leaves are 1.5–6 centimetres (0.59–2.36 in) long and 1.5–3.5 centimetres (0.59–1.38 in) wide. It occurs in coastal areas of Western Australia, South Australia, Tasmania, Victoria and New South Wales.

== Taxonomy ==
The species was first described in 1805 by Jacques Labillardière, as Polygonum adpressum. It was transferred to the genus Muehlenbeckia in 1843 by Carl Meissner. Some sources, including Plants of the World Online, regard M. adpressa as a synonym of M. australis. Others treat them as separate species.

== Gallery ==
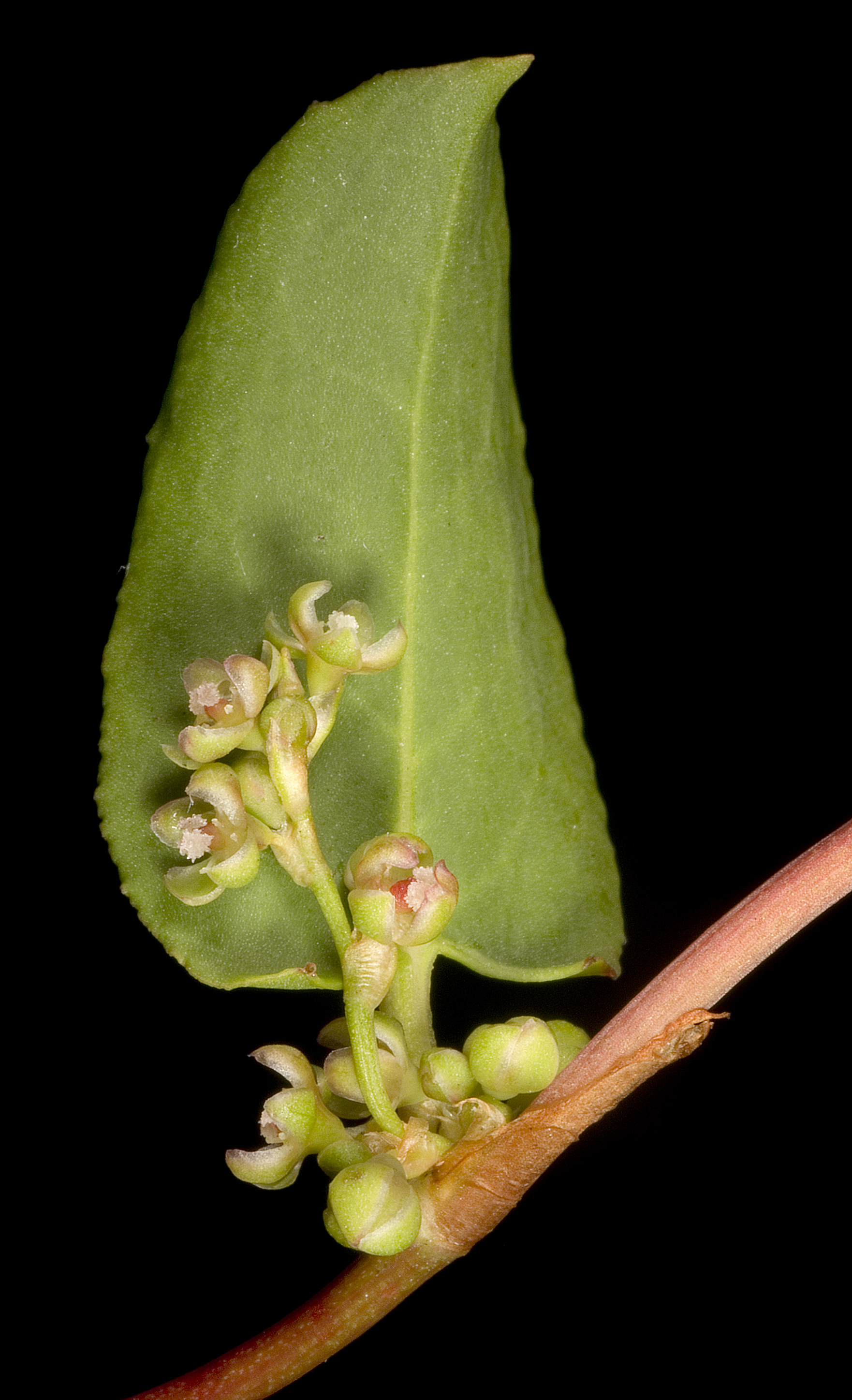

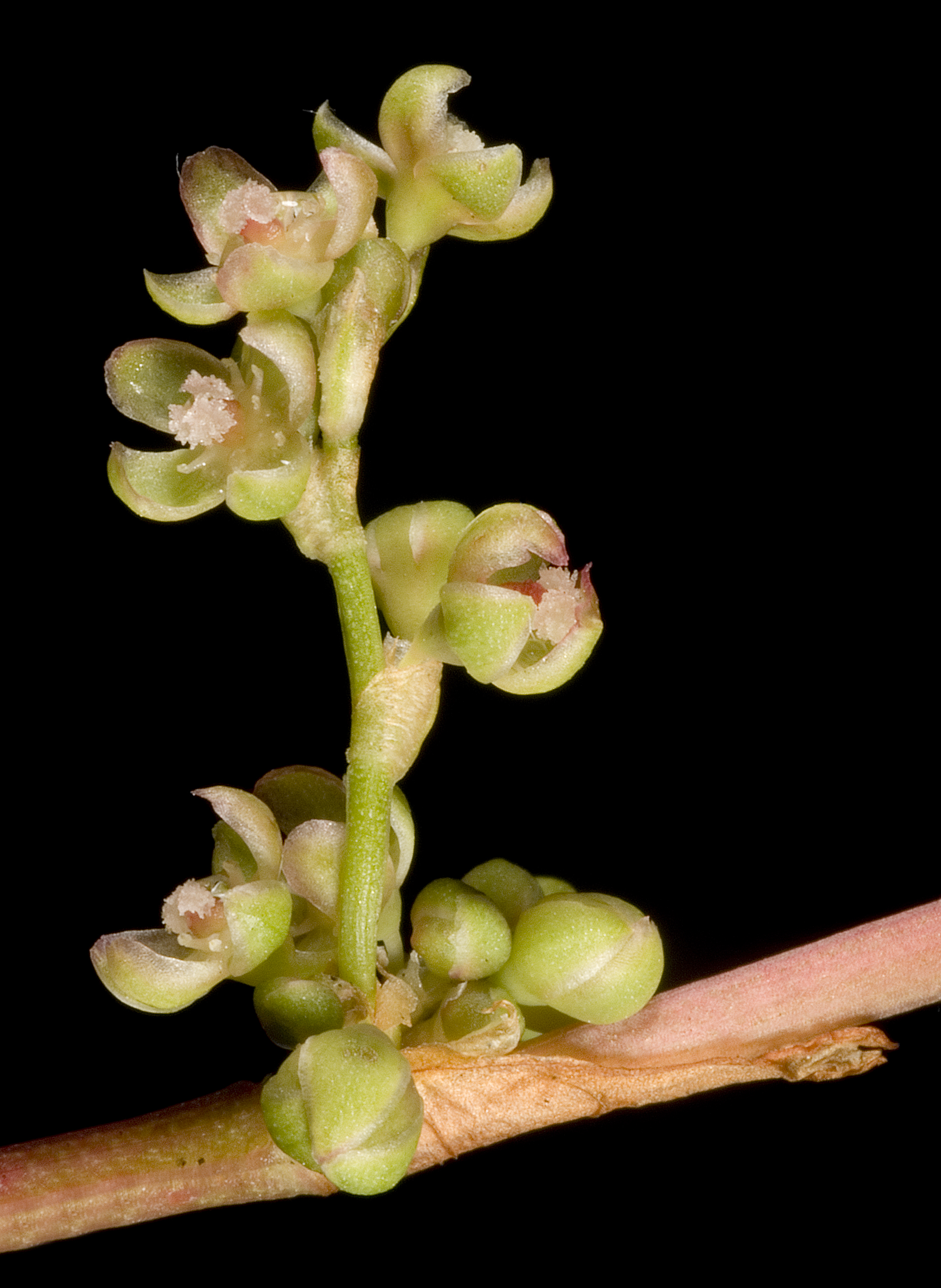

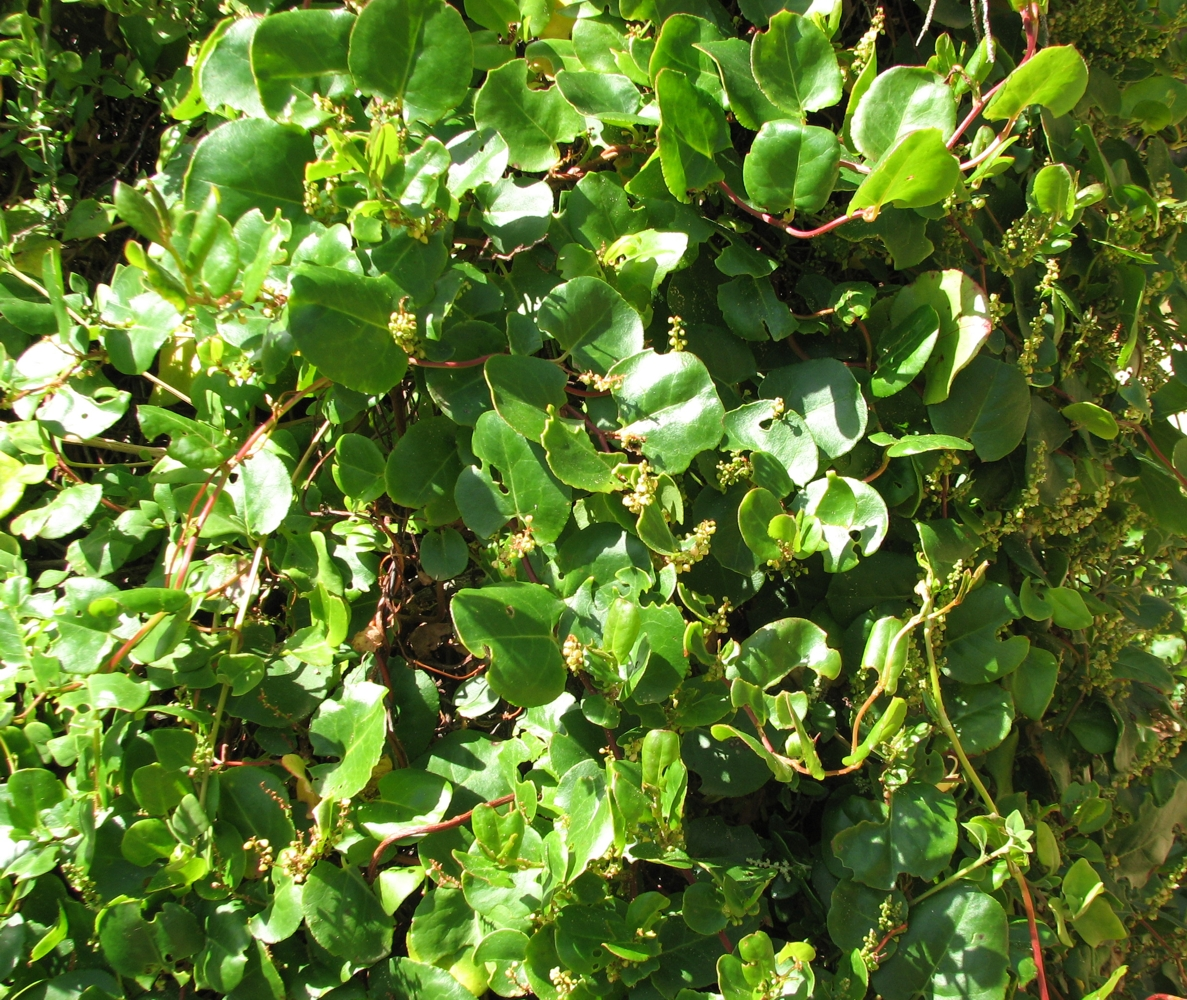
At Loch Ard Gorge, Victoria
