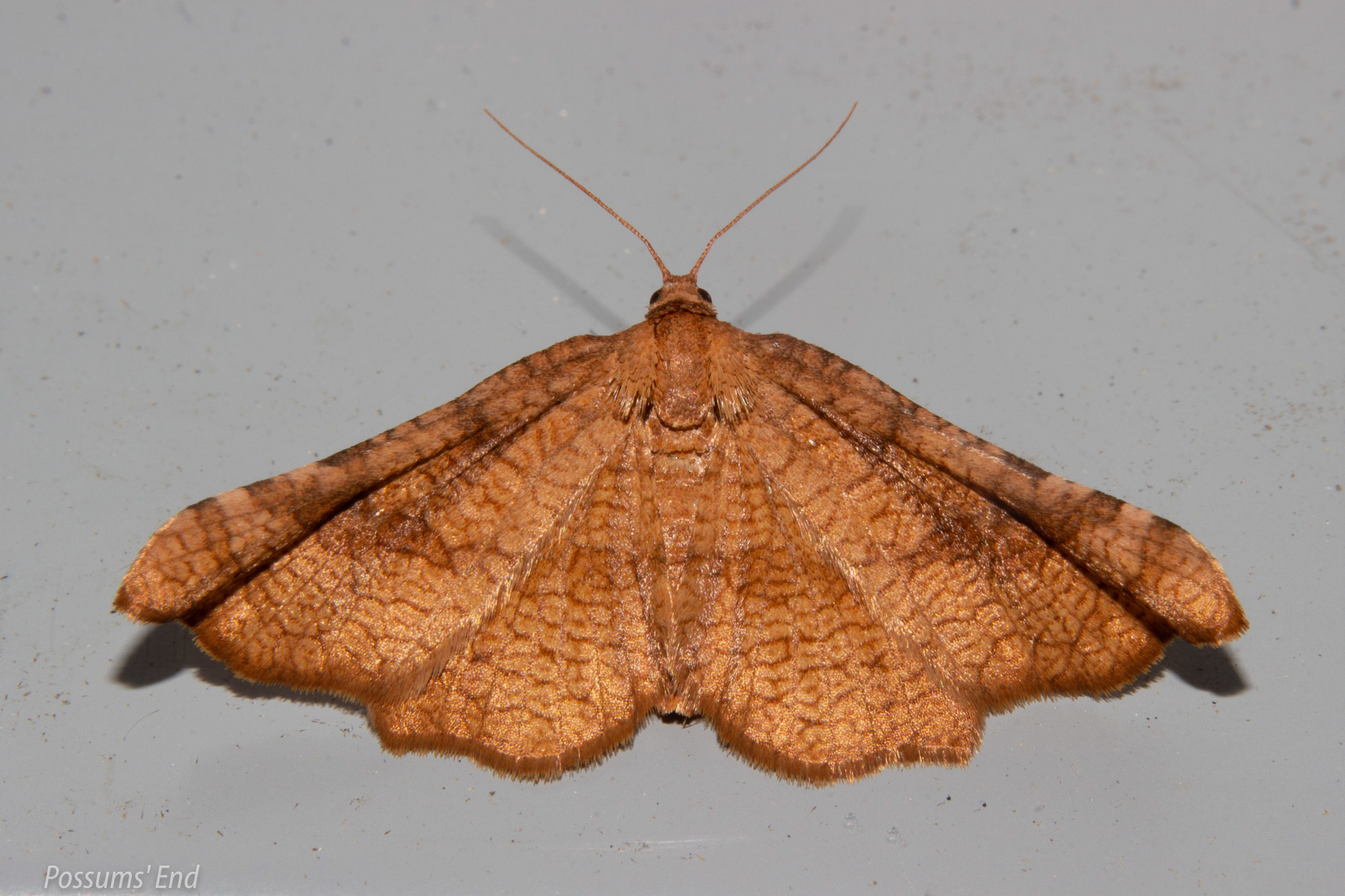

Scientific classification
- Kingdom: Animalia
- Phylum: Arthropoda
- Clade: Pancrustacea
- Class: Insecta
- Order: Lepidoptera
- Family: Thyrididae
- Genus: Morova
- Species: M. subfasciata

Binomial name
- Morova subfasciata Walker, 1865

Synonyms
- Cacoecia gallicolens Butler, 1874; Sinculodes subfasciata (Walker, 1865)

= Morova subfasciata =

Species of moth endemic to New Zealand

Morova subfasciata, also known as the Muehlenbeckia stem gall moth, is a species of moth in the family Thyrididae. It was first described by Francis Walker in 1865. This species is endemic to New Zealand and can be found throughout the country. This moth frequents native forest, scrubland and coastal habitat where its larval host plants are present. Larvae feed on species in the genera Muehlenbeckia and Parsonsia. The female moth lays eggs on larval host plant and then the larvae bore into, feed within and inhabit the resulting swellings in the stems of that plant. When mature the larvae pupate within the chamber caused by their feeding.

The adult moth is most commonly observed on the wing from November to March. The adults vary considerably in size with smaller males having a wingspan of 8 mm to larger females having a wingspan of 17 mm. Both sexes also vary considerably in the depth of the ground colour and intensity of the markings but the male is always much smaller and darker than the female. The colouration and shape of the wings of the adults mimic dead leaves. Both sexes are nocturnal and are attracted to light but males have been observed flying during hot sunshine.

== Taxonomy ==
This species was first described by Francis Walker in 1865 using specimens collected in Nelson by Thomas R. Oxley. In 1874 Arthur Gardiner Butler, thinking he was describing a new species, named this moth Cacoecia gallicolens. In 1883 and again in greater detail in 1884 Edward Meyrick placed this species in the genus Sinculodes and synonymised C. gallicolens. In 1913 Meyrick placed this species back in the genus Morova. George Hudson discussed and illustrated this species under the name Morova subfasciata in his 1928 book The butterflies and moths of New Zealand. In 1929 Alfred Philpott examined the male genitalia of this species. In 1988 John S. Dugdale confirmed the placement of that species in the genus Morova. The female holotype is held at the Natural History Museum, London.

== Description ==
Larva and gall.

Hudson described the adults of this species as follows:

The expansion of the wings of the male is 7/8 inch, of the female 1 3/8 inches. The costa is strongly arched before the apex and the termen of both wings strongly bowed outwards near the middle. The male has all the wings and body dark reddish-brown with an obscure darker brown central band across the middle of both wings; there are numerous scattered fine, dark brown wavy marks, and a short curved band from the costa before the apex, which does not reach the dorsum. The female has the ground colour very bright ochreous-brown, with the markings similar to the male, but much more conspicuous owing to the paler ground colour.

The adults vary considerably in size with smaller males having a wingspan of 8 mm to larger females having a wingspan of 17 mm. Both sexes also vary considerably in the depth of the ground colour and intensity of the markings but the male is always much smaller and darker than the female.

The pupa is somewhat elongate, is dark brown and shiny, and has a conical sharp-pointed protuberance on the top of the head case.

Hudson described the larva of this species as follows:

The full-grown larva is rather stout with the segments deeply excised. The head is small, dark brown and shining; the second segment has a large, dark brown, horny dorsal plate; the rest of the larva is pinkish-ochreous; the twelfth and thirteenth segments are partially horny on the back; there is an obscure dorsal line; segments three to eleven inclusive are furnished with several very indistinct warts; the legs are small and horny and the prolegs minute.

The eggs are a flat, circular, fringed disc shape and said to be coloured either orange or white.

=== Gallery showing variation in adults ===
Female above, male below.

== Distribution ==
This species is endemic to New Zealand and can be found throughout the country.

== Habitat and hosts ==
This moth frequents native forest, scrubland and coastal habitat where its larval host plants are present. The larval host plants of this species include species in the genus Muehlenbeckia, including Muehlenbeckia australis, and the genus Parsonsia.

== Life cycle ==
The female moth lays eggs on larval host plant and then the larvae bore into, feed on the pith within and inhabit the resulting swellings in the stems of that plant. When mature the larvae pupate within the chamber caused by their feeding, ensuring that, prior to pupation, a safe passage has been created to enable to adult moth to escape from the gall. The end of this passage is blocked externally by a thin closure of bark as well as internally by a curtain of silk placed at the passage entrance. The projection at the top of the head case of the pupa is likely used to assist it in forcing its way through the silk and bark closure protecting the escape passage when the moth is ready to emerge.

== Behaviour ==
The adult moth is most commonly observed on the wing from November to March. Both sexes are nocturnal and are attracted to light but males have been observed flying during hot sunshine. The colouration and shape of the wings of the adults of this species mimic dead leaves.

== Parasitoids ==
The larvae play host to the parasitoid wasp Diadegma muelleri.
