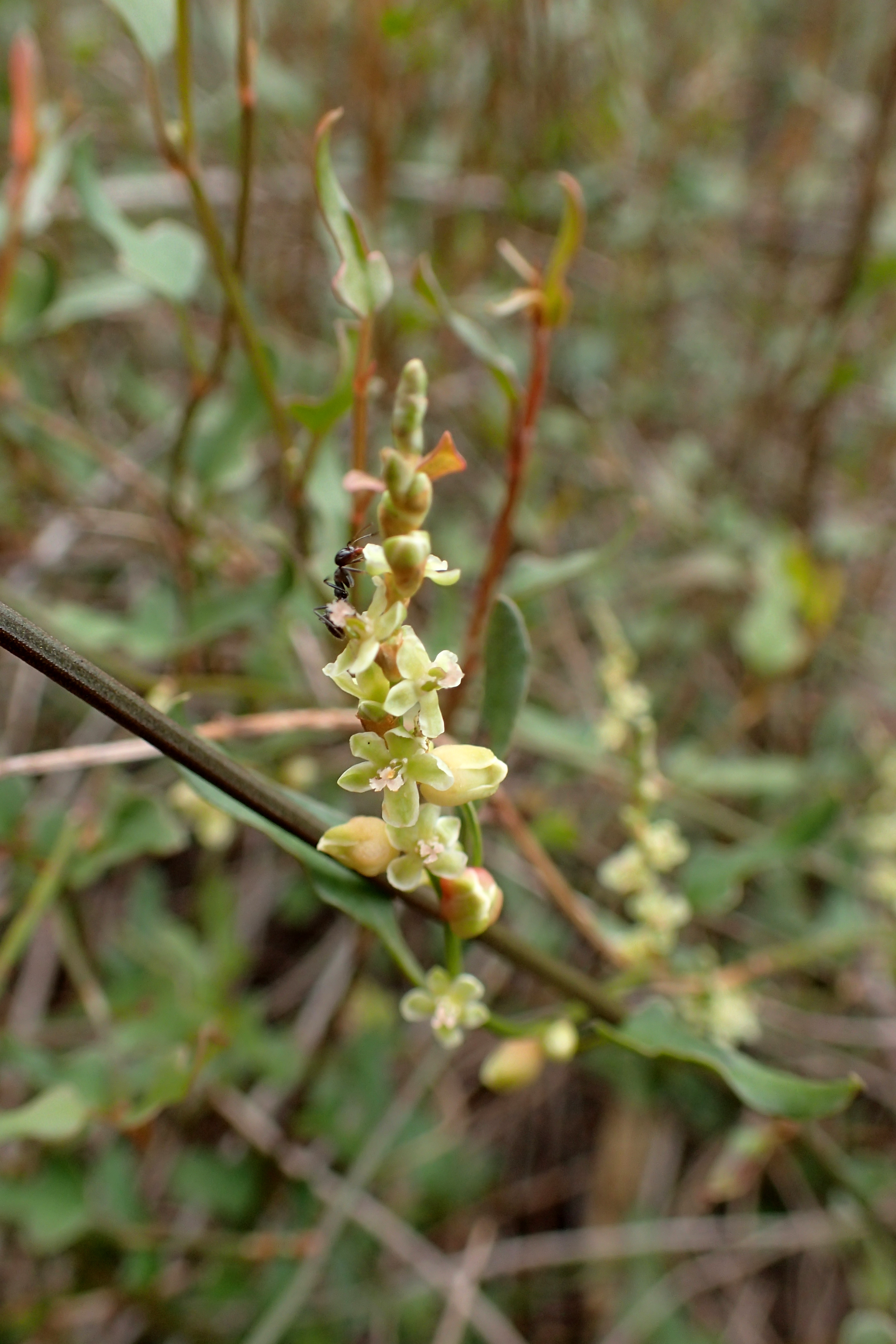

Scientific classification
- Kingdom: Plantae
- Clade: Tracheophytes
- Clade: Angiosperms
- Clade: Eudicots
- Order: Caryophyllales
- Family: Polygonaceae
- Genus: Muehlenbeckia
- Species: M. ephedroides

Binomial name
- Muehlenbeckia ephedroides (Hook f.)

= Muehlenbeckia ephedroides =

Species of flowering plant

Muehlenbeckia ephedroides, the leafless pohuehue or leafless muehlenbeckia, is a prostrate or climbing plant native to New Zealand.

== Description ==
Muehlenbeckia ephedroides are grey-green, grey to grey-black in colour. The stem is branched and is 1 millimetre (0.039 in) in diameter. It is also flexuous, striate, puberulent, and is grey to grey-black or grey-green in colour. The leaves are of the same colour, are glabrous and are 5–25 millimetres (0.20–0.98 in) long. Inflorescence is fascicled or racimed with pale pedicels that are 1–1.5 millimetres (0.039–0.059 in) long. Flowers have a pistillate and are staminate as well. Lobes are narrow-triangular, and are either white, pale yellow-green or just green in colour. Stigmas are obovoid trigonous and are 1.5 millimetres (0.059 in) long. They have white coloured and succulent tepals that are swollen also. The twigs are leafless.

== Habitat ==
It grows at elevations of 0–1,200 metres (0–3,937 ft) in coastal or subalpine climates. It can be found growing near rivers, on beaches, sand spits, and alluvial fans.
