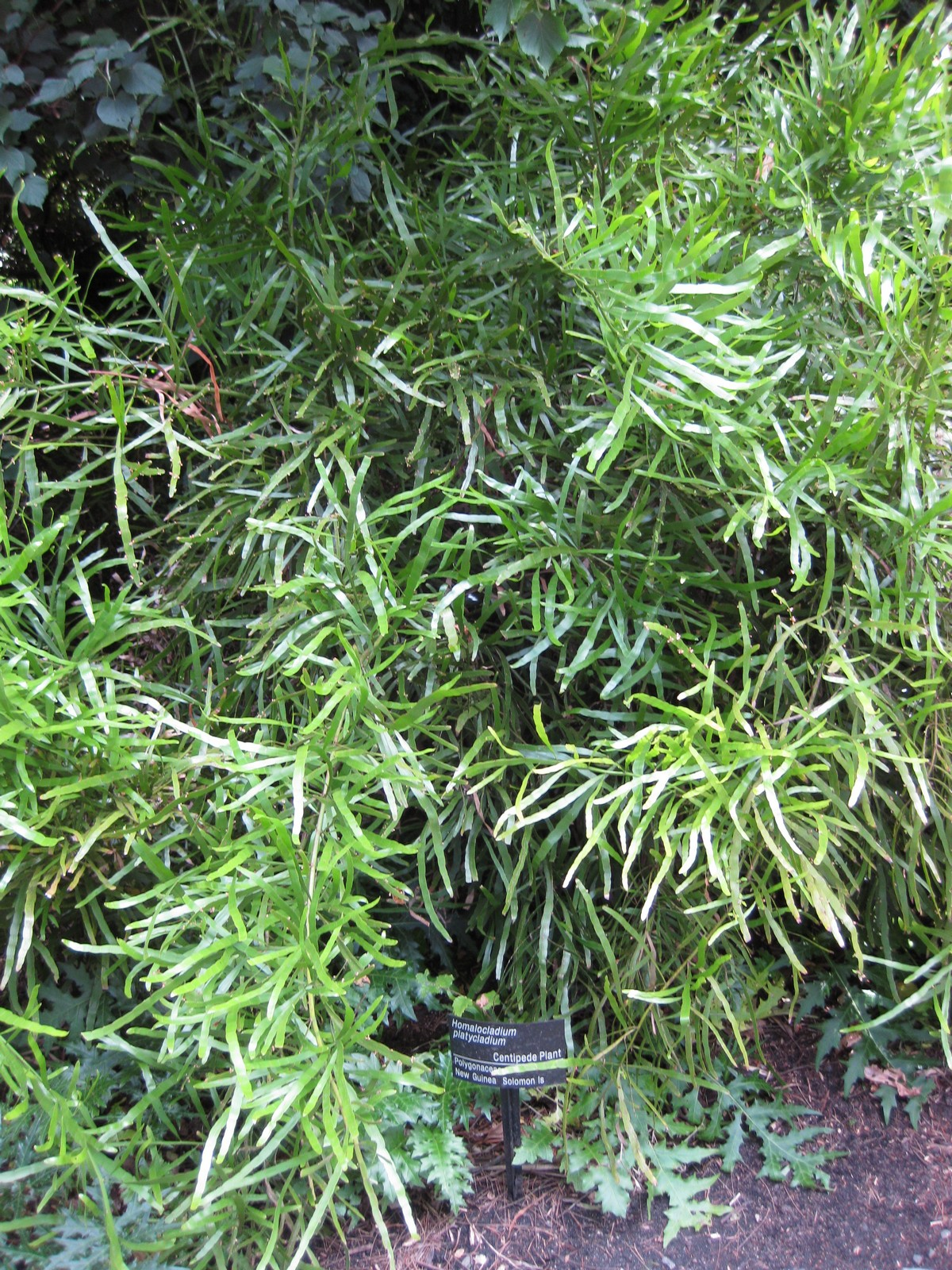

Scientific classification
- Kingdom: Plantae
- Clade: Tracheophytes
- Clade: Angiosperms
- Clade: Eudicots
- Order: Caryophyllales
- Family: Polygonaceae
- Genus: Muehlenbeckia
- Species: M. platyclada

Binomial name
- Muehlenbeckia platyclada (F. Muell.) Meisn.

Synonyms
- Calacinum platycladum (F.Muell.) J.F.Macbr.; Coccoloba platyclada F.Muell. ex Hook.; Homalocladium platycladum (F.Muell.) L.H.Bailey; Polygonum platycladum F.Muell.; Sarcogonum platycladum (F.Muell.) Voss

= Muehlenbeckia platyclada =

Species of flowering plant

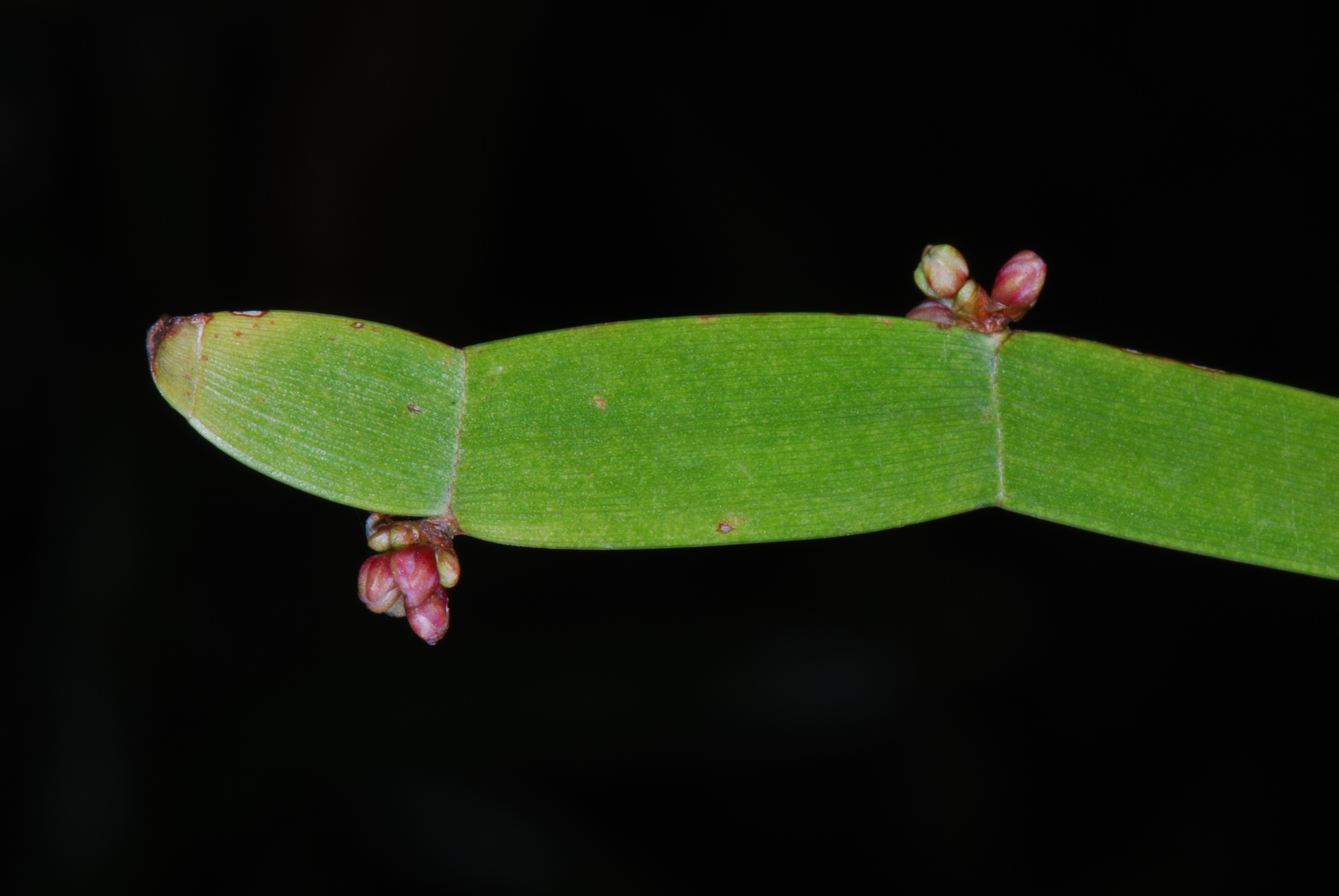

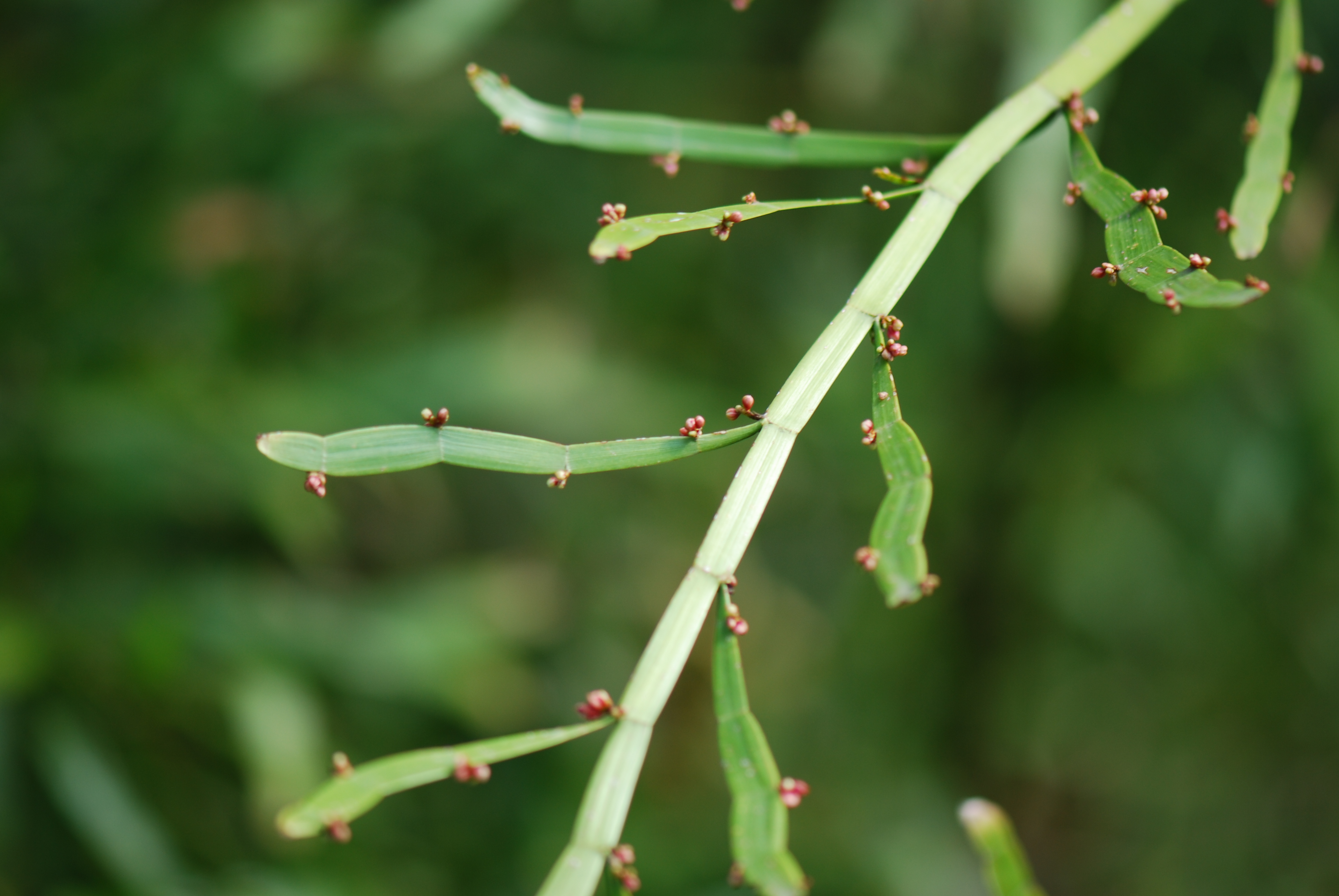

Muehlenbeckia platyclada (synonym Homalocladium platycladum), known as centipede plant, tapeworm plant or ribbonbush, is a species of plant in the knotweed family from New Guinea and the Solomon Islands. It is also naturalized in other tropical regions, including Puerto Rico, India, Bolivia, Madagascar, Nicaragua and Pakistan.

== Description ==
Evergreen shrub with flattened, jointed, green stems and arrow-shaped leaves. This shrub has both spreading and climbing tendencies. Flowers are short-lived and compact. Grows in well-drained soil that is moist in full sun. It also grows well in sandy loam to clayey soil with pH 5.5 to 6. Will tolerate some shade, heat and humidity. It grows 2 to 4 ft. high and 1.5 to 3 ft. wide. Leaves dark green, elongated, flattened, alternately arranged on a flat stem. Flowers tiny, white to light pink. Blooms from early to late spring.
