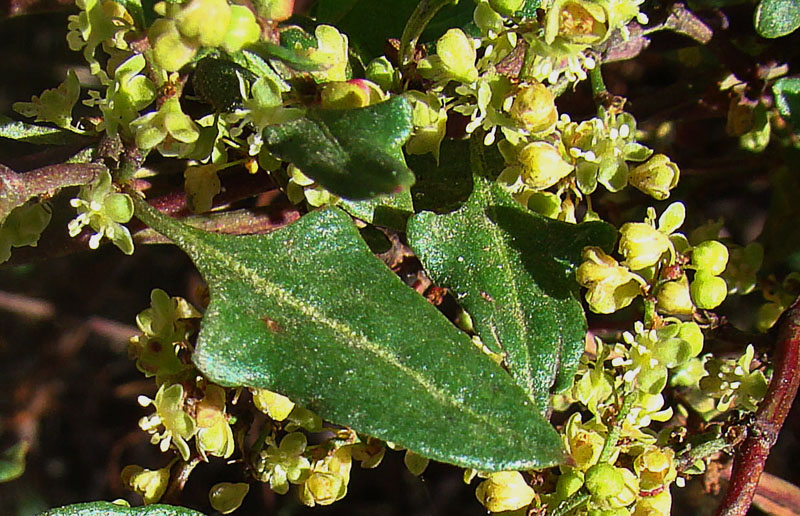

Scientific classification
- Kingdom: Plantae
- Clade: Tracheophytes
- Clade: Angiosperms
- Clade: Eudicots
- Order: Caryophyllales
- Family: Polygonaceae
- Genus: Muehlenbeckia
- Species: M. hastulata

Binomial name
- Muehlenbeckia hastulata (Sm.) I.M. Johnst.

= Muehlenbeckia hastulata =

Species of flowering plant

Muehlenbeckia hastulata is a species of flowering plant in the family Polygonaceae. It is native to South America. It is a rapidly growing climbing plant and is common in Chile.
