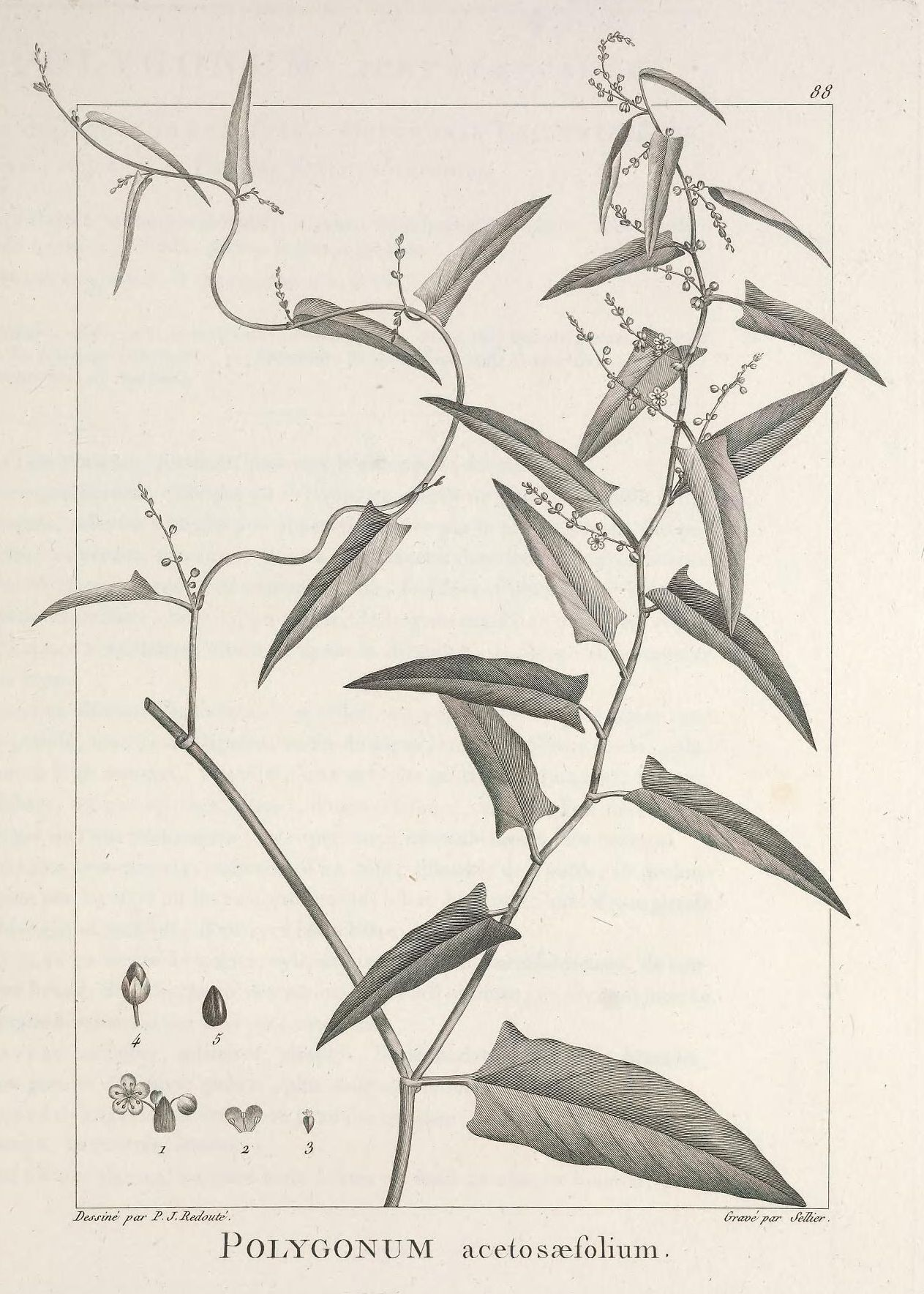

Scientific classification
- Kingdom: Plantae
- Clade: Tracheophytes
- Clade: Angiosperms
- Clade: Eudicots
- Order: Caryophyllales
- Family: Polygonaceae
- Genus: Muehlenbeckia
- Species: M. sagittifolia

Binomial name
- Muehlenbeckia sagittifolia (Ortega) Meisn.

= Muehlenbeckia sagittifolia =

Species of flowering plant

Muehlenbeckia sagittifolia is a species of flowering plant native to South America (in northern Argentina, Uruguay, Paraguay, Bolivia and southern Brazil). Outside of its range, it has been introduced in Portugal (including the Azores and Madeira archipelagos)
