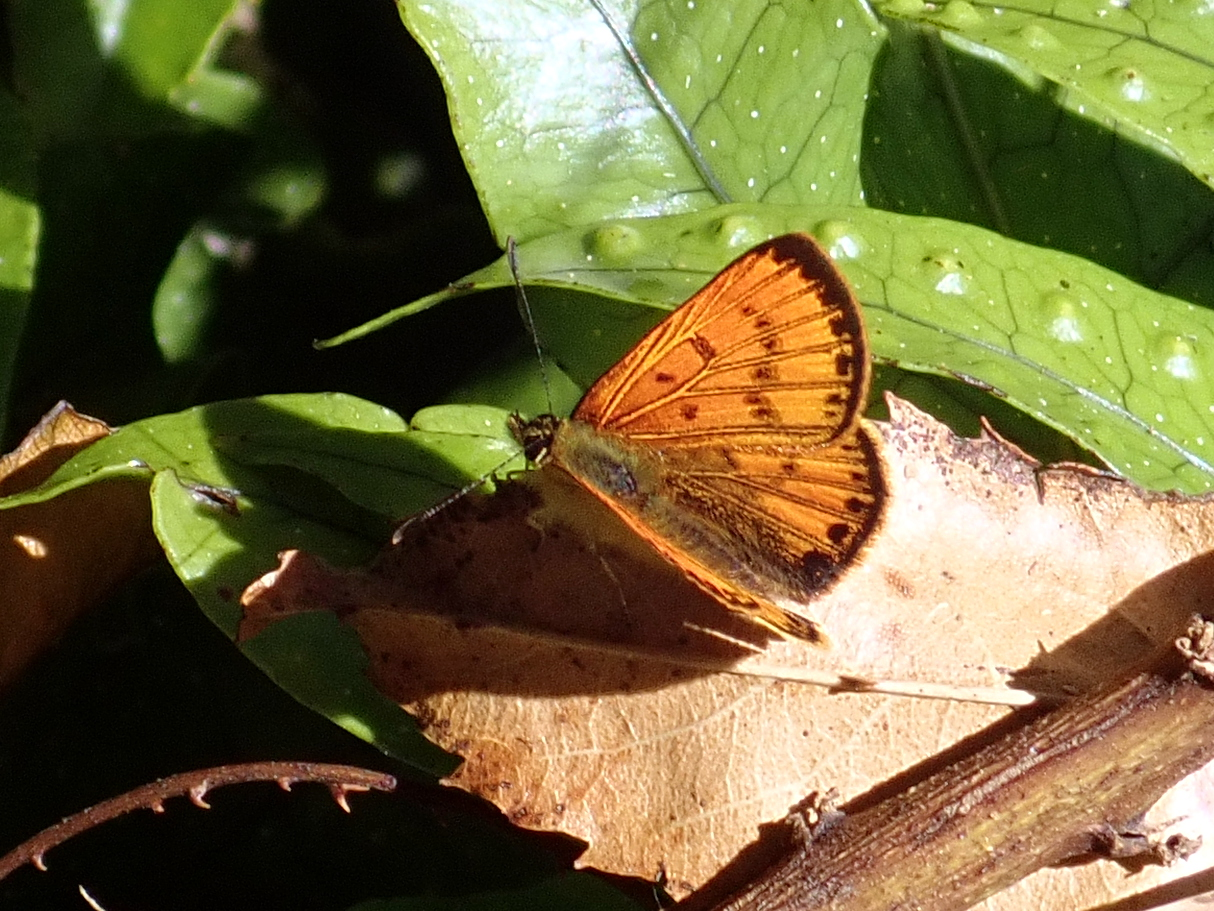
- A copper butterfly on a leaf.

Scientific classification
- Domain: Eukaryota
- Kingdom: Animalia
- Phylum: Arthropoda
- Class: Insecta
- Order: Lepidoptera
- Family: Lycaenidae
- Genus: Lycaena
- Species: L. edna

Binomial name
- Lycaena edna Doubleday, 1843

= Lycaena edna =

Species of butterfly

Lycaena edna, or Maui's copper, is a butterfly of the family Lycaenidae. It is endemic to New Zealand. It is known in the Māori language as pepe para riki, a name that is shared with a few other members of the genus Lycaena native to New Zealand, including the closely related coastal copper.

The larvae feed on Muehlenbeckia species.

== See also ==
- Butterflies of New Zealand
