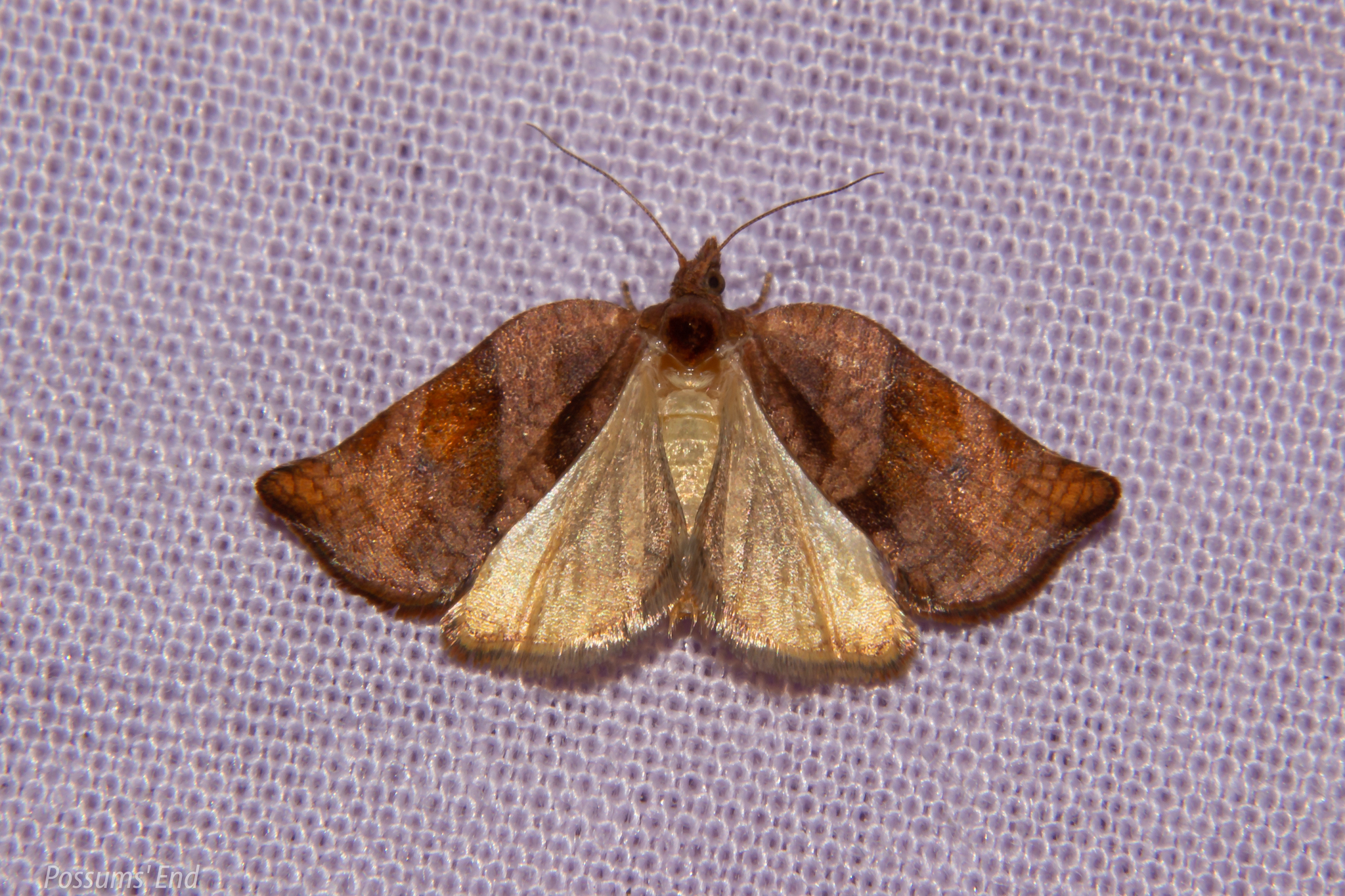
- Female
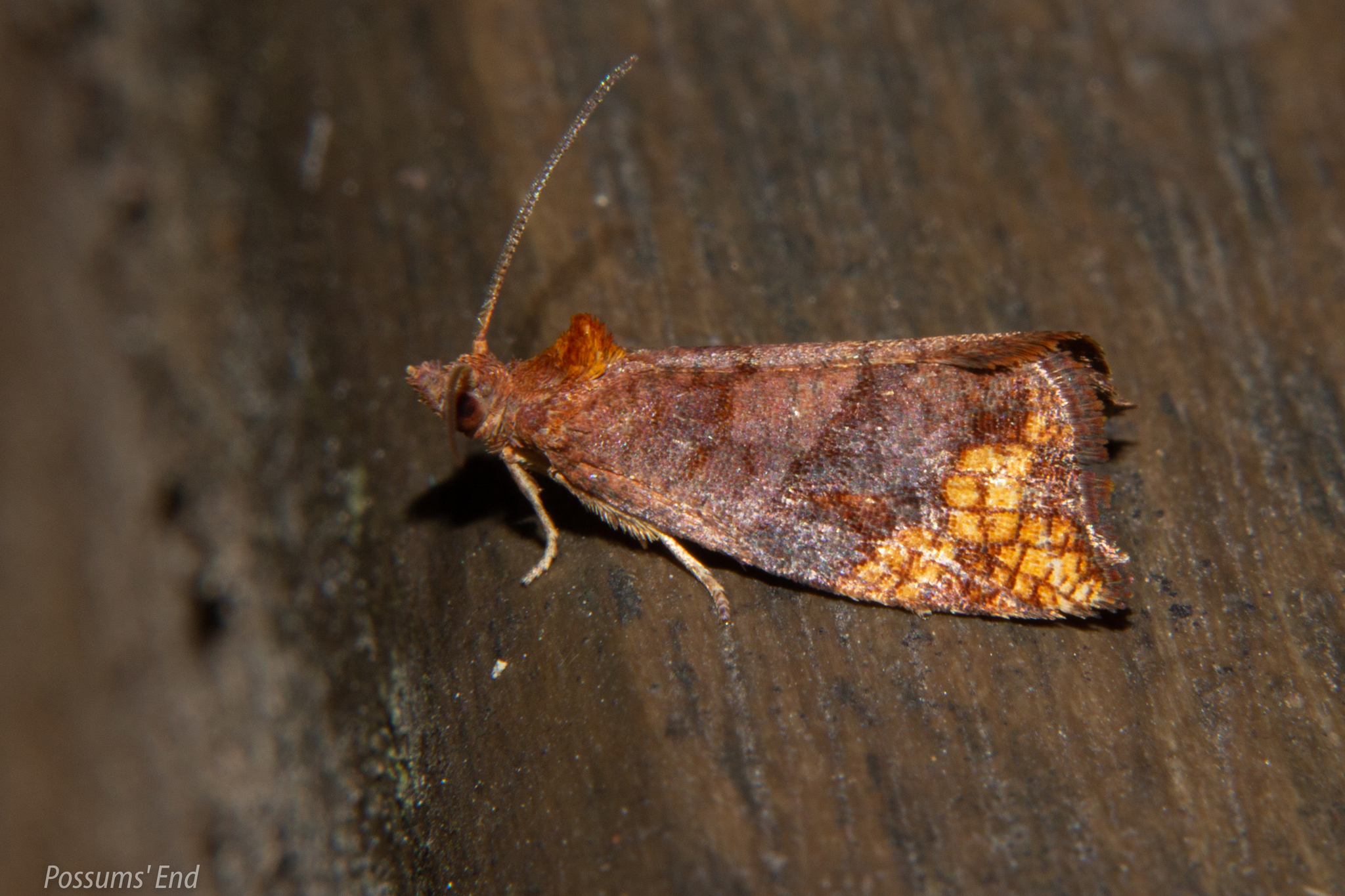
- Male

Scientific classification
- Kingdom: Animalia
- Phylum: Arthropoda
- Clade: Pancrustacea
- Class: Insecta
- Order: Lepidoptera
- Family: Tortricidae
- Genus: Pyrgotis
- Species: P. eudorana

Binomial name
- Pyrgotis eudorana Meyrick, 1885

= Pyrgotis eudorana =

Species of moth endemic to New Zealand

Pyrgotis eudorana is a species of moth of the family Tortricidae. It is endemic in New Zealand and has been observed in both the North and South Islands. However it is regarded as a rare insect. This species inhabits native forest. Larvae exclusively feed on Muehlenbeckia australis and adults are on the wing from November to April. Adults are attracted to light.

== Taxonomy ==
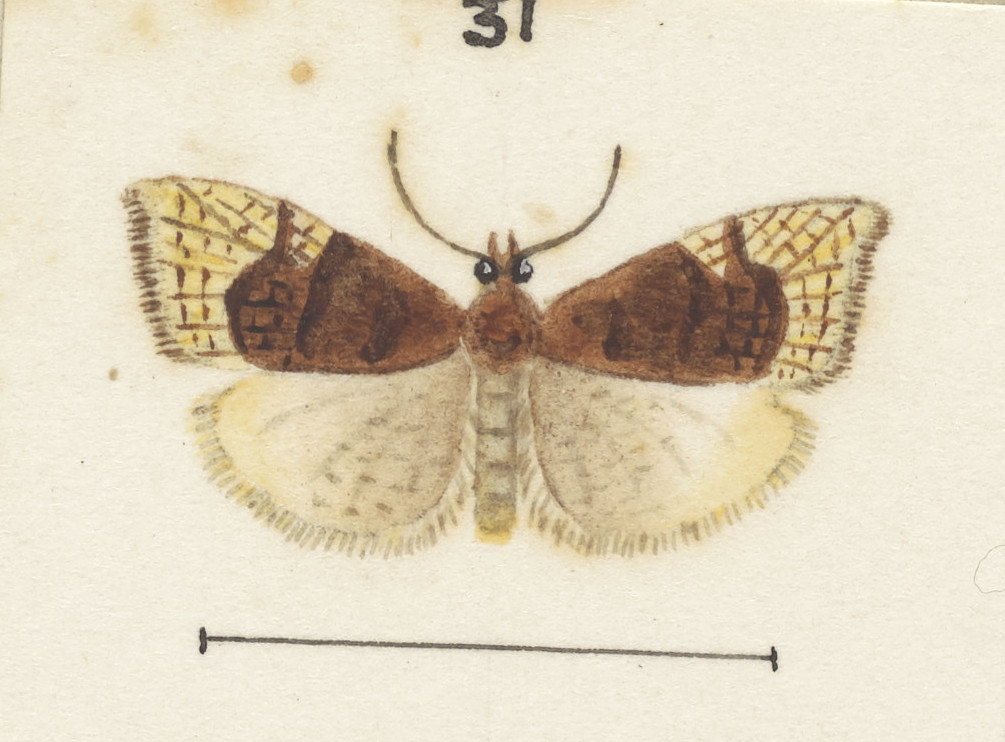
Illustration by George Hudson.

This species was first described by Edward Meyrick in 1885 using a female specimen collected at New Plymouth in February. Later that year Meyrick gave a more detailed description of the species. Meyrick, in 1911, described the male of the species. In 1928 George Hudson discussed and illustrated this species in his publication The butterflies and moths of New Zealand. In both 1971 and again in 1988 J. S. Dugdale confirmed the placement of this species within the genus Pyrgotis. The female holotype specimen is held at the Natural History Museum, London.

== Description ==
Meyrick described the adult female of this species as follows:

Female.—20 mm. Head, palpi, and thorax purplish-ochreous. Antennae ochreous-whitish. Abdomen and legs yellow-whitish, anterior and middle pair suffused with reddish-fuscous. Forewings broad, oblong, costa anteriorly very strongly arched, apex round-pointed, produced, hindmargin strongly sinuate, hardly oblique; purplish-ochreous, obscurely strigulated with greyish-purple; a slightly darker purplish basal patch, its outer edge extending from 1/5 of costa to 2/5 of inner margin, not angulated; central fascia straight, broad throughout, greyish purple, suffused with bright reddish-ochreous on upper half posteriorly, running from middle of costa to anal angle; a more distinct strigula from 3/4 of costa to hindmargin below middle: cilia rather dark fuscous purplish. Hindwings yellow-whitish, towards apex more yellowish, somewhat spotted with pale grey towards inner margin; cilia yellow-whitish. A handsome species, readily known by the different form of wing, straight outline of basal patch, and broad central fascia; the costa is very much more strongly arched anteriorly than in any other species.

In 1911 Meyrick described the adult male of the species as follows:

♂. 18mm. Head and thorax reddish-ochreous-fuscous, thoracic crest ferruginous-ochreous. Antennal ciliations 1. Abdomen whitish-grey, anal tuft ochreous-whitish. Forewings rather elongate-triangular, costa gently arched, with moderate costal fold reaching 2/5, apex obtuse, termen slightly sinuate, somewhat oblique; fuscous-purplish indistinctly strigulated with dark grey; costal fold brownish-ochreous strigulated with grey; a triangular apical ochreous-orange patch, marked with some dark-fuscous strigulae between veins and on costa, its anterior edge straight, running from 3/5 of costa to tornus; central fascia indicated as an evenly broad band of darker suffusion preceding this: cilia reddish-ochreous-fuscous. Hindwings pale grey, apical half ochreous-whitish; cilia ochreous-whitis, on lower half of termen basally spotted with light grey.

== Distribution ==
This species is endemic to New Zealand. It has been observed in both the North and South Islands at locations such as Taranaki, Lake Horowhenua, Kaitoki, Wellington, and Dunedin. It is regarded as being rare.

== Habitat ==
This species inhabits native forest.

== Behaviour ==
Adults of this species are on the wing in November to April with the species appearing to be most abundant in December. This species has been collected via a black light trap.

== Host species ==
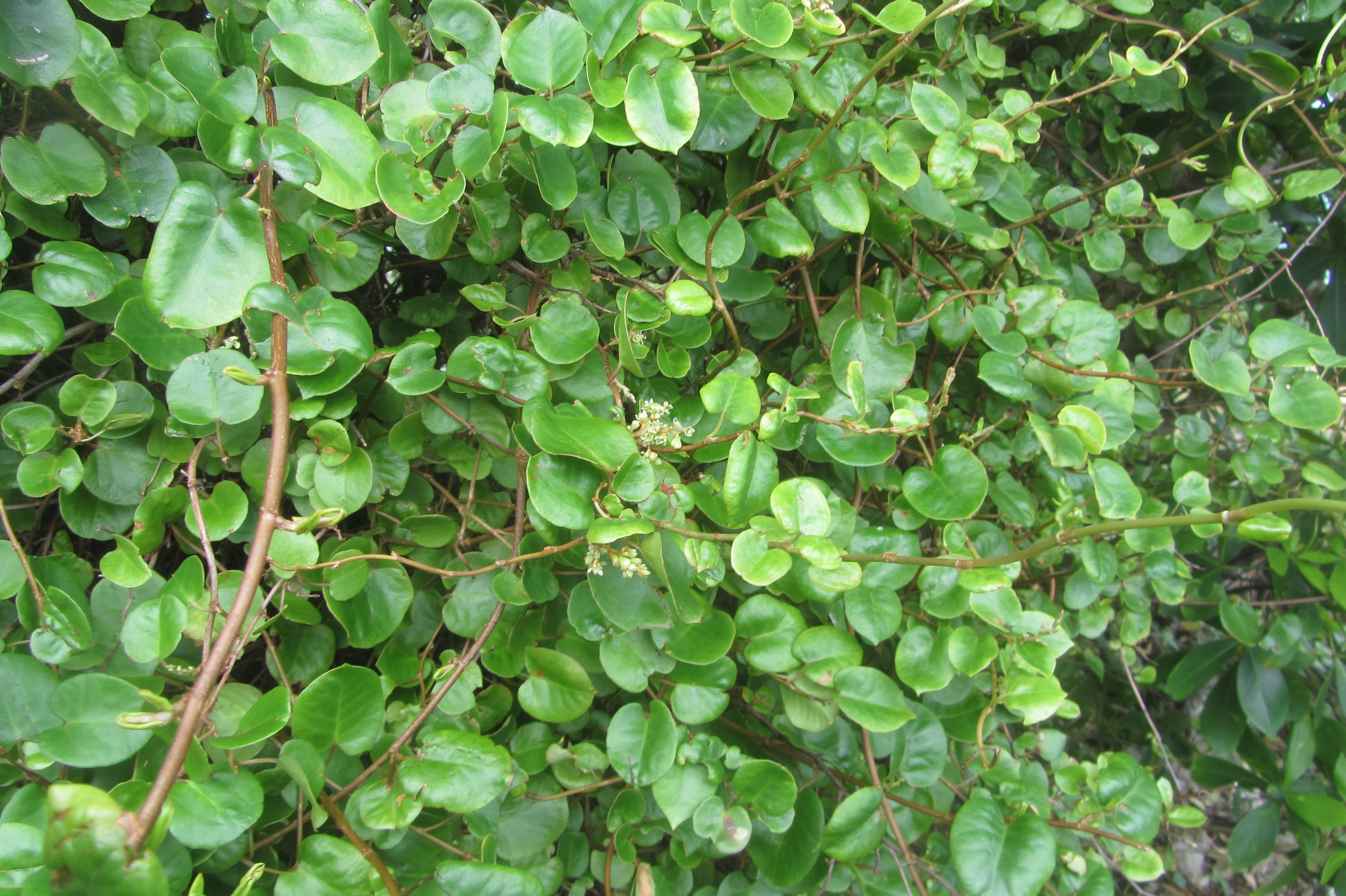
Larval host species Muehlenbeckia australis.

P. eudorana larvae feed exclusively on Muehlenbeckia australis.
