= Muehlenbeckia axillaris =

Scientific classification
- Kingdom: Plantae
- Clade: Tracheophytes
- Clade: Angiosperms
- Clade: Eudicots
- Order: Caryophyllales
- Family: Polygonaceae
- Genus: Muehlenbeckia
- Species: M. axillaris

Binomial name
- Muehlenbeckia axillaris (Hook.f.) Walp.

Synonyms
- Pseudanthus tasmanicus

Species of shrub

Muehlenbeckia axillaris, commonly known as creeping wire vine, sprawling wire vine, or matted lignum, is a low evergreen shrub, forming wiry mats up to about 1 metre (3 ft 3 in) in diameter, native to New Zealand, and the Australian states of Tasmania, New South Wales and Victoria. It has thin, red-brown stems, with glossy squarish to roundish leaves that are less than 1 cm (0.39 in) in diameter and 2–4 mm (0.079–0.157 in) thick. Flowers are inconspicuous, yellowish-white, 4–8 mm (0.16–0.31 in) in diameter, and borne in groups of up to three in the axils. The fruit is black, shiny, and up to 3.5 mm (0.14 in) long, produced in late summer to fall.

The plant is hardy, drought-tolerant, and quick-growing, thriving in a range of light conditions. It can be cultivated as a ground cover and grows well in rocky ground, as well as standard potting soil. Although it grows fastest in warm seasons, it tolerates freezing weather.

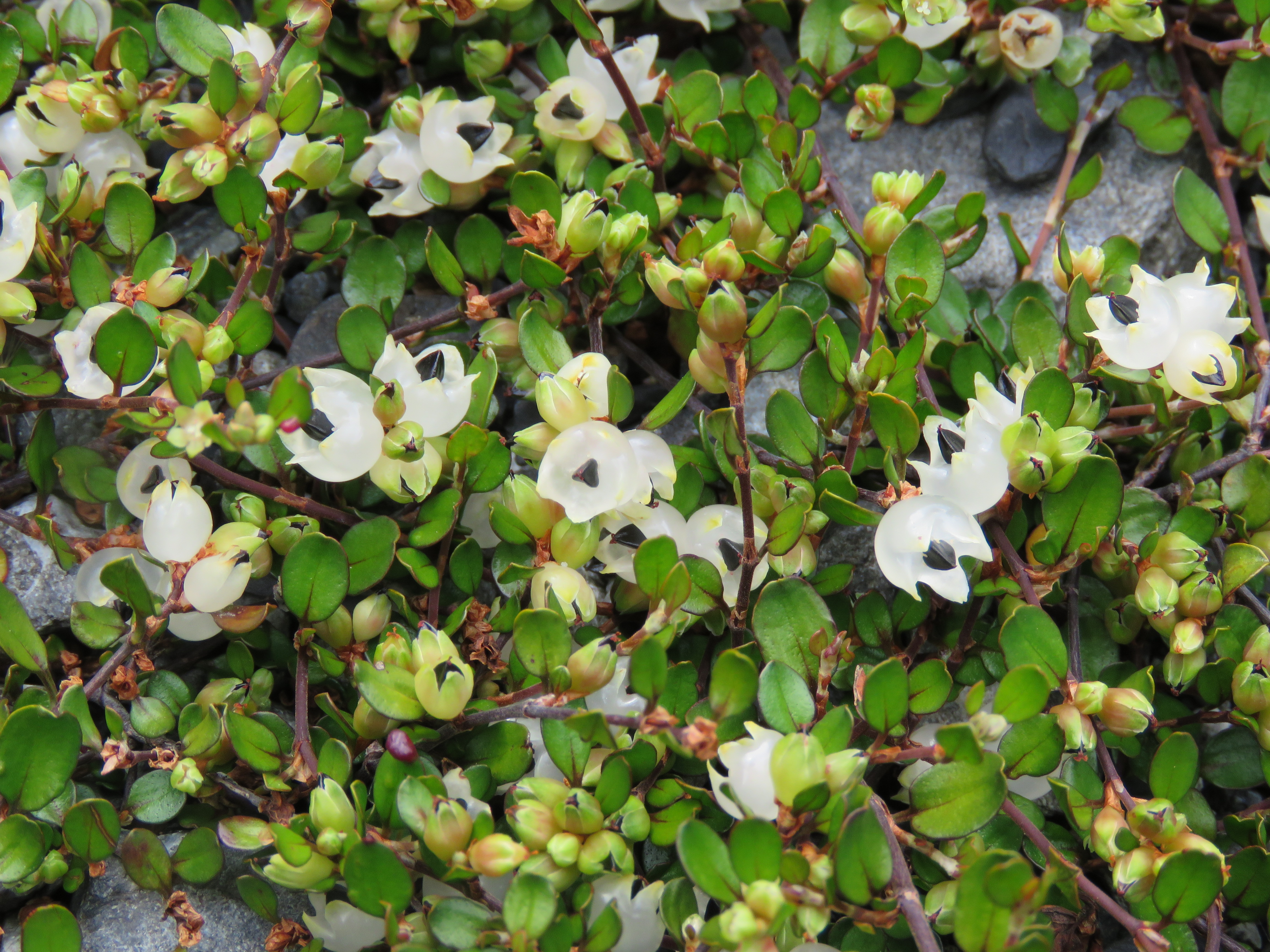
Fruiting in Arthur's Pass National Park. Multiple stages of fruit development and even a couple of flowers can be seen in this image.

== Taxonomy ==
The species was first described by Joseph Dalton Hooker in 1847, who used the name "Polygonum (Muhlenbeckia) axillaris". Both Stephan Endlicher (in 1848) and Wilhelm Gerhard Walpers (in 1849) later referred to it as just Muehlenbeckia axillaris.
