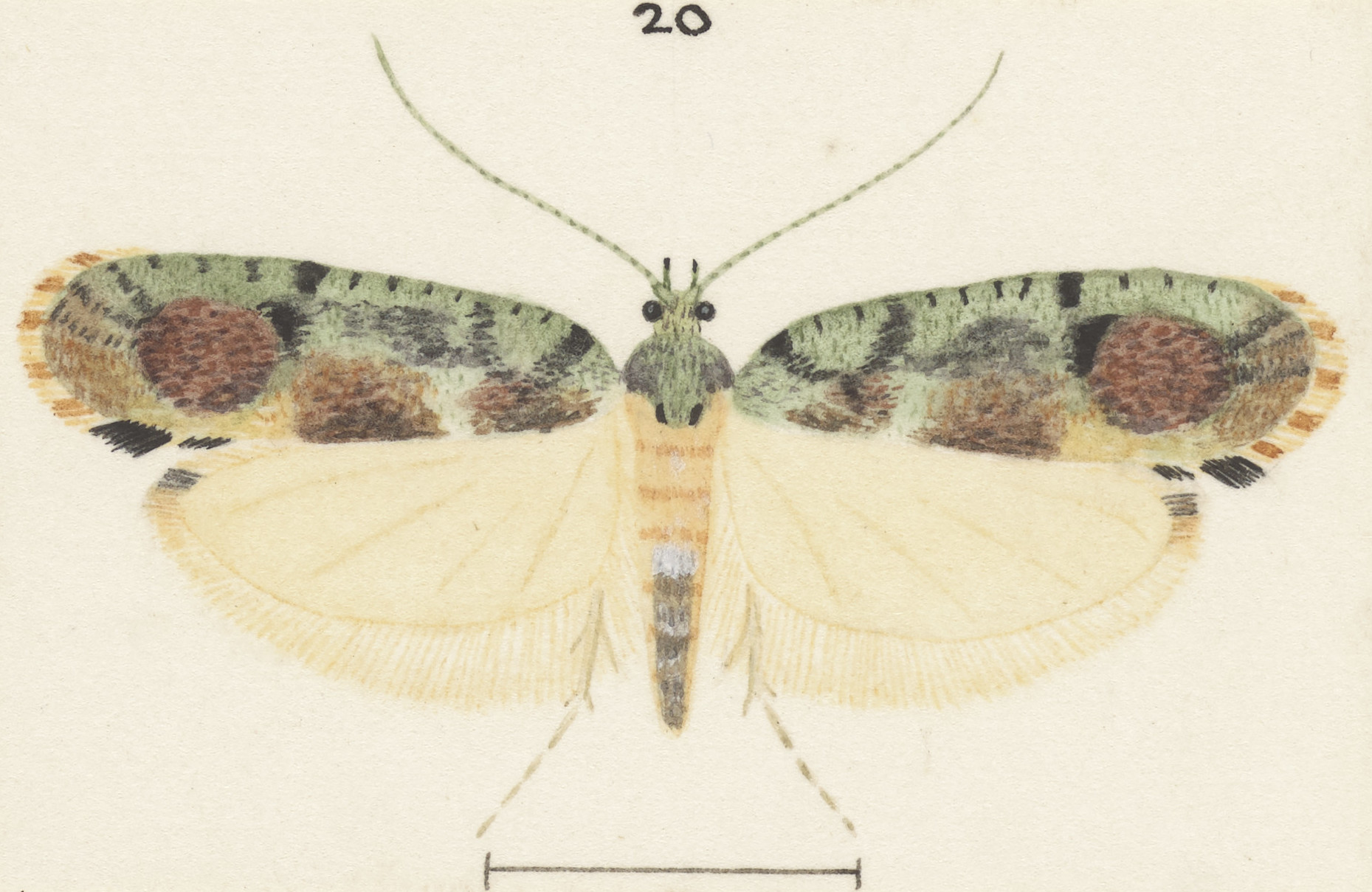
- Illustration of male

Scientific classification
- Kingdom: Animalia
- Phylum: Arthropoda
- Class: Insecta
- Order: Lepidoptera
- Family: Plutellidae
- Genus: Orthenches
- Species: O. vinitincta

Binomial name
- Orthenches vinitincta Philpott, 1917

= Orthenches vinitincta =

Species of moth endemic to New Zealand

Orthenches vinitincta is a moth of the family Plutellidae first described by Alfred Philpott in 1917. It is endemic to New Zealand.
