= Muehlenbeckia australis =

- Foliage of M. australis

Conservation status
- Not Threatened (NZ TCS)

Scientific classification
- Kingdom: Plantae
- Clade: Tracheophytes
- Clade: Angiosperms
- Clade: Eudicots
- Order: Caryophyllales
- Family: Polygonaceae
- Genus: Muehlenbeckia
- Species: M. australis

Binomial name
- Muehlenbeckia australis (G.Forst.) Meisn.

Synonyms
- Coccoloba australis G.Forst.; Polygonum australe (G.Forst.) A.Rich., nom. illeg.; Muehlenbeckia adpressa (Labill.) Meisn.

Species of flowering plant

Muehlenbeckia australis, commonly known as the large-leaved muehlenbeckia or pōhuehue, is a species of climbing plant in the family Polygonaceae. It is native to Norfolk Island and New Zealand, where its range extends across the mainland, Stewart Island, and the Manawatāwhi / Three Kings Islands. A fast-spreading and sometimes aggressive species, it is widely considered a pest plant, smothering vegetation and forming tangles of thickets.

The plant was first described in 1786 by the German botanist Georg Forster. M. australis's small flowers are pollinated by insects. The seeds are dispersed by fruit-eating animals (frugivores), such as birds and lizards. The plant provides host to many types of insects, such as moths, beetles, aphids, and gall mites. The indigenous Māori people ate the berries from the plant, and the stems were used to make fish traps. The plant's 2023 conservation status in the New Zealand Threat Classification System is "Not Threatened"

== Description ==
Muehlenbeckia australis is a rampant climbing plant which reaches lengths of 15 metres (50 feet), or potentially longer. The bark is either dark brown, black, or grey in colour. The primary plant stem is up to 0.1 m (4 in) in diameter. They are flexible, and the branches are often tangled or interlaced. The branches are 10–20 mm in diameter.

Leaves are heart-shaped and are arranged in an alternating pattern. They are thin and glabrous. The petioles are usually 20–25 mm long, green to red, maroon, or black. Juvenile leaves are 10–30 × 5–10 mm long, and they have a pointed tip. They are light green to green in colour. The leaf margins can be red to maroon in colour. Adult leaves are usually 20–80 × 10–30 mm long, broadly egg-shaped to oblong, with smooth but often wavy edges. They are light green to dark green in colour. The leaf margins can also be red to maroon in colour.

The inflorescences (flower clusters) are arranged in panicles which are 100–150 × 100 mm long. Flowering can occur year-round. Flowers are greenish to cream in colour, and are 4–5 mm in diameter. The tepals are 5.0–6.0 × 1.5–2.0 mm long. The pedicels are 0.4–1.2 mm long and green. Fruiting can occur year-round. Fruits are white or ice-coloured. The seeds are small, and they can vary in colour. M. australis has a diploid chromosome count of 20.

== Taxonomy ==
The species was first described in 1786 by Georg Forster as Coccoloba australis in the Florulae Insularum Australium Prodromus. The species was transferred to the genus Muehlenbeckia in 1839 by Carl Meissner. There are four recognised homotypic synonyms of the species. There are 27 species of the genus Muehlenbeckia currently accepted by the Plants of the World Online taxonomic database. These species are native to the Americas, Australasia, and Papuasia.

Research from 2011 suggests that M. australis is a sister species to a clade (group) that contains the South and Central American species of the genus. The estimated divergence time of M. australis from the South and Central American clade was about 12.5–13.1 million years ago.

=== Etymology ===
The etymology of M. australis's genus name, Muehlenbeckia, honours the bryologist Heinrich Gustav Mühlenbeck. The specific epithet (second part of the scientific name), australis, means 'southern'. The species is commonly known as 'pōhuehue' and 'large-leaved muehlenbeckia'. Coyne (2011) lists 'shrubby creeper' as a vernacular name. The Māori name pōhuehue is cognated with pōhue, a term used in East Polynesia for other unrelated vines. The plant has three recorded Māori names; heruna, pōhuehue, and puka.

== Ecology ==
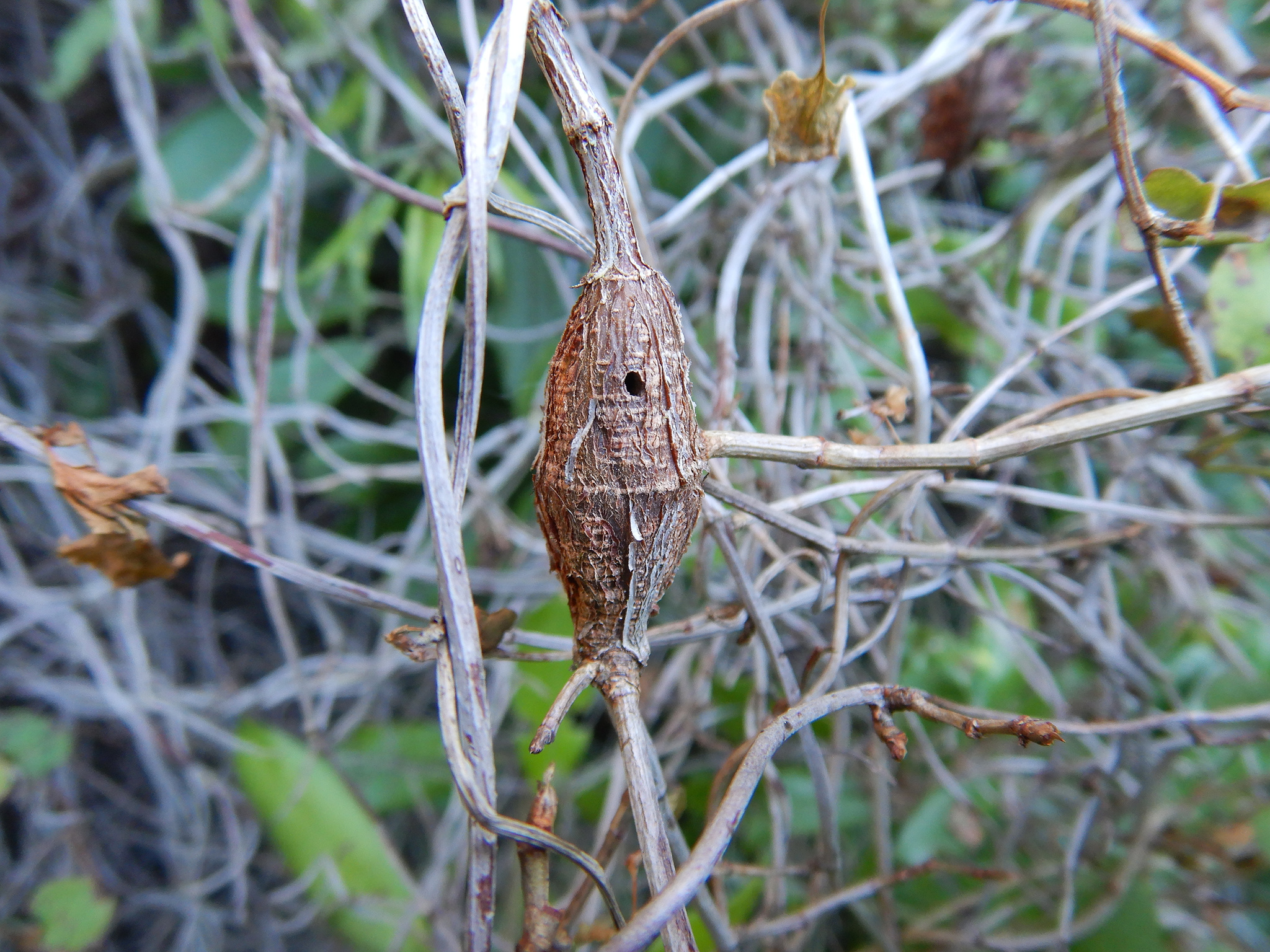
Long swellings on the woody stems are the work of Morova subfasciata larvae

M. australis plays host to the butterfly Lycaena feredayi

Muehlenbeckia australis's seeds are dispersed by fruit-eating animals (frugivores), such as birds and lizards. Lizard frugivores include the New Zealand common gecko (Woodworthia maculata) and the Stephen's Island gecko (Toropuku stephensi). Several birds have been recorded as seed dispersers, including tūī (Prosthemadera novaeseelandiae), kererū (Hemiphaga novaeseelandiae), New Zealand bellbirds (Anthornis melanura), and silvereyes (Zosterops lateralis). M. australis's small flowers are pollinated by insects, including two beetle species.

Muehlenbeckia australis is a host to numerous insects, including the larvae of Bityla defigurata, Pyrgotis eudorana, Meterana coeleno, and Lycaena feredayi. The larvae of Wiseana signata also possibly feed on it. Long swellings on the woody stems are the work of Morova subfasciata larvae. Pimple-like galls on the leaves are the result of a Eriophyes gall mite. M. australis also plays host to aphids, beetles, psyllidae, scale insects, mirids, and weevils. Leaves are freely eaten by possums. M. australis can be semideciduous or deciduous in some southern localities at the end of winter. The terms semideciduous and deciduous refer to plants that lose their leaves, either partially or entirely, respectively.

== Distribution ==
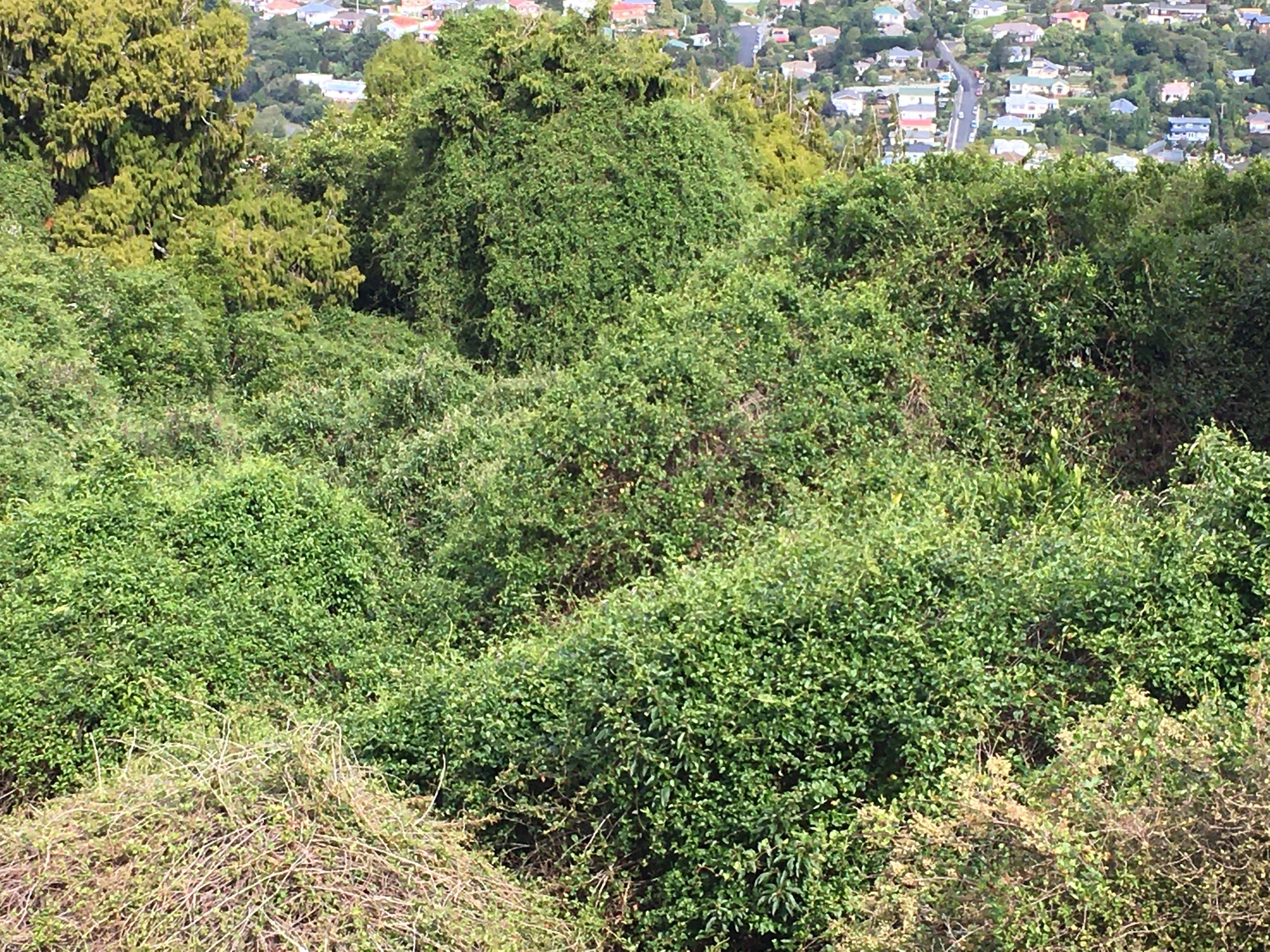
Muehlenbeckia australis often forms thickets and smothers the vegetation, as seen here in Dunedin.

Muehlenbeckia australis is native to New Zealand and Norfolk Island, which is an external territory of Australia. Its range covers mainland New Zealand, that is, the North Island and South Island, and it is also present on the Three Kings Islands and Stewart Island. M. australis's presence on Norfolk Island has decreased significantly. According to Coyne (2011), a 1914 account described the plant as common on the island, but only 100 individuals were known to exist by 2003. The New Zealand botanist Peter de Lange stated that Muehlenbeckia specimens from the Chatham Islands should be regarded as a separate species in their own right, as they are genetically distinct from M. australis, and they differ by their larger leaves among other various characteristics. Its conservation status in the New Zealand Threat Classification System was assessed in 2023 as "Not Threatened".

=== Habitat ===
Muehlenbeckia australis is found in coastal to lower montane environments. It is often found in disturbed environments, including shrublands and regenerating vegetation. It reaches 600 m (2,000 ft) above sea level at maximum elevation. A fast-spreading and sometimes aggressive species, it is widely considered a pest plant, smothering vegetation and forming tangles of thickets. M. australis is commonly associated with ongaonga (Urtica ferox) near Nugget Point.

== Uses ==
The indigenous Māori people ate the berries raw, which have been described to have a sweet and juicy taste and they were popular with children. In Australia, a similar Muehlenbeckia plant had its berries used in the making of desserts. M. australis's stems were also used by Māori to make fish traps.

== Works cited ==
Books

- Allan, H.H (1961). Flora of New Zealand. Vol. 1. P D Hasselberg Government Printer Publications. ISBN 9780477010566.
- Cockayne, Leonard (1921). The Vegetation of New Zealand. New York City, United States: G E Stechert & Co.
- Coyne, Peter (2011). Norfolk Island's Fascinating Flora. Belconnen, ACT: Petaurus Press. ISBN 978-0-9806528-5-7.
- Crowe, Andrew (2009). Which Native Forest Plant?. Auckland, New Zealand: Penguin Books. ISBN 978-0-14-300901-6.
- Quattrocchi, Umberto (2023). CRC World Dictionary of Medicinal and Poisonous Plants: Common Names, Scientific Names, Eponyms, Synonyms, and Etymology. Boca Raton, Fla: CRC. ISBN 978-1-4200-8044-5.

Journals

- Arnold, B.C. (1966). "A Stem Gall on Muehlenbeckia australis (Forst. f.) Caused by the Moth Morova subfasciata Walk". University of Hawaiʻi Press. ISSN 0030-8870.
- Burrows, C. J. (1996). "Germination Behaviour of the Seeds of Seven New Zealand Vine Species". New Zealand Journal of Botany. 34 (1): 93–102. doi:10.1080/0028825X.1996.10412696. ISSN 0028-825X.
- Dugdale, J. S. (1971). "Entomology of the Aucklands and other Islands South of New Zealand: Lepidoptera, Excluding non-Crambine Pyralidae" (PDF). Pacific Insects Monograph. 27: 72.
- Gaskin, D. E. (1966). "New Zealand Noctuidae (Lepidoptera): summary of known host plants and a bibliography relevant to the biology of the group". New Zealand Entomologist. 3 (5): 19–27. doi:10.1080/00779962.1966.9722858. ISSN 0077-9962.
- Grehan, J. R. (1983). "Record of Wiseana signata (Walker) (Lepidoptera: Hepialidae) larvae in sand dunes". New Zealand Entomologist. 7 (4): 417–418. doi:10.1080/00779962.1983.9722433. ISSN 0077-9962.
- Manson, D.C.M. (1984). Fauna of New Zealand 4: Eriophyoidea except Eriophyinae (Arachnida: Acari). Ministry of Agriculture. doi:10.7931/j2/fnz.4.
- McGlone, Matt S.; Dungan, Roger J.; Hall, Graeme M.J.; Allen, Robert B. (2004). "Winter Leaf Loss in the New Zealand Woody Flora". New Zealand Journal of Botany. 42 (1): 1–19. doi:10.1080/0028825X.2004.9512887. ISSN 0028-825X.
- Owen, Hamish J.; Norton, David A. (1995). "The Diet of Introduced Brushtail Possums Trichosurus vulpecula in a Low-Diversity New Zealand Nothofagus Forest and Possible Implications for Conservation Management". Biological Conservation. 71 (3): 339–345. doi:10.1016/0006-3207(94)00058-X.
- Schuster, Tanja M.; Wilson, Karen L.; Kron, Kathleen A. (2011). "Phylogenetic Relationships of Muehlenbeckia, Fallopia, and Reynoutria (Polygonaceae) Investigated with Chloroplast and Nuclear Sequence Data". International Journal of Plant Sciences. 172 (8): 1053–1066. doi:10.1086/661293. ISSN 1058-5893.
- Schuster, Tanja M.; Setaro, Sabrina D.; Kron, Kathleen A. (5 April 2013). "Age Estimates for the Buckwheat Family Polygonaceae Based on Sequence Data Calibrated by Fossils and with a Focus on the Amphi-Pacific Muehlenbeckia". PLOS ONE. 8 (4) e61261. doi:10.1371/journal.pone.0061261. ISSN 1932-6203.
- Wotton, Debra M; Drake, Donald R; Powlesland, Ralph G; Ladley, Jenny J (2016). "The Role of Lizards as Seed Dispersers in New Zealand". Journal of the Royal Society of New Zealand. 46 (1): 40–65. doi:10.1080/03036758.2015.1108924. ISSN 0303-6758.

Websites

- De Lange, Peter (2022). "Muehlenbeckia australis". New Zealand Plant Conservation Network. Archived from the original on 12 March 2026.
- "Muehlenbeckia Meisn". Plants of the World Online. Archived from the original on 29 April 2025 – via Royal Botanic Gardens, Kew.
- "Muehlenbeckia australis (G.Forst.) Meisn". Plants of the World Online. Archived from the original on 15 April 2025 – via Royal Botanic Gardens, Kew.
- "Ngā Rauropi Whakaoranga — Muehlenbeckia australis. Large-leaved muehlenbeckia". Manaaki Whenua – Landcare Research. 2023. Archived from the original on 3 February 2025.
