= Heinrich Gustav Mühlenbeck =

Alsatian physician (1798–1845)

Heinrich Gustav Mühlenbeck, name also given as Henri Gustave Muehlenbeck (2 June 1798, Sainte-Marie-aux-Mines – 21 November 1845, Mulhouse) was an Alsatian medical doctor and botanical collector known for his work with bryophytes.

He studied medicine and surgery in Strasbourg and Paris. In 1822 he became a general practitioner in Gebweiler, and from 1833 onward, lived and worked in Mühlhausen. He was a founding member of the Société médicale du Haut-Rhin.

During his career, he collaborated with Jean-Baptiste Mougeot, a botanist known for his investigations of flora native to Vosges. He is remembered for his investigations of Swiss cryptogamic flora; in 1839 he accompanied Philipp Bruch and Wilhelm Philippe Schimper on a botanical excursion to the Alps, and in 1844 journeyed to the canton of Graubünden.

In 1841 the genus Muehlenbeckia was named in his honor by Swiss botanist Carl Meissner. Also, taxa with the specific epithet of muehlenbeckii are named after him; some examples being: Grimmia muehlenbeckii, Dicranum muehlenbeckii and Bryum muehlenbeckii (Muehlenbeck's thread-moss).
