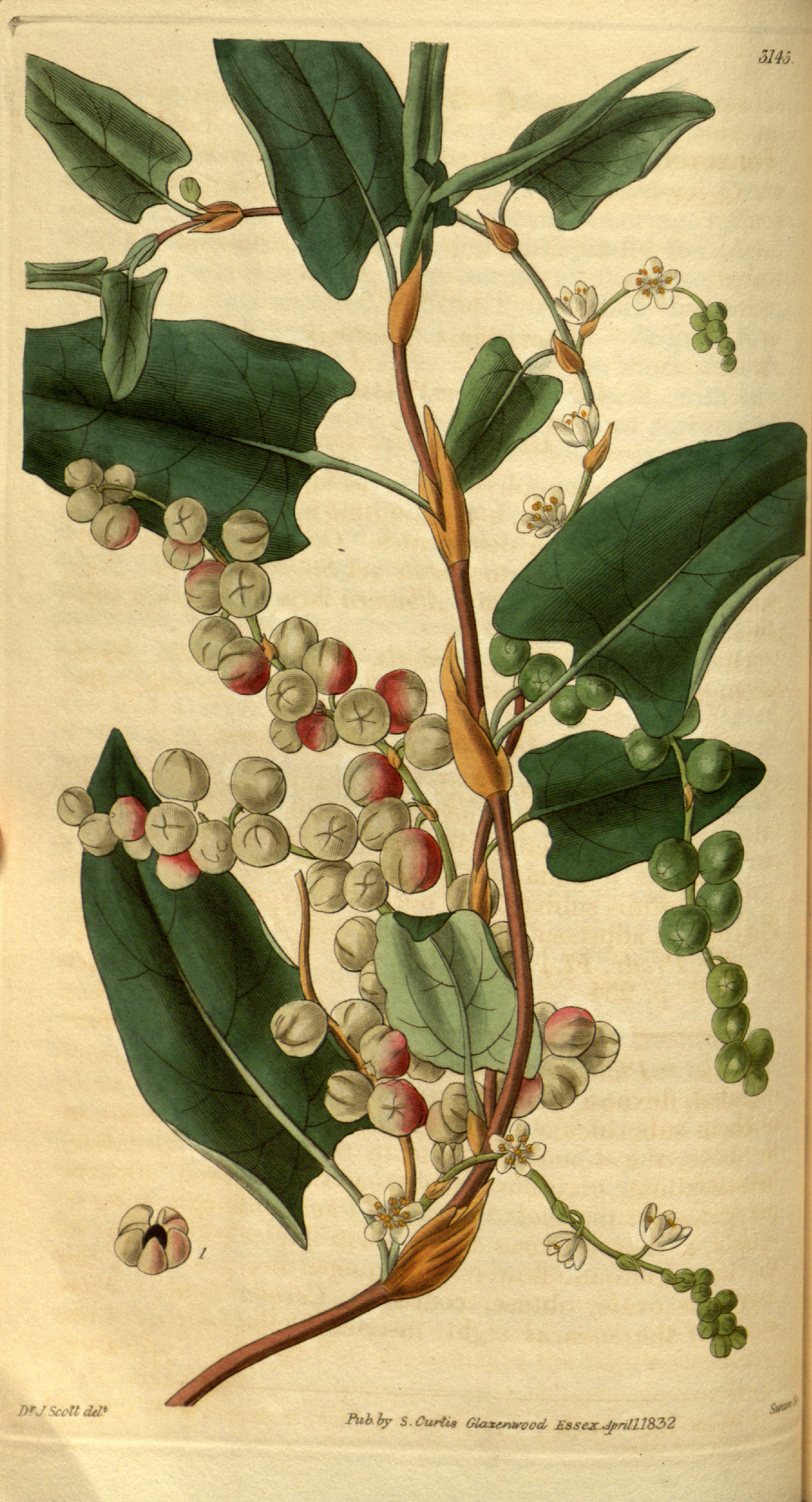
- Muehlenbeckia adpressa

Scientific classification
- Kingdom: Plantae
- Clade: Embryophytes
- Clade: Tracheophytes
- Clade: Angiosperms
- Clade: Eudicots
- Order: Caryophyllales
- Family: Polygonaceae
- Subfamily: Polygonoideae
- Genus: Muehlenbeckia; Meisn.

Synonyms
- Calacinum Raf; Homalocladium (F. Muell.) L. H. Bailey; Karkinetron Raf.; Sarcogonum G.Don

= Muehlenbeckia =

Genus of flowering plants

Muehlenbeckia or maidenhair is a genus of flowering plants in the family Polygonaceae. It is native to the borders of the Pacific, including South and North America, Papua New Guinea and Australasia. It has been introduced elsewhere, including Europe. Species vary in their growth habits, many being vines or shrubs. In some environments, rampant species can become weedy and difficult to eradicate.

== Description ==
Species of Muehlenbeckia vary considerably in their growth habits; they may be perennials, vinelike, or shrubs. All have rhizomatous roots. Their leaves are arranged alternately on the stem, usually with stalks (petioles), but sometimes stalkless (sessile). The brownish ocrea is short and tubular, soon disintegrating. The inflorescences may be terminal or axillary, and are in the form of spikes or clusters, with at most very short peduncles (flowering stems). Individual flowers have pedicels (stalks). The flowers may be bisexual or unisexual, with sometimes a mixture of staminate, pistillate and bisexual flowers on the same plant. There are five white to greenish white tepals, joined at the base. Staminate flowers have 8 (sometimes 9) stamens and a rudimentary pistil. Pistillate flowers have rudimentary stamens and three spreading styles. The fruit is in the form of a black or dark brown unwinged achene, three-sided to more or less globe-shaped, at least partly enclosed by the persistent tepals.

== Taxonomy ==
The genus was erected by Carl Meissner in 1841, initially for two species that he distinguished from Coccoloba and Polygonum. The generic name honours Alsatian bryologist Heinrich Gustav Mühlenbeck (1798–1845).

Muehlenbeckia is placed in the tribe Polygoneae of the subfamily Polygonoideae. Within the tribe, it is most closely related to the genera Reynoutria and Fallopia s.s., forming the so-called "RMF clade".

- Polygoneae
  - Knorringia
  - - - Polygonum ciliinode (syn. Fallopia ciliinodis)
      - DAP clade
        - Duma
        - - Atraphaxis
          - Polygonum
    - RMF clade
      - Reynoutria
      - - Muehlenbeckia
        - Fallopia s.s.

Below is a phylogenetic tree of the Muehlenbeckia genus, reproduced from Desjardins et al. (2023).

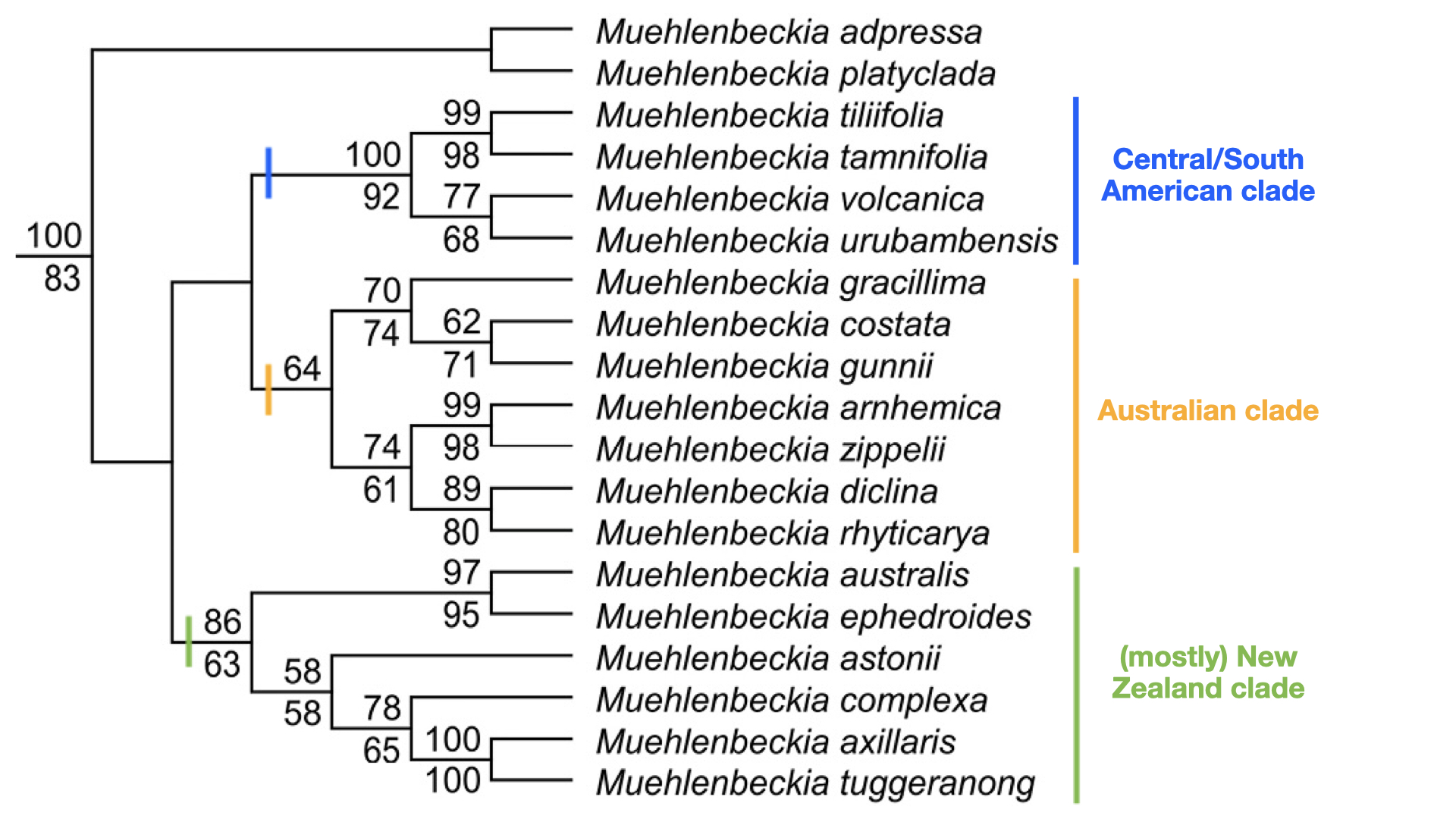
Phylogeny of Muehlenbeckia based on Desjardins et al. (2023). Bootstrap support values (≥ 50%) are shown for both Maximum Likelihood (above) and Maximum Parsimony (below), respectively. The original figure has been modified to include the coloured lines, showing the groupings of three distinct subclades.

In the above phylogeny, three notable subclades can be distinguished: a Central/South American clade, an Australian clade, and a (predominantly) New Zealand clade, which also includes the Australian endemic M. tuggeranong. The coloured lines on the phylogeny show the likely point at which an ancestral species gave rise to all the descendants belonging to that particular clade. Finally, it may be noted that two species were not placed within any notable clade: M. platyclada and M. adpressa. Although the exact relationship between these two species is unresolved (in terms of how closely related they are to one another), it appears highly likely that they belong to a basal branch which is the sister group to the remaining species of the Muehlenbeckia genus.

=== Species ===
As of October 2025, Plants of the World Online accepts 27 species.

- Muehlenbeckia adpressa (Labill.) Meisn. – climbing lignum, shrubby creeper, pohuehue
- Muehlenbeckia andina Brandbyge
- Muehlenbeckia arnhemica K.L.Wilson & Makinson
- Muehlenbeckia astonii Petrie – shrubby tororaro, wiggy-wig bush
- Muehlenbeckia australis (G.Forst.) Meisn.
- Muehlenbeckia axillaris (Hook. f.) Walp. – sprawling wirevine
- Muehlenbeckia complexa (A. Cunn.) Meisn. – maidenhair vine, creeping wire vine, lacy wire vine, mattress vine, mattress wire weed, necklace vine, wire vine
- Muehlenbeckia costata K.L.Wilson & Makinson
- Muehlenbeckia diclina (F.Muell.) F.Muell. – slender lignum
- Muehlenbeckia ephedroides (Hook. f.) Hook. f. – leafless pohuehue or leafless muehlenbeckia
- Muehlenbeckia fruticulosa (Walp.) Standl.
- Muehlenbeckia gracillima Meisn.
- Muehlenbeckia gunnii (Hook.f.) Endl. – coastal lignum
- Muehlenbeckia hastulata (Sm.) I.M. Johnst. – wirevine
- Muehlenbeckia monticola Pulle
- Muehlenbeckia nummularia H.Gross
- Muehlenbeckia platyclada (F.Muell.) Meisn.
- Muehlenbeckia polybotrya Meisn.
- Muehlenbeckia rhyticarya Benth.
- Muehlenbeckia sagittifolia Meisn.
- Muehlenbeckia tamnifolia (Kunth) Meisn.
- Muehlenbeckia tiliifolia Wedd.
- Muehlenbeckia triloba Danser
- Muehlenbeckia tuggeranong Mallinson – Tuggeranong lignum
- Muehlenbeckia urubambensis Brandbyge
- Muehlenbeckia volcanica (Benth.) Endl.
- Muehlenbeckia zippelii (Meisn.) Danser

Three species have been transferred to the genus Duma:

- Muehlenbeckia coccoloboides J.M.Black → Duma coccoloboides
- Muehlenbeckia florulenta Meisn. – tangled lignum → Duma florulenta
- Muehlenbeckia horrida H.Gross → Duma horrida

== Distribution ==
Native
Australasia:

Australia: Australian Capital Territory, New South Wales, Norfolk Island, Northern Territory, Queensland, South Australia, Tasmania, Victoria, Western Australia
New Zealand: Chatham Islands, New Zealand North, New Zealand South
Papuasia: New Guinea

Neotropic:

Central America: Honduras
Southern South America: Chile

== Invasiveness ==
All members of the RMF clade appear to have the potential to become invasive, in some cases via vigorous hybrids. The highly invasive Japanese knotweed (Reynoutria japonica) hybridizes with Muehlenbeckia australis. The related Muehlenbeckia complexa has established populations in southern parts of Britain and in the Channel Islands, and is a problematic invasive species in the San Francisco area.
