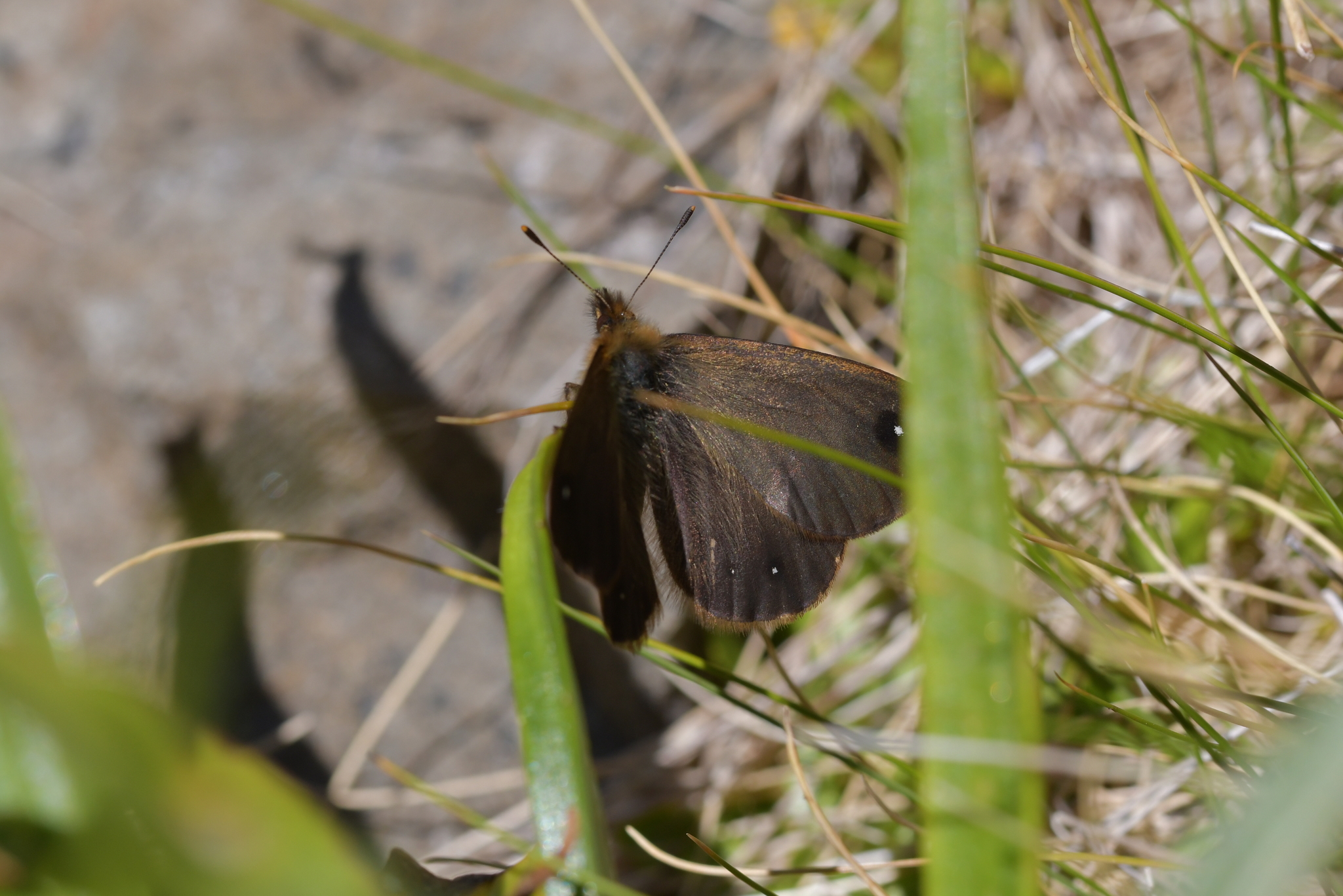
- Upperwings
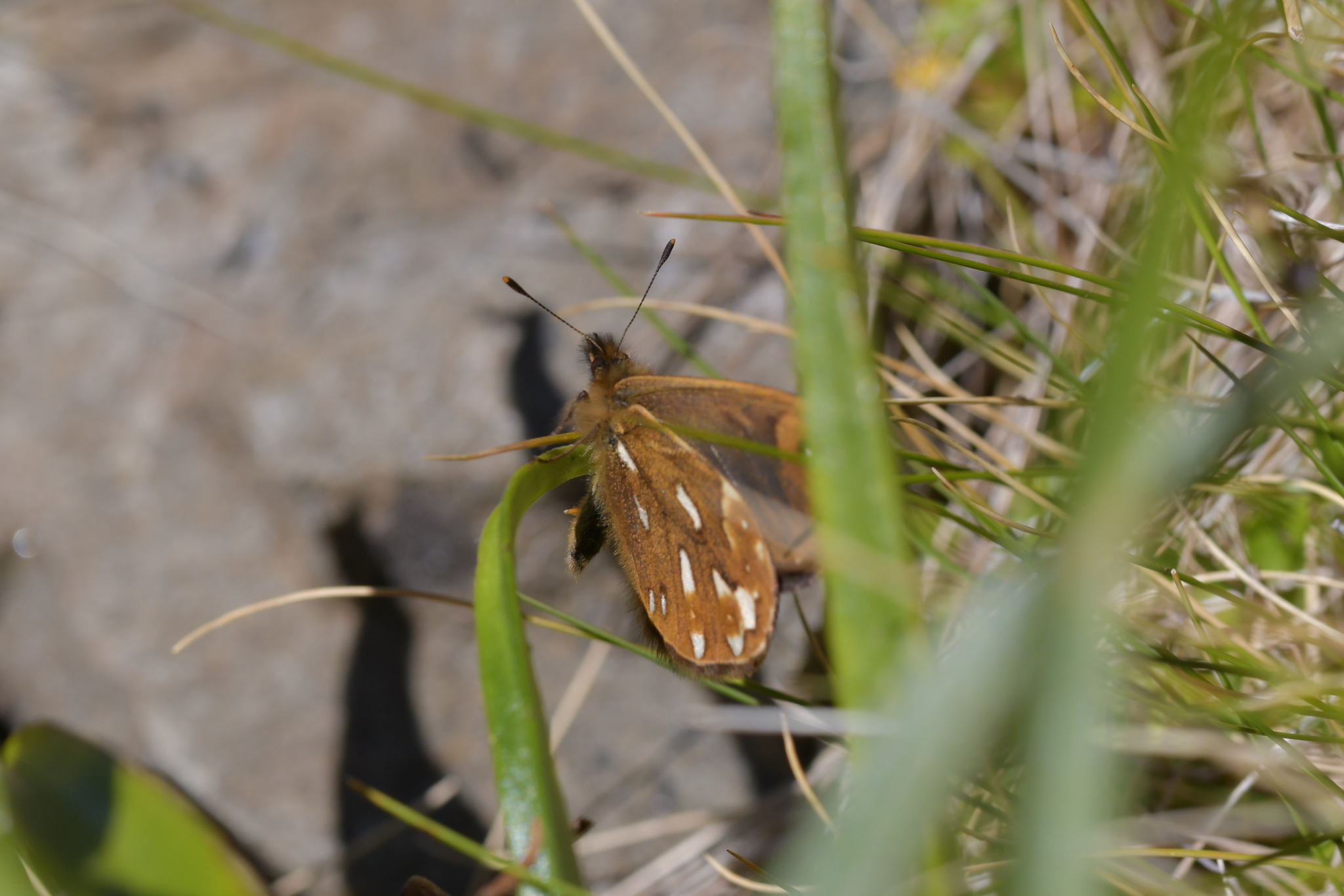
- Underwings

Scientific classification
- Domain: Eukaryota
- Kingdom: Animalia
- Phylum: Arthropoda
- Class: Insecta
- Order: Lepidoptera
- Family: Nymphalidae
- Subfamily: Satyrinae
- Tribe: Satyrini
- Subtribe: Erebiina
- Genus: Erebiola; Fereday, 1879
- Species: E. butleri

Binomial name
- Erebiola butleri Fereday, 1879

= Erebiola =

Species of butterfly

Erebiola butleri, or Butler's ringlet, is an elusive New Zealand endemic butterfly, discovered in 1879 by John Enys at the alpine pass at the head of the Rakaia River. It is the only member of the genus Erebiola.

Erebiola is derived from Erebus, the ancient Greek world of darkness between Earth and Hades, while the specific name, butleri, was after Arthur Gardiner Butler of the British Museum who played a major role in early descriptions of New Zealand butterflies.

Its Māori name is pepe pouri, which means dark moth, and shares the name with the black mountain ringlet and the forest ringlet butterfly.

== Description ==
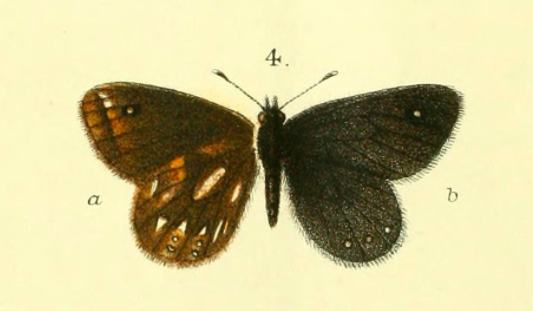

Butler's ringlet has a wingspan of 35–43 mm, with a 40 mm average for males and a 37 mm average for females.

Both males and females are smoky brown, though males tend towards the richer browns while the females tend towards the paler browns. The underside of the hindwing has wedge-shaped silvery-white marks.

Both the underside and the topside of the wings have eyespots at the distal-most ends, surrounded by reddish-brown shading. There is variation between individuals in the number of eyespots, the extent of the reddish-brown colouring around the eyespots, and the silvery-white markings on the undersides of the hindwings.

The egg is ivory with vertical ribbing. The larvae are similar coloured from head to tail, being yellow brown with dark and light lateral striping. A fully grown larva is roughly 20 mm long. The pupa is grey and cream with fine black spotting along the abdomen, changing to a brown on the rest of the body. The style of pupation is unknown.

== Life stages ==
The egg is laid singularly on a shrub and hatches after 14 days. The larvae grows from 3 mm to 20 mm over an unknown length of time, before pupating. Pupation lasts about 21 days. It is unknown how long adult E. butleri live for.

== Distribution ==
Butler's ringlet is confined to the subalpine zone in the South Island. It has been identified at only a few sites along the main divide of the Southern Alps.

It favours subalpine terraces at altitudes of 900 to 1300 m in areas of snow-tussock with Hebe and Dracophyllum shrubs. Its preferred locations are often damp, almost boggy, or next to mountain lakes. It is very difficult to find even in areas where it has previously been seen, and so little is known about its actual range.

Museum specimen records identified it as active from 27 December to 11 March. It is known to be able to remain aloft for long periods of time and to cover great distances.

== Similar species ==
Butler's ringlet appears very similar to some species of the genus Erebia, and was included in that genus until 1967, when Erebia butleri was reclassified as Erebiola butleri due to structural differences found between butleri and other members of the genus Erebia.

Butler's ringlet is visually similar to the black mountain ringlet, Percnodaimon pluto. The two species may be differentiated by where the individual in question is sighted. Butler's ringlet prefers to fly over vegetation, settling among snow-tussock, subalpine shrubs and herbaceous flowers, whereas the black mountain ringlet tends to congregate over rock and scree.

== See also ==
- Butterflies of New Zealand
