= Argyrophenga harrisi =

Conservation status
- Not Threatened (NZ TCS)

Scientific classification
- Kingdom: Animalia
- Phylum: Arthropoda
- Clade: Pancrustacea
- Class: Insecta
- Order: Lepidoptera
- Family: Nymphalidae
- Genus: Argyrophenga
- Species: A. harrisi

Binomial name
- Argyrophenga harrisi Craw, 1978

Species of butterfly

Argyrophenga harrisi, Harris's tussock, tussock ringlet or the Nelson tussock, is a species of butterfly belonging to the family Nymphalidae, the brush-footed butterflies, and the subfamily Satyrinae, the browns. This butterfly is endemic to New Zealand's South Island.

== Taxonomy ==
Argyrophenga harrisi was first formally described in 1978 by the New Zealand entomologist Robin C. Craw with its type locality given as Blue Creek, Taplin's Mount Owen massif, Nelson, New Zealand. This butterfy belongs to the genus Argyrophenga, which contains two other species A. antipodum and A. janitae, a genus endemic to New Zealand. This genus is classified in the tribe Satyrini in the brown subfamily Satyrinae of the brush-footed butterfly family Nymphalidae.

== Etymology ==
Argyrophenga harrisi has the specific name harrisi, this honours the entomologist Anthony Clifford Harris, in recognition of his work on the insect fauna of New Zealand.

== Description ==
Argyrophenga harrisi has imagos which have a wingspan of 33–44 mm (1.3–1.7 in), with both sexes having a mean wingspan of 40 mm (1.6 in). Both sexes have black spots on the forewing which have two ocelli and a number of black spots, each with a single ocellus, on the hindwing. These ocelli are on the upper surfaces of the wings but may be discerned on their underside. This species has reduced orange wing patches in comparison to related species, and it shows brown scaling which outlines the veins on all wings. The eye-spot may almost wholly cover the orange wing patches. The females have slightly paler golden-yellow wing patches than the males. The distinctive feature of Harris's tussock is that the silver border on the underside of the hindwing does not beyond the silver stripe which joins at the front outer margin, in the common tussock (A. antipodum) this silver border extends farther forward. The larvae are lime green with a white line along the upper sides and reach a length of 28 mm (1.1 in).

== Distribution and habitat ==
Argyrophenga harrisi is endemic to New Zealand where it is found only in the northwest of the South Island, from Nelson south to Lewis Pass at altitudes between 800 and 2,000 m (2,600 and 6,600 ft). This species occurs in montane grasslands where it may be seen alongside its congeners.

== Biology ==
Argyrophenga harrisi caterpillars feed on grasses of the genus Chionochloa, especially C.flavescens in sub-alpine areas, but it will use other grass species. The females lay the eggs singly on the foodplant or drop them as they fly over.> The larvae have 5 instars before the pupate, pupation takes 12-18 days. The imagos have been recorded from mid-November to mid-April, the caterpillars are found throughout the year and may winter in sheltered spots in the tussocks. It is thought that this species probably takes a year to complete its life cycle.
