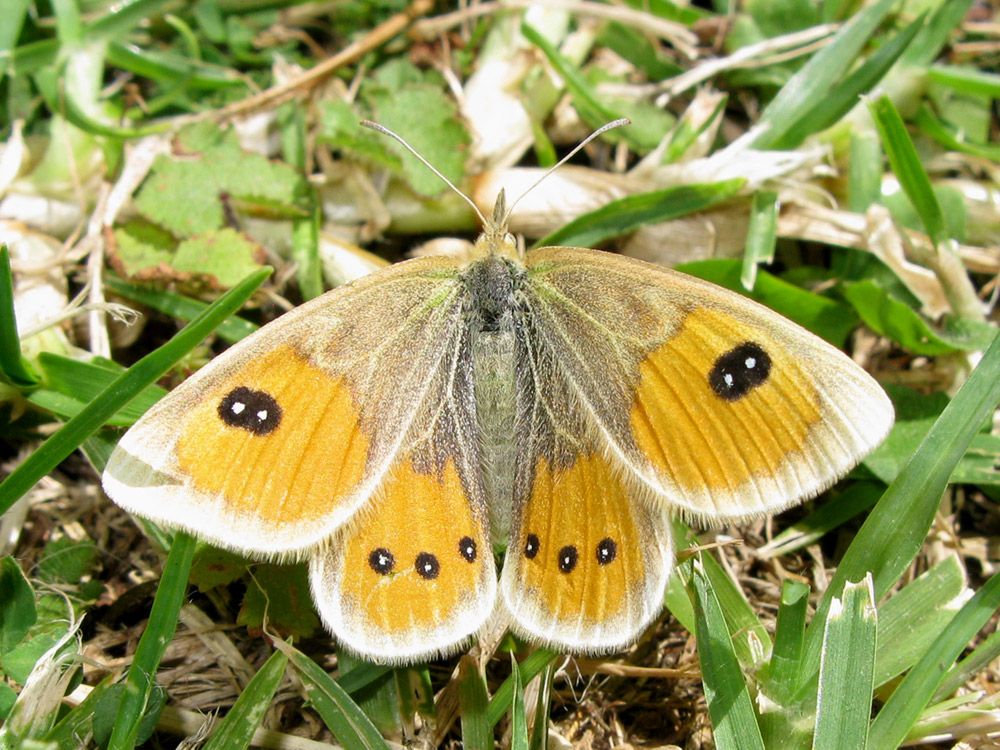
- Argyrophenga antipodum

Scientific classification
- Kingdom: Animalia
- Phylum: Arthropoda
- Clade: Pancrustacea
- Class: Insecta
- Order: Lepidoptera
- Family: Nymphalidae
- Subfamily: Satyrinae
- Tribe: Satyrini
- Subtribe: Hypocystina
- Genus: Argyrophenga; Doubleday, 1845

Species
- See text

= Argyrophenga =

Genus of butterflies

Argyrophenga is a genus of butterflies that are endemic to New Zealand. It comprises three species that are found in the Southern Alps of the South Island of New Zealand.

== Species ==
- Argyrophenga antipodum Doubleday, 1845 – common tussock or tussock ringlet
- Argyrophenga harrisi Craw, 1978 – Harris's tussock
- Argyrophenga janitae Craw, 1978 – Janita's tussock

== See also ==
- Butterflies of New Zealand
