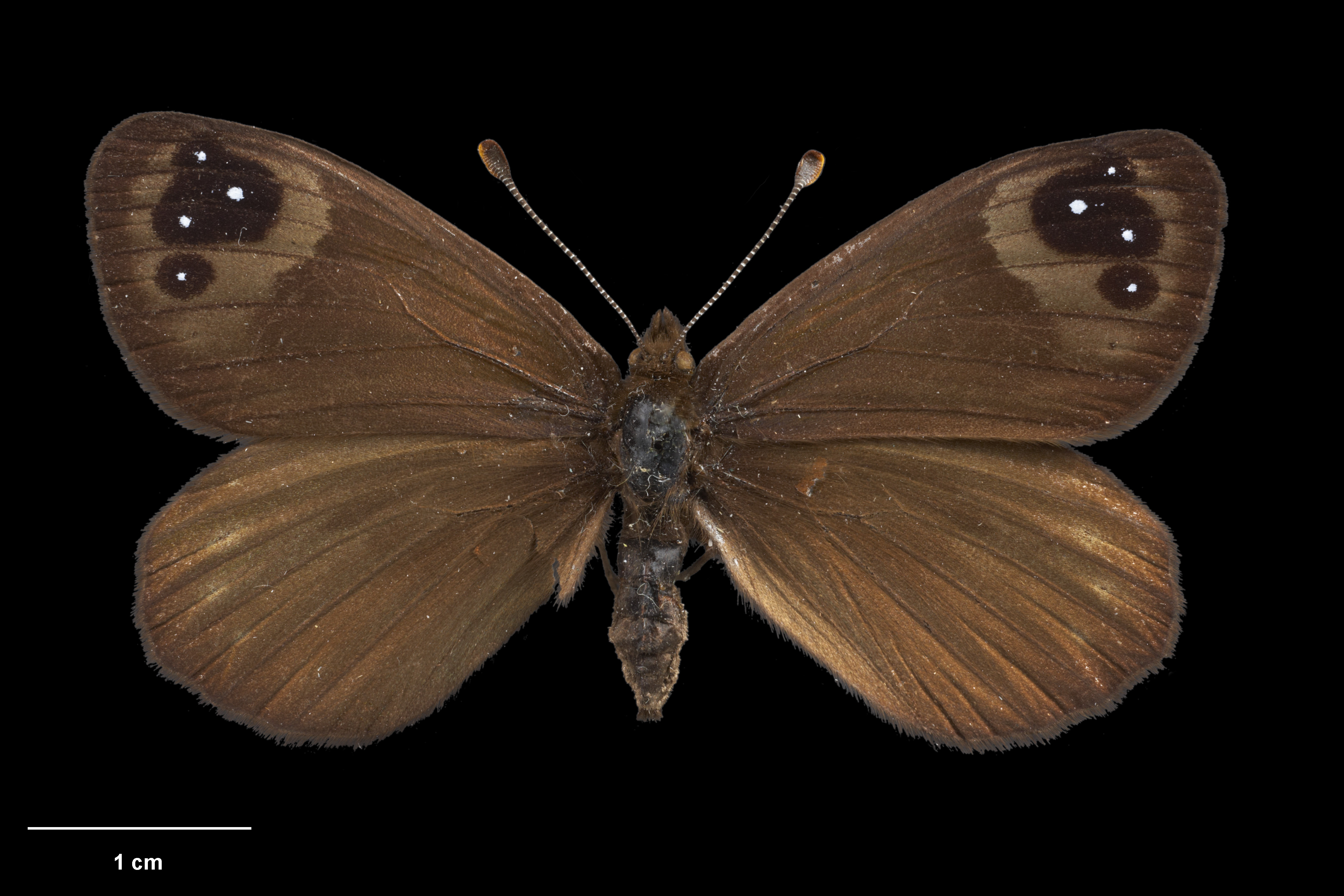

Scientific classification
- Domain: Eukaryota
- Kingdom: Animalia
- Phylum: Arthropoda
- Class: Insecta
- Order: Lepidoptera
- Family: Nymphalidae
- Genus: Percnodaimon; Butler, 1876
- Species: P. merula

Binomial name
- Percnodaimon merula (Hewitson, 1875)

Synonyms
- Erebia pluto Fereday, 1872; Erebia merula Hewitson, 1875; Percnodaimon pluto Butler, 1876; Oreina othello Fereday, 1876

= Percnodaimon =

Genus of butterflies

Percnodaimon merula, the black mountain ringlet, is a satyrid butterfly in the family Nymphalidae. It is currently the only recognised species in the monotypic genus Percnodaimon, endemic to New Zealand, although there may be other undescribed species in the genus. The black mountain ringlet is notable for living exclusively in rocky areas of New Zealand's Southern Alps, usually above 1200 m. Its eggs are laid on rocks, its larvae feed on mountain Poa species, and it pupates under a stone. It has distinctive dark velvety wings and a zig-zag flight pattern over the scree slopes on which it lives.

== Taxonomy ==
This species has had a complicated taxonomic history. It was originally described as Erebia pluto by Richard W. Fereday in 1872 from the Craigieburn Range in the South Island, and was moved to the new genus Percnodaimon by Butler in 1876. It was known as Percnodaimon pluto for many years, and Wise in 1967 regarded this as the correct name for the species, but was eventually synonymised with P. merula, under which name it is usually referred to today.

Most sources consider Percnodaimon monotypic, but in 2012 mitochondrial gene sequencing by Hamish Patrick for his Lincoln University Hons thesis suggested it was a species complex, with up to six species in the genus. In their 2012 guide to South Pacific butterflies, Brian and Hamish Patrick stated there are up to eight species of Percnodaimon still to be described, based on wing shape, pattern, and colour, size, behaviour, and season of emergence. Their species list was as follows:

- Percnodaimon pluto (Fereday, 1872) – the commonest black mountain butterfly of the eastern South Island
- Percnodaimon micans (new status) – described by Augustus Hamilton in 1909 as Erebia pluto var. micans, and found in the Harris and Richardson mountains of Otago
- Percnodaimon sp.nov. 1 – Fiordland mountains from western Otago to Fox Glacier
- Percnodaimon sp.nov. 2 – Pisa Range, Otago
- Percnodaimon sp.nov. 3 – Eyre, Livingstone, and Takitiku Mountains to the south of Lake Wakitipu
- Percnodaimon sp.nov. 4 – Mountains of South Canterbury and North Otago

Although the Patricks stated in 2012 that nuclear DNA was being studied with a view to formally naming and describing these species, as of 2022 that had yet to happen, and P. merula is still considered the only species in the genus.

Its Māori name, pepe pouri, means "dark moth", and is applied to several ringlet species, including the forest ringlet (Dodonidia helmsii) and Butler's ringlet (Erebiola butleri).

== Description ==
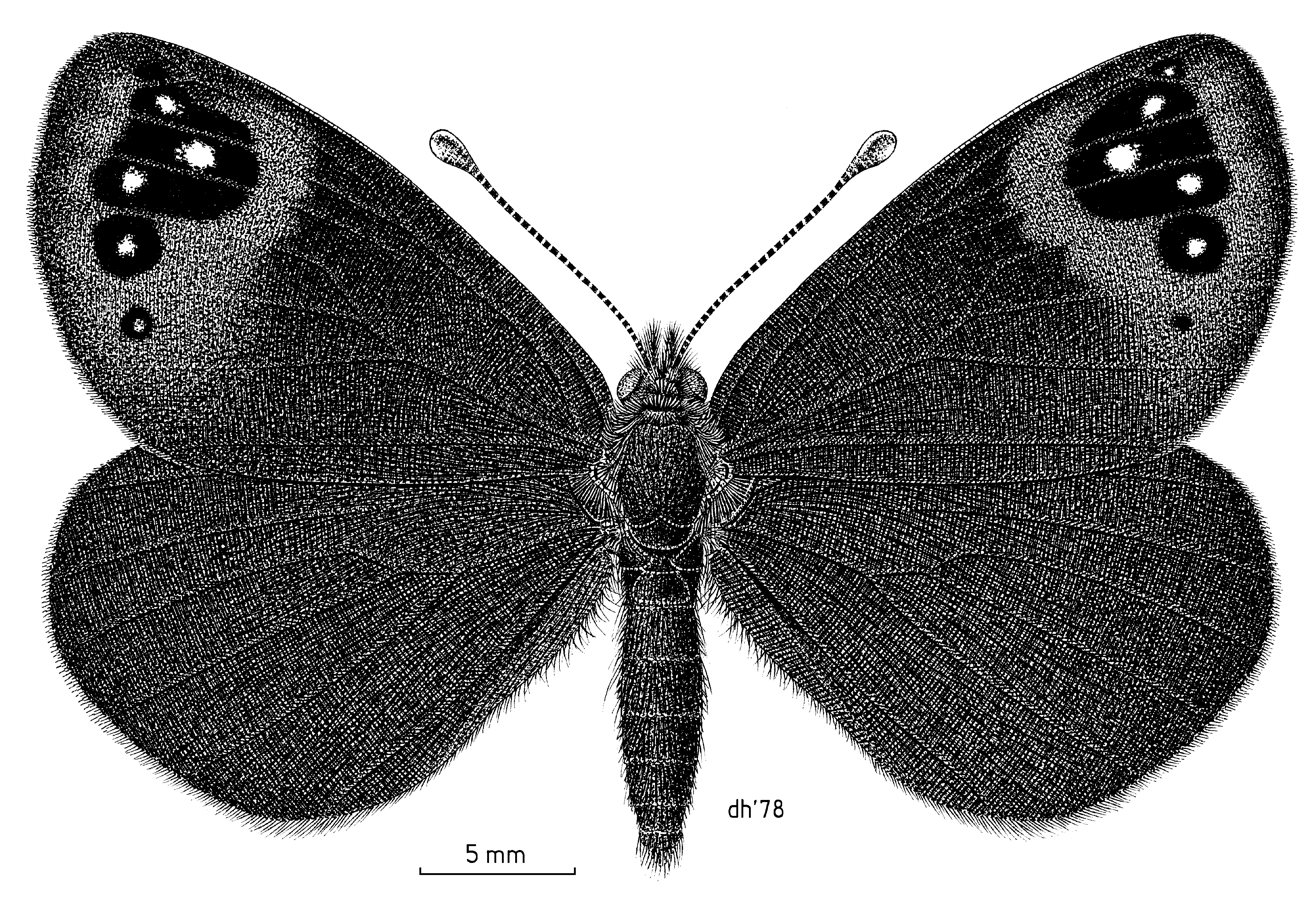
Illustration by Des Helmore

The wingspan of the Percnodaimon imago can be between 35 and 55 mm, and its broad velvety wings are usually black or brown across the dorsal surface, sometimes with a purple reflection. Forewings have characteristic black and white circles inside a patch of brown at their distal ends. There is little sexual dimorphism: males and females are similar in appearance, with females a little larger. The row of large pale spots often found on the underside of the hindwings is more noticeable in females.

Black mountain ringlets fly slowly in zigzag patterns, especially on a sunny day, taking advantage of thermals and often gliding in a "V" position.

"When disturbed this insect flies often with considerable rapidity and thus often eludes the net, so that the capture of a good series of specimens on a rugged mountain-slope is usually very exciting, if not actually dangerous work." —George V. Hudson (1928)

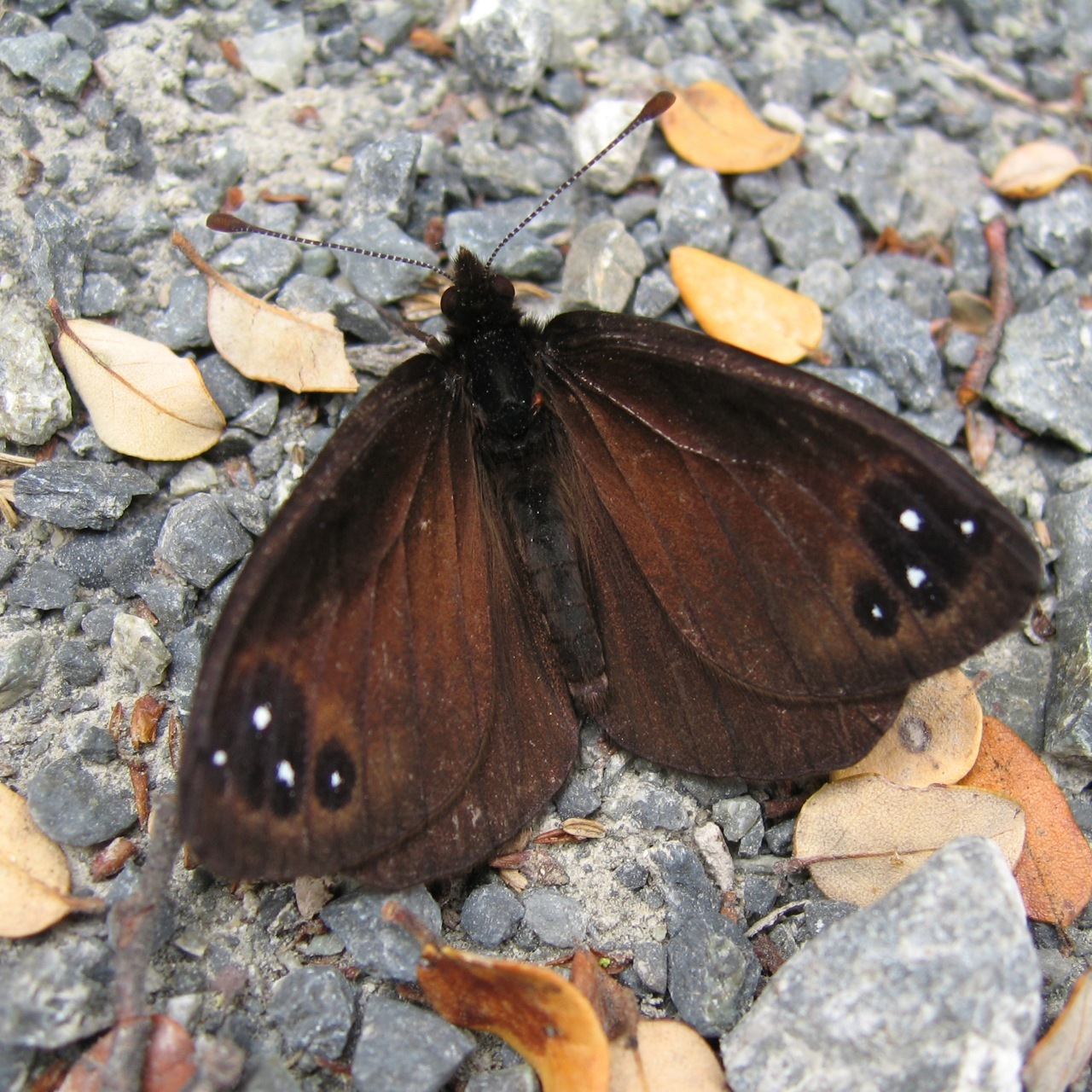
Percnodaimon merula basking in the sun

Wing colour plays an important physiological role: the dark wings with a large surface area absorb sunlight and store heat, essentially acting like solar panels, an adaptation to the cool climate of the Southern Alps. The butterfly sits with its wings open and turned towards the sun, flying while the sun is shining and hiding amongst rocks when clouds intervene. At night they shelter deep in rocky crevices.

== Distribution ==
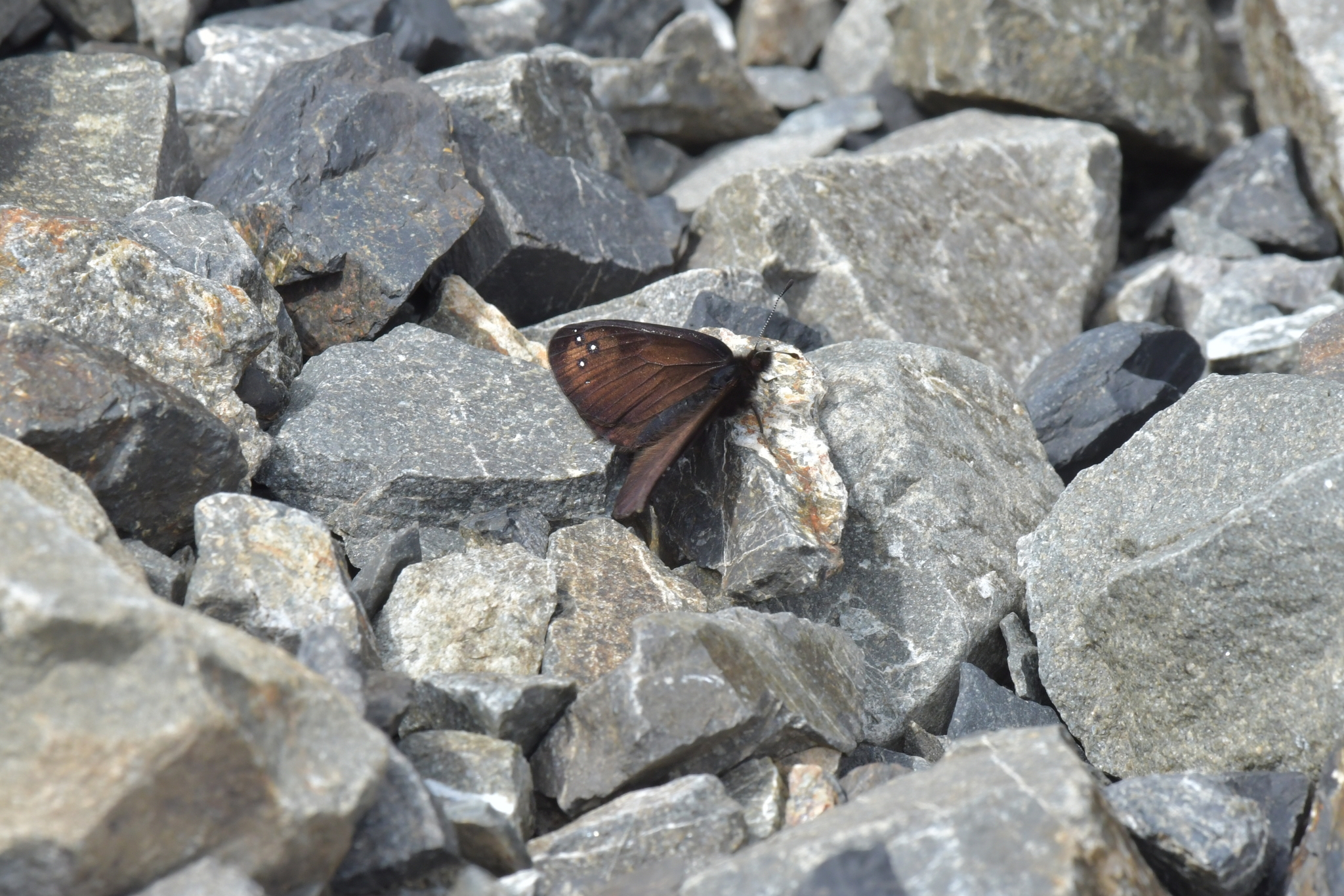
In its usual habitat of scree slopes

The genus Percnodaimon is restricted to the dry eastern mountains in the South Island of New Zealand, on greywacke scree slopes and amongst rockfalls. It occurs at altitudes ranging from 800 to 2500 metres, up to 3100 m in the northern mountains of the South Island. Although the butterfly is less common below 1200 m, it can be found down to 800 m on valley floors and passes if the scree habitat is present. It can be quite common and even seasonally abundant in suitable habitat.

== Life cycle ==
=== Ovum ===
The adult female black mountain ringlet deposits her eggs atop stones on alpine slopes, rather than on a larval food plant. When the sun is out it heats the stone's exposed surface, incubating the eggs. This behaviour is unique among New Zealand butterflies and is only seen in a handful of butterfly species occupying the Himalayas and European Alps.

The eggs are initially blue, eventually turning speckled and brown, which allows them to blend in with the stony background. About two days before hatching this colouration is lost and the brown head of the larvae becomes visible. The hatching process takes around 12 days, or longer if the eggs are at higher altitudes. To sustain itself the newly-hatched larva consumes its egg casings, which have sufficient nutrients for early larval stages.

=== Larvae ===
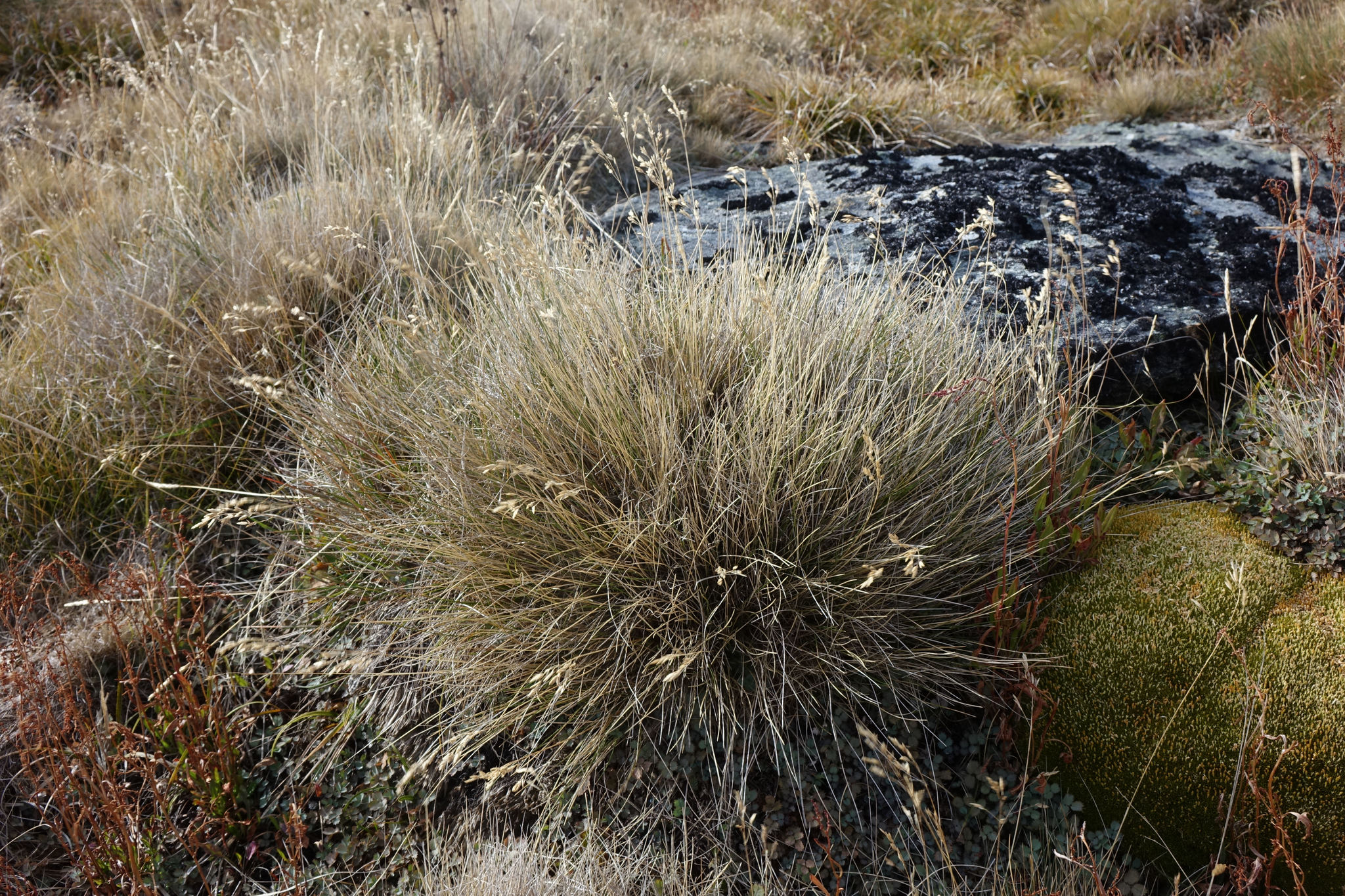
Blue tussock (Poa colensoi)

Percnodaimon larvae vary from dull grey to brown and have black anterior setae. The larvae have five instars, each of which take about a month in pleasant summer temperatures, but up to eight months over winter. For this reason the butterfly can stay in its larval stage for up to two years, and can be found almost year-round in an instar stage.

The alpine grasses Poa colensoi, P. buchananii, and other Poa species are the larval food plant. These tussocks are common throughout the Southern Alps, but larvae are present only where the grass grows adjacent to rocky areas. Black mountain ringlet larvae are night feeders to avoid predators, which can easily spot them feeding on the tips of tussock blades. They spend little time feeding, but instead conceal themselves in nearby hiding spots.

=== Pupa ===
At the start of pupation the black mountain ringlet turns grey with brown speckles to match the surrounding stones. Unlike most butterflies pupae are suspended horizontally rather than vertically, and are attached to the undersurface of a rock with a large cremaster, a hook-shaped protuberance on the abdomen. Pupae have been found up to 3 feet away from the nearest food plant. The adult butterflies emerge 2 to 3 weeks later.

=== Imago ===
Adult black mountain ringlets are found in summer, from December to February, and the Patricks note that early versus late emergence is one of the characteristics distinguishing the undescribed species. This species is considered to live about a year in its adult stage, but as the larvae can take two or three summers to grow to full size there is a possibility that it can live up to four. This slow growth may reflect the extreme climate and conditions of New Zealand's Southern Alps.

== See also ==
- Butterflies of New Zealand
