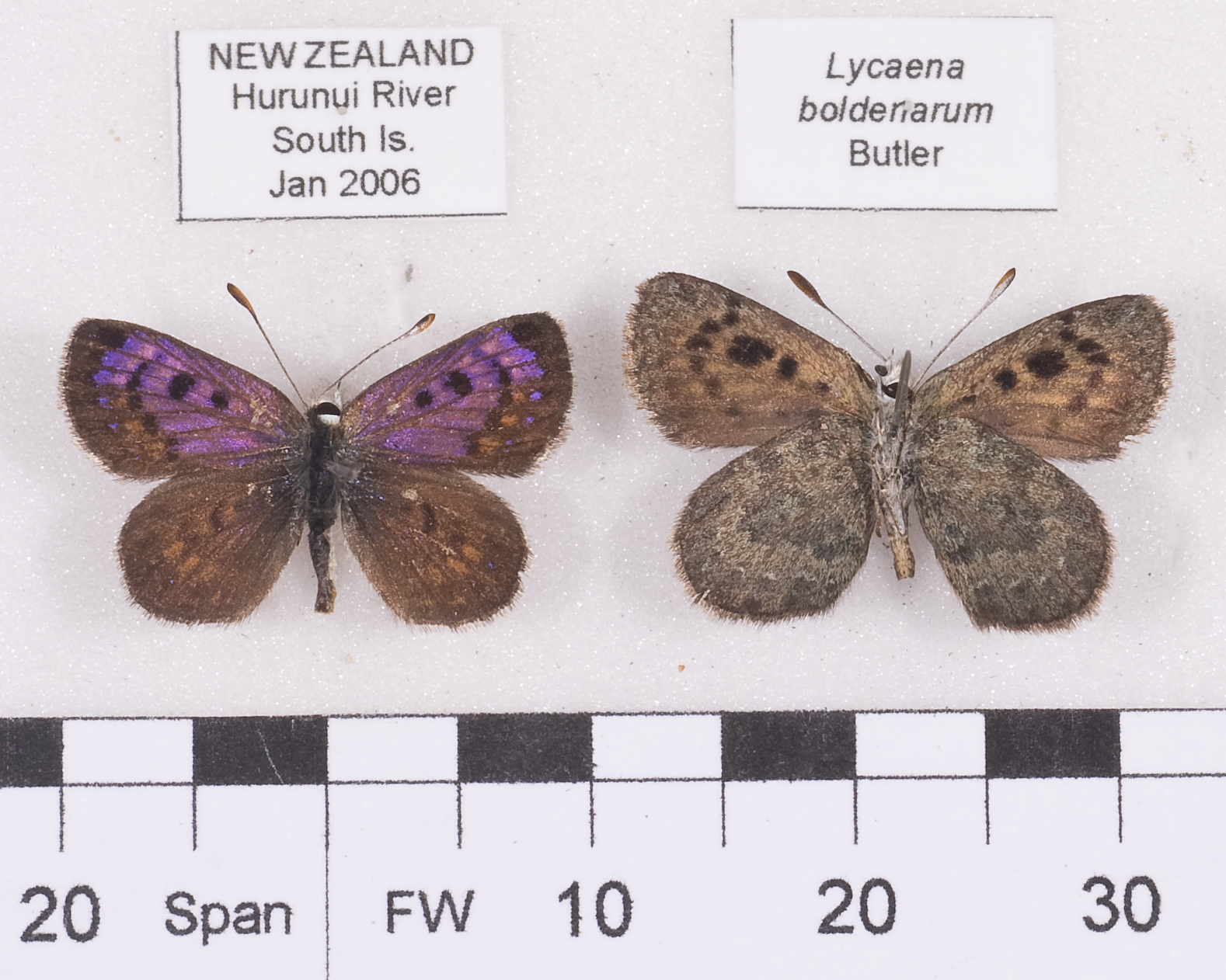

Scientific classification
- Domain: Eukaryota
- Kingdom: Animalia
- Phylum: Arthropoda
- Class: Insecta
- Order: Lepidoptera
- Family: Lycaenidae
- Genus: Lycaena
- Species: L. boldenarum

Binomial name
- Lycaena boldenarum (White, 1862)

Synonyms
- Boldenaria boldenarum (White, 1862); Chrysophanus boldenarum caerulea Salmon, 1946; Chrysophanus boldenarum ianthina Salmon, 1946

= Lycaena boldenarum =

Species of butterfly

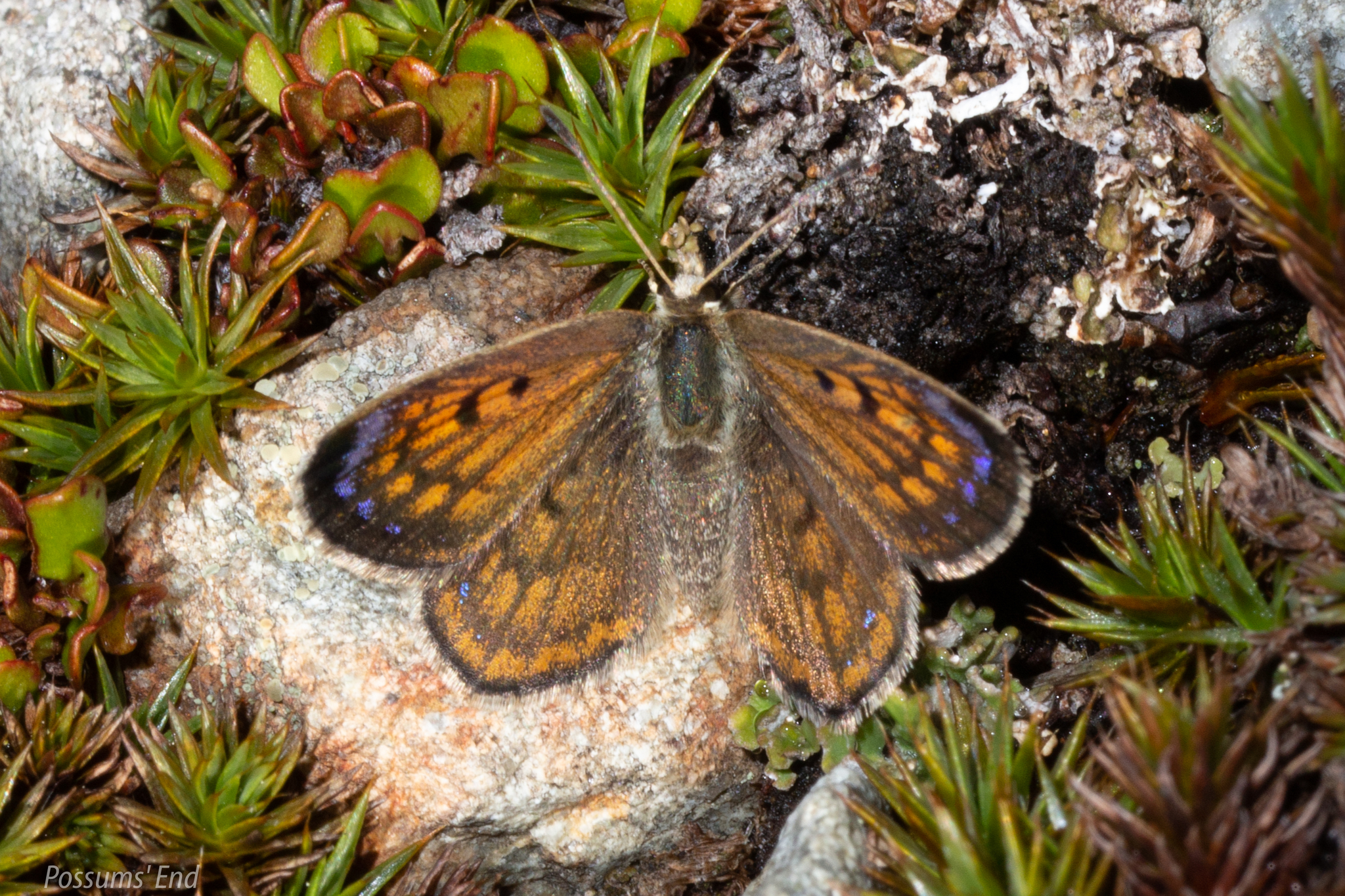
Lycaena boldenarum, boulder copper

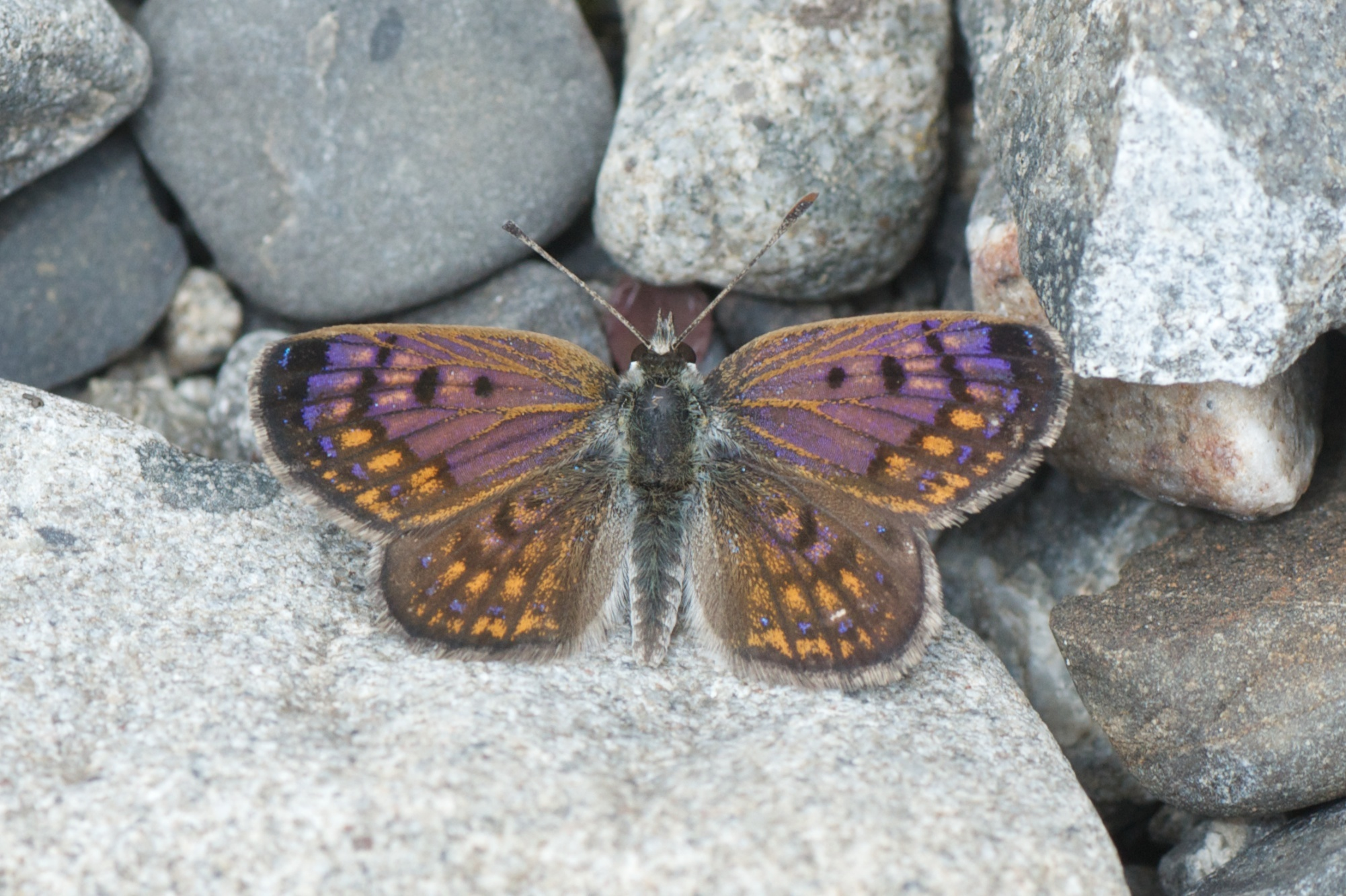
Lycaena boldenarum, boulder copper

Lycaena boldenarum, the boulder copper, is a species of butterfly which is endemic to New Zealand, it is found on both North Island and South Island in a wide variety of open habitats including grassland, shingle and sand dunes. They are normally only active in bright sunny conditions and their flight is usually low to the ground. The boldenarum part of the species name given by the Scottish entomologist Adam White in honour of his first wife, Helen and her sister Frances, whose maiden name was Bolden. It shares the Maori name pepe para riki with two congeners the common copper (Lycaena salustius) and the glade copper (Lycaena feredayi).

== Description ==
The wingspan is 17–27 mm and this is the second smallest species of butterfly found in New Zealand, the southern blue (Zizina otis oxleyi) being the smallest. The underside of the hindwings of Lycaena boldenarum vary in their markings, with some being pale and faintly patterned while others may be boldly marked with blackish marbling on a grey background. In the males the upperwings have a purple sheen but the females show a more usual pattern for Lycaena butterflies.

== Distribution ==
Endemic to New Zealand, it is widespread on the South Island but on the North Island it is restricted to the Wairarapa, Central Plateau and Hawkes Bay areas.

== Habitat ==
Lycaena boldenarum is found in a wide variety of open habitats including grassland, shingle, sand dunes and braided rivers. Its common name does not refer to boulders but is derived from the scientific name which refers to Helen Bolden, the maiden name of the first wife of Adam White the naturalist who named this species, and that of her sister, Frances.

== Biology ==
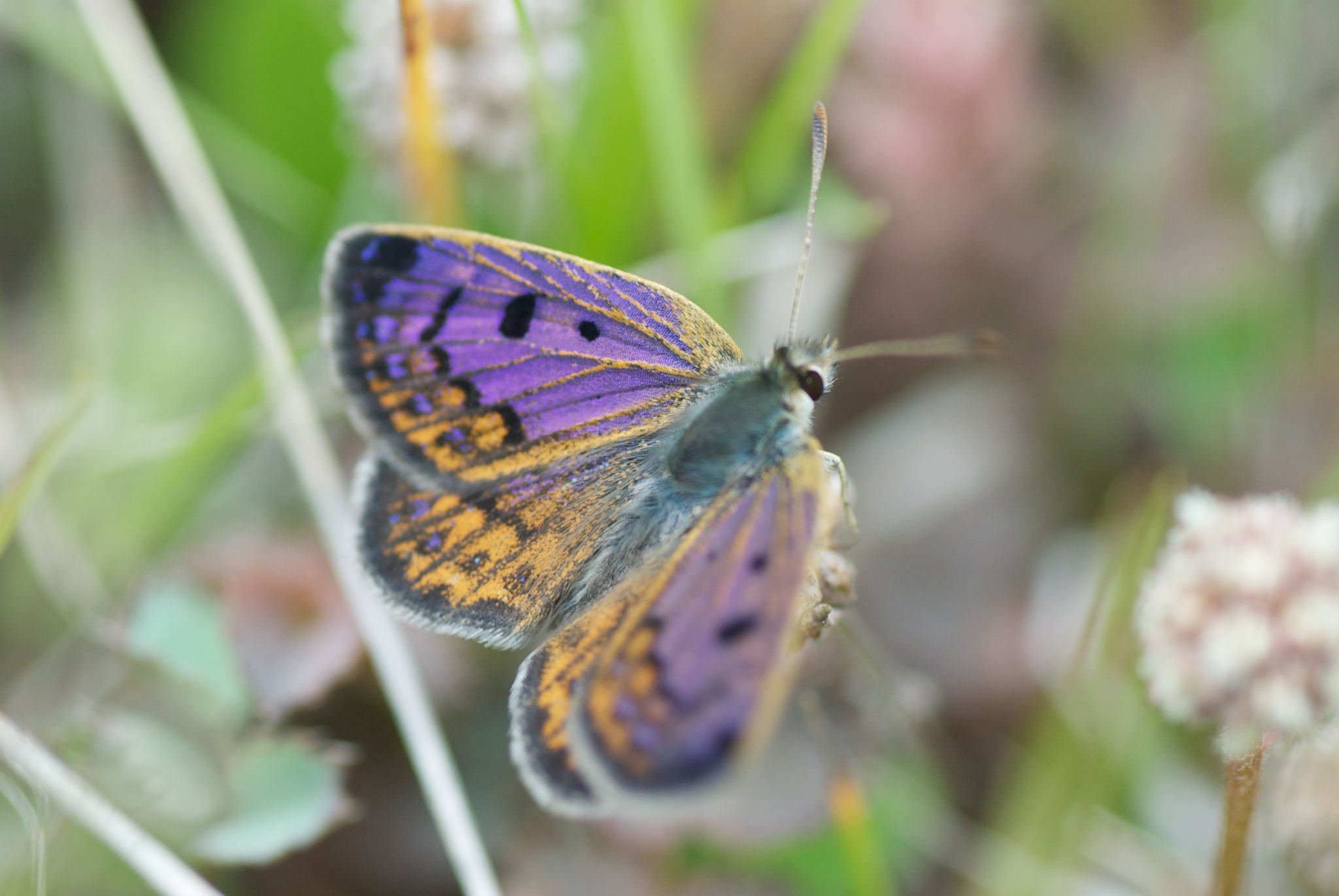
Boulder Copper (Lycaena boldenarum)

The larvae feed on Muehlenbeckia axillaris but Rumex flexousus has also been recorded as a food plant, and it is possible that other Muehlenbeckia species are also used. The single egg is laid either on a stem or on the underside of leaves. The caterpillar varies in colour and may be olive green, yellowish green, pink or reddish brown, but there is always a diamond-shaped mark on the prothorax. It overwinters when half grown and in the spring it resumes feeding, hiding beneath small stones when inactive. The larvae are often found in association with Monomorium ants but a symbiotic link or dependency has not been demonstrated. The pupae are either light brown or reddish, but both forms show an abdomen speckled with black. The pupa is secured to a dead leaf on the ground by a cremaster and a few loose strands of silk.

== Subspecies ==
- Lycaena boldenarum boldenarum
- Lycaena boldenarum caerulea (Salmon, 1946)
- Lycaena boldenarum ianthina (Salmon, 1946)

== Conservation status of Lycaena boldenarum ianthina ==
Hoare et al. classified Lycaena ianthina as being Nationally Critical under the New Zealand Threat Classification system.

== See also ==
- Butterflies of New Zealand
