= List of butterflies of New Zealand =

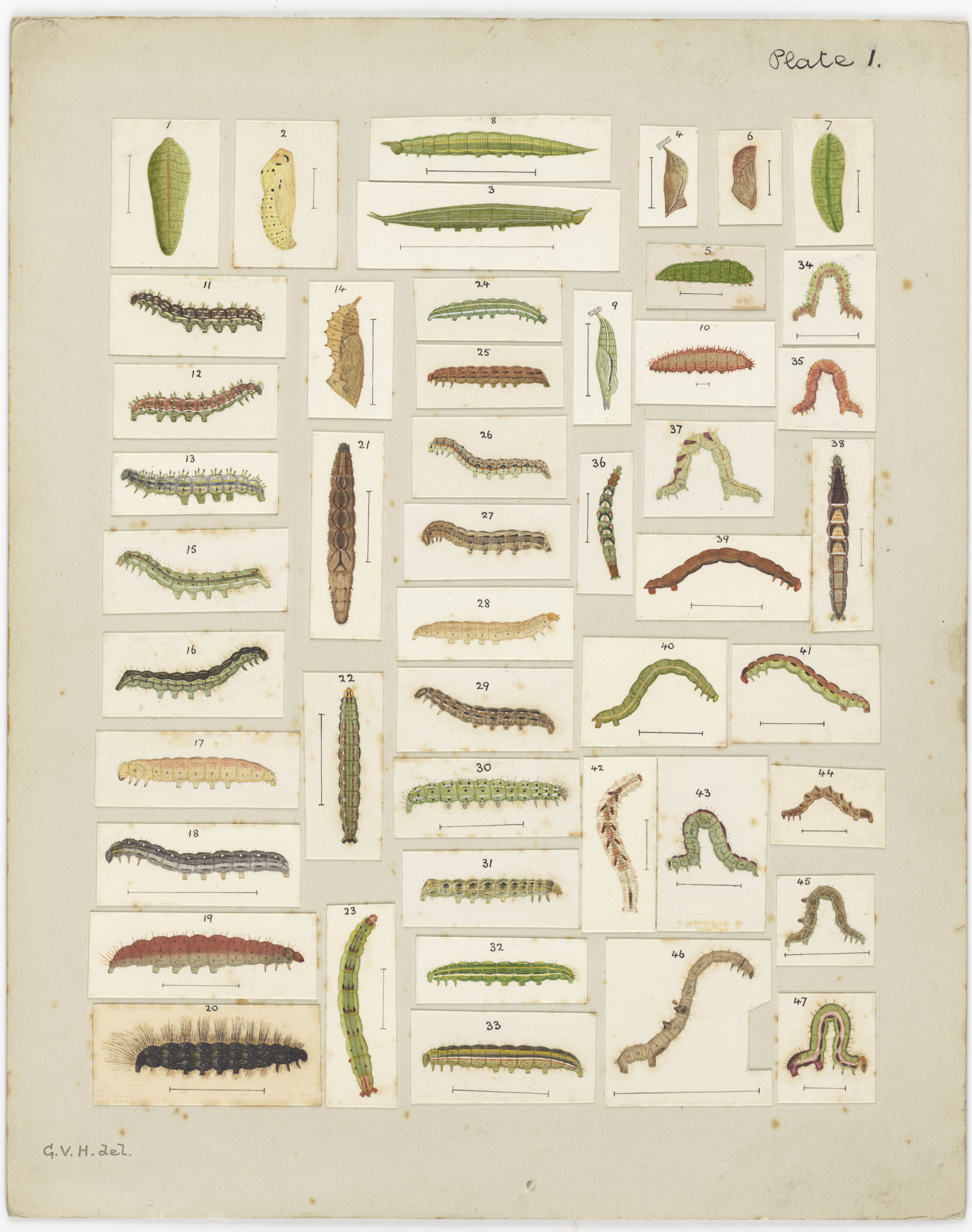
Caterpillars of several butterflies and moths of New Zealand

The butterflies of New Zealand include twelve endemic species, as well as several introduced and migrant species. Lepidoptera, which includes the butterflies and moths, is the third largest insect order in New Zealand.

== Species list ==
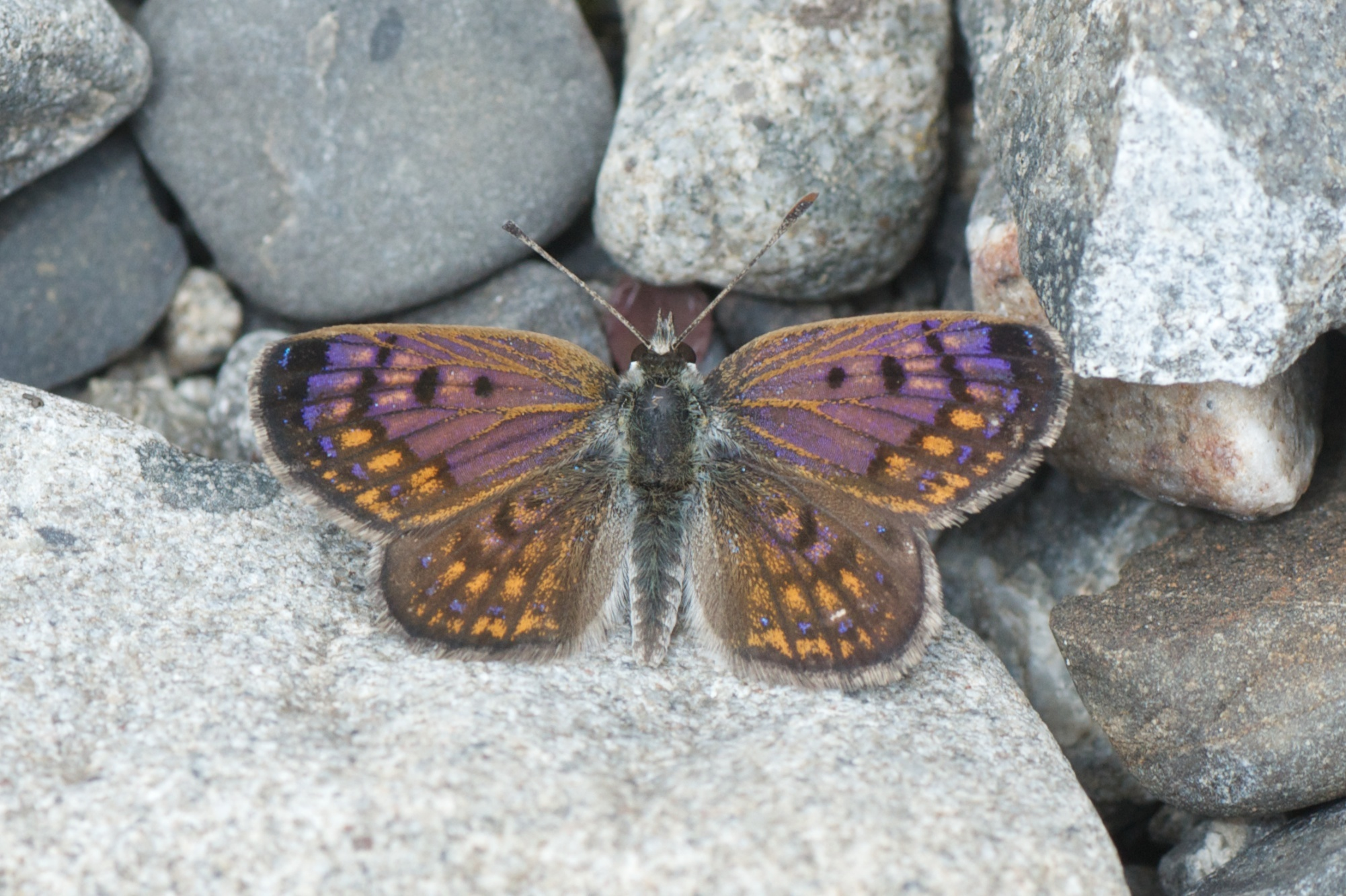
Boulder copper (Lycaena boldenarum)

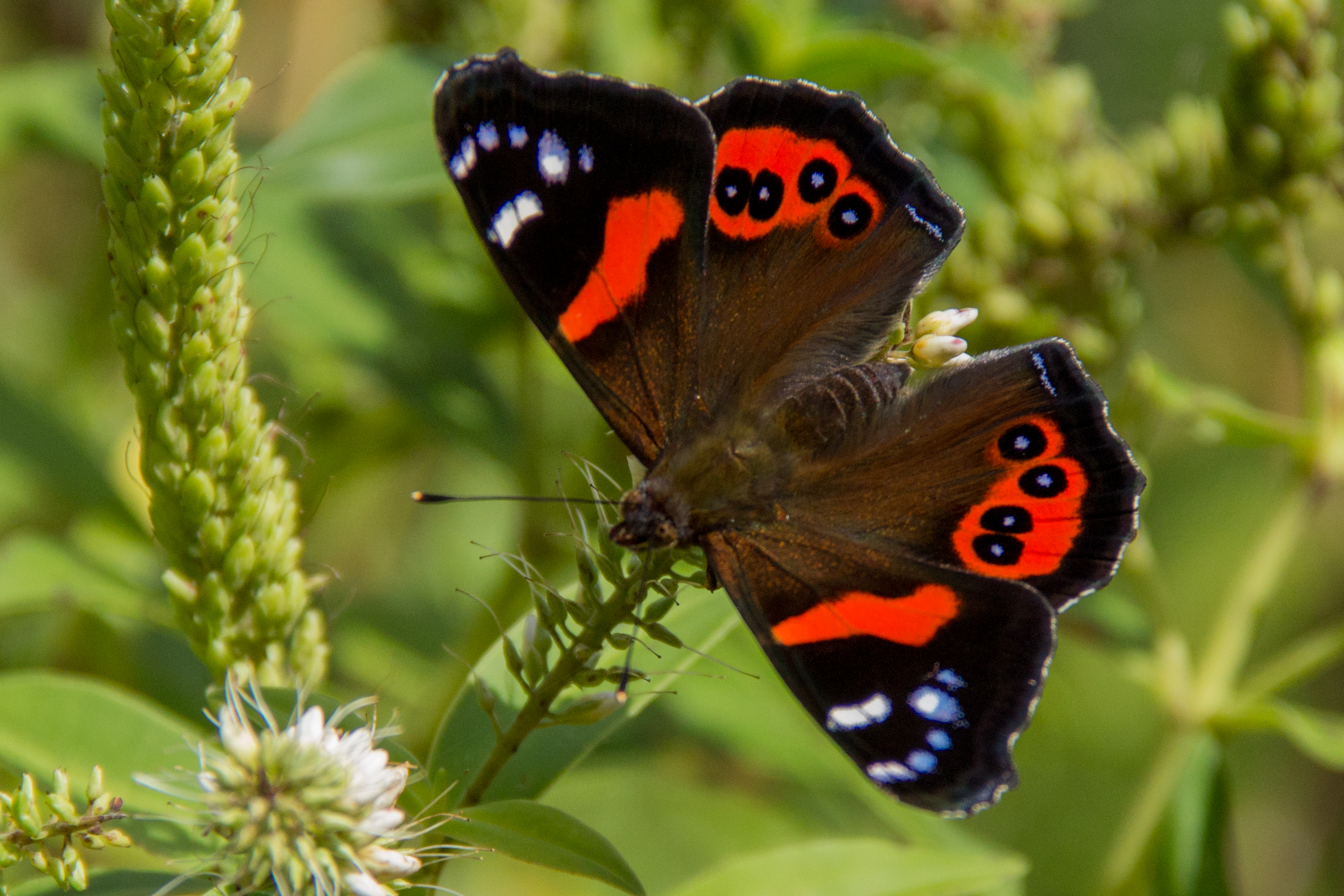
Red admiral (Vanessa gonerilla)

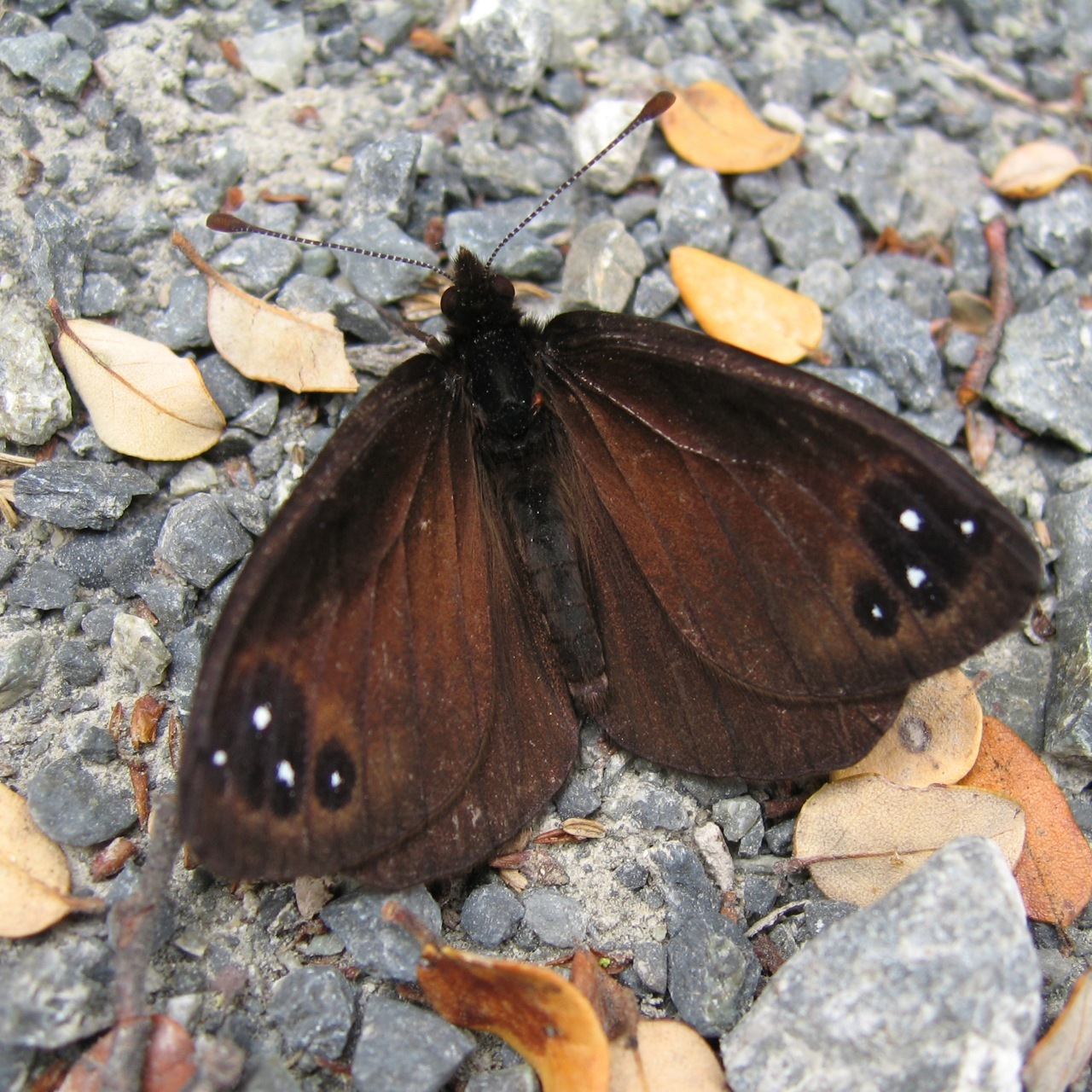
Black mountain ringlet (Percnodaimon merula)

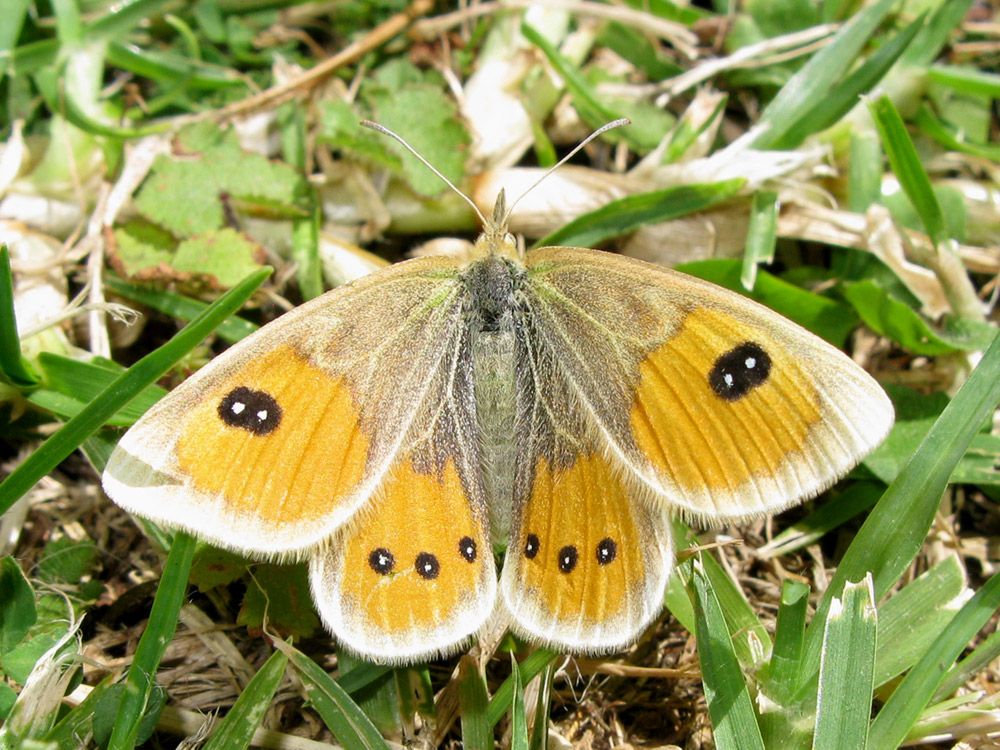
Common tussock (Argyrophenga antipodum)

Scientific name	Local English name	Māori name	Native/introduced/migrant	Conservation status
Catopsilia pomona (Fabricius, 1775)	lemon emigrant		very rare migrant	
Pieris rapae (Linnaeus, 1758)	white butterfly	pepe mā	introduced	
Lycaena boldenarum White, 1862	boulder copper	pepe para riki	native, endemic	
Lycaena salustius (Fabricius, 1793)	common copper	pepe para riki	native, endemic	
Lycaena feredayi (Bates, 1867)	glade copper	pepe para riki	native, endemic	
Lycaena rauparaha (Fereday, 1877)	Rauparaha's copper	mokarakare	native, endemic	
Lampides boeticus (Linnaeus, 1767)	long-tailed blue		native (self-introduced)	
Zizina otis labradus (Godart, 1824)	common blue	pepe ao uri	native or possibly introduced	
Zizina oxleyi (C. & R. Felder, 1865)	southern blue		native, endemic	
Tirumala hamata hamata (MacLeay, 1826)	Australian blue tiger		very rare migrant	
Danaus plexippus (Linnaeus, 1758)	monarch	kahuku	native (self-introduced)	
Danaus petilia (Stoll, 1790)	lesser wanderer		rare migrant	
Junonia villida calybe Godart, 1819	Australian meadow argus		very rare migrant	
Hypolimnas bolina nerina (Fabricius, 1775)	blue moon		regular migrant	
Vanessa itea (Fabricius, 1775)	yellow admiral	kahu kōwhai	native	
Vanessa gonerilla gonerilla (Fabricius, 1775)	[New Zealand] red admiral	kahu kura	native, endemic	
Vanessa gonerilla ida (Alfken, 1899)	Chatham Island red admiral	kahu kura	native, endemic	
Vanessa kershawi (McCoy, 1868)	Australian painted lady	pepe parahua	regular migrant	
Melanitis leda bankia (Fabricius, 1775)	evening brown		very rare migrant	
Percnodaimon merula (Hewitson, 1875)	black mountain ringlet	pepe pouri	native, endemic	
Erebiola butleri Fereday, 1879	Butler's ringlet	pepe pouri	native, endemic	
Dodonidia helmsii Butler, 1884	forest ringlet	pepe pouri te pēpepe pōuri	native, endemic	serious decline
Argyrophenga antipodum Doubleday, 1845	common tussock		native, endemic	
Argyrophenga harrisi Craw, 1978	Harris's tussock		native, endemic	
Argyrophenga janitae Craw, 1978	Janita's tussock		native, endemic	

== Conservation ==
Very little is known about any butterfly extinctions since human settlement of New Zealand since they leave few remains. The majority of New Zealand invertebrates are found in forests, so it is possible that some butterflies became extinct due to the large scale forest clearance after human settlement.

== Very occasional migrants ==
Apart from the rare but consistent sightings of Australian migrant butterflies, several other species have also been recorded on the island over the years.

Species	Location(s)	Date	Method of introduction
Small tortoiseshell (Aglais urticae)	Lincoln, Canterbury	13 August 2019	Unknown
Blue triangle (Graphium choredon)	Prebbleton, Canterbury	15 March 2017	Unknown/wind current
Asian swallowtail (Papilio xuthus)	Dunedin, Auckland	1996, 2011, 2016	Importation of citrus trees, importation of cars
Black Jezebel (Delias nigrina)	Waikaia, Southland	January 2010	Unknown/wind current
Common Mormon (Papilio polytes)	Westshore, Hawkes Bay	22 January 2014	Likely importation of citrus/curry leaf plants

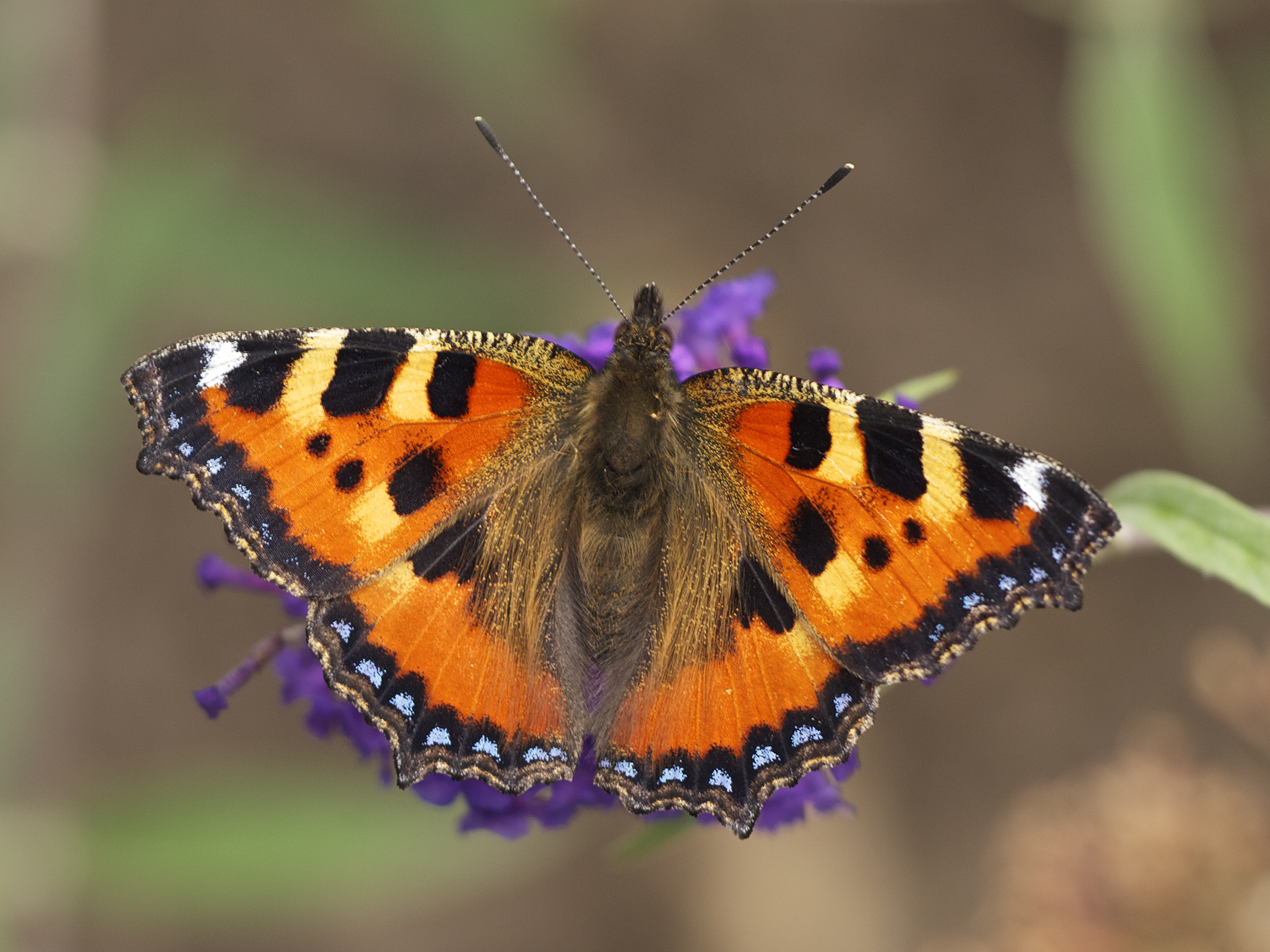
Small tortoiseshell, Aglais urticae

The small tortoiseshell (Aglais urticae), which is a butterfly native to Eurasia, was spotted near Lincoln University, Canterbury, on 13 August 2019, though the method of its introduction remains unknown.

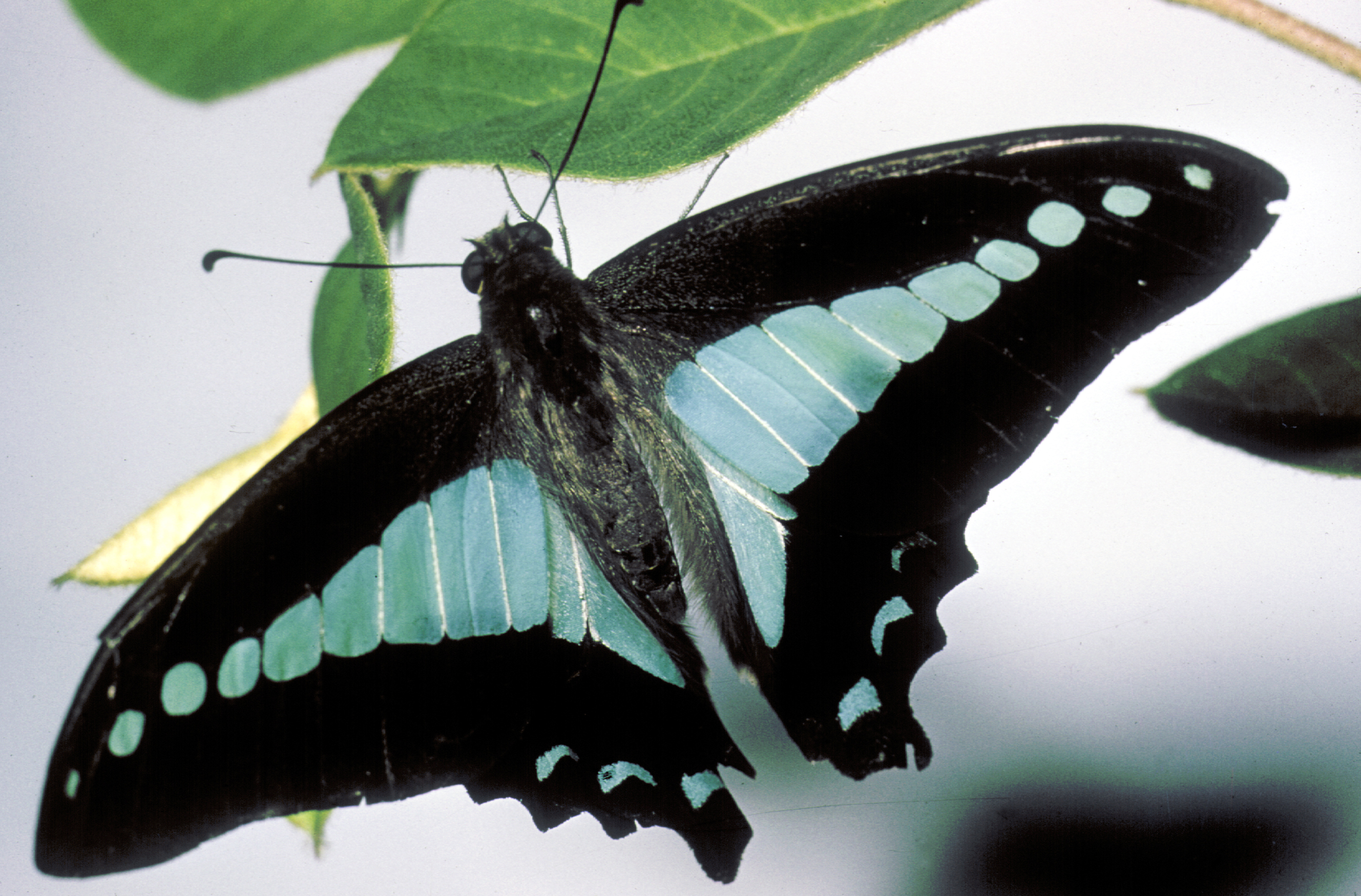
Blue triangle, Graphium choredon

The blue triangle (Graphium choredon), most likely from Australia, appeared in a Prebbleton garden feeding on aster flowers on 15 March 2017, likely carried by wind currents.

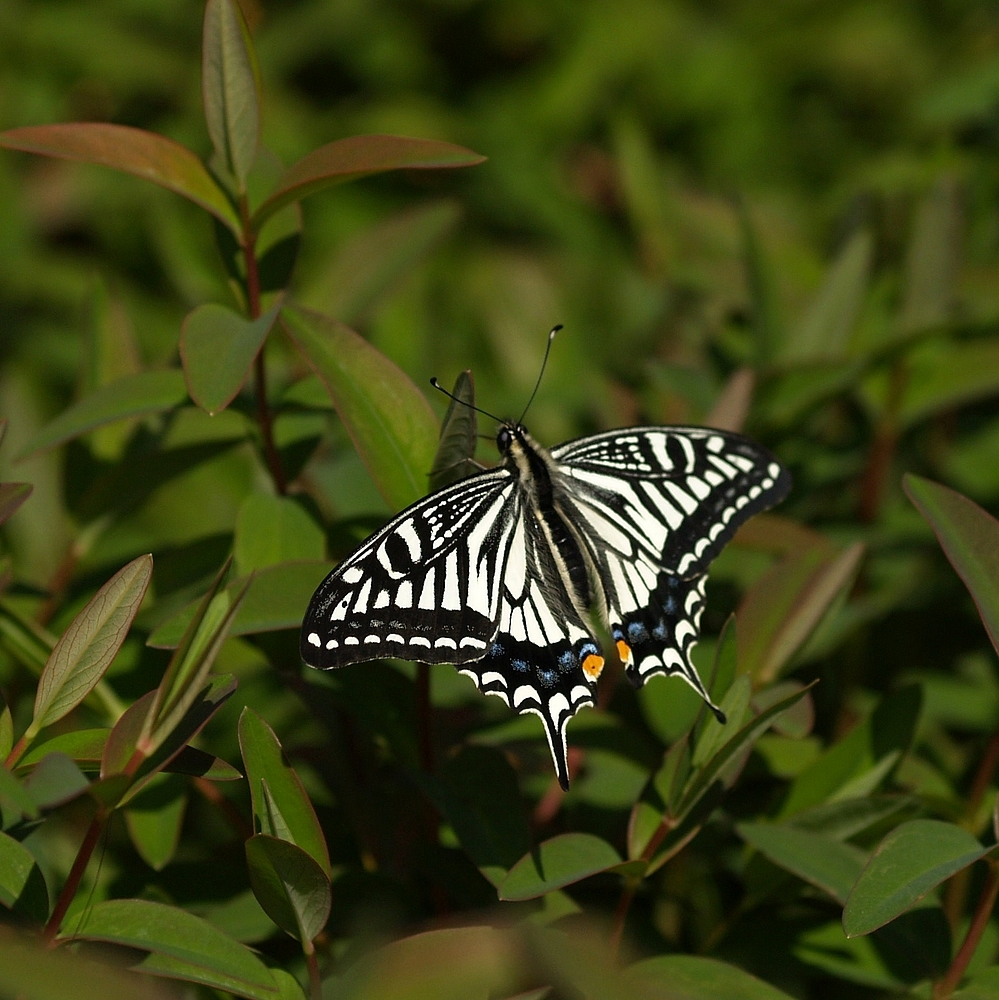
Asian swallowtail, Papilio xuthus

The Asian swallowtail (Papilio xuthus) has been recorded in Dunedin in 1996, when a pupa emerged on a car which had recently been imported from Japan. Two further sightings were made in Auckland in 2011 and 2016, likely from the importation of citrus trees.

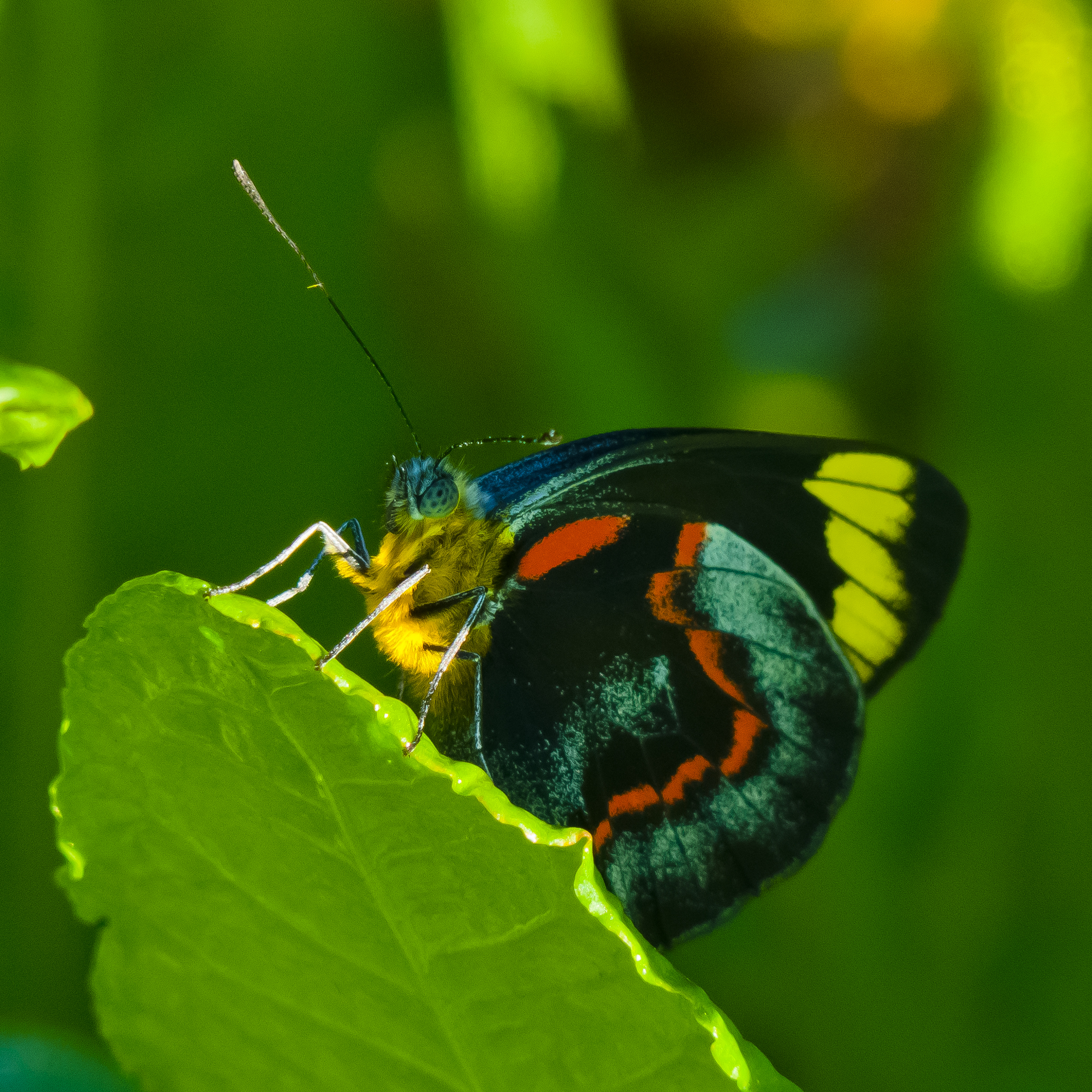
Black Jezebel, Delias nigrina

The black Jezebel (Delias nigrina) was seen in Waikaia, Southland, after it was rescued from a spider web in January 2010, with its arrival also attributed to wind currents or unknown factors.

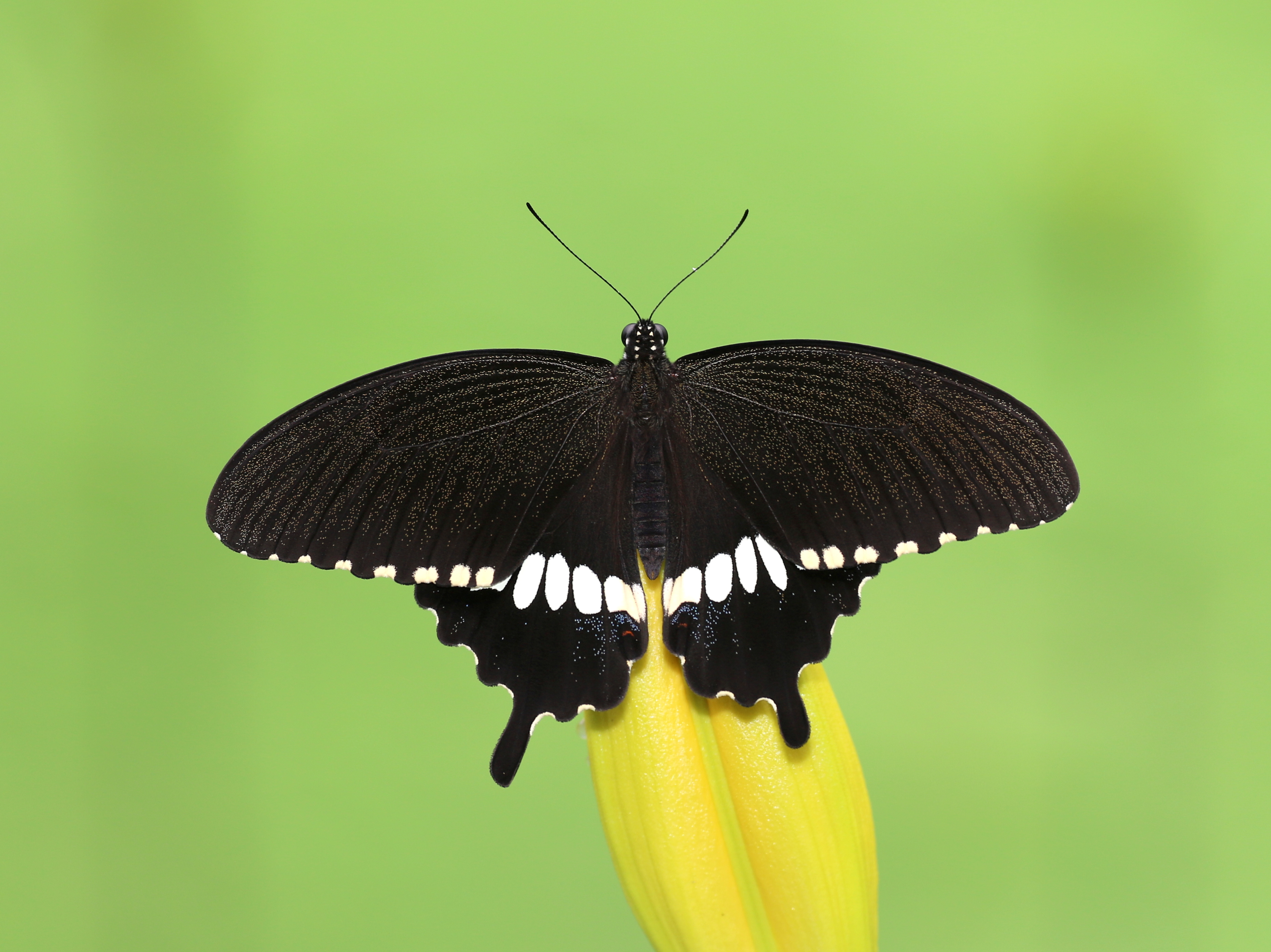
Common Mormon, Papilio polytes

The common Mormon (Papilio polytes) was seen in the Westshore suburb of Napier, Hawke's Bay on 22 January 2014. The specimen resembled subspecies from Malaysia and Hong Kong. It is attributed to shipping of citrus or curry leaf plants.

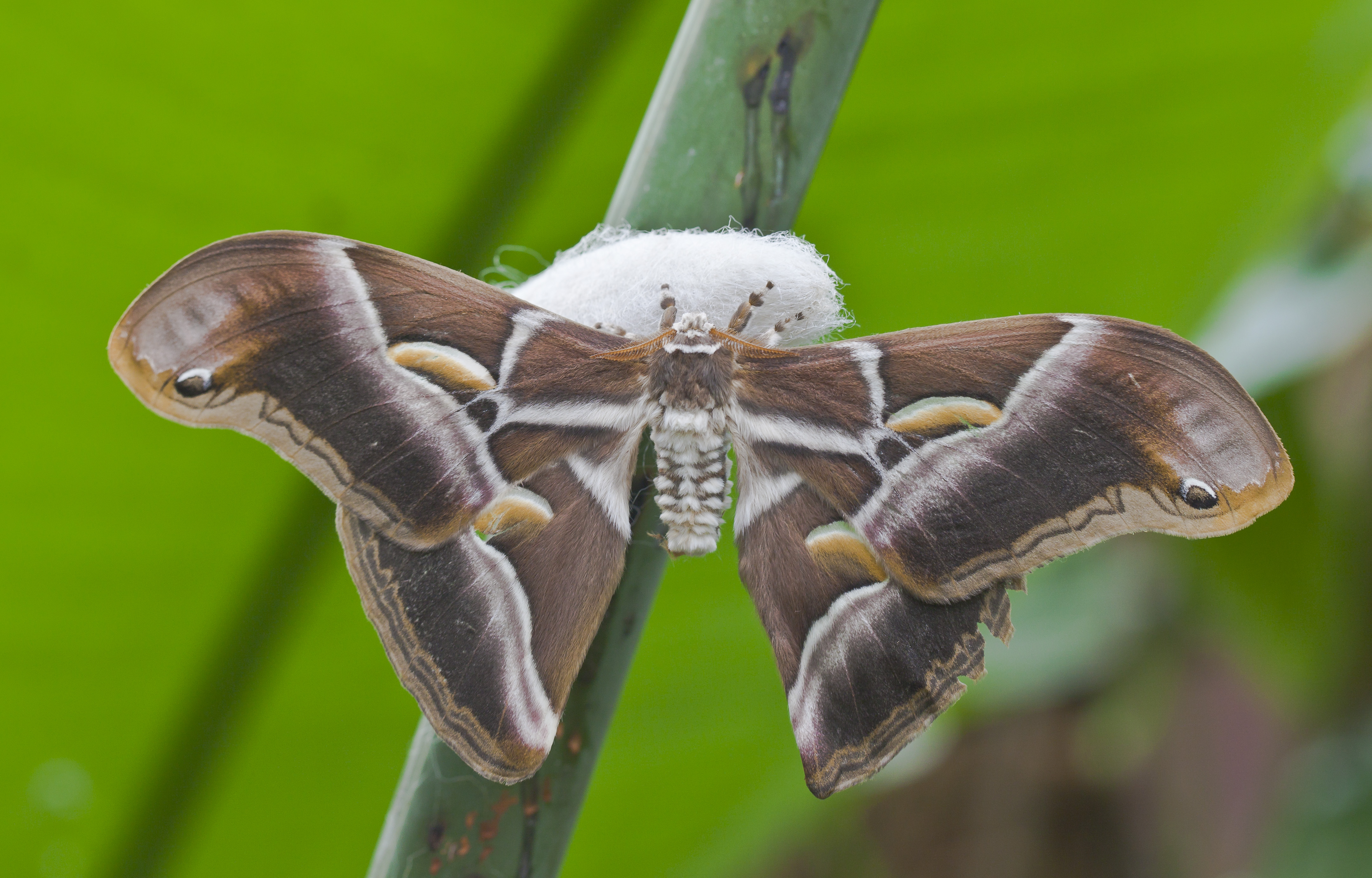
Samia cynthia has been spotted in Albert Park, Auckland.

Other species of Lepidoptera, such as saturniid moths have been sighted due to similar causes.

== See also ==
- List of Lepidoptera of New Zealand
- Fauna of New Zealand
- Environment of New Zealand
