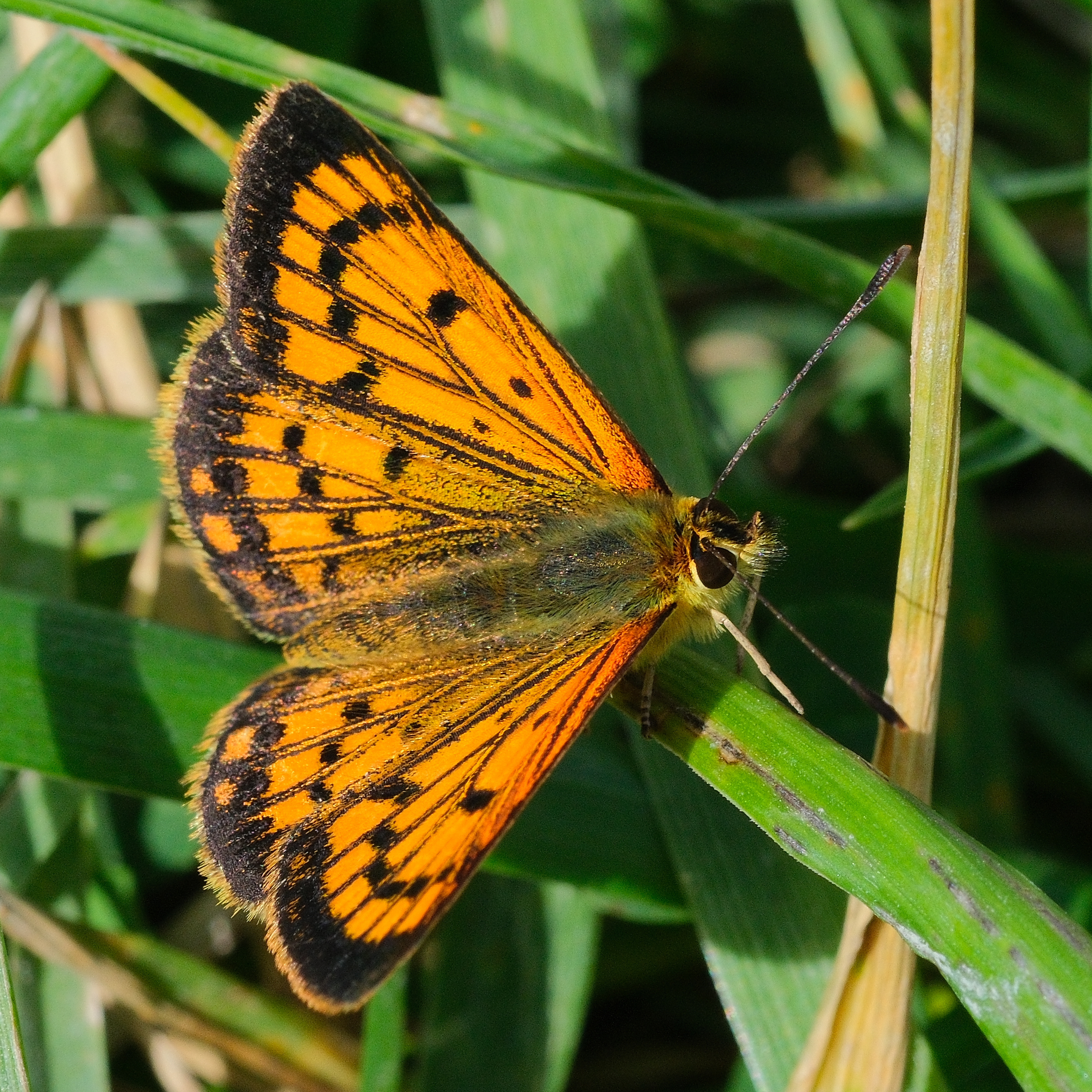

Scientific classification
- Domain: Eukaryota
- Kingdom: Animalia
- Phylum: Arthropoda
- Class: Insecta
- Order: Lepidoptera
- Family: Lycaenidae
- Genus: Lycaena
- Species: L. salustius

Binomial name
- Lycaena salustius (Fabricius, 1793)

Synonyms
- Hesperia salustius Fabricius, 1793

= Lycaena salustius =

Species of butterfly

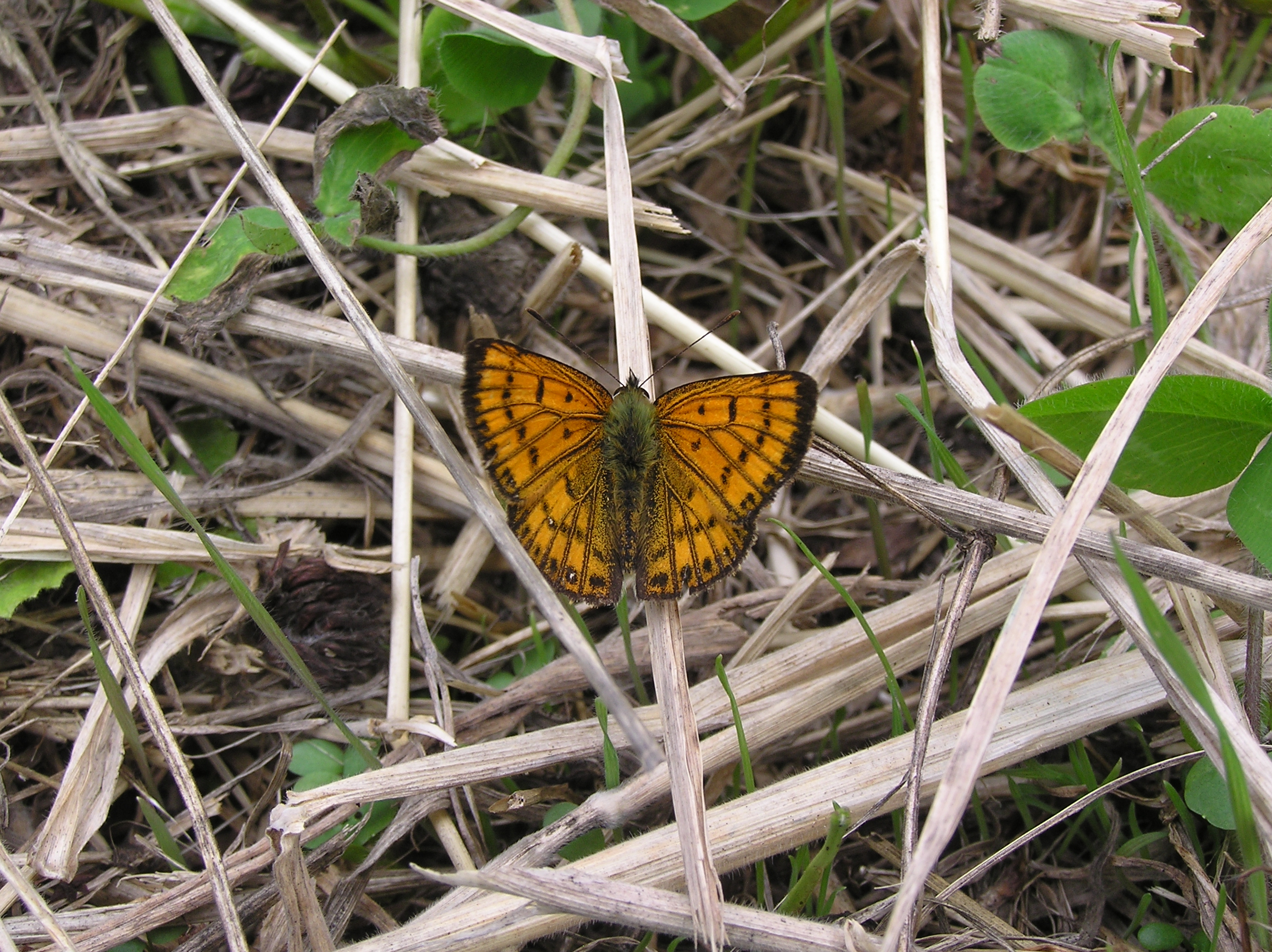
Male

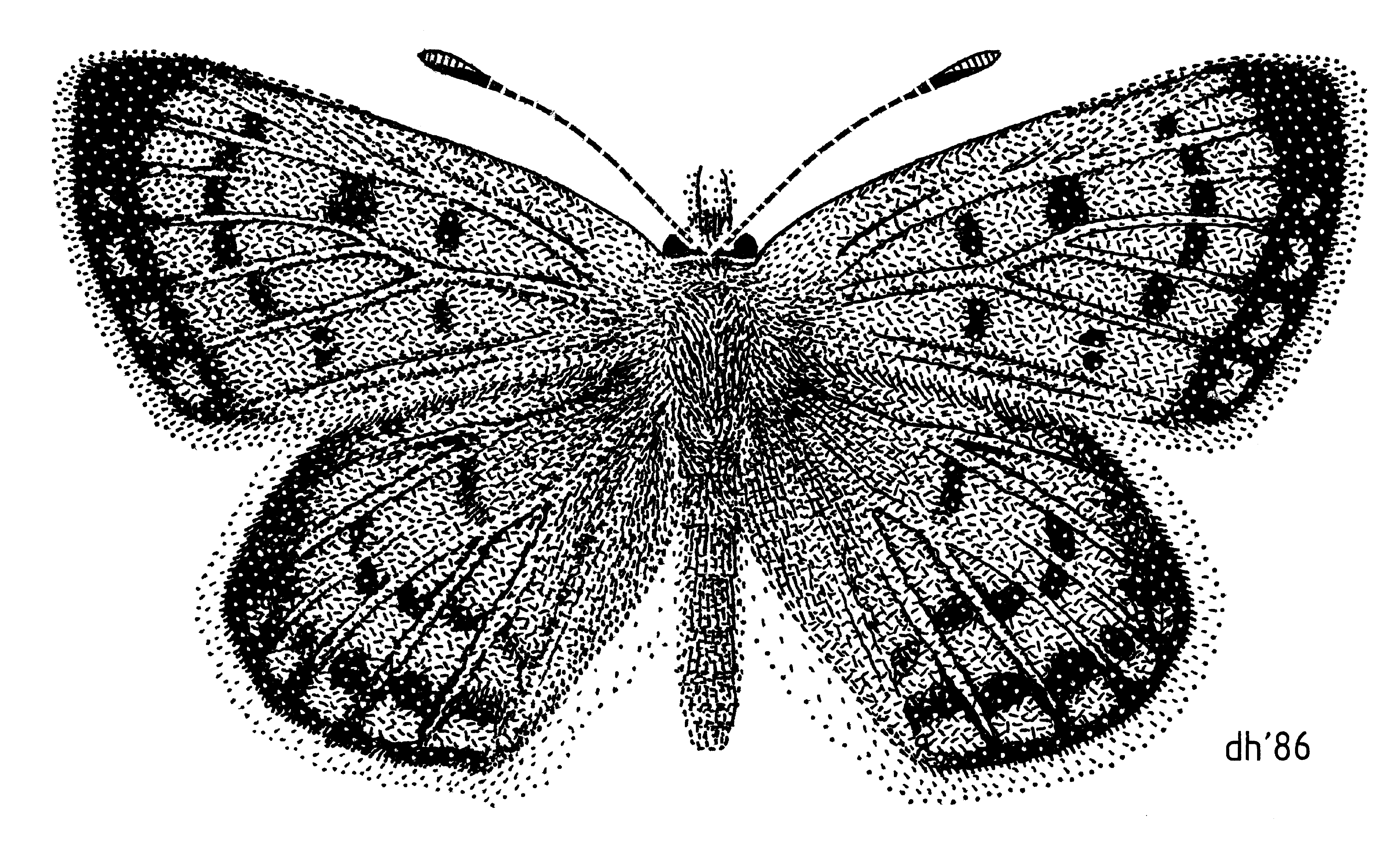
Lycaena salustius illustrated by Des Helmore

Lycaena salustius, the common copper or the coastal copper, is a butterfly of the family Lycaenidae. It is endemic to New Zealand. It is known in the Māori language as pepe para riki, a name that is shared with a few other members of the genus Lycaena native to New Zealand.

The wingspan is 24–35 mm. Adults are on wing from October to April.

The larvae feed on Muehlenbeckia species.

== See also ==
- Butterflies of New Zealand
