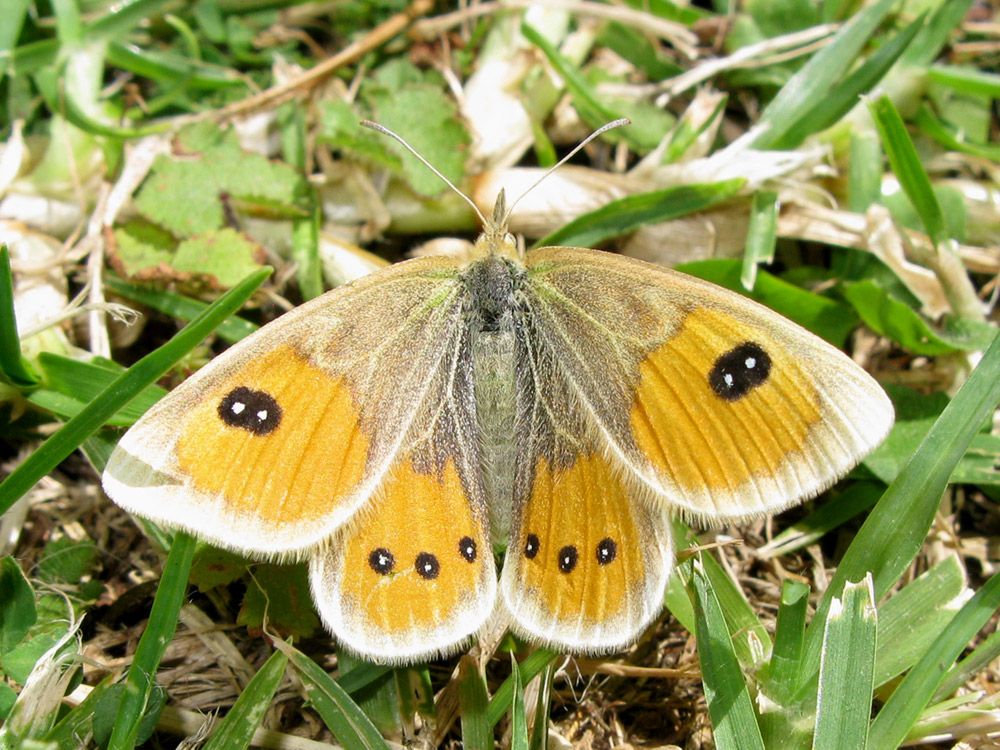

Scientific classification
- Domain: Eukaryota
- Kingdom: Animalia
- Phylum: Arthropoda
- Class: Insecta
- Order: Lepidoptera
- Family: Nymphalidae
- Genus: Argyrophenga
- Species: A. antipodum

Binomial name
- Argyrophenga antipodum Doubleday, 1845

= Argyrophenga antipodum =

Species of butterfly

Argyrophenga antipodum, the common tussock or tussock ringlet, is a species of butterfly commonly found in the South Island of New Zealand.

== Description ==
Argyrophenga antipodum is approximately 12–17 mm long with a wingspan of about 35–45 mm. Male and female common tussock butterflies are quite different in body shape, as females are shorter and have more rounded bodies compared to the males. Common tussock butterflies have very distinct markings on the underside of their wings; they are described as silver streaks and give the butterflies an advantage when it comes to camouflage. The butterfly itself is brown and red, with distinctive eyespots, this is believed to be an evolutionary adaptation to prevent prey from attacking. The sexes are coloured differently with the males being darker in colour and having more red and brown on them and the females are more of a yellow colour, but have very similar patterns or markings on their topside and underside.

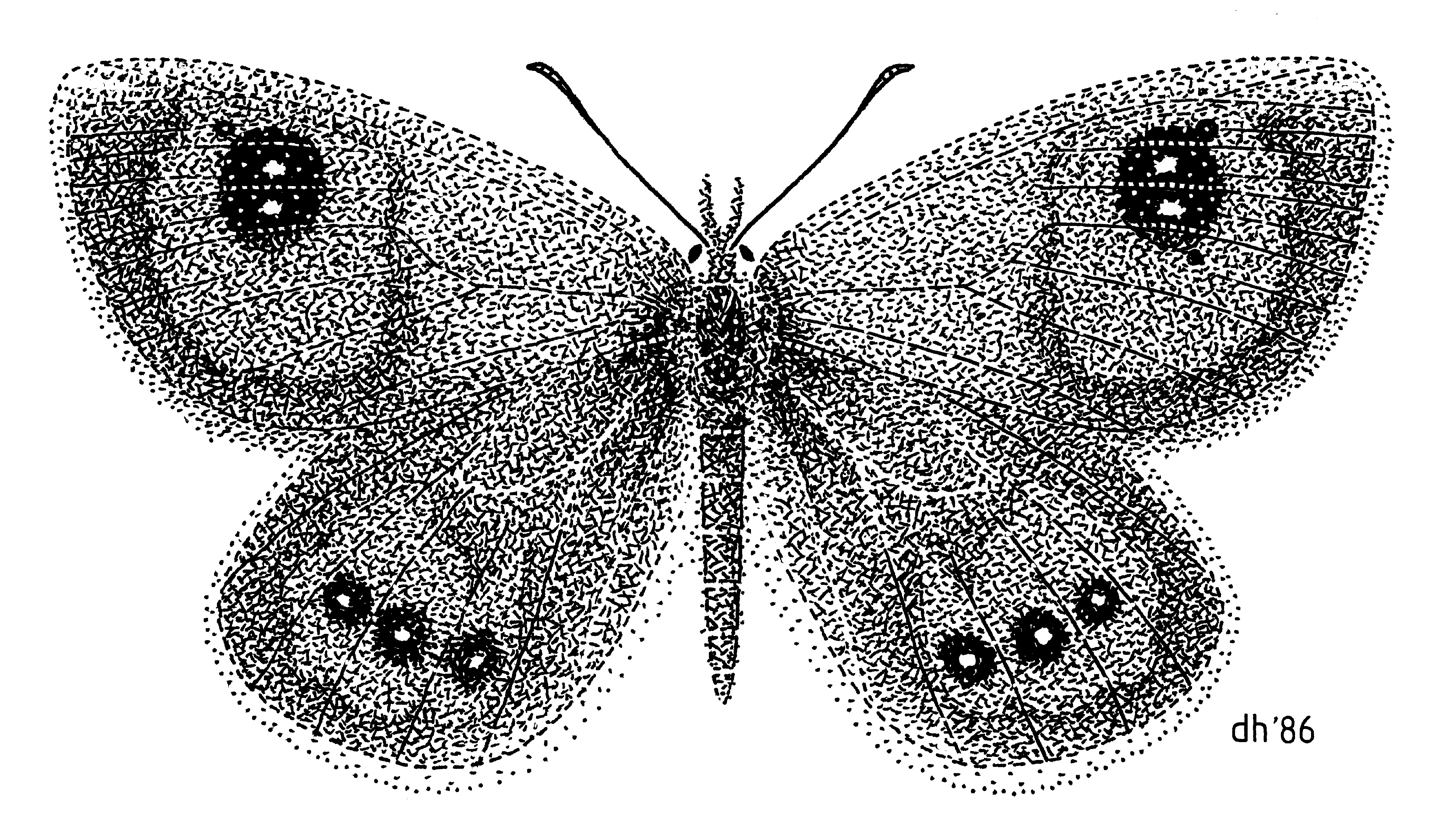
Argyrophenga antipodum illustrated by Des Helmore

== Distribution ==
=== Natural global range ===
The common tussock butterfly is endemic to New Zealand. It can be found in the eastern, southern and central regions of New Zealand's South Island, most abundantly in lowland Canterbury, Otago and Southland. Studies have noted A. antipodum's apparent absence from all other areas of New Zealand despite suitable habitat being available.

=== Habitat preferences ===
The common tussock can be found in a variety of habitats ranging from sea-level saltmarshes and grasslands, to an alpine zone as high as 1950 metres. A. antipodum can be abundant in native and introduced grasslands, both tall and short, as well as various open-country, semi-natural sceneries in New Zealand's South Island. The common tussock is readily seen roadside along old forest sites, and within ungrazed grassland habitats. Furthermore, at sea level, A. antipodum was identified along the Southland coast in mosaic habitats which included areas such as salt marsh, swamp, and tussock grassland.

== Life cycle ==
A new generation of common tussocks is hatched annually, with adult butterflies able to be found from late October to late March.

At the larval stage, common tussock caterpillars are able to camouflage themselves amongst various tall and short grasses which serve as the host plants. This ability to camouflage against host plants continues when A. antipodum develop into pupae, or reach the chrysalis stage of development.

A. antipodum adults are sexually dimorphic and distinctive in behaviour. Male common tussocks are known to fly fast and more frequently, whilst the females are smaller spend more time amongst flowers and grass to lay their eggs.

The flight period of common tussock butterflies extends from November to March, as evidenced in a study of Argyrophenga in central Otago, which revealed an abundance of A. antipodum in various grassland host plants present from late November to late February. It has also been noted that the common tussock's ability to cover relatively large flight distances, an observation made when a marked male was recaptured one week later approximately 1 kilometre away from the location of original capture.

== Diet and foraging ==
Both male and female common tussocks are known to have a slow, lazy flight pattern which is relatively close to the ground, thus allowing for frequent feeding on various flowers and plants.

At the larval stage, A. antipodum rely on members of the family Poaceae as host plants. Known used genera include Poa, Festuca and Agropyron species. A. antipodum is known to specifically feed on plants such as Chionochloa rubra, meadow grass, Poa poiformis, snow tussock, and wood meadow-grass.

== Predators, parasites and diseases ==
Butterflies such as A. antipodum can be attacked by a number of insect parasites at the larvae and pupae stages of development, although at present there is not a lot of information published specifically on the common tussock's predators. It can be noted, however, that previous studies on the conservation status of various New Zealand butterflies, state that most species considered at risk are not only found in the Canterbury area, but often inhabit areas of short-tussock grasslands much like A. antipodum. Such areas are said to be commonly planted on easily developed land, therefore rendering the area as difficult to protect and maintain in the presence of herbivores and weedy plant species which could possibly take over the intended plant species. Although not a direct predatory threat, this vulnerability of one of the common tussock's host plants suggests an indirect threat to A. antipodum's survival. The same study also suggests that the result of majority of high risk butterfly species being found in New Zealand's South Island could also be due to the higher abundance and diversity of fauna found in this part of the country. This again suggests another general, but very possible, threat to A. antipodum.

== Cultural uses ==
Butterflies are considered to be poorly represented in New Zealand, and thus those species that are present are considered to be culturally important for maintaining biodiversity. This would be particularly significant in the case of species such as the common tussock which are unable to be found elsewhere.

The native Māori have never used butterflies for anything culturally, however, butterflies are called pūrerehua, or commonly, pupa, which translates to "nod". This is due to the likeness to nodding that the pupa's abdomen has as it bends back and forth during flight. Pupae were sometimes used in a children's game where the children would ask their grandparents if they could hold the pupa. They would do so between their thumb and forefinger then ask questions such as, "am I a good girl?" and if the pupa bent its abdomen up then it would mean "yes", and if it bent its abdomen down it would mean "no".

== Interesting facts ==
It has been suggested that a more detailed study of variation in A. antipodum may be required, as it is possible that the singular species of Argyrophenga antipodum may instead be various separate, but very similar species. In the same study, however, it was maintained that various observations, sufficient evidence for regarding A. antipodum as one species was evident in a lack of wing colour pattern differences, consistency in male genital features, and apparent evolutionary intergradation of extreme forms of A. antipodum.

The common tussock is said to have interacted with various plant species, however without specific details of the nature of this exchange. Such plants include members of the bellflower family, daisy family (Asteraceae), family Gentianaceae, and the genus Wahlenbergia.

== See also ==
- Butterflies of New Zealand
