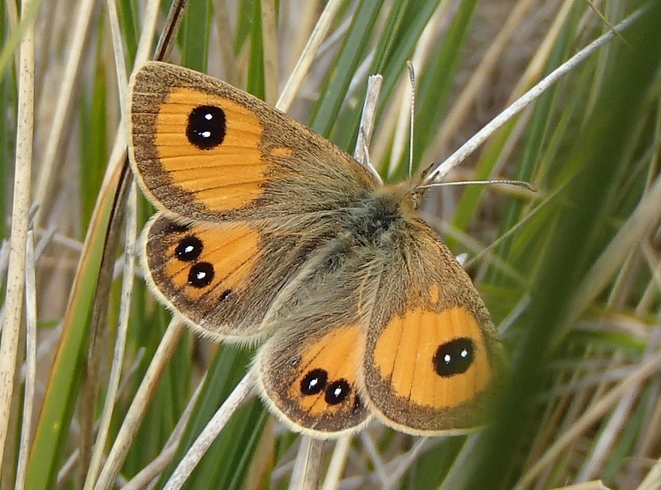

Conservation status
- Not Threatened (NZ TCS)

Scientific classification
- Kingdom: Animalia
- Phylum: Arthropoda
- Clade: Pancrustacea
- Class: Insecta
- Order: Lepidoptera
- Family: Nymphalidae
- Genus: Argyrophenga
- Species: A. janitae

Binomial name
- Argyrophenga janitae Craw, 1978

= Argyrophenga janitae =

Species of butterfly

Argyrophenga janitae, also known as Janita’s tussock, is a species of butterfly found in the South Island of New Zealand. It was first described by R. C. Craw in 1978. Under the New Zealand Threat Classification System it is listed as "Not Threatened".
