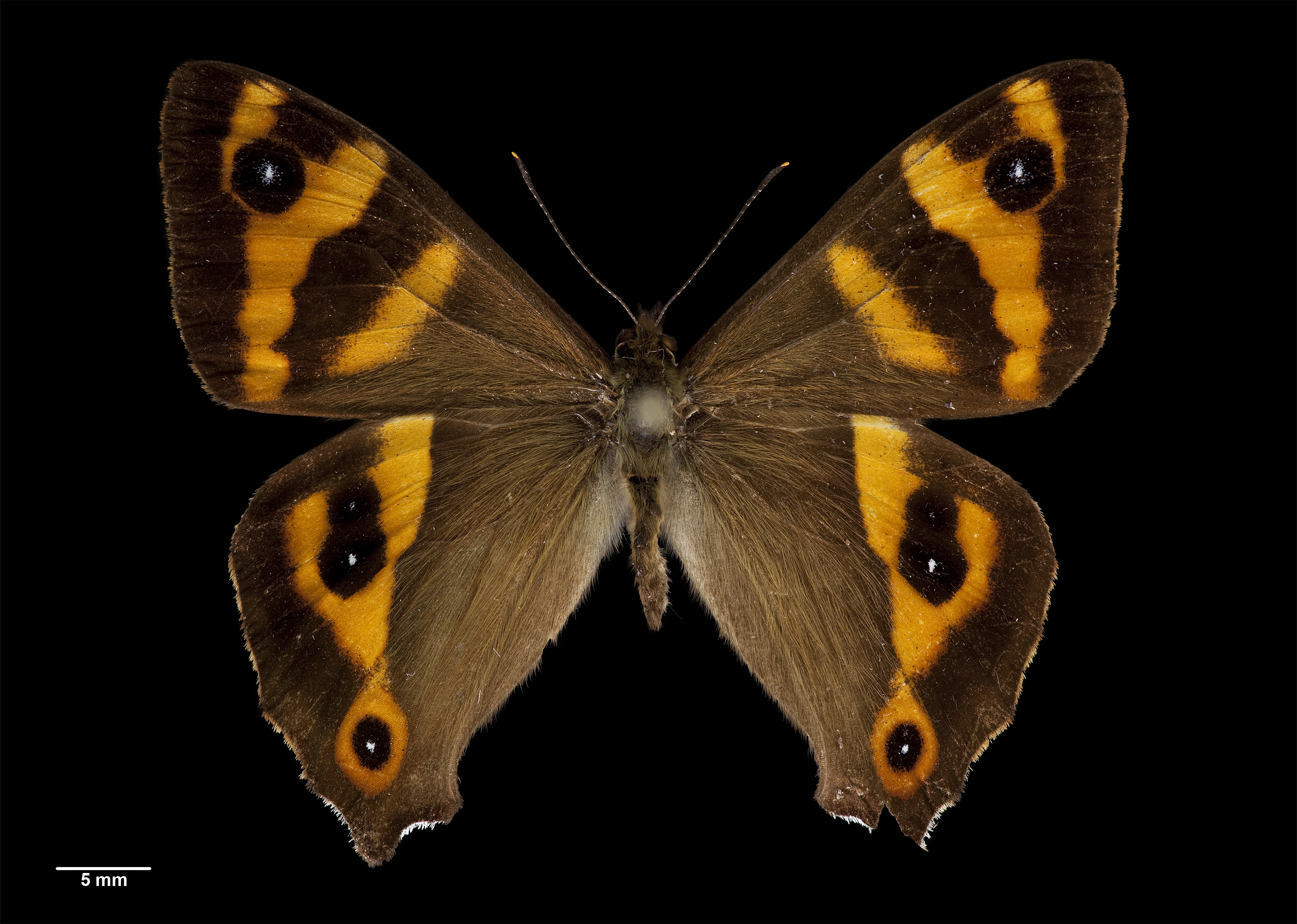
- Upperside
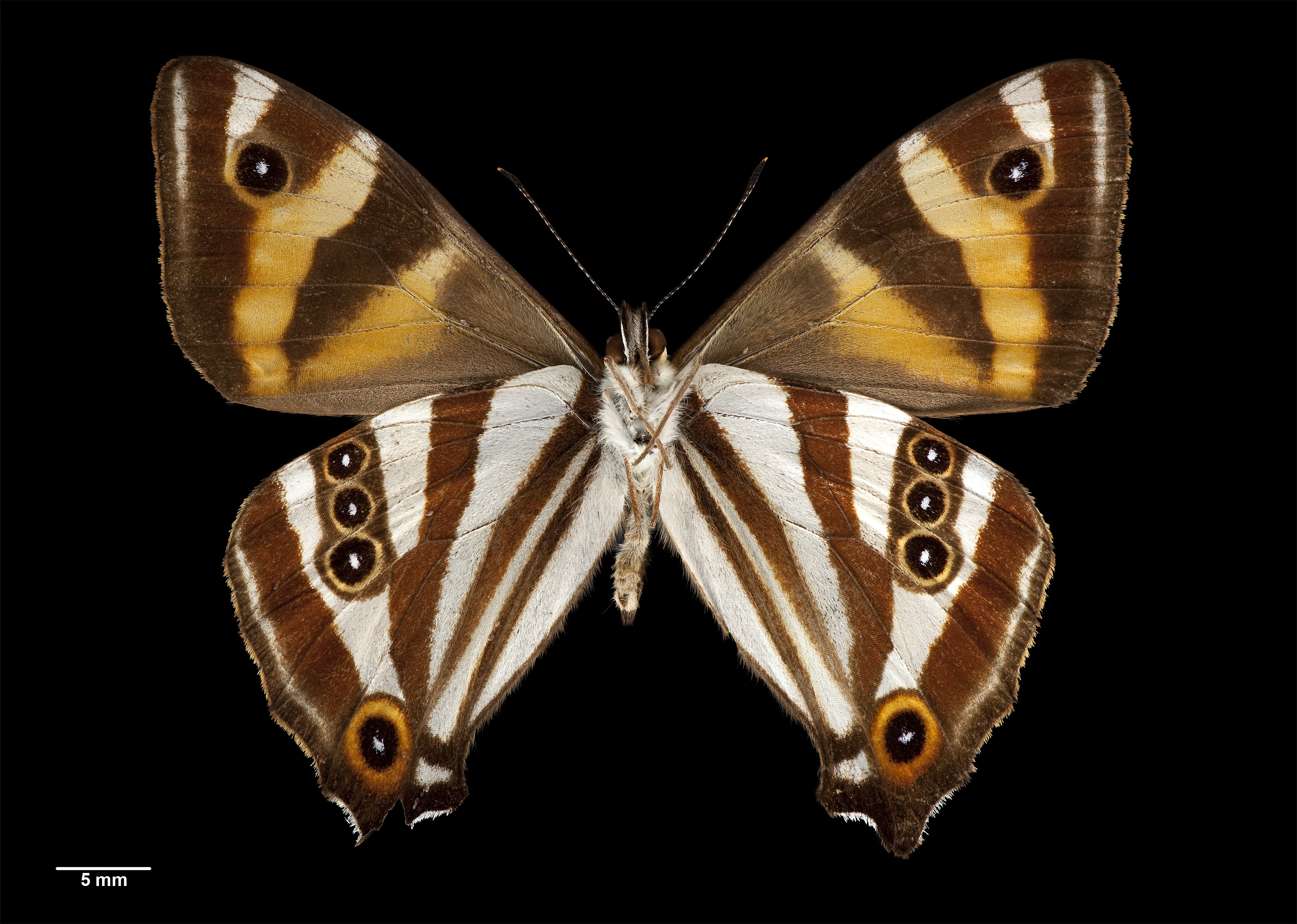
- Underside

Conservation status
- Relict (NZ TCS)

Scientific classification
- Kingdom: Animalia
- Phylum: Arthropoda
- Clade: Pancrustacea
- Class: Insecta
- Order: Lepidoptera
- Family: Nymphalidae
- Subtribe: Hypocystina
- Genus: Dodonidia; Butler, 1884
- Species: D. helmsii

Binomial name
- Dodonidia helmsii Butler, 1884

Synonyms
- [Dodonidia] helmsi Fereday, 1883

= Forest ringlet =

Species of butterfly

The forest ringlet (Dodonidia helmsii), also known as Helms' butterfly, or te pēpepe pōuri or pepe pouri in the Māori language, is a rare butterfly of the family Nymphalidae endemic to New Zealand. It is the only species in the genus Dodonidia.

== Taxonomy ==
The forest ringlet was first described by Richard William Fereday from a specimen collected in the Paparoa Range by a Mr R. Helms of Greymouth. Fereday gave it the specific name helmsi, but would not speculate as to its genus. The species was properly named in 1884 by Arthur Gardiner Butler, who coined the genus Dodonidia, from its resemblance to the Asian Dodona butterflies, and corrected the spelling of the species name to D. Helmsii (now D. helmsii).

Because it was named after Helms, it is properly known as "Helms' butterfly", although this is often misspelled as "Helm's butterfly". The name "forest ringlet" is more commonly used.

== Ecology ==
The forest ringlet caterpillar is nocturnal and feeds on "cutty grass" (Gahnia) and bush snowgrass (Chionochloa) from spring to early autumn. Adults live for three or four weeks and are fast-flying, found in January and February in clearings or near forest edges, mainly in beech (Nothofagus) forest north of about Lewis Pass.

== Predators, parasites and diseases ==
The cocoon and larvae of D. helmsii are parasitised by the wasp Meteorus pulchricornis.

== Conservation ==
Dodonidia helmsii was once widespread in New Zealand, including the Wellington and Auckland area, but has become significantly rarer over the last 50 years. There are two causes: the increasing rarity in lowland areas of the sedges that are its food plant, and the introduction of predatory wasps to New Zealand that prey on its larvae. Forest ringlets have disappeared from forest below 400 m altitude, but are still found at 600 m or higher, the altitudinal limit for the German and common wasps. This species has been classified as having the "At Risk, Relict" conservation status under the New Zealand Threat Classification System.

== See also ==
- Butterflies of New Zealand
