= Neofriseria mongolinella =

Scientific classification
- Kingdom: Animalia
- Phylum: Arthropoda
- Clade: Pancrustacea
- Class: Insecta
- Order: Lepidoptera
- Family: Gelechiidae
- Genus: Neofriseria
- Species: N. mongolinella

Binomial name
- Neofriseria mongolinella Piskunov, 1987

Species of moth

Neofriseria mongolinella is a moth of the family Gelechiidae. It is found in Russia (the southern Ural and Siberia: Tuva) and Mongolia.

== Taxonomy ==
It was formerly treated as a subspecies of Neofriseria sceptrophora.
