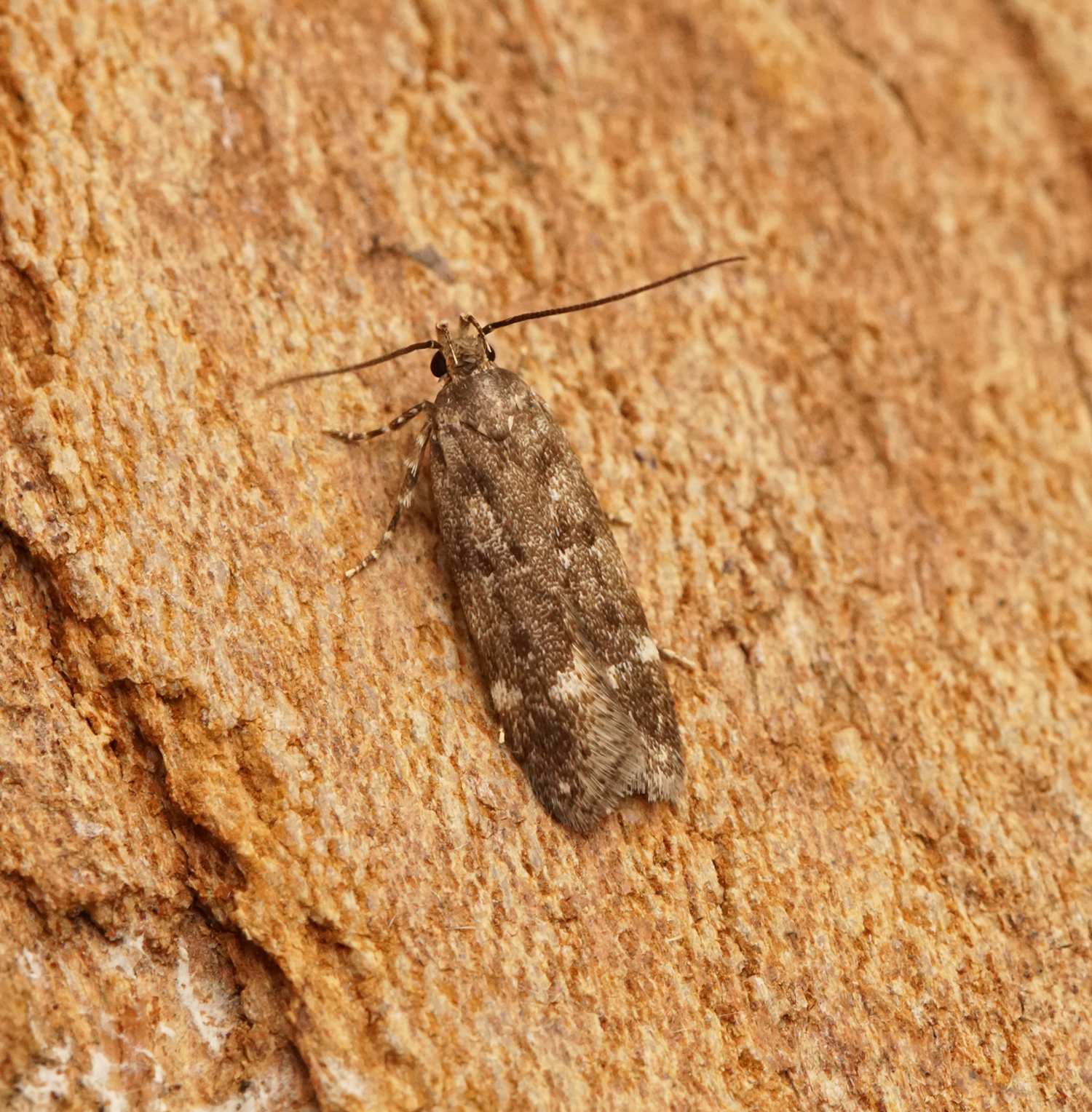
- Neofriseria singula

Scientific classification
- Domain: Eukaryota
- Kingdom: Animalia
- Phylum: Arthropoda
- Class: Insecta
- Order: Lepidoptera
- Family: Gelechiidae
- Genus: Neofriseria
- Species: N. singula

Binomial name
- Neofriseria singula (Staudinger, [1876])

Synonyms
- Lita singula Staudinger, [1876]; Lita amaurella Rebel, 1927; Gnorimoschema hispanicella Amsel, 1953; Teleia ifranella Lucas, 1956

= Neofriseria singula =

Species of moth

Neofriseria singula, the mottled groundling, is a moth of the family Gelechiidae. It was described by Otto Staudinger in 1876. It is found in most of Europe, except Norway, Finland, Belgium, Switzerland, Italy, the Balkan Peninsula and Ukraine. The habitat consists of heathlands.

The wingspan is 12–14 mm. Adults are on wing in June and July.

The larvae feed on Rumex acetosella.
