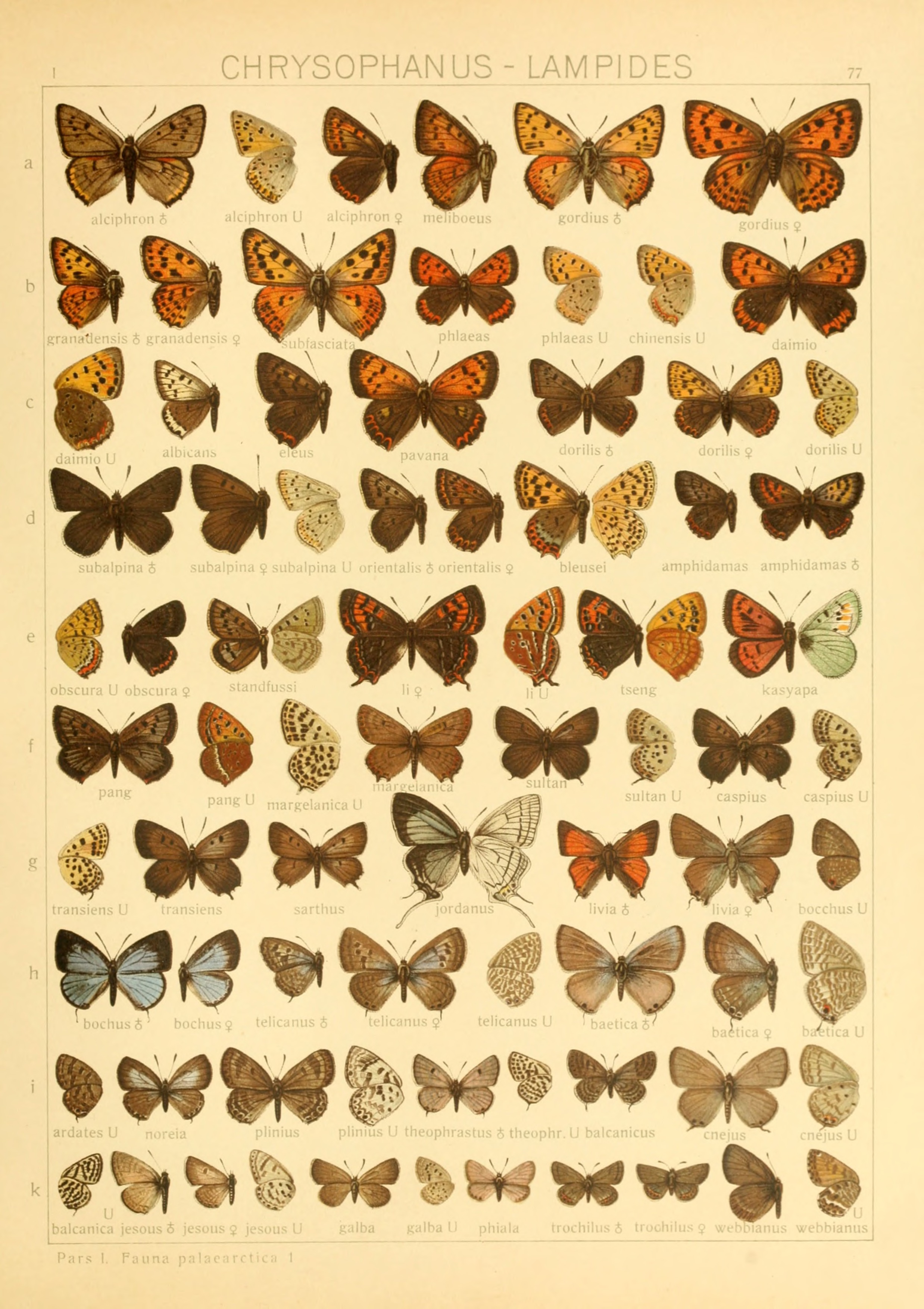

Scientific classification
- Kingdom: Animalia
- Phylum: Arthropoda
- Class: Insecta
- Order: Lepidoptera
- Family: Lycaenidae
- Genus: Lycaena
- Species: L. bleusei

Binomial name
- Lycaena bleusei (Charles Oberthür, 1884)

= Lycaena bleusei =

Species of butterfly

Lycaena bleusei, the Iberian sooty copper, is a butterfly of the family Lycaenidae, subfamily Lycaeninae. It is found in Portugal and Spain, in Europe.

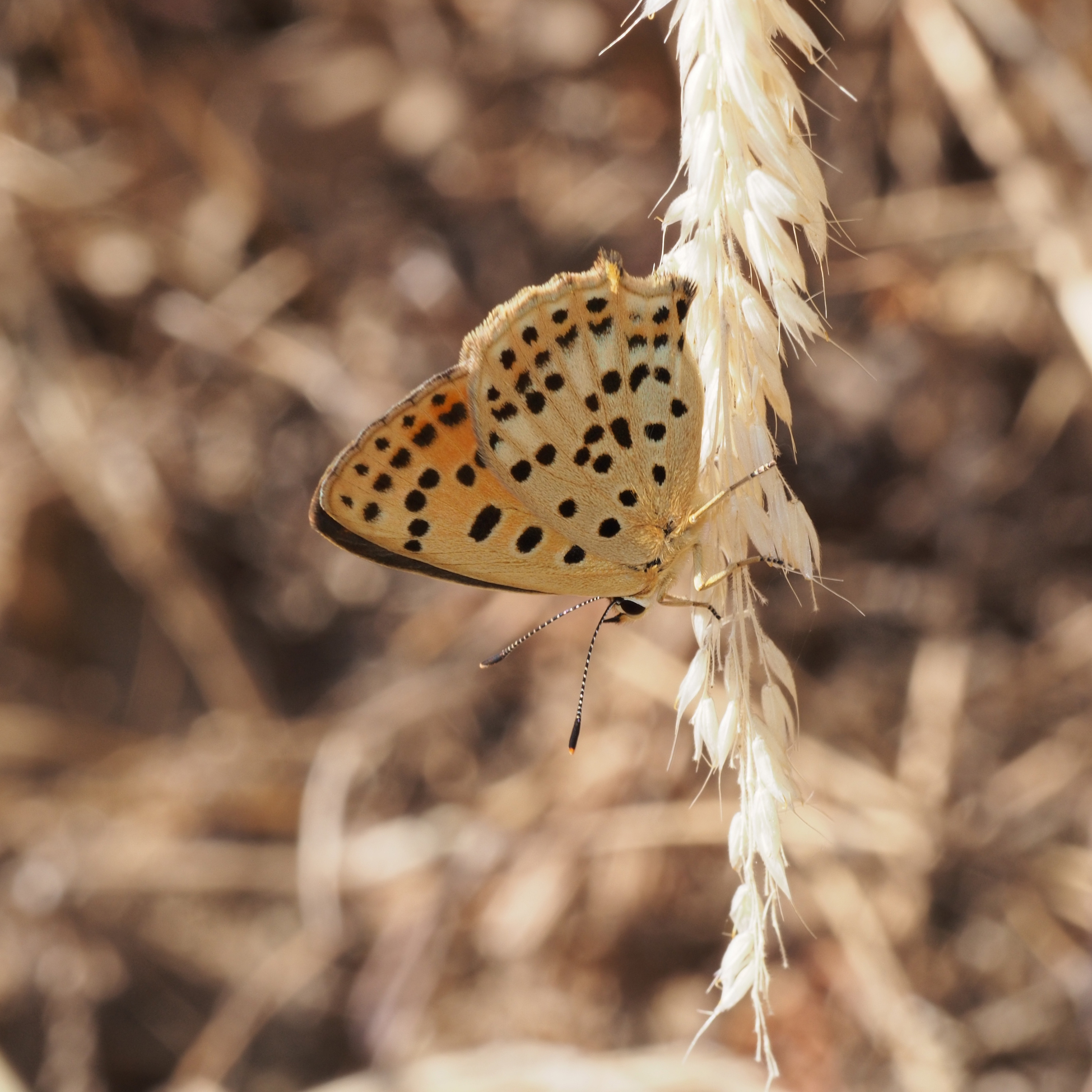
L. cf. bleusi Losar de la Vera, Extremadura, Spain

The wingspan is 28–30 mm (1.1–1.2 in). Compared to Lycaena tityrus it is brighter above, with stronger yellow variegation, and the hindwing has a short triangular tail and a strong blue sheen on the upperside. The black spots of the forewing stand out strikingly against a bright tawny (fauve) ground colour in the female. The butterfly flies from late March to November, depending on the location.

The larvae feed on Rumex acetosa, Rumex acetosella, Rumex crispus and other docks.

Populations of this species are found chiefly in central Spain and Central-northern Portugal, where the species is a specialist of meadows which tend to dry out during the summer, contrary to its sister species Lycaena tityrus
