= Sheep's sorrel soup =

Soup

- Alternative names: Kuzukulağı çorbası
- Type: Soup
- Serving temperature: Hot
- Main ingredients: Water, corn, sheep's sorrel leaves, beans, onions

Sheep's sorrel soup (Turkish: kuzukulağı çorbası) is a soup made from sheep's sorrel leaves, water, corn, beans, onions, butter, and salt. Sheep's sorrel soup is a dish from the Black Sea city of Giresun. It may have a tart and lemony flavor. It may be served garnished with chives or bull thistle, among other ingredients.

== See also ==
- Cuisine of Turkey
- List of soups
