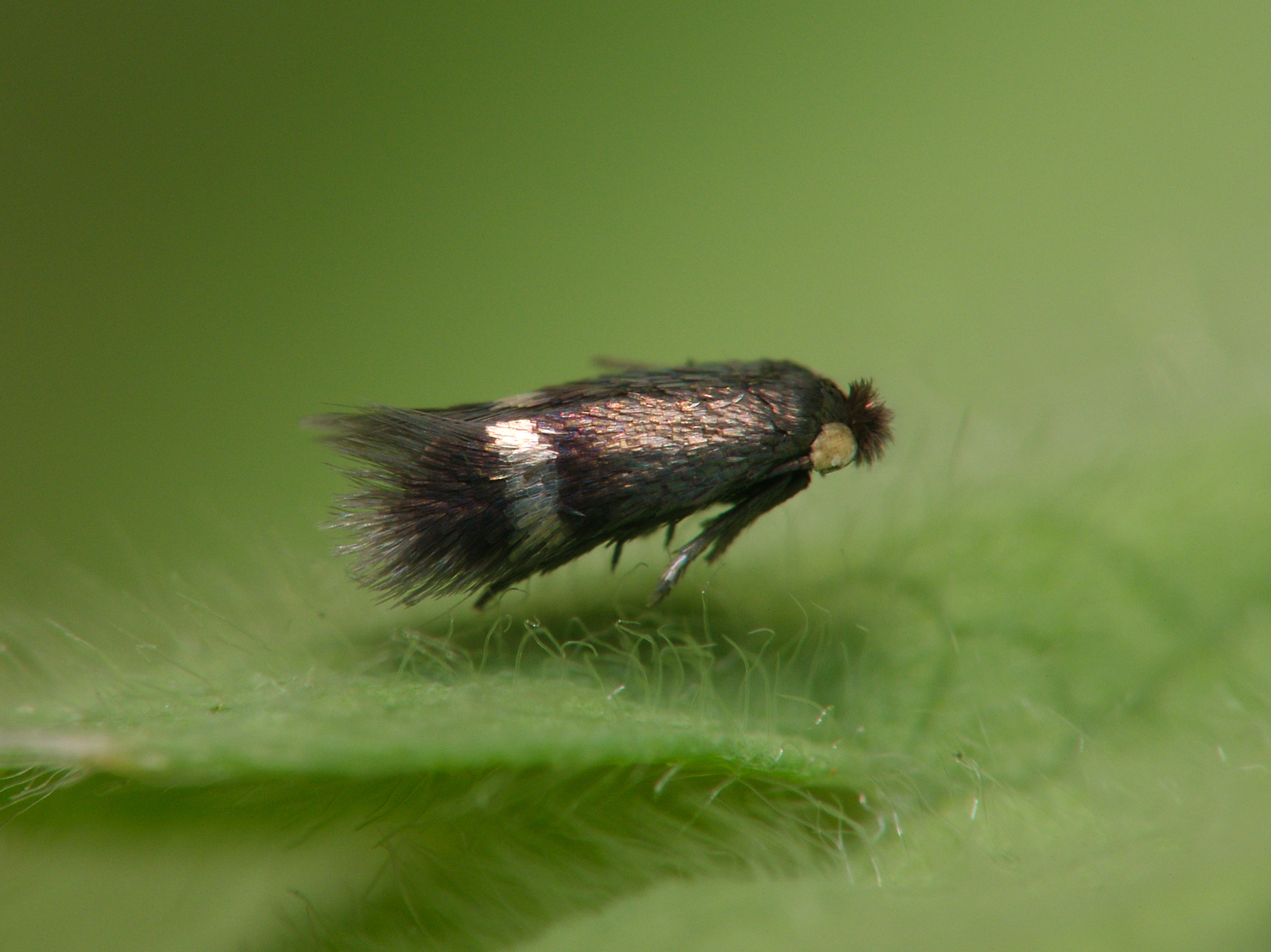

Scientific classification
- Kingdom: Animalia
- Phylum: Arthropoda
- Class: Insecta
- Order: Lepidoptera
- Family: Nepticulidae
- Genus: Enteucha
- Species: E. acetosae

Binomial name
- Enteucha acetosae (Stainton, 1854)

Synonyms
- List: Nepticula acetosae Stainton, 1854; Johanssonia acetosae (Stainton, 1854); Johanssoniella acetosae (Stainton, 1854); Nepticula arifoliella Klimesch, 1940

= Enteucha acetosae =

Species of moth

Enteucha acetosae, the pygmy sorrel moth, is a moth of the family Nepticulidae found in Europe. It is one of the smallest moths in the world with some having a wingspan of only 3mm. The larvae mine the leaves of docks (Rumex species), leaving bright red tissue around the mines.

== Life history ==
The wingspan is 3–4 mm. (one of the world's smallest moths). The head is fuscous to blackish. The antennal eyecaps are whitish. The forewings are shining bronze with a broad shining silvery fascia at 3/4, preceded by a fuscous suffusion. The apical area beyond this rather dark purplish-fuscous. The hindwings are grey.

There are two to three generations in western and central Europe.

Ovum

Eggs are laid on the underside of common sorrel (Rumex acetosa), sheep's sorrel (Rumex acetosella) and French sorrel (Rumex scutatus).

Larvae

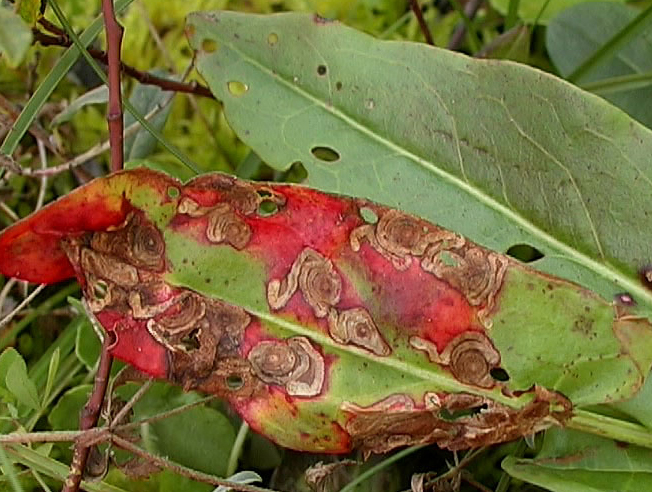
Enteucha acetosae mines

Larvae are pale amber/yellow with a greenish gut. The head is pale amber with a faint brown tinge. They mine the leaves of their host plant.

Pupa

Pupation is outside of the mine in a white cocoon, spun on detritus, which turns yellow as it ages.

== Distribution ==
The moth is found in Europe, from Sweden to the Pyrenees, Alps and Serbia and from Ireland to Romania.

== Etymology ==
Enteucha acetosae was described by the English entomologist, Henry Tibbats Stainton in 1854, from a specimen found in Dublin, Ireland. It was originally placed in the genus Nepticula, moved to Johanssonia and at present, Enteucha; which was raised by Edward Meyrick in 1915. The specific name acetosae refers to one of the food plants Rumex acetosa.
