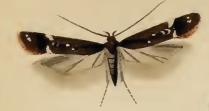

Scientific classification
- Domain: Eukaryota
- Kingdom: Animalia
- Phylum: Arthropoda
- Class: Insecta
- Order: Lepidoptera
- Family: Gelechiidae
- Genus: Neofriseria
- Species: N. peliella

Binomial name
- Neofriseria peliella (Treitschke, 1835)

Synonyms
- Lita peliella Treitschke, 1835

= Neofriseria peliella =

Species of moth

Neofriseria peliella is a moth of the family Gelechiidae. It is found in most of Europe (except Ireland and most of the Balkan Peninsula) east to the Ural Mountains. Outside of Europe, it is found in Turkey and North Africa.

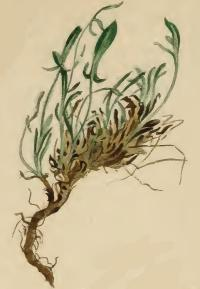
A sprig of Rumex acetosella eaten by larva

Larva

The wingspan is 13–17 mm. Adults are on wing from June to September.

The larvae feed on Rumex acetosella. Larvae can be found from August to May of the following year.
