= Onorati =

Onorati is a surname of Southern Italian origin. Notable people with the surname include:

- Giovanni Antonio Onorati (died 1606), Italian Roman Catholic bishop
- Onorato Onorati, Italian Roman Catholic bishop
- Nicola Onorati (1764–1822), 18th century Italian priest, writer, and agronomist
- Peter Onorati (born 1953), American actor
