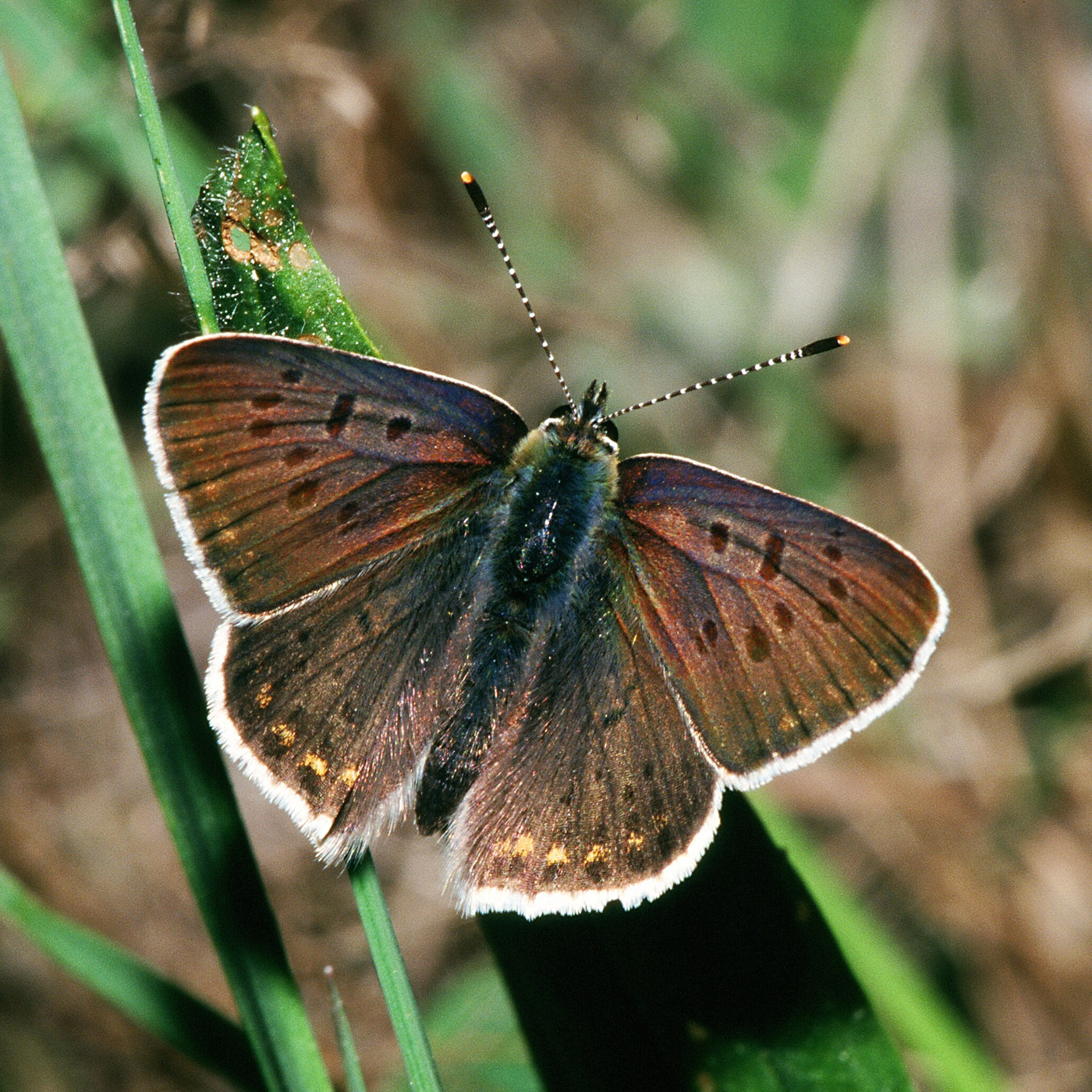
- Male, Saxony, Germany
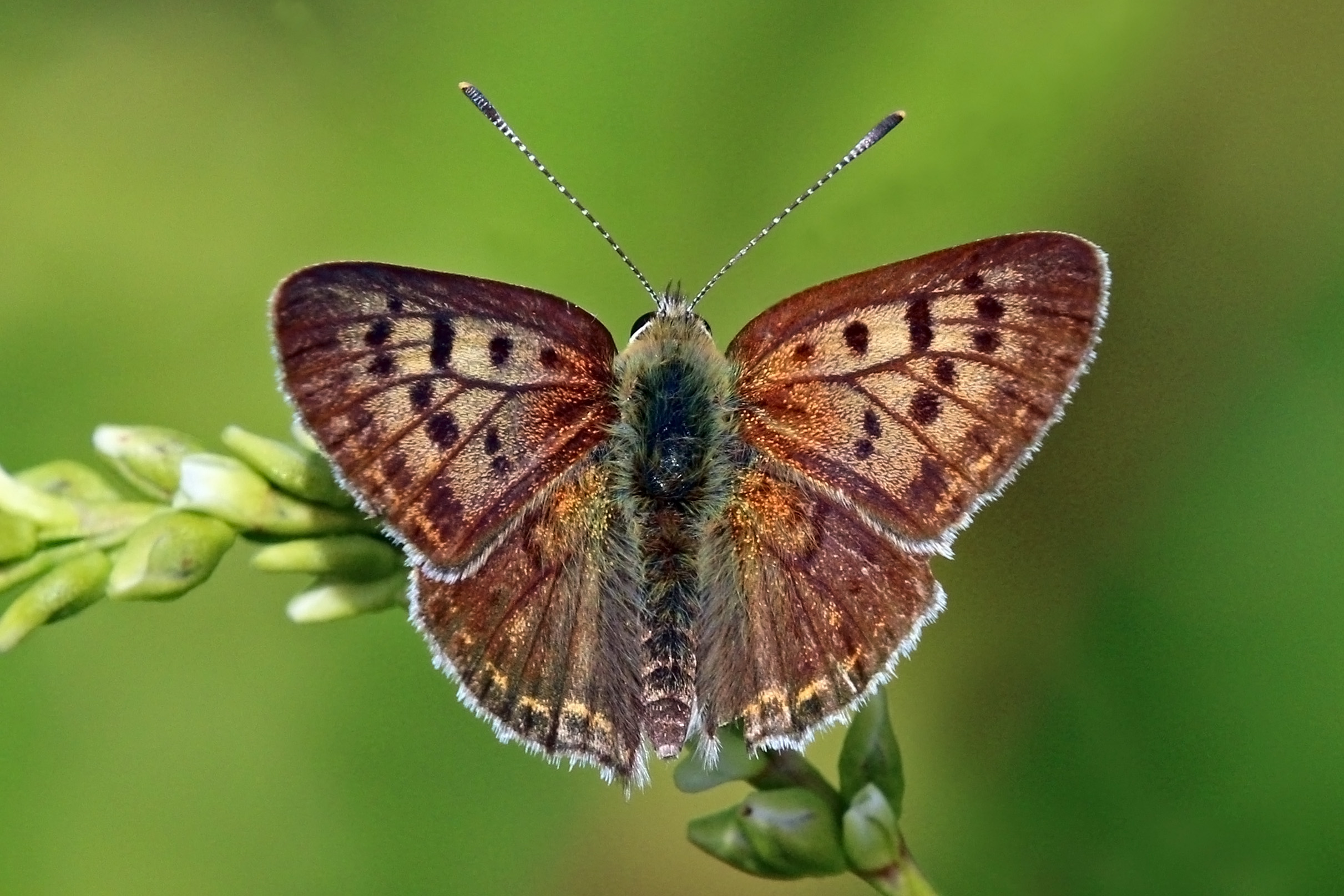
- Male, Amarante, Portugal

Scientific classification
- Kingdom: Animalia
- Phylum: Arthropoda
- Class: Insecta
- Order: Lepidoptera
- Family: Lycaenidae
- Genus: Lycaena
- Species: L. tityrus

Binomial name
- Lycaena tityrus (Poda, 1761)

= Lycaena tityrus =

Species of butterfly

Lycaena tityrus, the sooty copper, is a butterfly of the family Lycaenidae. It is found in Europe.

== Subspecies ==
- Lycaena tityrus tityrus (Poda, 1761) TL: Graz, Austria. Throughout Europe from Russia to central N. Spain.
- Lycaena tityrus subalpina (Speyer, 1851) TL: Patscherkofel, Innsbruck, Austria. In the Alps at high altitudes.
- Lycaena tityrus praebleusei Verity 1934 TL: Puerto de Pajares, Asturias, Spain. In NW. Iberia and W. France.

Lycaena bleusei (Oberthür, 1884) which has often been considered a subspecies of L. tityrus, has recently been confirmed as a species on its own according to genetics, wing-pattern variation, niche modelling and distribution.

The wingspan is 28–30 millimetres (1.1–1.2 in). The butterfly flies from April to October, depending on the location and subspecies (L. t. subalpina is univoltine in July).

The larvae feed on Rumex acetosa and Rumex acetosella.

== Description from Seitz ==
C. dorilis Hufn. (= circe Schiff., garbas F., phocas Rott., dorylas Kirby) (77 c) Male above black- brown, with a magnificent metallic green gloss when alive, with black spots corresponding to those of the underside and with a very thin reddish lunate line before the margin of the hindwing. Female above similar to phlaeas, but paler yellow, and with a very thin black edge instead of a broad black marginal band. Beneath yellowish grey, with very numerous black ocelli and small russet-red spots before the margin. Throughout Europe, from the North Sea to the Mediterranean, with the exception of Great Britain; also in Asia Minor. — In the much larger subalpina Spr. (= xanthe F., montana M.-Durr) (77 d)[now subspecies] the underside is more plumbeous grey than yellowish grey, and the red submarginal spots are reduced; from the Alps. — On the other hand, the underside of orientalis Stgr. (77 d) is more yellowish and the upperside of the female entirely blackish; from Anterior Asia to the Altai. — bleusei Oberth. (77d) [now full species Lycaena bleusei ] is much brighter above, with stronger yellow variegation, and the hindwing has a short triangular tail; from Castilia. — Also in this species specimens with abnormally dark upperside have been found: males which are devoid of the red submarginal band to the hindwing above — ab. obscurior S. L. (= fusca Gillm.) — and whose females are dark like the males, also specimens with more extended light yellow area on the forewing — ab. albicans Fuchs (= nyeni Ter Haar) —, both forms being quite inconstant. Other occasionally observed pale forms are a yellow one (ab. fulvior Stef.) and a white one (ab. upoleuca Verity). In ab. strandi Schultz the submarginal dots of the underside are modified to stripes, ab. brunnea Wheel, is an aberration of subalpina in which the dark upperside is devoid of the coppery sheen found in fresh subalpina. The ab. caeruleopunctata of phlaeas is represented among dorilis by ab. brantsi Ter Haar (= purpureopunctata Wheel.), in which the hindwing above bears a row of whitish dots before the outer third, ab. nana Wheel, is only a dwarfed form. In ab. fulvomarginalis Schultz the narrow red-yellow band of the hindwing above is continued on to the forewing also in the male— Egg semiglobular, dull green, somewhat darker at the top, coarsely punctured. Larva light green, minutely dotted with whitish, on the back occasionally with violet sheen, some specimens bear minute red markings. It hibernates and feeds until April and again in the summer, on Rumex. Pupa greenish or brown, with dark dorsal line and lighter sides, with minute dark dots. The butterflies occur all through the summer, in the south in three overlapping broods, on roads among fields and on broad sunny forest-roads; they visit according to season particularly Potentilla, Ranunculus, Chrysanthemum, Thymus and Leontodon, and, though not confined to certain flight-places, occur sometimes in large numbers together. In the Alps subalpina ascends to a considerable height (Seiser Alp). In some localities dorilis flies together with alciphron so that Mackee considers certain intermediate specimens to be hybrids (ab. xanthoides).

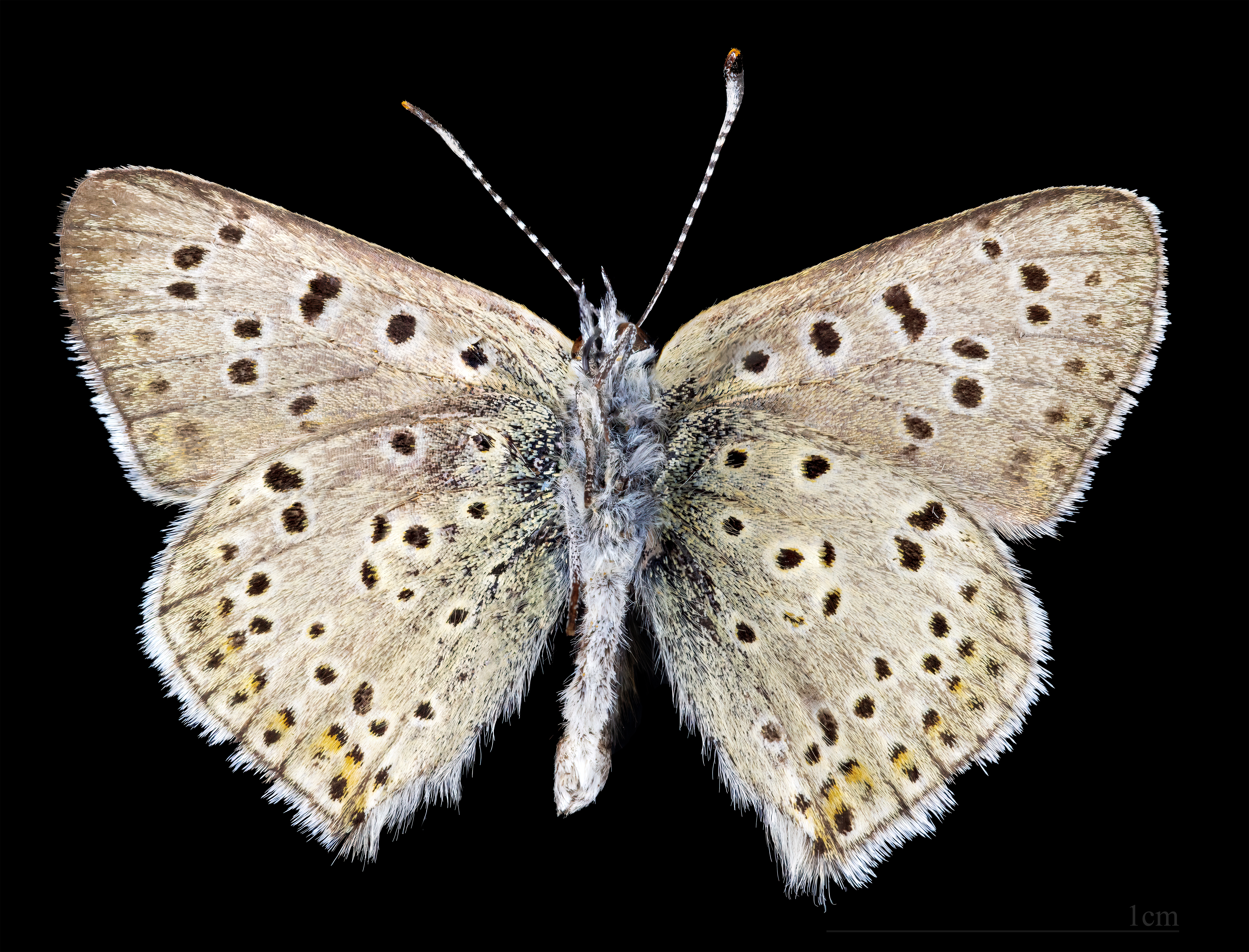
Lycaena tityrus ♀ △

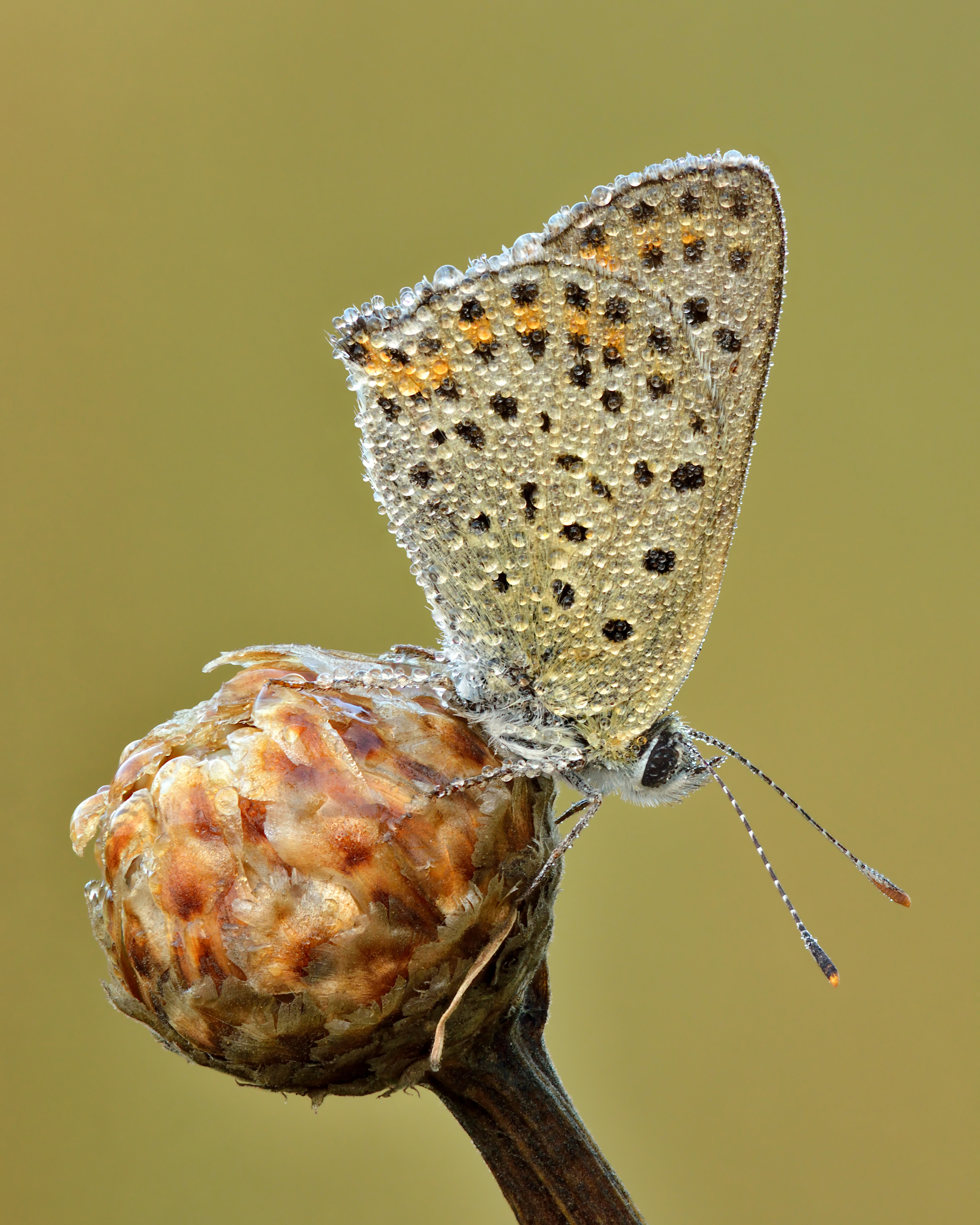
Kulna, Estonia

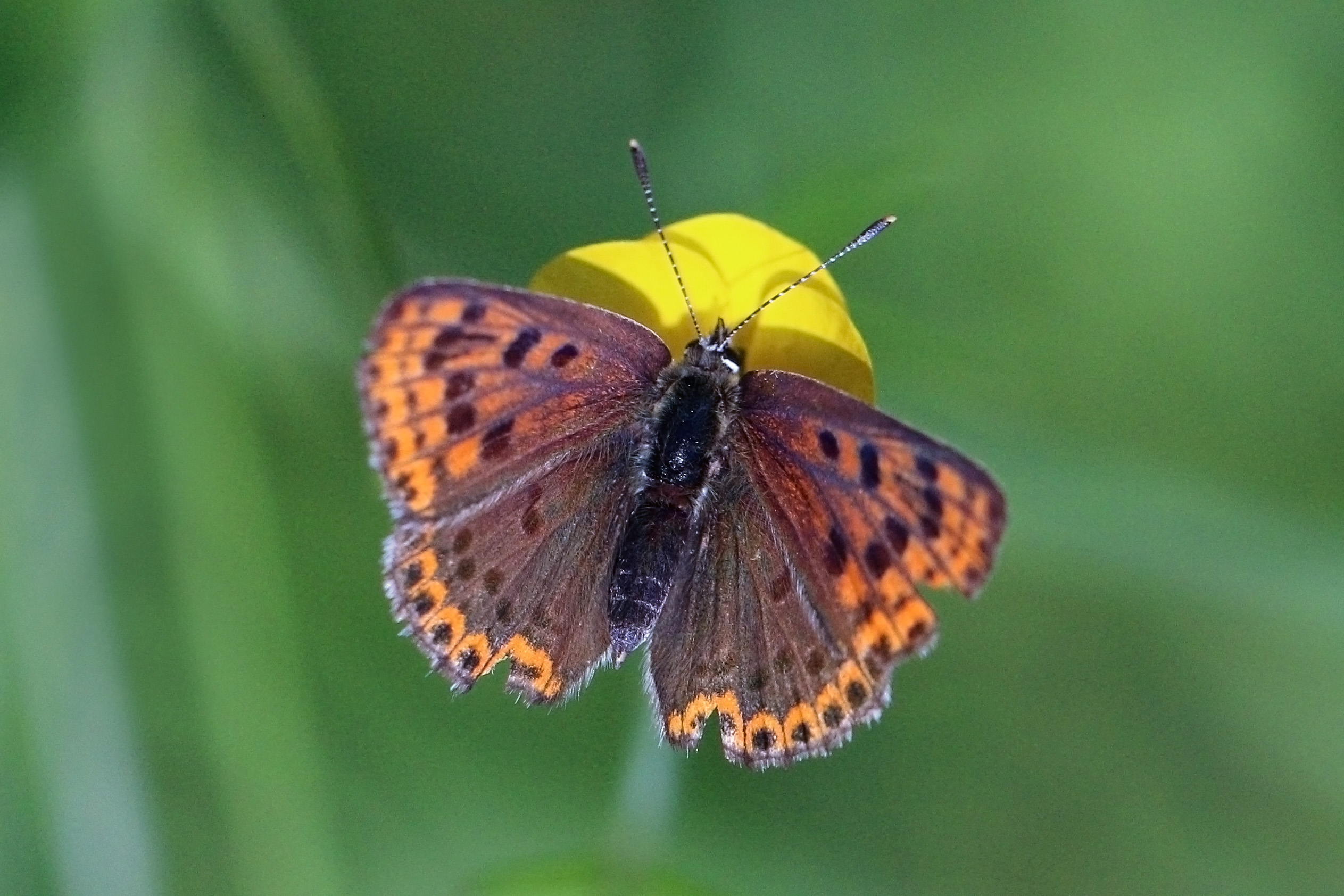
Female, Kampinos Forest, Poland

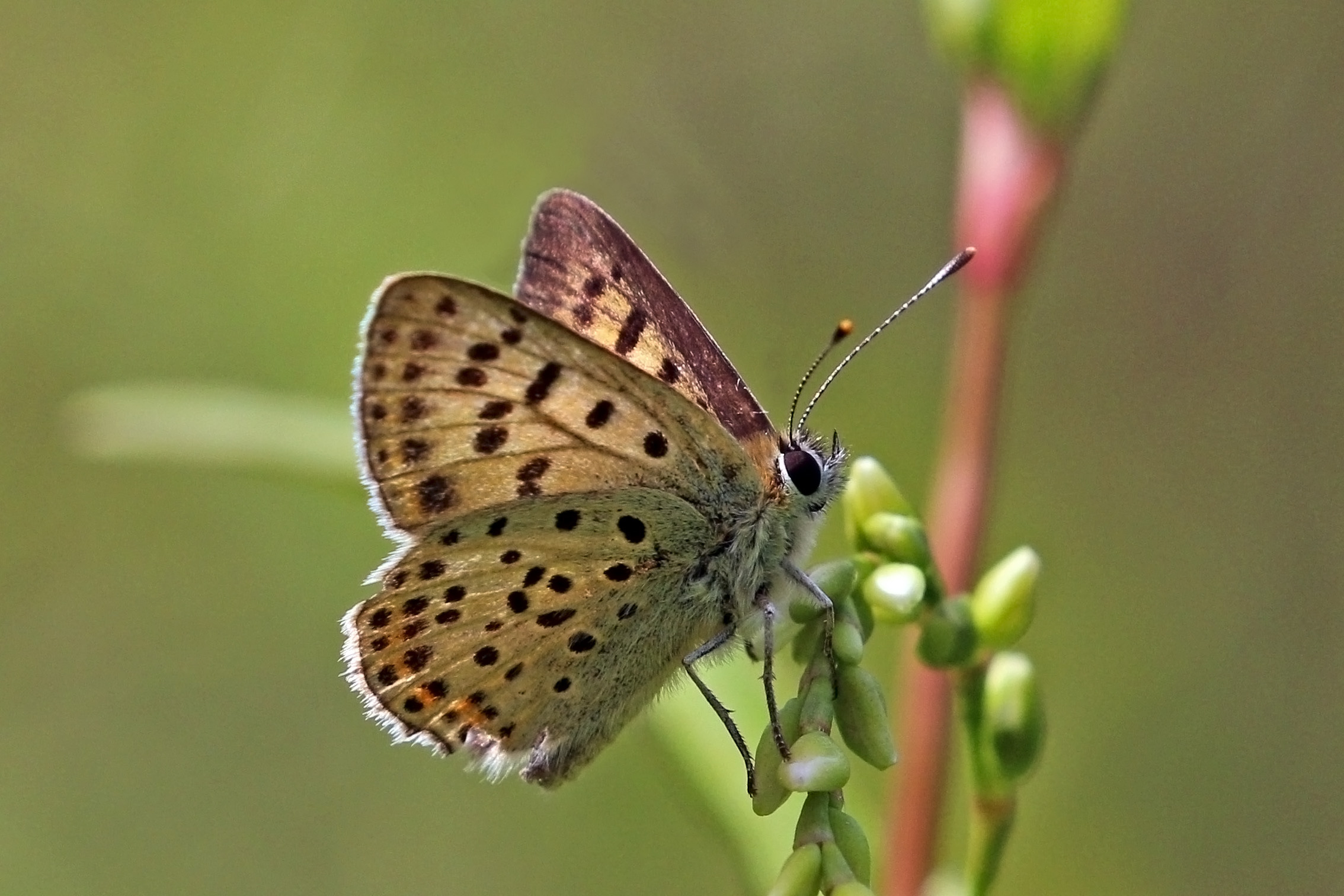
Male, Amarante, Portugal
