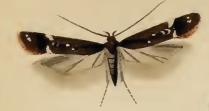
- Stainton’s Natural History of the Tineina (1855–1873): Neofriseria peliella

Scientific classification
- Kingdom: Animalia
- Phylum: Arthropoda
- Class: Insecta
- Order: Lepidoptera
- Family: Gelechiidae
- Tribe: Gelechiini
- Genus: Neofriseria; Sattler, 1960

= Neofriseria =

Genus of moths

Neofriseria is a genus of moths in the family Gelechiidae.

== Species ==
- Neofriseria baungaardiella Huemer & Karsholt, 1999
- Neofriseria caucasicella Sattler, 1960
- Neofriseria kuznetzovae Bidzilya, 2002
- Neofriseria mongolinella Piskunov, 1987
- Neofriseria peliella (Treitschke, 1835)
- Neofriseria pseudoterrella (Rebel, 1928)
- Neofriseria sceptrophora (Meyrick, 1926)
- Neofriseria singula (Staudinger, 1876)
- Neofriseria turkmeniella Piskunov, 1987

== Former species ==
- Neofriseria amseli Povolný, 1981 (now in Parapsectris)
- Neofriseria similis Povolný, 1981 (now in Parapsectris)
