= Enteucha guajavae =

Scientific classification
- Domain: Eukaryota
- Kingdom: Animalia
- Phylum: Arthropoda
- Class: Insecta
- Order: Lepidoptera
- Family: Nepticulidae
- Genus: Enteucha
- Species: E. guajavae

Binomial name
- Enteucha guajavae Puplesis & Diškus, 2002

Species of moth

Enteucha guajavae is a moth of the family Nepticulidae. It is found on the western foothills of the Andes in Ecuador, but probably has a much wider distribution.

The wingspan is 3.1-3.6 mm. Adults have been found in February.

The larvae feed on Psidium guajava. They mine the leaves of their host plant.
