= Enteucha basidactyla =

Scientific classification
- Kingdom: Animalia
- Phylum: Arthropoda
- Class: Insecta
- Order: Lepidoptera
- Family: Nepticulidae
- Genus: Enteucha
- Species: E. basidactyla

Binomial name
- Enteucha basidactyla (Davis, 1978)

Synonyms
- Oligoneura basidactyla Davis, 1978; Manoneura basidactyla (Davis, 1978)

Species of moth

Enteucha basidactyla is a moth of the family Nepticulidae. It is found along the south-western coast of Florida in the United States, as well as Dominica, Belize and Ecuador.

The wingspan is 4.3-4.9 mm for males and 5.3-5.4 mm for females. Adults are on wing in January, from April to May and in July.

The larvae feed on Coccoloba uvifera (seagrape) in the Caribbean.
