= Enteucha gilvafascia =

Scientific classification
- Kingdom: Animalia
- Phylum: Arthropoda
- Class: Insecta
- Order: Lepidoptera
- Family: Nepticulidae
- Genus: Enteucha
- Species: E. gilvafascia

Binomial name
- Enteucha gilvafascia (Davis, 1978)

Synonyms
- Artaversala gilvafascia Davis, 1978

Species of moth

Enteucha gilvafascia is a moth of the family Nepticulidae. It is found in coastal southern Florida, United States.

The wingspan is 3.1-3.7 mm. Adults have been collected from April to late June and again from early October to early January. There seem to be two generations per year.

The larvae feed on Coccoloba uvifera (seagrape). They mine the leaves of their host plant.
