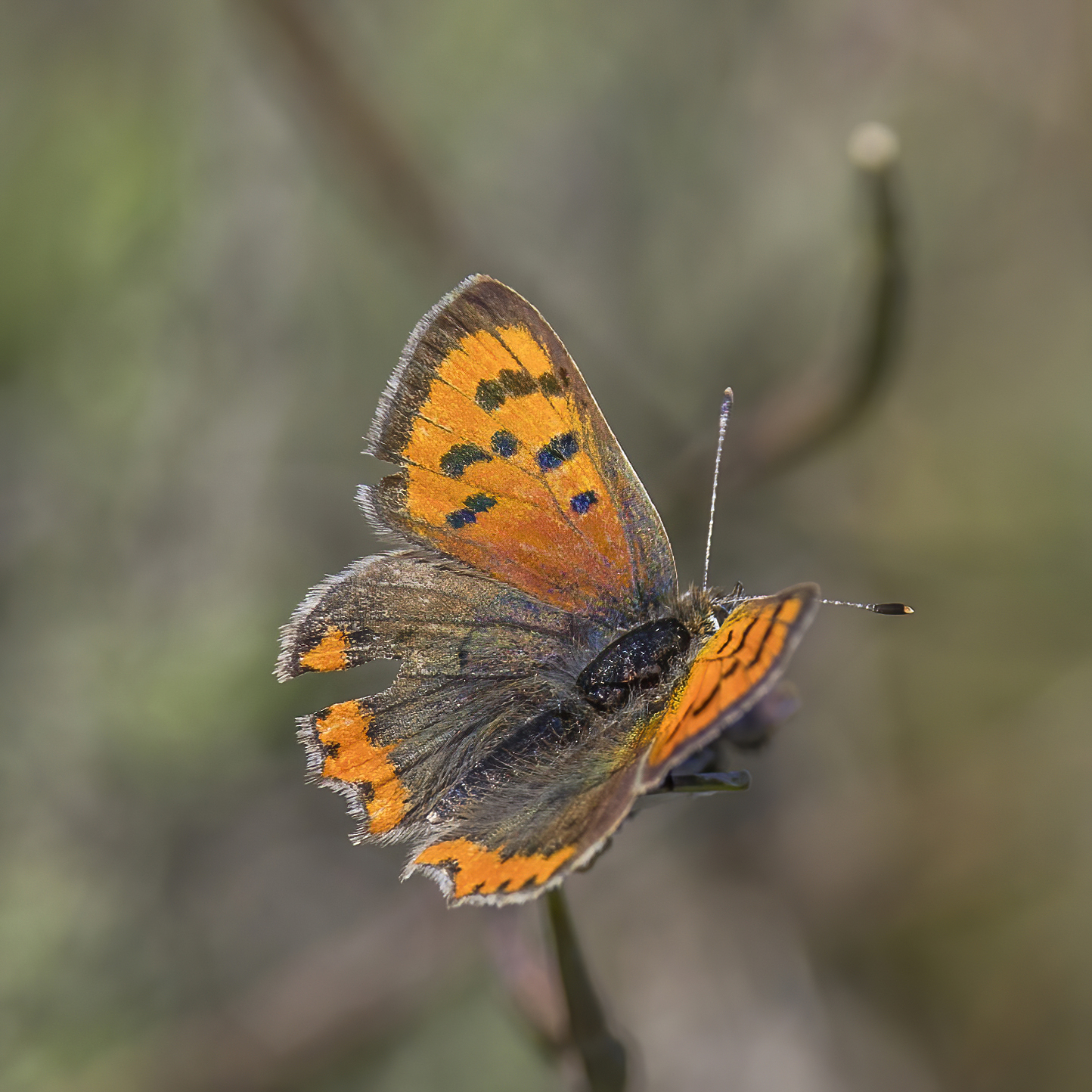
- L. p. phlaeus Extremadura, Spain
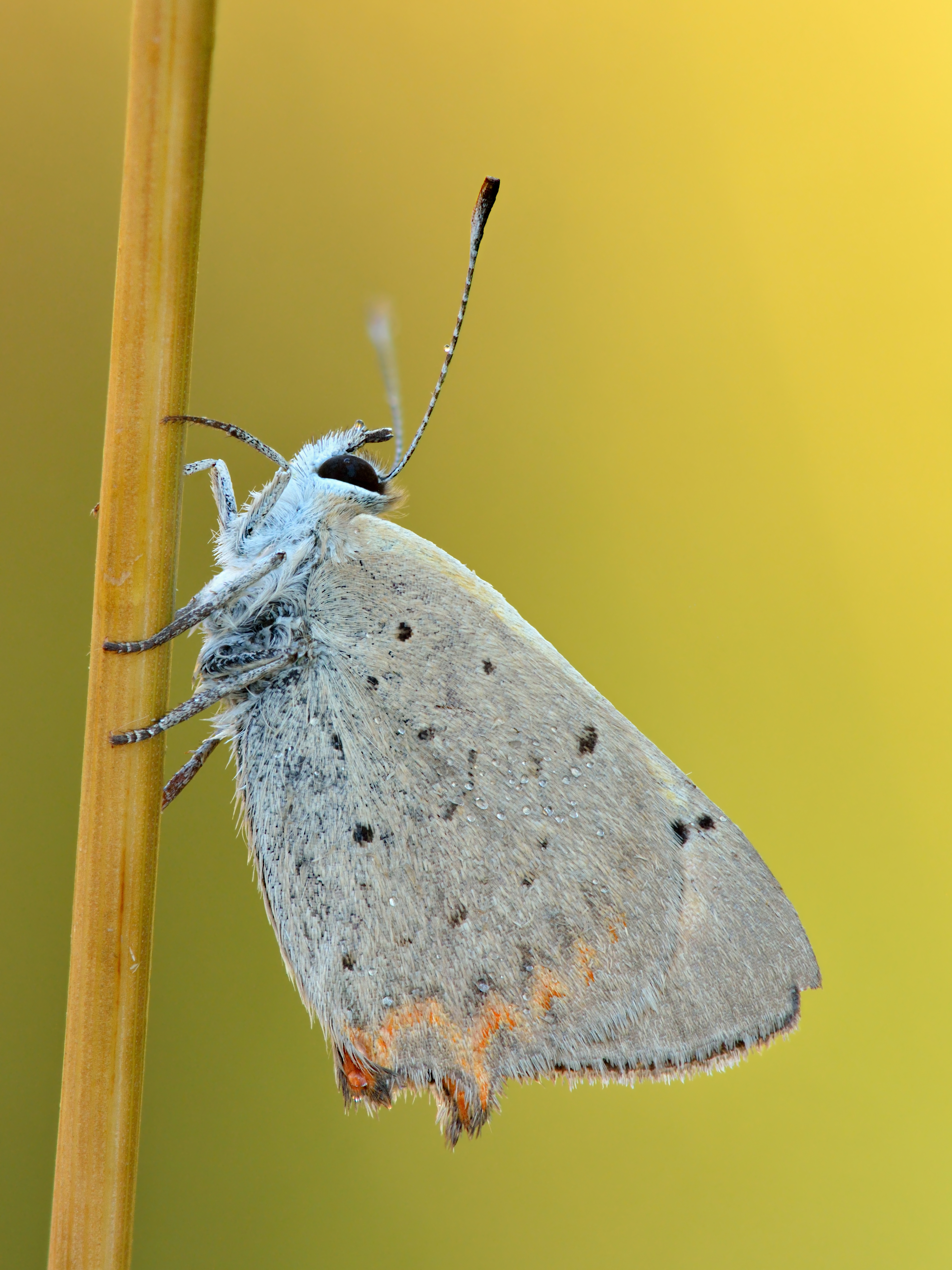

Conservation status
- Secure (NatureServe)

Scientific classification
- Kingdom: Animalia
- Phylum: Arthropoda
- Clade: Pancrustacea
- Class: Insecta
- Order: Lepidoptera
- Family: Lycaenidae
- Genus: Lycaena
- Species: L. phlaeas

Binomial name
- Lycaena phlaeas (Linnaeus, 1761) Synonymy: Papilio phlaeas Linnaeus, 1761; Papilio timeus Cramer, [1777]; Papilio virgaureae Scopoli, 1763; Lycaena phlaeas aestivus Zeller, 1847; Polyommatus turcicus Gerhard, 1853; Heodes hyperborea Ford, 1924; Chrysophanus phloeas feildeni McLachlan, 1878; Heodes phlaeas coccineus Ford, 1924; Heodes phlaeas flavens Ford, 1924; Heodes ethiopica Poulton, 1922; Lycaena phlaeas f. polaris Courvoisier, 1911; Lycaena phlaeus chinensis ab. kurilensis Matsumura, 1928; Heodes kuriliphlaeas Bryk, 1942; Chrysophanus arethusa Dod, 1907; Chrysophanus abbottii Holland, 1892; Chrysophanus abbottii Holland, 1896; Polyommatus phlaeas var. comedarum Grum-Grshimailo, 1890; Polyommatus phlaeas var. oxiana Grum-Grshimailo, 1890; Polyommatus turanica Rühl, 1895; Lycaena phlaeas f. naruena Courvoisier, 1911; Heodes coccineus Ford, 1924; Chrysophanus pseudophlaeas Lucas, 1866; Chrysophanus phlaeas var. menelicki Thierry-Mieg, 1910; Heodes matsumuranus Bryk, 1946; Polyommatus hypophlaeas Boisduval, 1852; Lycaena americana Harris, 1862; Chrysophanus phlaeas var. americana ab. fasciata Strecker, 1878; Chrysophanus americanus ab. fulliolus Hulst, 1886; Lycaena bacchus Scudder, 1889; Heodes hypophlaeas ab. obliterata Scudder, 1889; Chrysophanus phlaeas adrienne Maynard, 1891; Heodes hypophlaeas f. caeca Reiff, 1913; Chrysophanus hypohplaeas ab. octomaculata Dean, 1918; Heodes hypophlaeas hypophlaeas ab. banksi Watson & Comstock, 1920; Heodes hypophlaeas ab. fulvus Rummel, 1929; Heodes hypophlaeas ab. neui Rummel, 1929; Hesperia eleus Fabricius, 1798; Lycaena phlaeas f. caerulopunctata Rühl, 1895; Chrysophanus phlaeas ab. oberthuri Blachier, 1908; Lycaena shima Gabriel, 1954

= Lycaena phlaeas =

Species of butterfly

Lycaena phlaeas, the small copper, American copper, or common copper, is a butterfly of the Lycaenids or gossamer-winged butterfly family. According to Guppy and Shepard (2001), its specific name phlaeas is said to be derived either from the Greek φλέγω (phlégo), "to burn up", or from the Latin floreo, "to flourish".

== Description ==
The upperside forewings are a bright orange with a dark outside edge border and with eight or nine black spots. The hindwings are dark with an orange border. Some females also have a row of blue spots inside the orange border and are known as form caeruleopunctata. The undersides are patterned in a similar way but are paler. The black spots on the forewings are outlined in yellow and the dark colouring is replaced by a pale brownish grey. The hindwings are the same brown/grey colour with small black dots and a narrow orange border. The caterpillars (larvae) are usually green, but some have a purple stripe down the middle of the back and along each side.

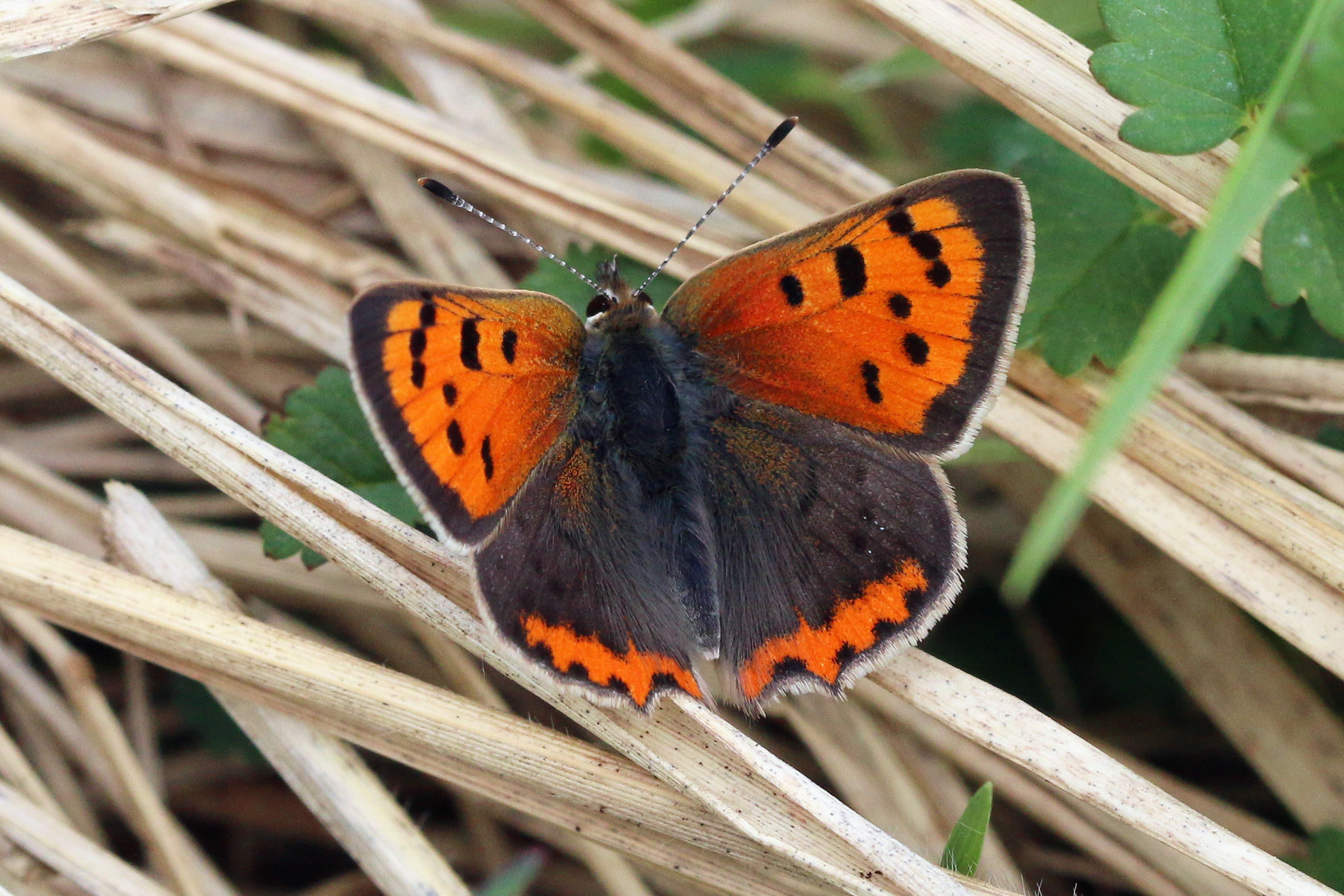
L. p. eleus
Oxfordshire

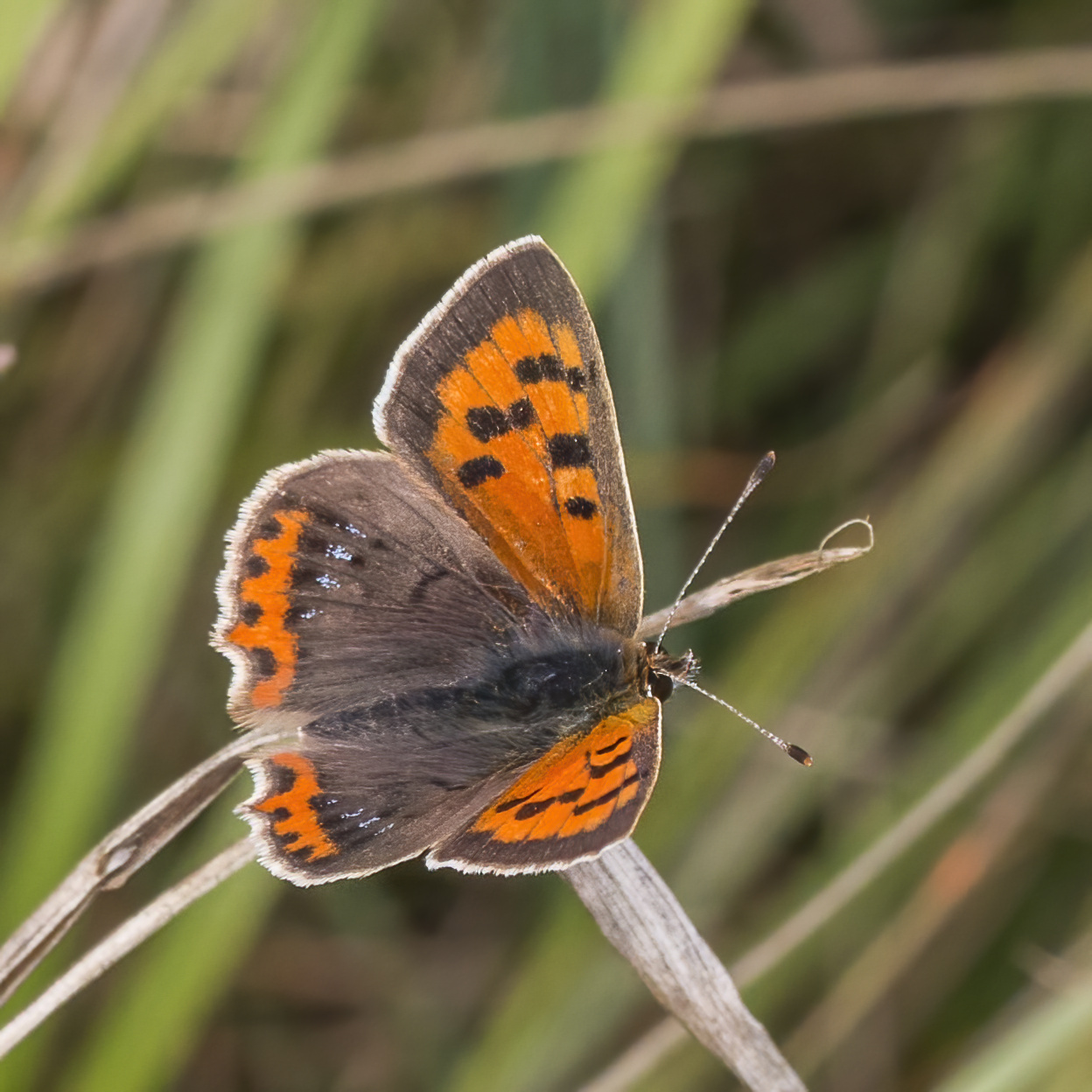
male L. p. eleus ab. caeruleopunctata
Oxfordshire

L. p. eleus taking flight
Japan

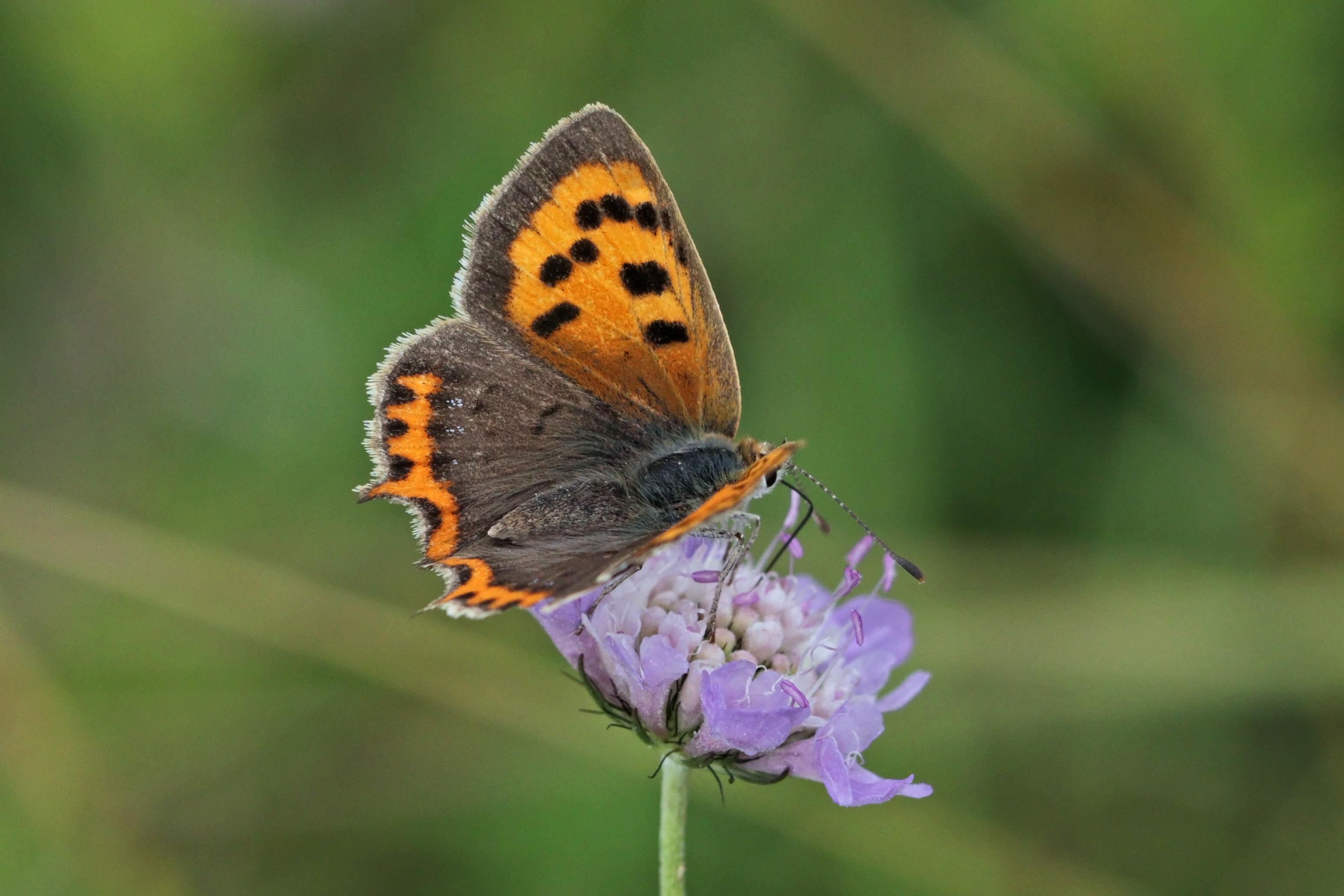
female L. p. eleus
Buckinghamshire

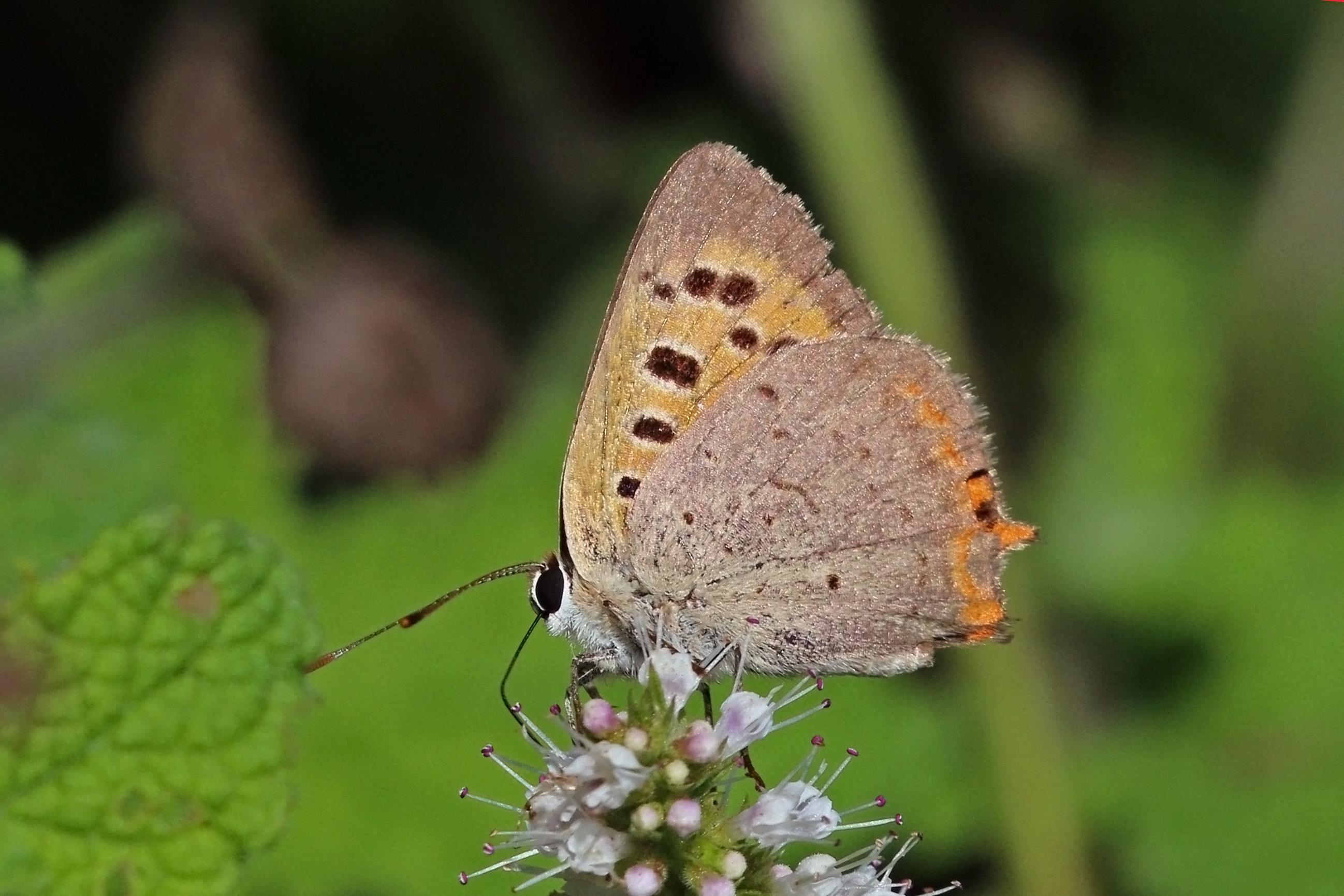
L. p. phlaeas male
Amarante, Portugal

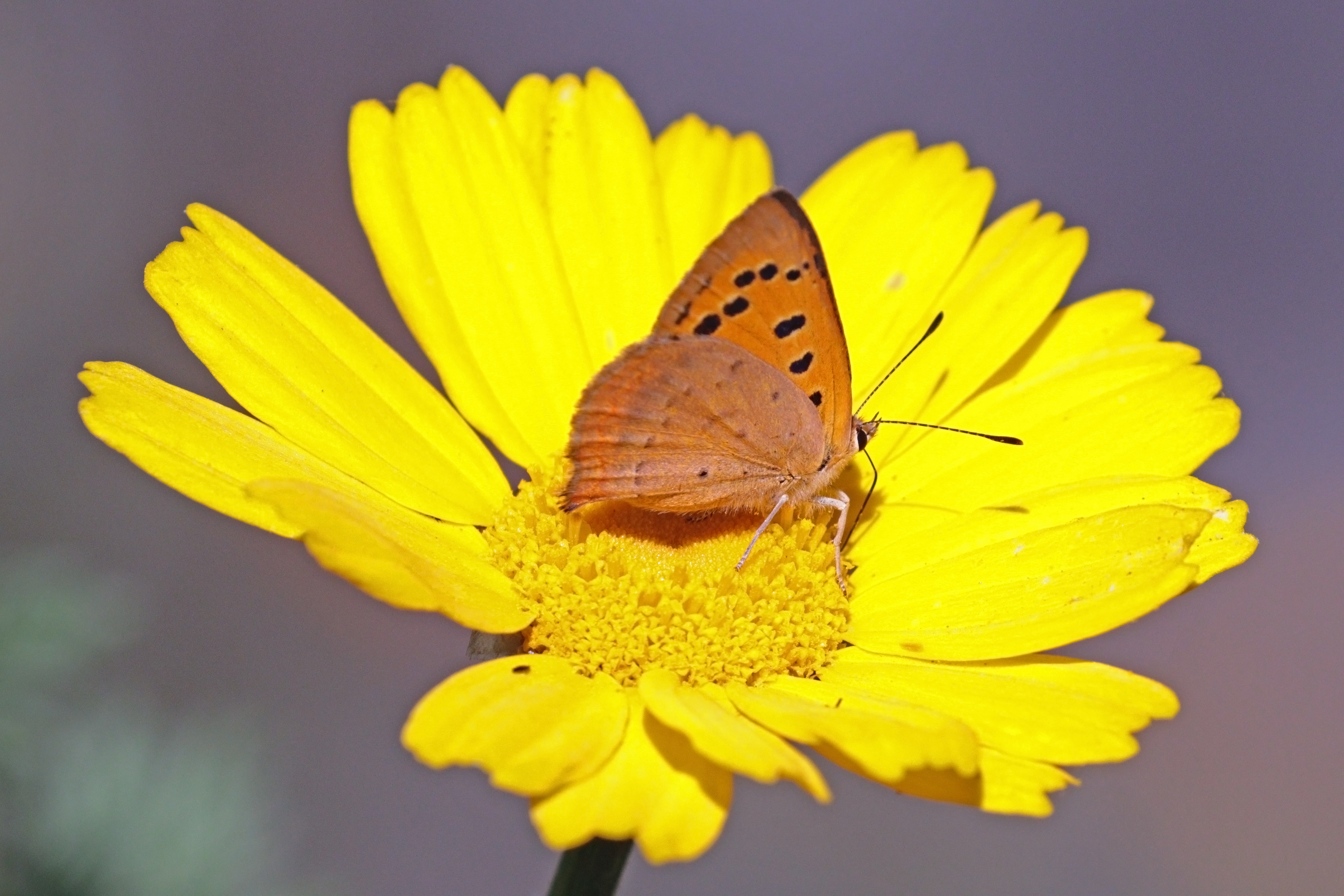
L. p. pseudophlaeas
Bale Mountains, Ethiopia

== Range ==
It is a holarctic species, widespread and common across Europe, Asia, North America, and also found in North Africa south through to Ethiopia.

It can be found almost anywhere in south/central England and Wales although never, it seems, in large numbers. Its distribution becomes more patchy in northern England, Scotland and Ireland.

== Habitat ==
It is found in a wide variety range of habitats from chalk downlands, heathland, and woodland clearings, to churchyards and waste ground in cities.

== Habits ==
It is most active in bright sun, with males setting up small territories which they will defend vigorously against rival males or any passing insect. Even the shadow of a large bird passing overhead can be enough to elicit a response. Females are pursued and mating usually occurs in vegetation.

== Life cycle ==
The eggs are laid singly and conspicuously on the upperside of food plant leaves and the young caterpillar feeds on the underside of the leaf creating "windows" by leaving the upper epidermis of the leaf untouched. Pupation takes place in the leaf litter and the pupa is thought to be tended by ants. There are between two and three broods a year, fewer further north. In exceptionally good years, a fourth brood sometimes occurs in the south and adults can still be seen flying into November. The species overwinters as a caterpillar.

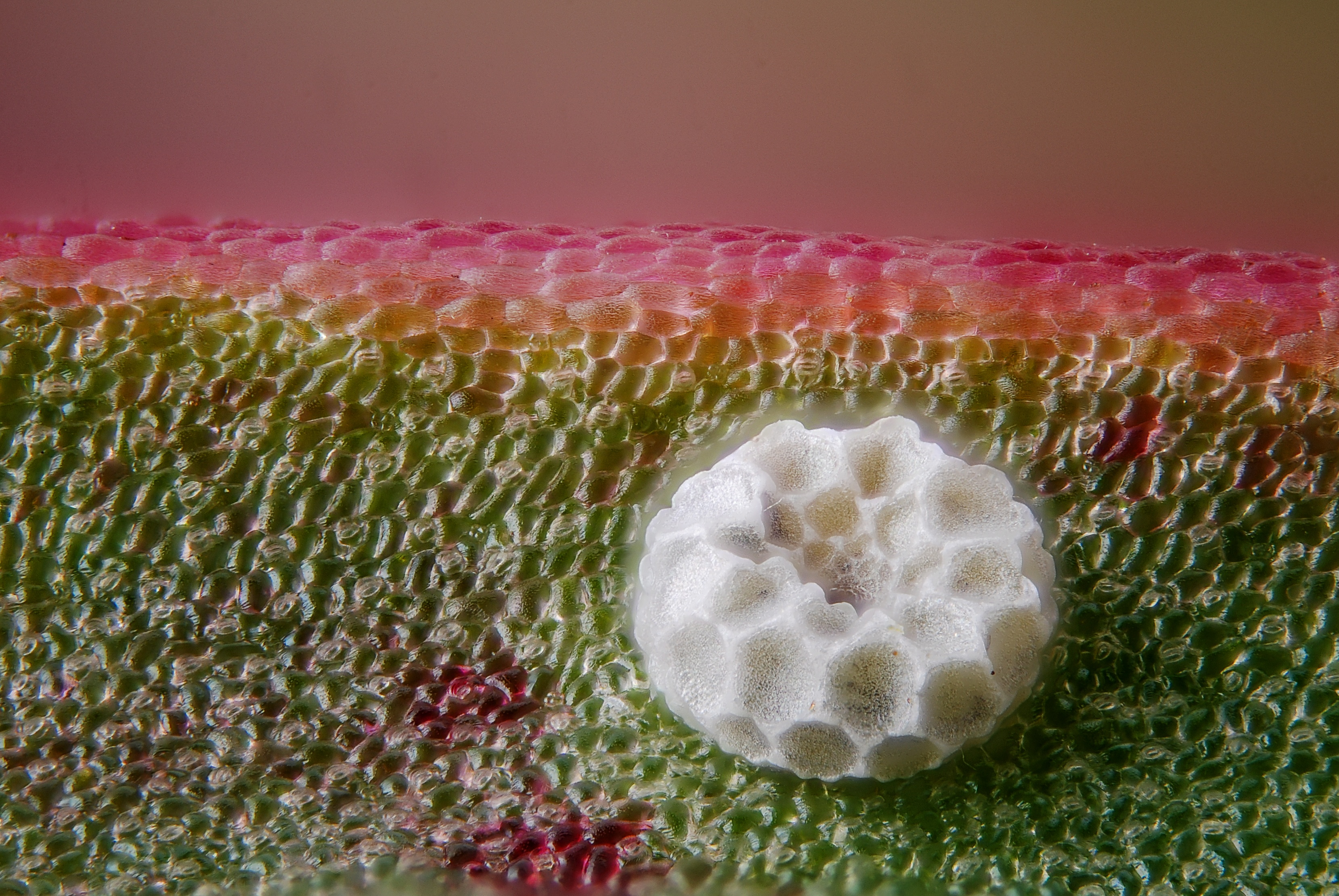
Egg

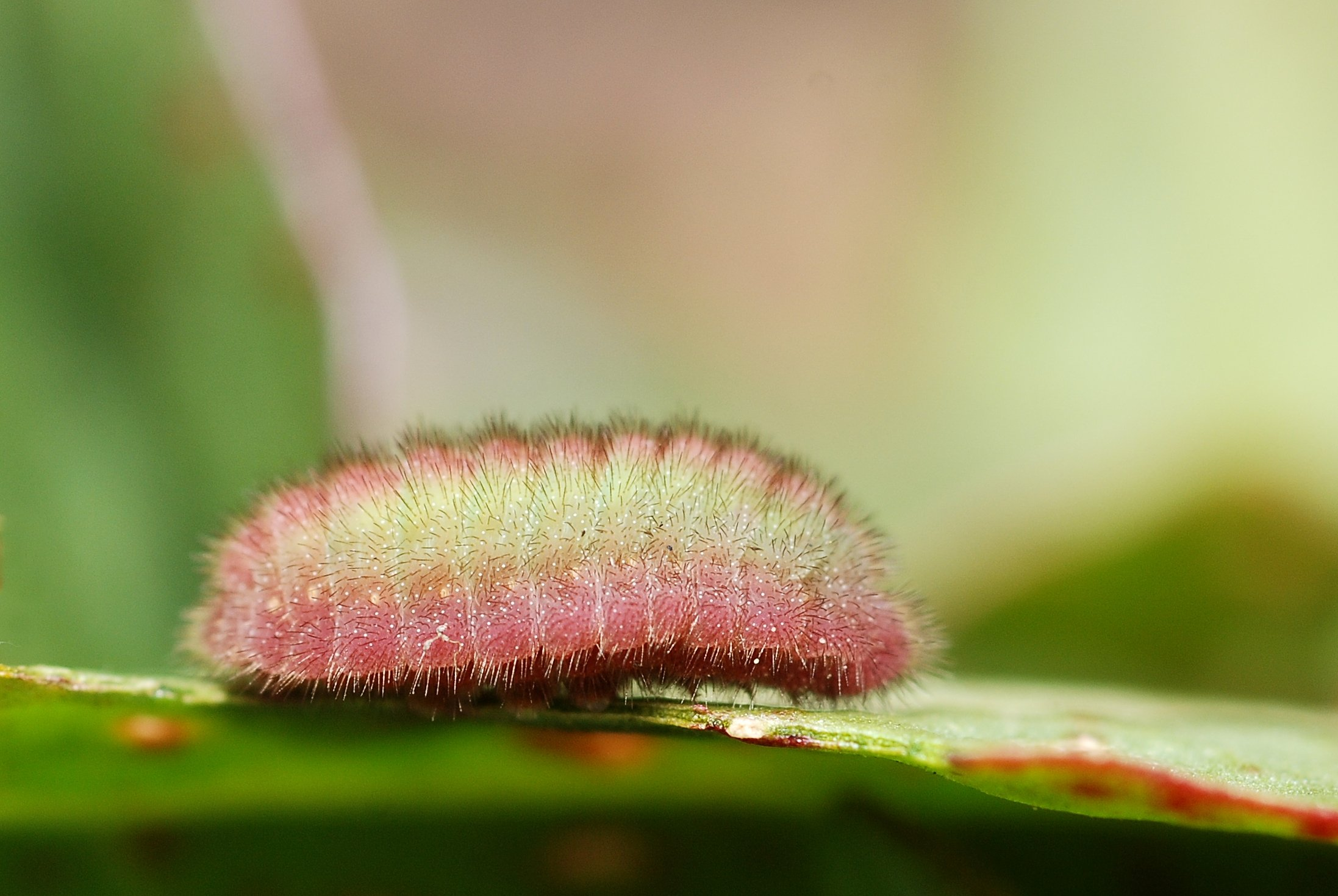
Larva

== Host plants ==
Depending on the habitat, common sorrel (Rumex acetosa) and sheep's sorrel (Rumex acetosella) are the two main food plants, although other Rumex species are occasionally used.

== Systematics ==
Lycaena phlaeas belongs to the subgenus Lycaena and is the type-species of genus Lycaena. The species is in turn divided into several subspecies, although many probably lack reason to be named, and others may merit an elevation of rank to be considered autonomous species:

- L. p. hibernica Goodson, 1948 — Republic of Ireland, Northern Ireland
- L. p. eleus Fabricius, 1798 — England, Wales, Scotland
- L. p. phlaeas Linnaeus, 1761 — Europe, western Siberia, Caucasus, South Caucasus (type locality = Sweden)
- L. p. polaris Courvoisier, 1911 — northern Ural Mountains, northern Siberia, Chukotka Peninsula (Russia)
- L. p. kamtschatica Gorbunov, 1994 — Kamchatka Peninsula (Russia)
- L. p. ganalica Gorbunov, 1995 — Kamchatka Peninsula (Russia)
- L. p. daimio (Seitz, [1909]) — south Kurile Islands, Sakhalin (Russian islands)
- L. p. gonpaensis (Yoshino, [2019]) — North Yunnan, China
- L. p. hypophlaeas (Boisduval, 1852) — N California Sierra Nevada Mts. (Type location) and White Mts., Altai Mountains, southern Siberia, Amur (Russia–NW China border region), northern Ussuri (adjacent to Amur)
- L. p. chinensis (Felder, 1862) — southern Ussuri
- L. p. oxiana (Grum-Grshimailo, 1890) — Kopet Dag mountains, Alai Mountains, Ghissar-Darvaz, Tian Shan mountains
- L. p. comedarum (Grum-Grshimailo, 1890) — eastern Pamir Mountains
- L. p. stygiana Butler, 1880 — western Pamir Mountains
- L. p. shima Gabriel, 1954 — Arabia
- Lycanea phlaeas pseudophlaeas (Lucas, 1866) — Ethiopia, Uganda
- L. p. ethiopica (Poulton, 1922) — Ruwenzori Mountains (SW Uganda)
- L. p. abbottii (Holland, 1892) — Kenya, Tanzania, Malawi
- L. p. flavens (Ford, 1924) — Tibet
- L. p. coccinea (Ford, 1924)
- L. p. americana (Morris, 1862) — Nova Scotia and W. to Minnesota, and S. to: Virginia, Montane N Georgia, Missouri, Kansas, N Dakota.
- L. p. arethusa (Dod, 1907) — Alberta
- L. p. arctodon Ferris, 1974 — Montana
- L. p. feildeni (McLachlan, 1878) — Ellesmere
- L. p. alpestris Emmel & Pratt, 1998 — California
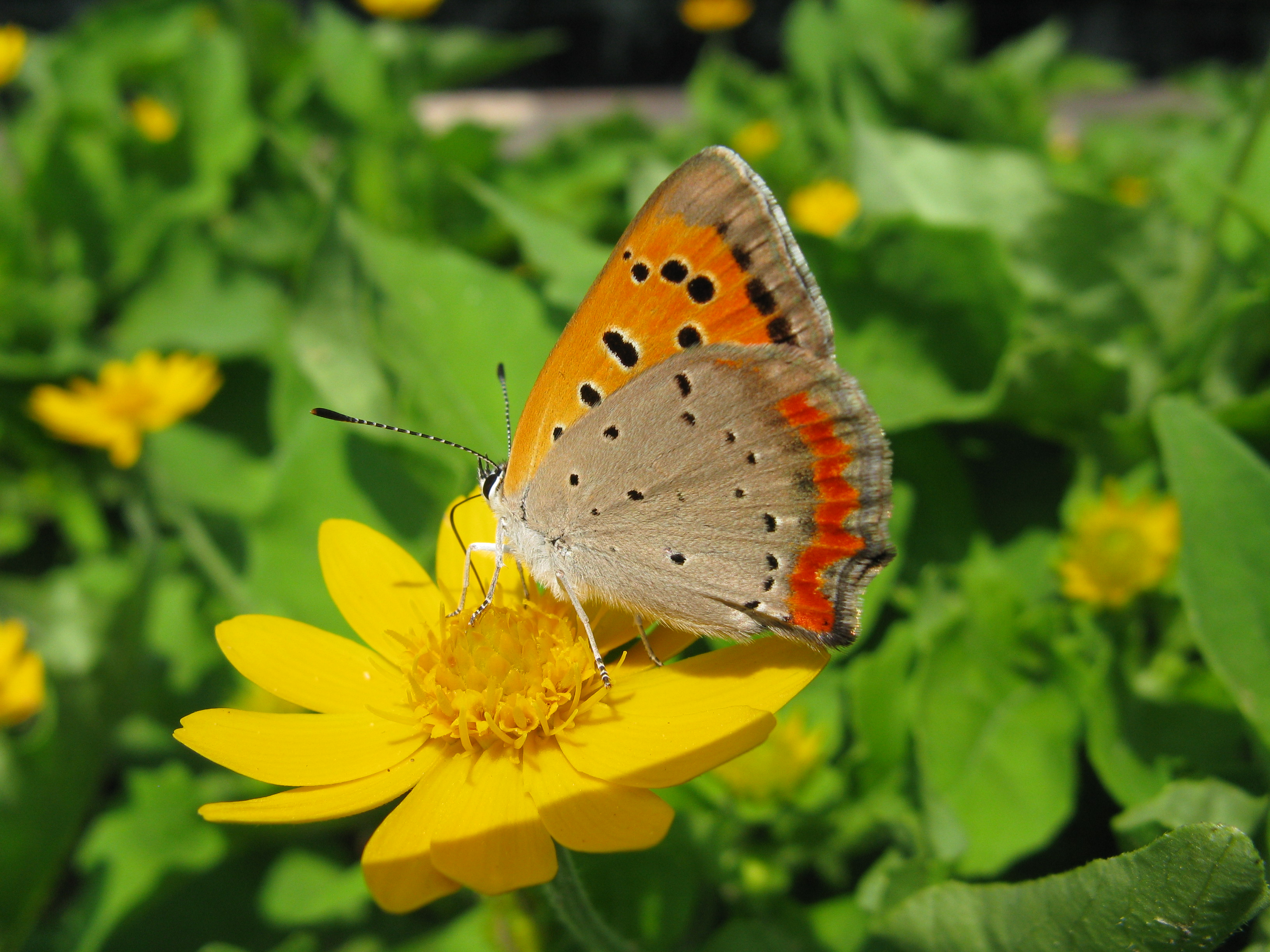
Subspecies daimio, Osaka, Japan

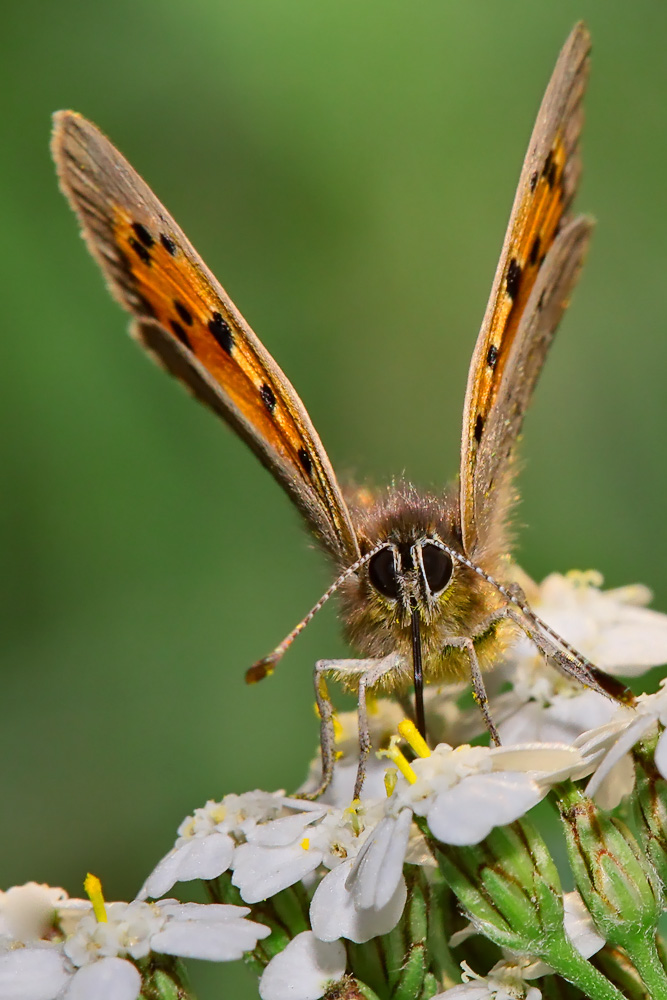
Germany

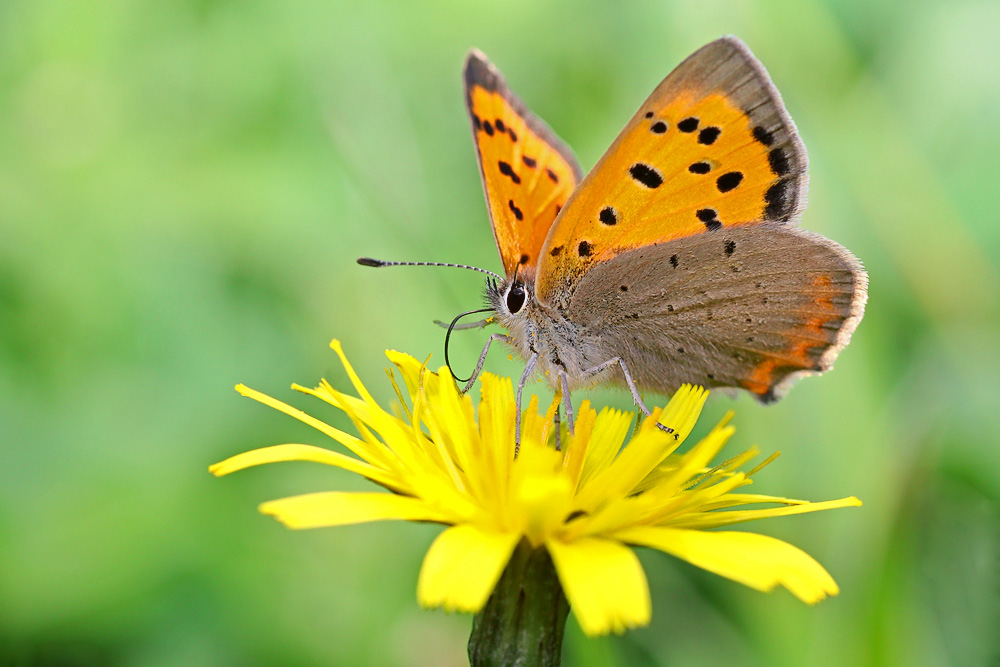
Germany

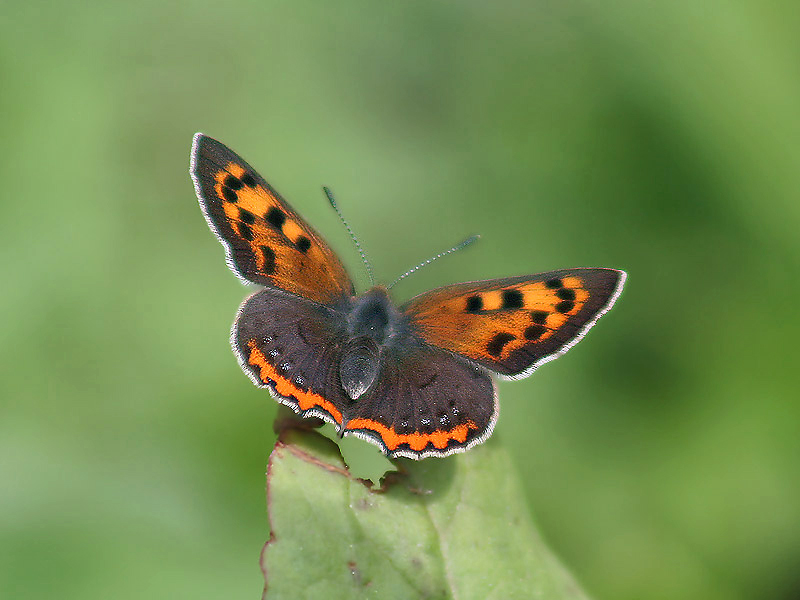

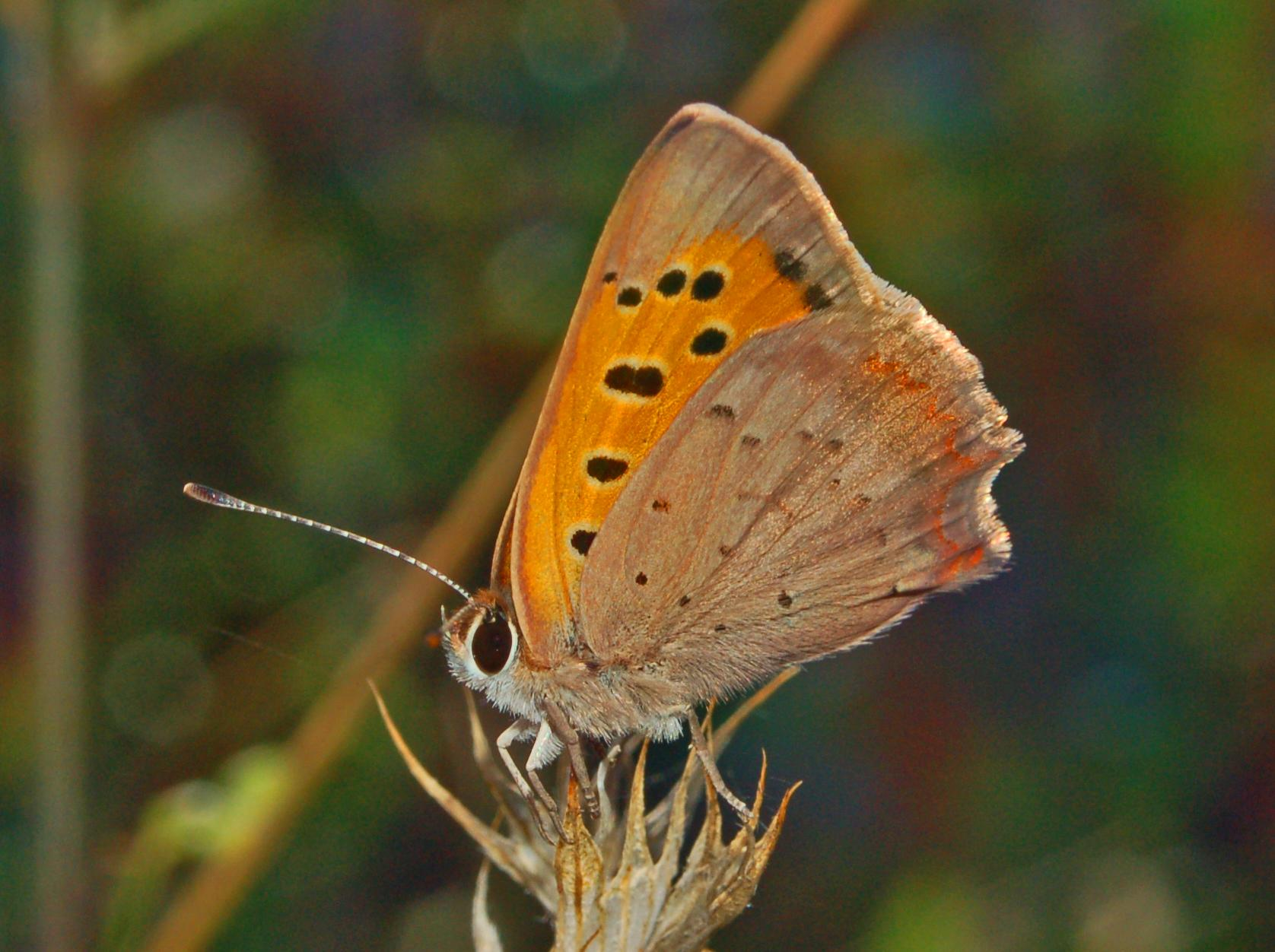

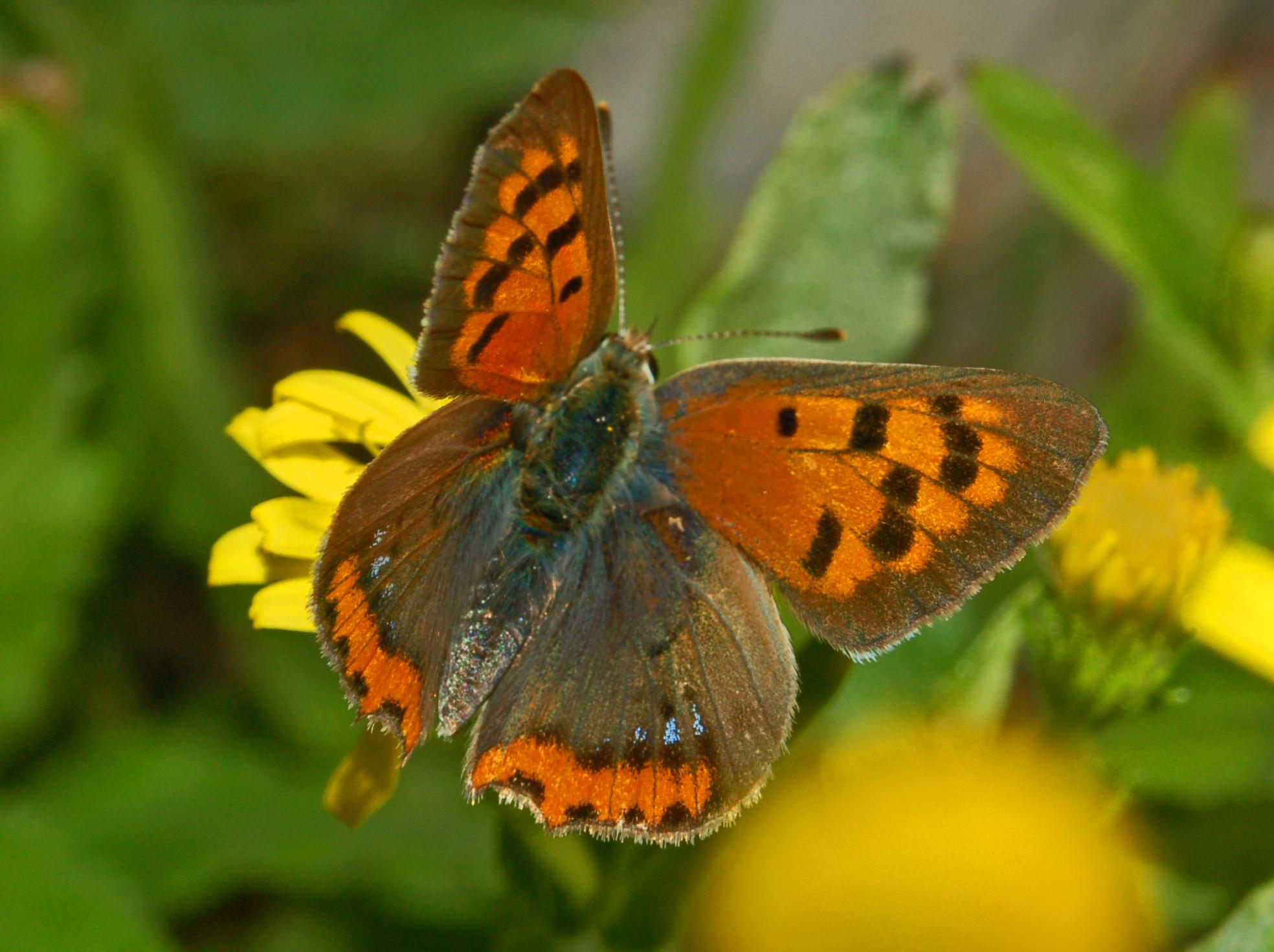

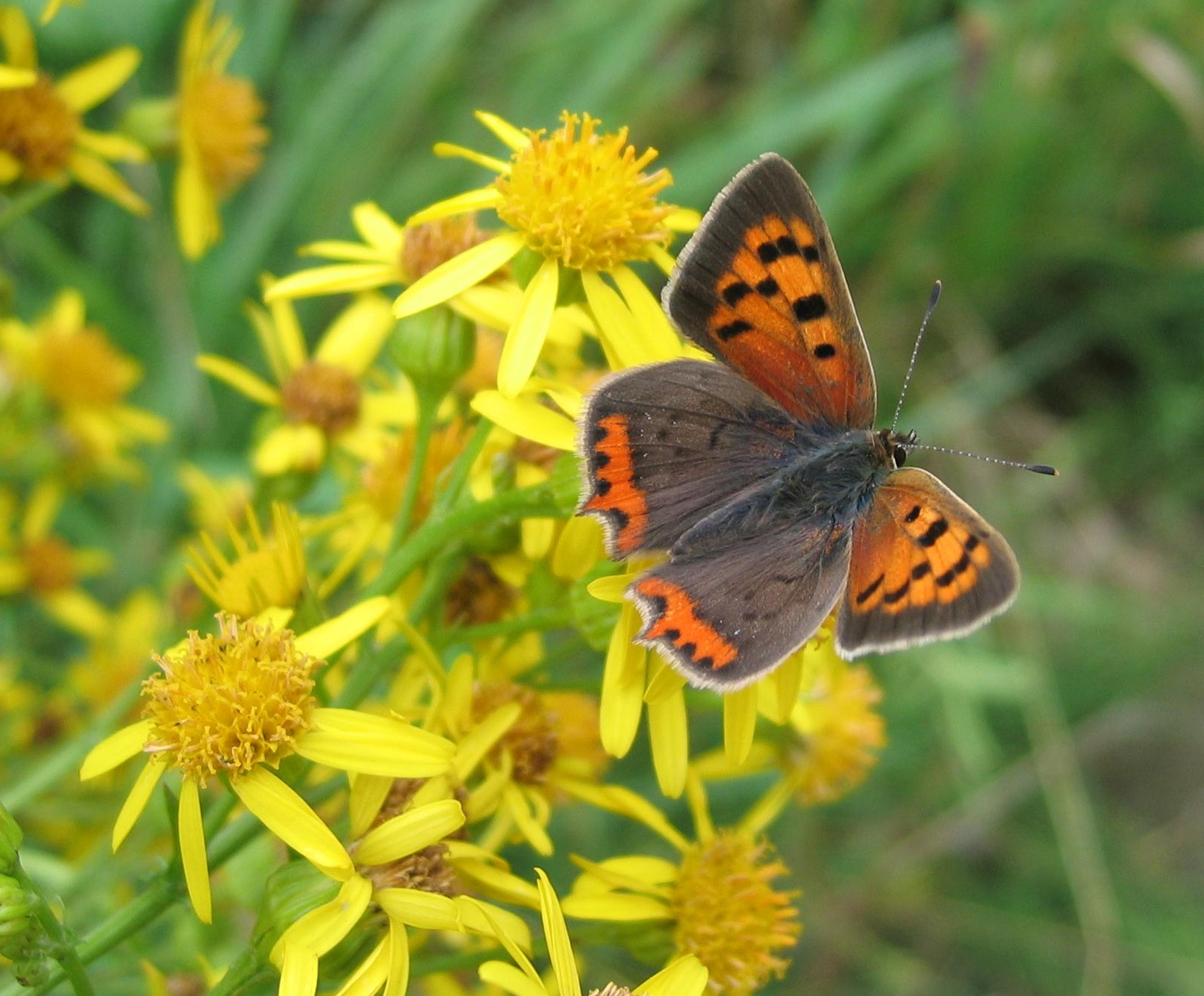
Subspecies phlaeas

In Tokyo, Japan

== See also ==
- List of butterflies of India
- List of butterflies of India (Lycaenidae)
- List of butterflies of Great Britain
