= Enteucha cyanochlora =

Scientific classification
- Domain: Eukaryota
- Kingdom: Animalia
- Phylum: Arthropoda
- Class: Insecta
- Order: Lepidoptera
- Family: Nepticulidae
- Genus: Enteucha
- Species: E. cyanochlora

Binomial name
- Enteucha cyanochlora (Meyrick, 1915)

Species of moth

Enteucha cyanochlora is a moth of the family Nepticulidae. It is only known from Guyana.
