= Enteucha diplocosma =

Scientific classification
- Domain: Eukaryota
- Kingdom: Animalia
- Phylum: Arthropoda
- Class: Insecta
- Order: Lepidoptera
- Family: Nepticulidae
- Genus: Enteucha
- Species: E. diplocosma

Binomial name
- Enteucha diplocosma (Meyrick, 1921)

Species of moth

Enteucha diplocosma is a moth of the family Nepticulidae. It was described by Edward Meyrick in 1921. It is known from Assam, India.
