= Neofriseria baungaardiella =

Scientific classification
- Kingdom: Animalia
- Phylum: Arthropoda
- Clade: Pancrustacea
- Class: Insecta
- Order: Lepidoptera
- Family: Gelechiidae
- Genus: Neofriseria
- Species: N. baungaardiella

Binomial name
- Neofriseria baungaardiella Huemer & Karsholt, 1999

Species of moth

Neofriseria baungaardiella is a moth of the family Gelechiidae. It was described by Peter Huemer and Ole Karsholt in 1999. It is found in Greece, southern Spain and Portugal.
