= Neofriseria pseudoterrella =

Scientific classification
- Domain: Eukaryota
- Kingdom: Animalia
- Phylum: Arthropoda
- Class: Insecta
- Order: Lepidoptera
- Family: Gelechiidae
- Genus: Neofriseria
- Species: N. pseudoterrella

Binomial name
- Neofriseria pseudoterrella (Rebel, 1928)

Synonyms
- Gelechia pseudoterrella Rebel, 1928

Species of moth

Neofriseria pseudoterrella is a moth of the family Gelechiidae. It was described by Rebel in 1928. It is found in Spain.

The wingspan is about 16 mm. The forewings are brownish with three ill-defined black spots.
