= Enteucha snaddoni =

Scientific classification
- Domain: Eukaryota
- Kingdom: Animalia
- Phylum: Arthropoda
- Class: Insecta
- Order: Lepidoptera
- Family: Nepticulidae
- Genus: Enteucha
- Species: E. snaddoni

Binomial name
- Enteucha snaddoni Puplesis & Robinson, 2000

Species of moth

Enteucha snaddoni is a moth of the family Nepticulidae. It was described by Puplesis and Robinson in 2000. It is known from Belize.
