= Neofriseria turkmeniella =

Scientific classification
- Kingdom: Animalia
- Phylum: Arthropoda
- Clade: Pancrustacea
- Class: Insecta
- Order: Lepidoptera
- Family: Gelechiidae
- Genus: Neofriseria
- Species: N. turkmeniella

Binomial name
- Neofriseria turkmeniella Piskunov, 1987

Species of moth

Neofriseria turkmeniella is a moth of the family Gelechiidae. It is found in the Uzbekistan, Turkmenistan, southern Kazakhstan and Tajikistan.

The larvae feed on Atraphaxis spinosa, Atraphaxis badghysi and Atraphaxis pyrifolia.
