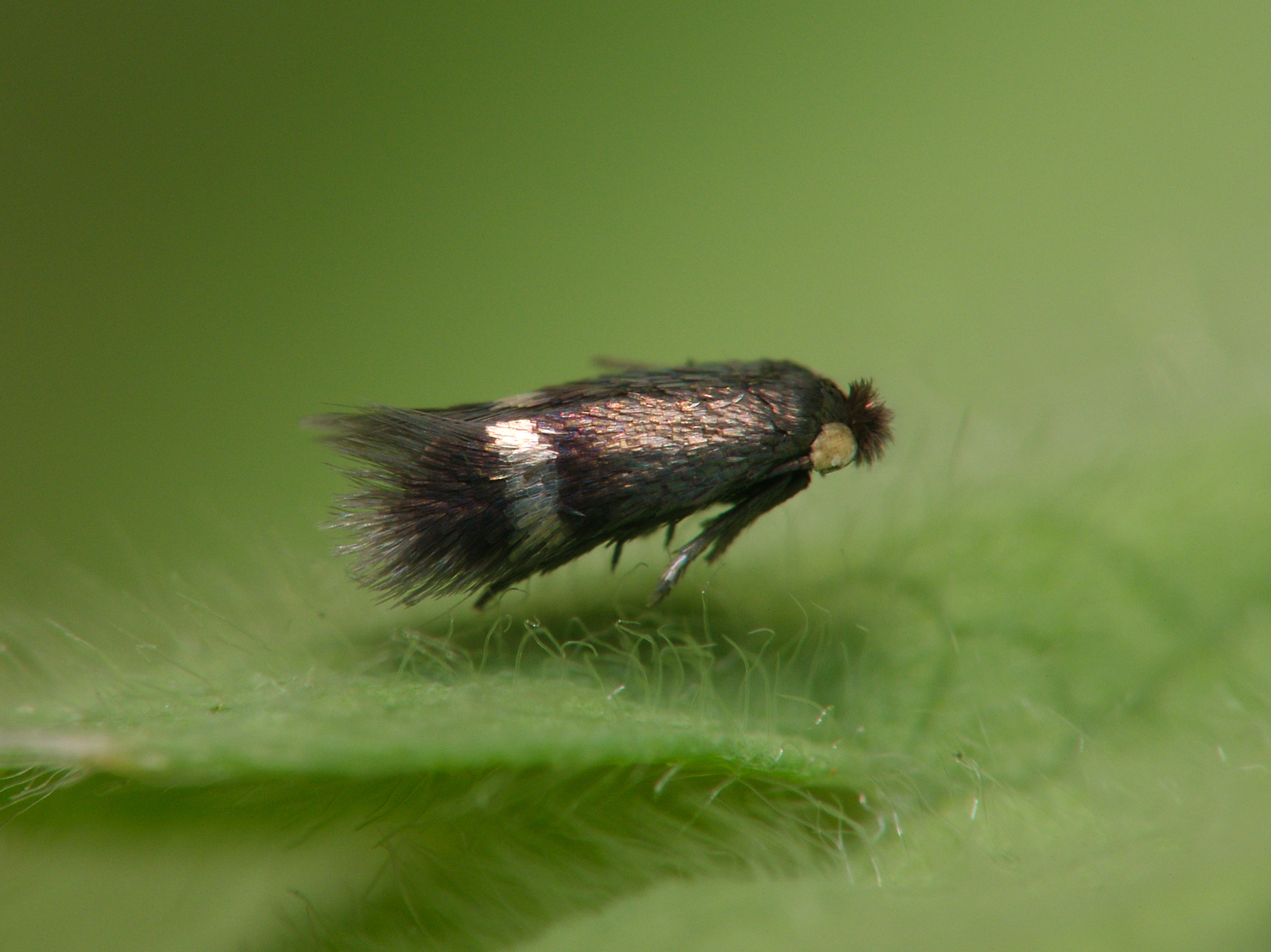
- Enteucha acetosae

Scientific classification
- Kingdom: Animalia
- Phylum: Arthropoda
- Class: Insecta
- Order: Lepidoptera
- Family: Nepticulidae
- Subfamily: Nepticulinae
- Genus: Enteucha; Meyrick, 1915

Synonyms
- List: Artaversala Davis, 1978; Oligoneura Davis, 1978 not Bigot, 1878; Manoneura Davis, 1979; Johanssonia Borkowski, 1972 not Selensky, 1914; Johanssoniella Kocak 1981 (replacement name for Johanssonia Borkowski)

= Enteucha =

Genus of moths

Enteucha is a genus of moths of the family Nepticulidae.

== Species ==
- Enteucha acetosae (Stainton, 1854)
- Enteucha acuta Puplesis & Diškus, 2002
- Enteucha basidactyla (Davis, 1978)
- Enteucha contracolorea Puplesis & Robinson, 2000
- Enteucha cyanochlora (Meyrick, 1915)
- Enteucha diplocosma (Meyrick, 1921)
- Enteucha gilvafascia (Davis, 1978)
- Enteucha guajavae Puplesis & Diškus, 2002
- Enteucha hilli Puplesis & Robinson, 2000
- Enteucha snaddoni Puplesis & Robinson, 2000
- Enteucha terricula Puplesis & Robinson, 2000
- Enteucha trinaria (Puplesis & Robinson, 2000)
