= Enteucha acuta =

Scientific classification
- Domain: Eukaryota
- Kingdom: Animalia
- Phylum: Arthropoda
- Class: Insecta
- Order: Lepidoptera
- Family: Nepticulidae
- Genus: Enteucha
- Species: E. acuta

Binomial name
- Enteucha acuta Puplesis & Diškus, 2002

Species of insect (moth)

Enteucha acuta is a moth of the family Nepticulidae. It is only known from the lowland Amazon rainforest in Ecuador.

The wingspan is 3.4–3.5 mm for males. It is known from a single adult collected in January 2001.
