= Neofriseria caucasicella =

Scientific classification
- Kingdom: Animalia
- Phylum: Arthropoda
- Class: Insecta
- Order: Lepidoptera
- Family: Gelechiidae
- Genus: Neofriseria
- Species: N. caucasicella

Binomial name
- Neofriseria caucasicella Sattler, 1960

Species of moth

Neofriseria caucasicella is a moth of the family Gelechiidae. It is found in the Caucasus and Moldavia. Records from Ukraine are based on misidentifications.

The larvae feed on Rumex species.
