= Neofriseria kuznetzovae =

Scientific classification
- Kingdom: Animalia
- Phylum: Arthropoda
- Class: Insecta
- Order: Lepidoptera
- Family: Gelechiidae
- Genus: Neofriseria
- Species: N. kuznetzovae

Binomial name
- Neofriseria kuznetzovae Bidzilya, 2002

Species of moth

Neofriseria kuznetzovae is a moth of the family Gelechiidae. It is found in Moldova, Ukraine and Russia (the southern Ural and southern Siberia: Altai, Tuva and Tomsk oblast).
