= Neofriseria sceptrophora =

Scientific classification
- Kingdom: Animalia
- Phylum: Arthropoda
- Class: Insecta
- Order: Lepidoptera
- Family: Gelechiidae
- Genus: Neofriseria
- Species: N. sceptrophora

Binomial name
- Neofriseria sceptrophora (Meyrick, 1926)

Synonyms
- Gelechia sceptrophora Meyrick, 1926; Gelechia suppeliella Walsingham, 1896

Species of moth

Neofriseria sceptrophora is a moth of the family Gelechiidae. It is found in Afghanistan and Turkey.

The wingspan is about 9 mm. The forewings are ochreous-whitish, rather thinly irrorated (speckled) fuscous and with a small black linear dot beneath the costa near the base. The stigmata are large and blackish, the plical obliquely before the first discal, connected with the base by a strong blackish streak. There are a few black scales scattered along the posterior costal and terminal edge. The hindwings are pale greyish.
