= Nicola Onorati =

Italian agronomist and naturalist

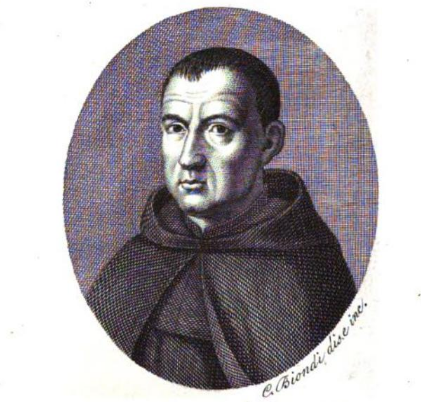
Portrait of Onorati

Nicola Onorati who sometimes wrote under the pseudonym Columella (26 August 1764 – 11 January 1822) was an Italian agronomist and naturalist.

He was born Gaetano Niccola Bartolomeo Onorati in Craco in Lucania (province of Basilicata) to a family of limited means. His intelligence garnered him an education and by age 20 he had entered the Franciscan order of observant minorites in Principato, and was sent as a novitiate to a seminary of Bologna. There he took classes under Ireneo Affo, with whom he kept a lifelong friendship. At age 26, he was a teacher in philosophy at Bologna, and received a position in his native town to teach theology. He was affiliated by 1786 with the Monastery of Montuoro. Dedicated to agriculture, by 1788 he was appointed to a professorship of agronomy for ten years at the University of Salerno. Subsequently, he had a position of teacher at the military academy of the Nunziatella in Naples, and professor of agriculture at the University of Naples. In 1798, he was named rector of the church of the San Diego all'Ospedaletto, and later director of its botanical garden. He was murdered by two of his domestic workers, intent on robbing him.

== Works ==
- Delle cose rustiche (1791, Naples)
- Memorie sopra l'agricoltura, che fanno seguito alle cose rustiche (1791, Naples)
- Dell'agricoltura pratica, dlla pastorizia e di molte altre dottrine che riguardano la medicina veterinaria e l'economia domestica (1813, Milan)
- Opuscoli Georgici (1820, Naples)
- Memorie sul miglioramento de' vini naploetani
- Memorie sopra in vinacciuoli e sul modo d'estrarne l'olio
- Saggio di economia campestre e domestica per i dodici mesi dell'anno, ad uso degli agricoltori, de'pastori e di altra gente industriosa (1816, Milan)
- Delle patate, loro coltura, uso economico e maniera di farne il pane
- Dell'educazione de'bachi da seta
- Dell'arte di governare i bachi da seta
- Dizionario di voci dubbie italiane
