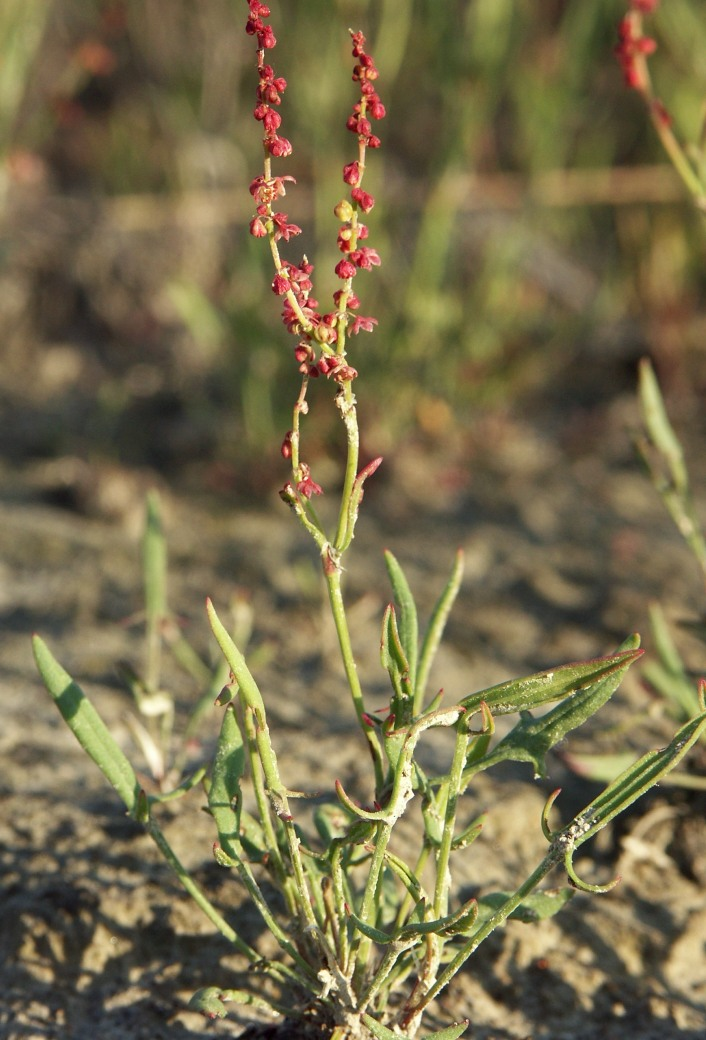

Scientific classification
- Kingdom: Plantae
- Clade: Embryophytes
- Clade: Tracheophytes
- Clade: Spermatophytes
- Clade: Angiosperms
- Clade: Eudicots
- Order: Caryophyllales
- Family: Polygonaceae
- Genus: Rumex
- Species: R. acetosella

Binomial name
- Rumex acetosella L.

Synonyms
- Acetosella vulgaris (W.D.J. Koch) Fourr.

= Rumex acetosella =

Species of flowering plant

Rumex acetosella, commonly known as red sorrel, sheep's sorrel, field sorrel and sour weed, is a species of flowering plant in the buckwheat family Polygonaceae. Native to Eurasia including the British Isles, the plant and its subspecies are common perennial weeds. It has green arrowhead-shaped leaves and red-tinted deeply ridged stems, and it sprouts from an aggressive and spreading rhizome. The flowers emerge from a tall, upright stem. Female flowers are maroon in color.

== Description ==
Rumex acetosella is a perennial herb which spreads via rhizomes. It has a slender and reddish, upright stem that is branched at the top, reaching a height of 50 centimetres (20 inches). The arrow-shaped leaves are small, about 2.4–5 cm (1–2 in) long and .5–2 cm (1/4–3/4 in) wide, with pointed lobes at the base. It blooms during March to November, when yellowish-green (male) or reddish (female) flowers develop on separate plants at the apex of the stem, which develop into the red fruits (achenes).

It should not be confused with the similarly named R. acerosella, which also contains oxalic acid and should not be eaten in excess.

=== Names ===
Rumex acetosella is frequently known by the common name sheep sorrel or sheep's sorrel, however species of Oxalis are also somewhat indiscriminately called by this name.

== Distribution and habitat ==
Native to Eurasia and the British Isles, R. acetosella has been introduced to most of the rest of the Northern Hemisphere. It is commonly found on acidic, sandy soils in heaths and grassland. It is often one of the first species to take hold in disturbed areas, such as abandoned mining sites, especially if the soil is acidic.

The plant is dioecious, with separate male and female plants. It has been found that in early successional habitats, there are relatively more female plants, while in later successional stages, male plants are more common.

The plant has been found as an invasive species in Sphagnum peatlands disturbed by peat extraction in southern Patagonia.

== Ecology ==
Livestock will graze on the plant, but it is not very nutritious and is toxic in large amounts because of oxalates. Italian agronomist Nicola Onorati (1764–1822) first discovered that the plant damages the teeth of animals that crop this plant because of the oxalic acid it contains.

Ground-feeding songbirds eat the seeds, and larger animals like rabbits and deer browse the greens.

The American copper or small copper butterfly depends on it for food, although its larvae can consume some related plants.

Some species of fungi live on Rumex acetosella, including the pathogenic species Mycosphaerella polygonorum, Pleospora herbarum and the imperfect fungus Rhabdospora pleosporoides.

The plant is widely considered to be a hard-to-control noxious weed due to its spreading rhizome. Blueberry farmers are familiar with the weed because it thrives in the same conditions under which blueberries are cultivated.

== Toxicity ==
The plant contains oxalic acid and derivatives, known as oxalates.

== Uses ==
The leaves can be eaten raw or cooked, with the water changed to reduce its strong taste. The oxalic acid they contain lend them a somewhat sour taste. There are several uses of sheep sorrel in the preparation of food including a garnish, a tart flavoring agent, a salad green, and a curdling agent for milk in cheese-making. The leaves have a lemony, tangy or rhubarb-like tart flavor.
