= Salta (disambiguation) =

Salta is a city in Argentina.

Salta may also refer to:

== Places ==
- Salta Province, Argentina, whose capital is the namesake city
- Salta, Bangladesh, a town in Bangladesh
- Salta, Cumbria, a hamlet in England
- Salta, Republic of Dagestan, a rural locality in Russia
- Sâlța, a tributary of the Iza in Maramureș County, Romania
- Sâlța, a village in Rozavlea Commune, Maramureș County, Romania

== Music ==
- "Salta" (song), by the Argentinian artist King Africa
- "Salta!!", a song by the Argentine-Spanish band Tequila
- Tom Salta, American composer

== Ships ==
- Salta, name of HMS Shah (D21) after conversion and sale into civilian service; participated in the rescue of passengers of the luxury cruise ship Lakonia
- HMHS Salta, a hospital ship sunk by a mine during the First World War
- Several ships of the Argentine Navy

== Other uses ==
- Battle of Salta, fought during the Argentine War of Independence
- Salta Open, a golf tournament on the TPG tour in Argentina
- Salta (game), a two-player abstract strategy board game
- Salta (plant), a genus of flowering plants
