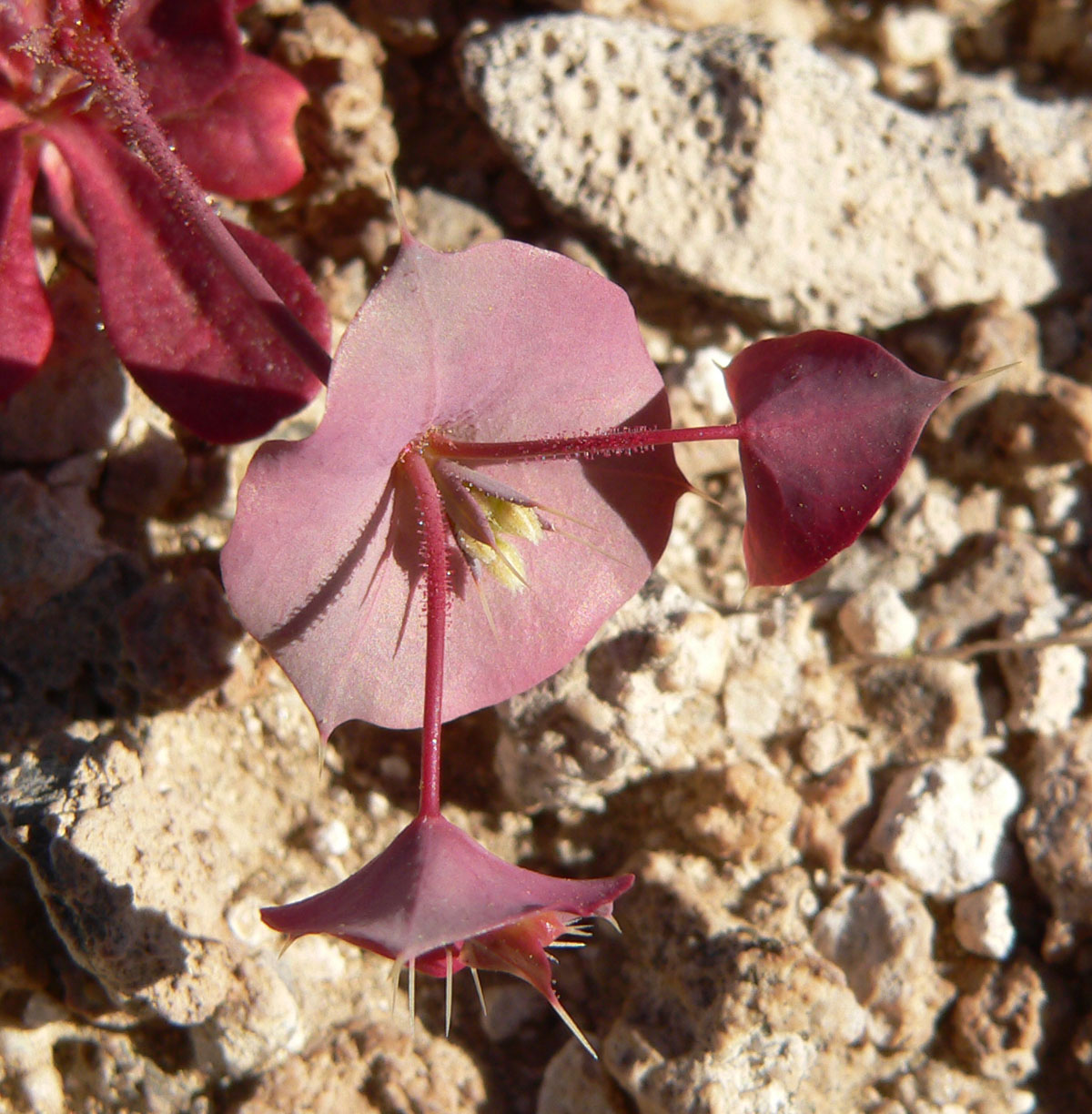

Scientific classification
- Kingdom: Plantae
- Clade: Tracheophytes
- Clade: Angiosperms
- Clade: Eudicots
- Order: Caryophyllales
- Family: Polygonaceae
- Genus: Oxytheca
- Species: O. perfoliata

Binomial name
- Oxytheca perfoliata Torr. & A.Gray

= Oxytheca perfoliata =

Species of flowering plant

Oxytheca perfoliata is a species of flowering plant in the buckwheat family known by the common names round-leaf puncturebract and roundleaf oxytheca. It is native to the southwestern United States, where it is a common plant of the deserts and some woodland and valley areas. It is an annual herb producing a leafless stem up to about 20 centimeters in maximum height in the spring; during the winter the plant is a small rosette of oblong or spoon-shaped leaves a few centimeters wide. The plant is red-veined green, or often brown to maroon or magenta in color. The inflorescence atop the stem is punctuated by nodes at which the bracts are fused to form a cup or band up to about 2.5 centimeters wide. At the end of each branching of the stem is a similar cup of bracts partially fused around a cluster of flowers. The bracts are tipped in spinelike awns. The flowers are white to yellow-green and hairy in texture.
