= Woollyheads =

Woollyheads is a common name for several plants and may refer to:

- Craspedia, also known as billybuttons
- Nemacaulis, also known as cottonheads
- Psilocarphus
