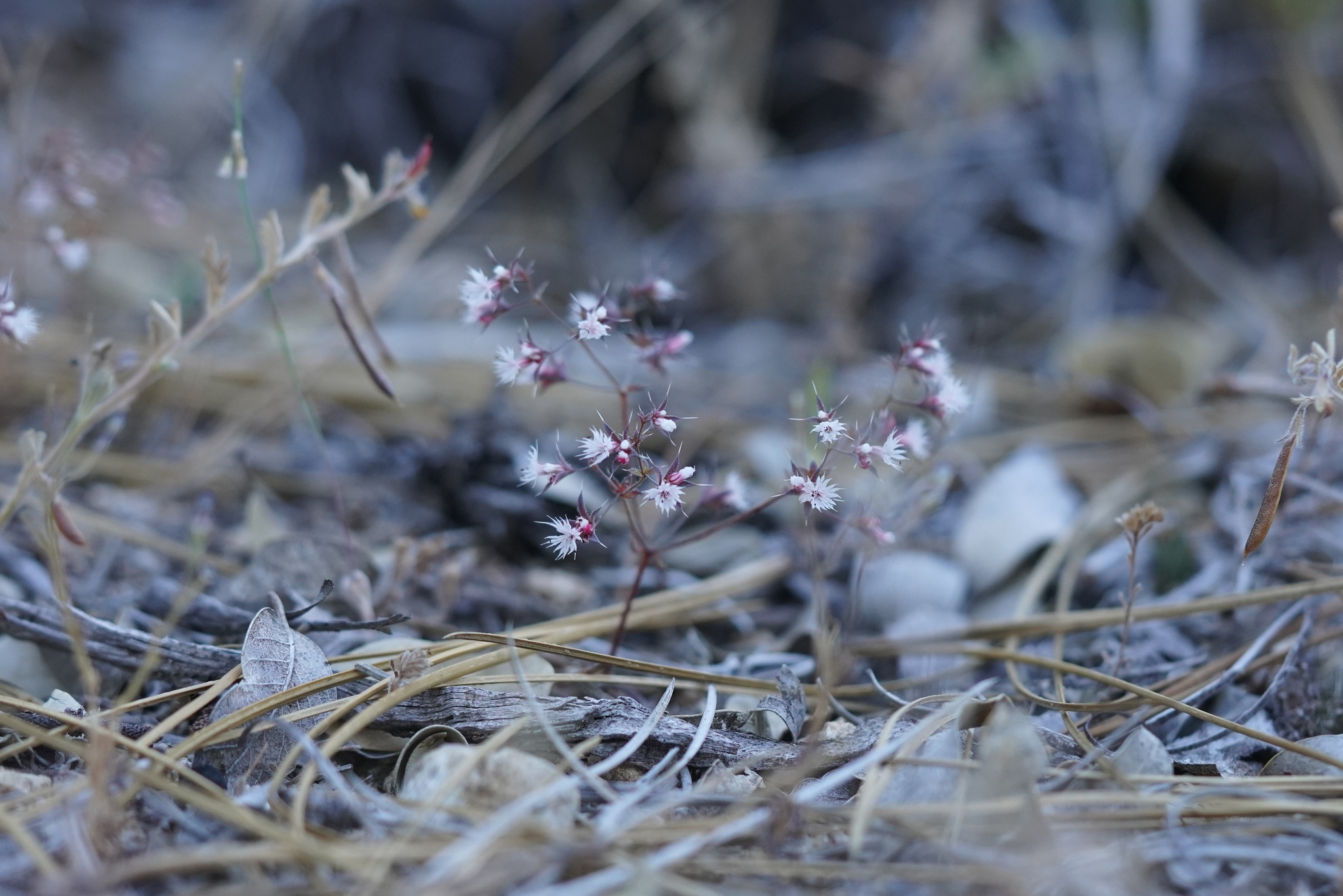
- Sidotheca trilobata in the San Gabriel Mountains of California

Scientific classification
- Kingdom: Plantae
- Clade: Embryophytes
- Clade: Tracheophytes
- Clade: Spermatophytes
- Clade: Angiosperms
- Clade: Eudicots
- Order: Caryophyllales
- Family: Polygonaceae
- Genus: Sidotheca; Reveal

= Sidotheca =

Genus of flowering plants

Sidotheca, commonly known as starry puncturebract, is a genus of flowering plants belonging to the family Polygonaceae. It comprises three species, all of which are annuals that grow in rocky, montane habitats in California and northwestern Mexico. These species were previously placed in the genus Oxytheca, but Sidotheca has been treated as a distinct genus since 2004.

== Description ==
Sidotheca are small, annual herbs growing from a slender taproot. The stem is usually spreading or prostrate but may less commonly be erect in S. trilobata. The basal leaves are arranged in a rosette and sometimes wither before the rest of the plant. At the end of the stem, the inflorescence is arranged as a cyme, with many branches.

Flowering occurs from February to August in Sidotheca emarginata, from June to September in S. caryophylloides, and from April to September in S. trilobata. Each flower is held by a funnel-shaped involucre with five or six pointed teeth with needle-like tips. The involucres hold 2–5 (or sometimes up to 10) flowers, which are funnel-shaped and have six tepals. Each tepal has 3–4 deeply-cut lobes, a trait that is unique among other closely-related genera in the subfamily Eriogonoideae. The flowers have nine stamens with red or maroon anthers.

Each fruit, called an achene, is brown, glabrous, and obconic, with a wide top and narrow base. Each achene holds a single, curved seed. The chromosome number is x = 20.

== Taxonomy ==
=== Accepted species ===
There are three accepted species in the genus Sidotheca:

- Sidotheca caryophylloides (Parry) Reveal – chickweed starry puncturebract
- Sidotheca emarginata (H.M.Hall) Reveal – white-margin starry puncturebract
- Sidotheca trilobata (A.Gray) Reveal – three-lobed starry puncturebract

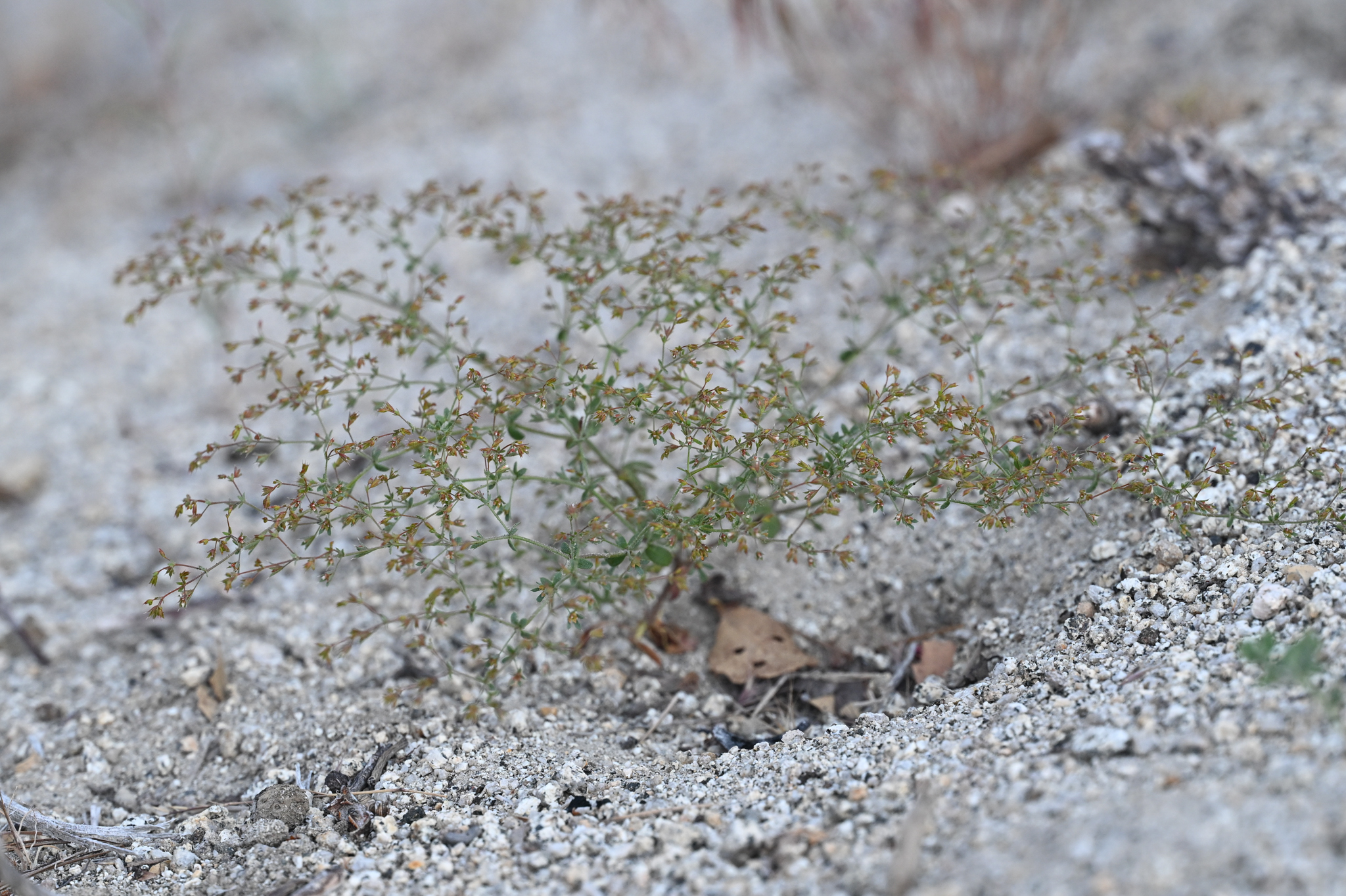
Sidotheca caryophylloides in bloom in Riverside County, California

=== Historical treatments of the genus ===
The species currently composing Sidotheca were all first described as species in the genus Oxytheca. In her 1980 revision of Oxytheca, Barbara Ertter noted that O. caryophylloides, O. emarginata, and O. trilobata formed a closely-related group that differed significantly from other members of the genus, particularly in their lobed tepals. She therefore placed them in a separate section, named Neoxytheca after an unpublished generic name for the group used by George J. Goodman. In 2004, botanist James L. Reveal segregated these taxa into the newly-described genus Sidotheca, arguing that they had arisen from different evolutionary lineages than the species in Oxytheca sensu stricto. A 2012 phylogenetic study of the subfamily Eriogonoideae supported treating Sidotheca as its own genus, finding that it is monophyletic. Taxonomic authorities including Plants of the World Online, Flora of North America, and The Jepson Manual now accept Sidotheca as a distinct genus comprising the three species listed above.

The name Sidotheca comes from the Greek words sidus (meaning star) and theke (meaning case), referring to the starlike involucres that subtend the flowers.

== Distribution ==
Species in the genus Sidotheca are native to southern California and northwestern Mexico. The most widespread of the species is S. trilobata, which grows through the Transverse Ranges and southward into Baja California at elevations of 700–2100 m. The other two species grow are endemic to California: S. caryophylloides grows in the Transverse Ranges and the southern Sierra Nevada at elevations of 1300–2600 m, and S. emarginata is endemic to Riverside County, California, where it grows in the San Jacinto Mountains and Santa Rosa Mountains at elevations of 1200–2500 m.

== Ecology and conservation ==
All three species of Sidotheca belong to montane chaparral communities and conifer forests, where they grow in rocky, gravelly, and sandy soils. Among them, Sidotheca trilobata is especially common in areas that have recently burned.

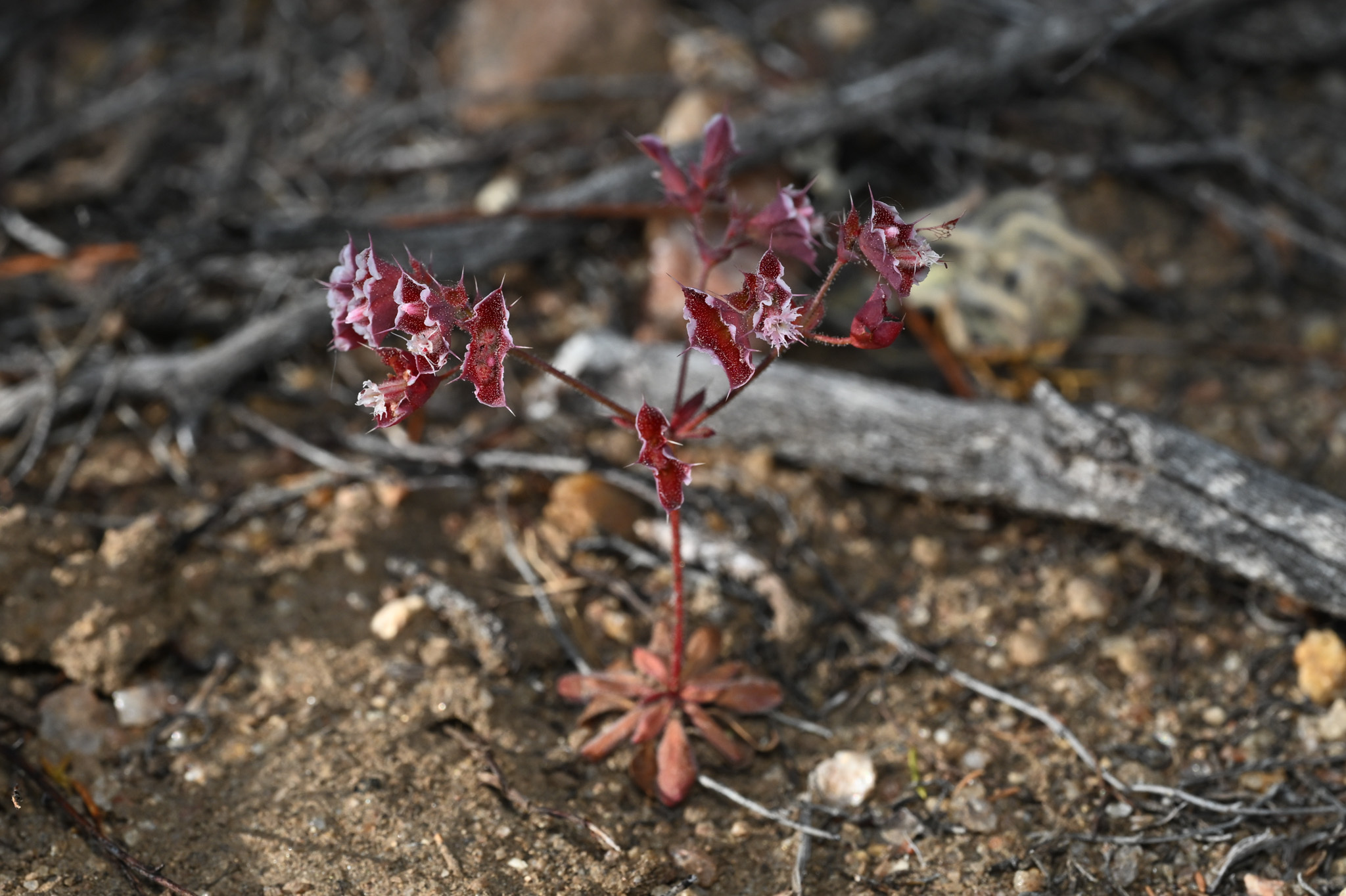
Sidotheca emarginata in bloom in Riverside County, California

Little is known about the pollination biology of Sidotheca species. In 1980, Barbara Ertter noted that no insect visitors to the flowers of S. emarginata, which are among the showiest in the genus, had been observed, and it was not known whether the plant outcrossed or was mostly self-fertile.

While Sidotheca trilobata and S. caryophylloides are considered secure, S. emarginata is listed as a vulnerable species by NatureServe.
