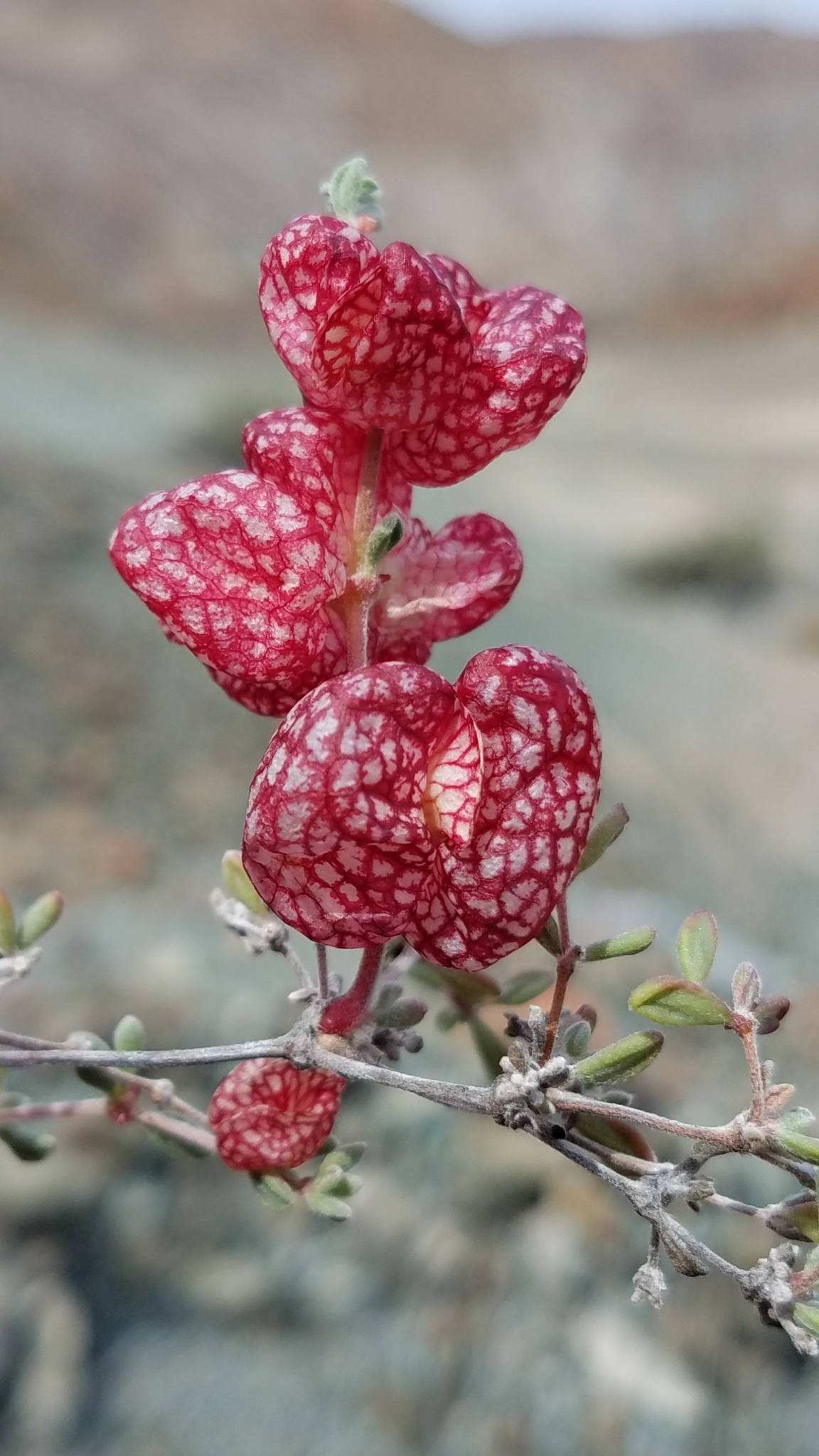

Scientific classification
- Kingdom: Plantae
- Clade: Tracheophytes
- Clade: Angiosperms
- Clade: Eudicots
- Order: Caryophyllales
- Family: Polygonaceae
- Subfamily: Eriogonoideae
- Tribe: Eriogoneae
- Genus: Harfordia; Greene & Parry
- Species: H. macroptera

Binomial name
- Harfordia macroptera (Benth.) Greene & Parry

= Harfordia macroptera =

Rabbit's purse

Genus of flowering plants

Harfordia macroptera is a woody perennial in the family Polygonaceae commonly known as rabbit's purse. It is the sole species in the genus Harfordia, which is endemic to the Baja California Peninsula. This plant is characterized by a unique, conspicuous bladder embellished with red to purple veins that surround the fruit. The sac-like structure is actually a dramatically modified bract, and assists in dispersal of the seeds through the wind.

== Description ==
This sprawling to spreading shrub or subshrub is characterized by its conspicuous and colorful sac-like bracts that aid in dispersal of the achene. Plants may be monoecious but are more commonly dioecious. This species may not be immediately obvious in habitat until their inflated bracts are fully expanded.

=== Morphology ===
This plant has numerous slender to stout stems that arise from a woody taproot. The leaves are cauline, opposite, with the leaf blades shaped linear to oblanceolate to obovate-spatulate. The leaves may be glabrous or pubescent with slightly curled hairs. The leaves are thin to thick-ish and more or less succulent.

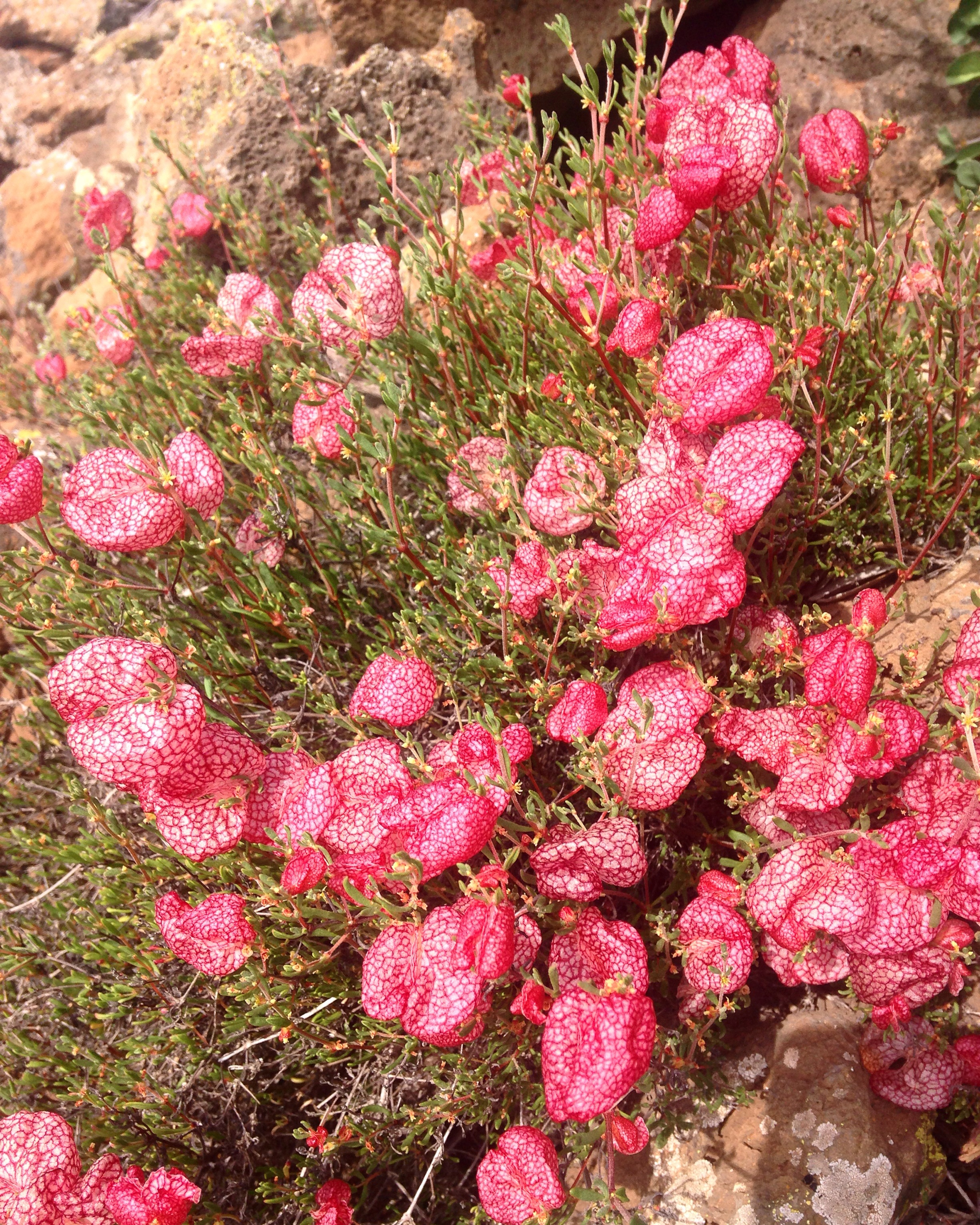
In habitat

The inflorescences have flowers borne in axillary clusters, or on perfect (Note: A "perfect" flower contains both male and female organs.) or female plants, on short, stout peduncles. The peduncles are 0.7 to 2 cm long, and are usually densely pubescent. The involucres are lacking in male plants, and in perfect or female plants the involucre is reduced to a highly modified bract. This highly modified bract is a sac or bladder-like structure that enlarges with development of the flower, colored hyaline and textured with deep red to red-purple veins, and lacking hairs.

The flowers are either imperfect (Note: An "imperfect" flower contains either male or female organs.) or perfect, with the 6 tepals monomorphic and shaped lanceolate. The male flowers are pale yellow, smaller than the female ones, and have an occasionally have an aborted ovary. The female flowers are initially pale yellow but become red to rose, and always have aborted stamens. The perfect flowers are pale yellow to rose. There are 9 stamens, with those on the male flowers slightly protruding on elongated filaments that bear yellow oval anthers, while those on the female flower on minute filaments bearing small aborted anthers.

The fruit is an achene, 3 to 5 mm long, colored yellowish-brown to brown.

== Taxonomy ==
=== Classification ===
The first plants discovered were initially described as being in the genus Pterostegia. However, upon realization that Pterostegia macroptera was a woody perennial, unlike the type species Pterostegia drymarioides (which was an annual), and that the large, inflated bracts were unique, Edward Lee Greene and Charles C. Parry established the genus Harfordia, placing within it Harfordia macroptera, Harfordia galioides and the Cedros Island endemic Harfordia fruticosa.

Ira Loren Wiggins only accounted for H. macroptera in his flora of the Sonoran Desert, citing Pterostegia galioides as a synonym and disposing of H. fruticosa due to his exclusion of Cedros Island endemics. James L. Reveal took into account the three distinct entities Greene had described (galioides, fruticosa and macroptera), and opted to place them as varieties within a monospecific genus. His basis for separation was that the varieties were primarily allopatric, only overlapping in one small area in northwestern Baja California Sur. Where the plants overlap, a series of morphological intermediates between them are found.

=== Varieties ===
Although the three varieties are weakly defined morphologically, they are geographically distinct. They are:

- Harfordia macroptera var. galioides (Vizcaino rabbit's purse) – A large and often sprawling shrub that is 30 to 60 cm tall and 40 to 80 cm across. The leaves are shaped linear to narrowly oblanceolate, and are 0.8 to 2 cm long, and 0.5 to 2 mm wide, hairy with slightly curled hairs. The sac-like bract is 2 to 3 cm across at maturity. Chromosome count is n = 20. This variety is uncommonly distributed from San Vicente in northwestern Baja California to the Vizcaino Peninsula of northern Baja California Sur.
- Harfordia macroptera var. fruticosa (Cedros rabbit's purse) – A large sprawling shrub that is 10 to 30 cm tall and 20 to 40 cm across. The leaves are broadly oblanceolate to obovate-spatulate, and are 0.2 to 0.8 cm long, and 2 to 4 mm wide, lacking hairs and thick and succulent. The sac-like bract is 1 to 2 cm across at maturity. This species is endemic to Cedros Island off of the coast of Baja California.
- Harfordia macroptera var. macroptera (Magdalena rabbit's purse) – A large sprawling shrub that is 20 to 40 cm tall and 40 to 60 cm across. The leaves are broadly oblanceolate to spatulate, and 0.5 to 1.5 cm long, 2 to 6 mm wide, lacking hairs, and thick and succulent. The sac-like bract is 1 to 2 cm across at maturity. This species is common on gravelly soil in the Magdalena Bay region and surrounding islands in Baja California Sur.

== Phenology ==
The characteristic bladder or sac-like structure that surrounds the achene originally starts as a tiny immature bract subtending the pedicel. The bract is initially reflexed and composed of three individual segments that only join each other at the point of attachment. As the bract matures, it enlarges and the forms a sheath around the pedicel. As soon as the flower inside is fertilized, the bract rapidly expands upward and outwards. Eventually, the whole structure completely overtops and encompasses the achene. The two laminar sides of the bract continue to expand to form the conspicuous bladder-like portion of the bract.

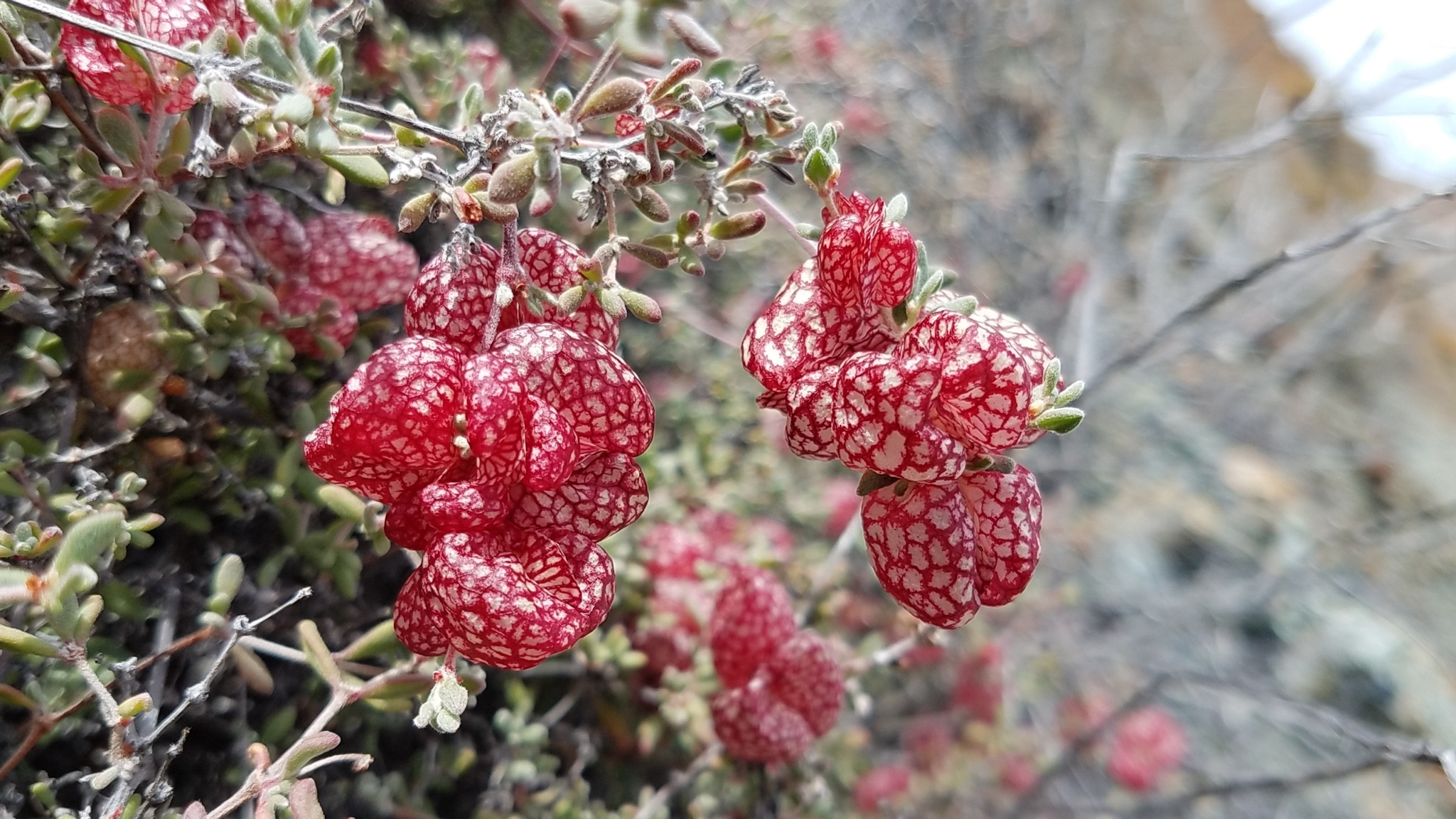
The red to purple veined sacs are actually modified bracts, which help in transporting the seeds via the wind.

The modified bract is hypothesized to aid in the dispersal of the achene. The inflated and papery bract is easily detached and blow through the wind, with the achene inside. This leaves the fully mature achene within able to be readily transported. The bract does dry, but as it is filled with veins, it does not simply disintegrate. Even after detachment, rain can re-inflate and move with the help of the winds associated with thunderstorms. The achene can remain with the bracts for up to two to three years.
