= Charles Frederick Millspaugh =

American bonanist and physician (1854–1923)

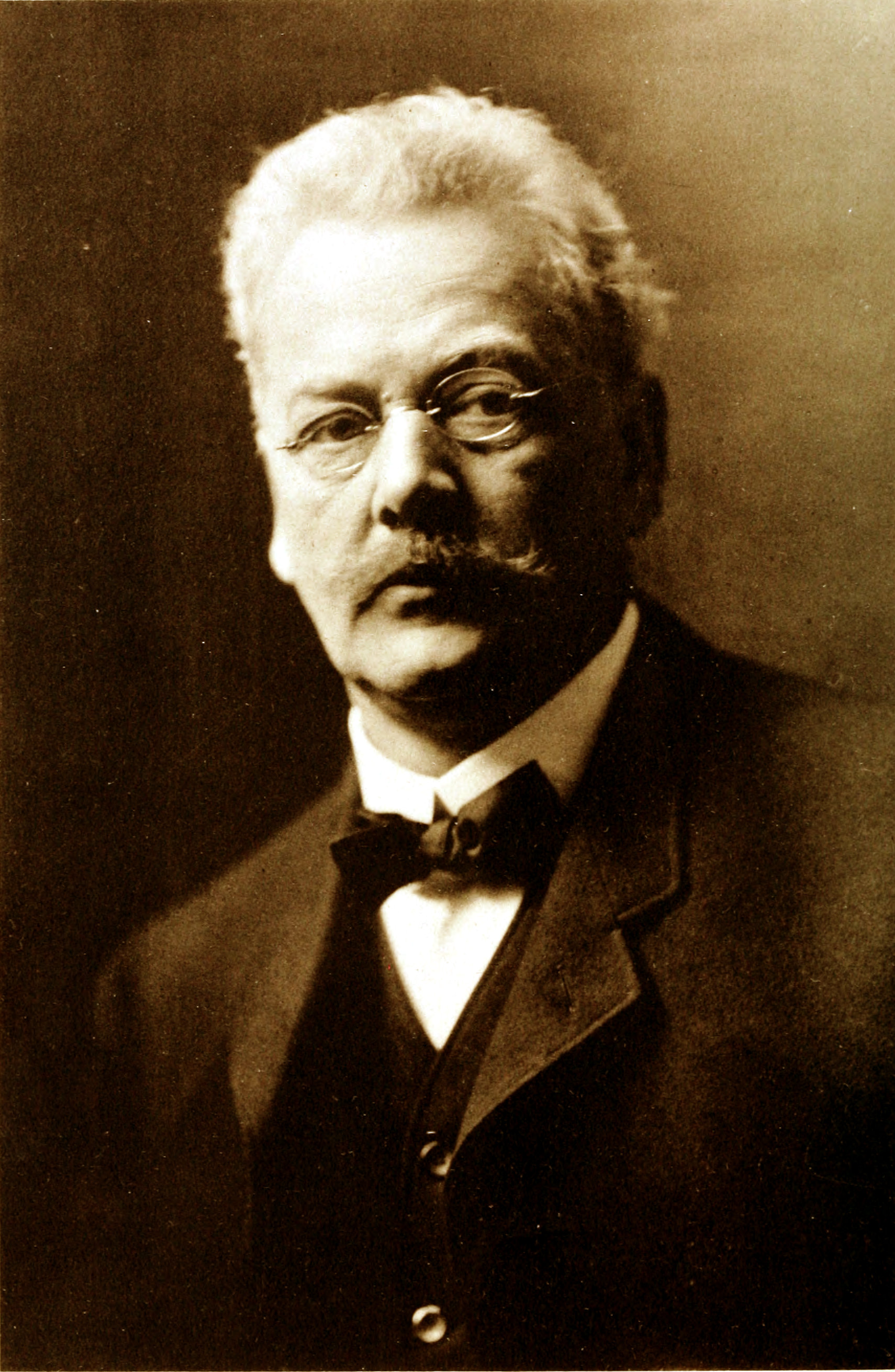
- Born: June 20, 1854; Ithaca, New York, US
- Died: September 15, 1923 (aged 69); Chicago, Illinois, US
- Education: Cornell University, New York Homeopathic Medical College
- Scientific career
- Fields: Botany, medicine, illustration
- Workplaces: West Virginia University, Field Museum of Natural History, Chicago Homeopathic Medical College, University of Chicago
- Author abbrev. (botany): Millsp.

Charles Frederick Millspaugh (June 20, 1854 – September 15, 1923) was an American botanist, botanical illustrator, and physician. He was the founding curator of botany at the Field Museum of Natural History from 1897 until his death, where he was instrumental in collecting and organizing the museum's vast botanical collections.

== Life and career ==
Millspaugh was born in Ithaca, New York, on June 20, 1854. He was a nephew of Ezra Cornell, founder of Cornell University. Millspaugh attended Cornell from 1872 to 1875 and then New York Homeopathic Medical College, earning his medical degree in 1881. He practiced medicine in Binghamton, New York, until 1890. Drawn to botany since a chance meeting in his youth with Louis Agassiz, he decided to change careers.

From 1891 to 1892, Millspaugh taught botany at West Virginia University. In 1894 he was appointed as the newly established Field Museum of Natural History's first Curator of Botany, a position he held until his death. He collected and indexed the museum's vast botanical collections. From 1897 to 1923 he served as professor of medical botany at the Chicago Homeopathic Medical College. He also taught botany at the University of Chicago, first as a lecturer in 1895 and later as associate professor of economic botany. He was a fellow of the American Association for the Advancement of Science (AAAS) and a member of the Torrey Botanical Society and the Explorers Club.

Millspaugh conducted explorations throughout the United States and Mexico, the West Indies, Brazil, and other parts of South America. He wrote and illustrated the magisterial American Medicinal Plants (1887), published in ten volumes with 180 full-color plates that he painted himself. He also wrote Flora of West Virginia (1896), Contribution I–III to the Coastal and Plain Flora of Yucatán (1895–1898), Flora of Santa Catalina Island (1923), and many articles in scientific and popular journals. He was a skilled scientific illustrator and artist, producing the majority of the illustrations for his publications.

The genera Millspaughia B.L.Rob. and Neomillspaughia S.F.Blake (Polygonaceae) were named in his honor.

== See also ==
- List of botanists by author abbreviation
