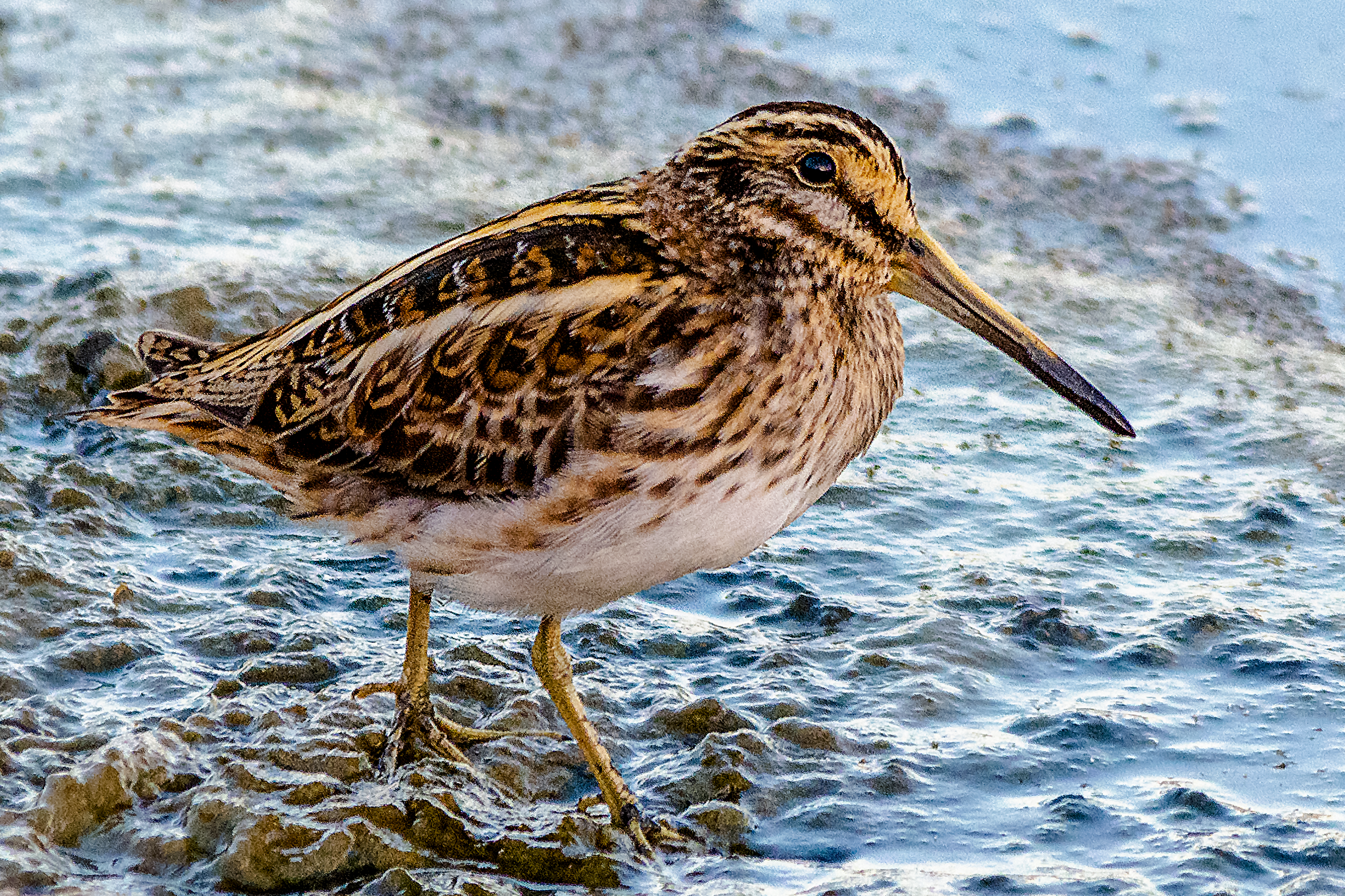

Conservation status
- Least Concern (IUCN 3.1)

Scientific classification
- Kingdom: Animalia
- Phylum: Chordata
- Class: Aves
- Order: Charadriiformes
- Family: Scolopacidae
- Genus: Lymnocryptes; F. Boie, 1826
- Species: L. minimus

Binomial name
- Lymnocryptes minimus (Brünnich, 1764)
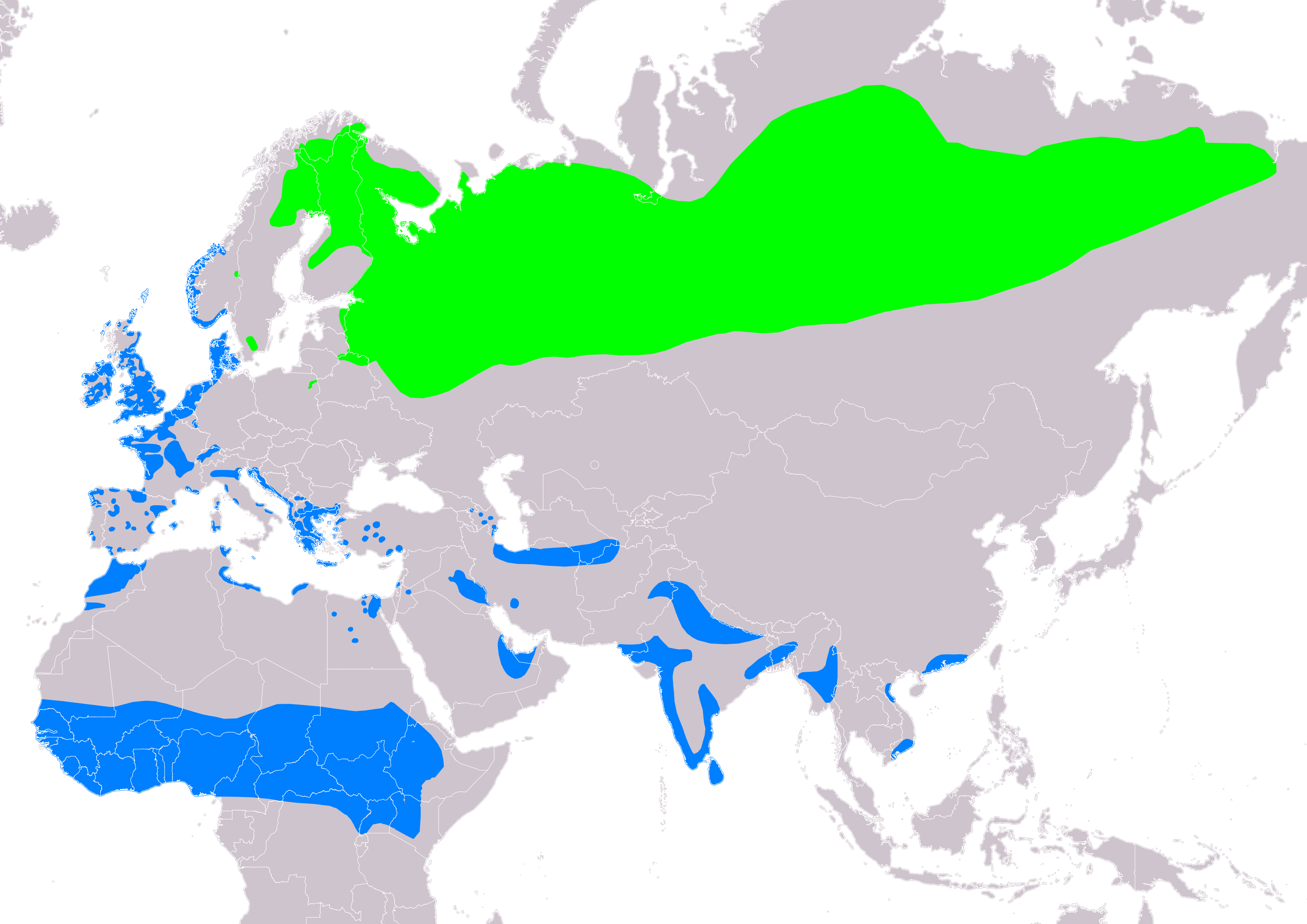
- Range of L. minimus Breeding Non-breeding

Synonyms
- Scolopax minima Brünnich, 1764

= Jack snipe =

Species of bird

The jack snipe or jacksnipe (Lymnocryptes minimus) is a small stocky wader. It is the smallest snipe, and the only member of the genus Lymnocryptes. Features such as its sternum and its continuous 'bobbing up and down' make it quite distinct from other snipes or woodcocks.

== Taxonomy ==
The jack snipe was formally described in 1764 by the Danish zoologist Morten Thrane Brünnich under the binomial name Scolopax minima. He specified the type locality as the Danish island of Christiansø. Brünnich based his account on "La petite béccassine" that had been described and illustrated in 1760 by the French zoologist Mathurin Jacques Brisson. The jack snipe is now the only species placed in the genus Lymnocryptes that was introduced in 1826 by the German zoologist Friedrich Boie. The species is considered to be monotypic: no subspecies are recognised. The genus name Lymnocryptes is from Ancient Greek limne, "marsh" and kruptos, "hidden". The species name minimus is from Latin and means "smallest".

The common name has been said to come from the Welsh word for a snipe, giach (pronounced with a hard g), but modern dictionaries say it comes from the masculine name Jack. Alfred Newton hypothesized that, "It may be, as in Jackass, an indication of sex, for it is a popular belief that the Jack-Snipe is the male of the common species; or, again, it may refer to the comparatively small size of the bird, as the 'jack' in the game of bowls is the smallest of the balls used, and as fishermen call the smaller Pikes Jacks."

== Description ==
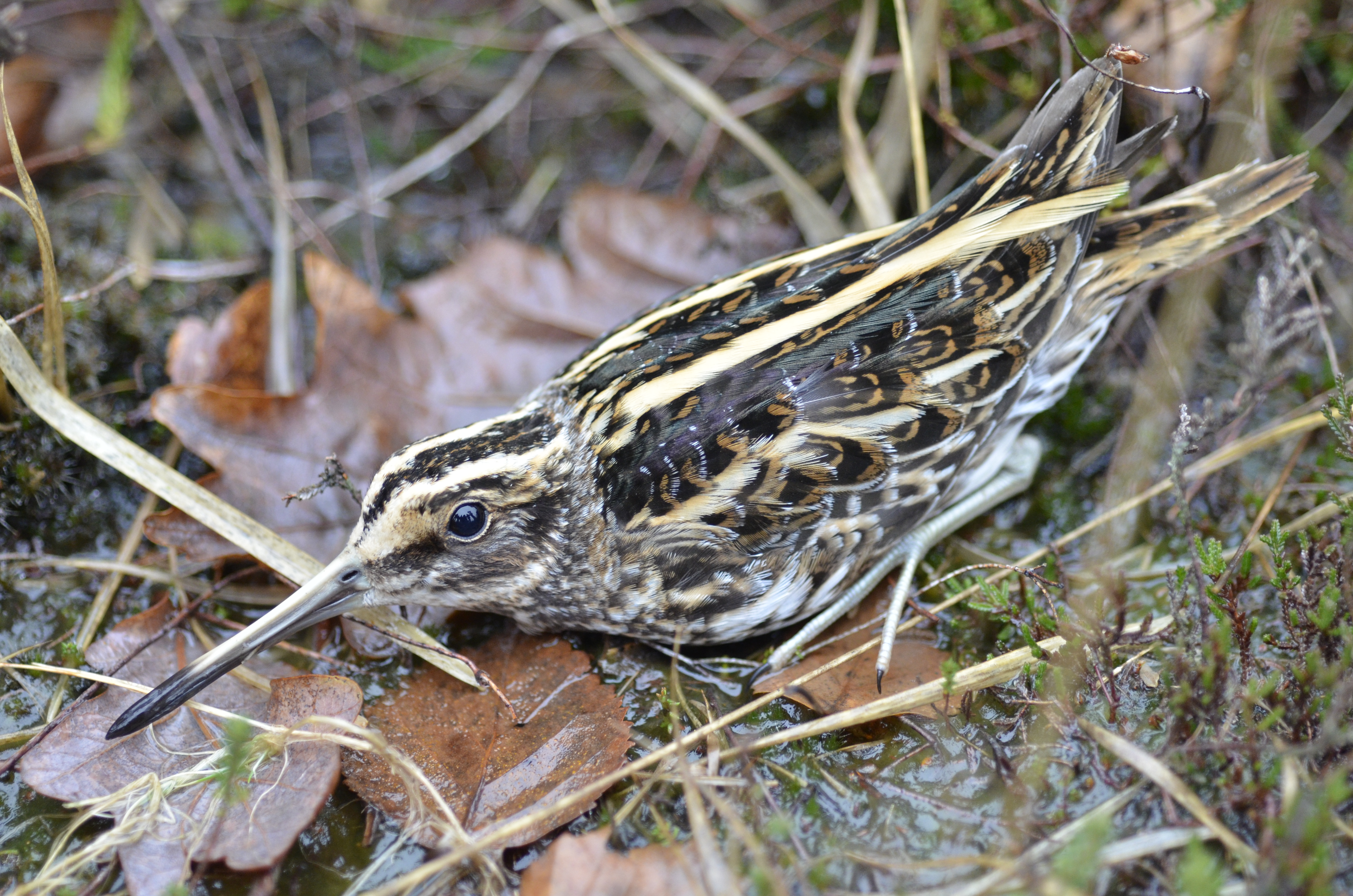
Lymnocryptes minimus

Adults are smaller than common snipes and have relatively shorter bills. The bird's length is 18–25 cm (7.1–9.8 in), wingspan is 30–41 cm (12–16 in) and weight is 33–73 g (1.2–2.6 oz). The body is mottled brown on top and pale underneath. Jack snipes have a dark stripe through the eye. The wings are pointed and narrow, and yellow back stripes are visible in flight. When seen, the distinctive bobbing movement, as if the bird is on springs, has an almost hypnotic quality.

The head pattern of the jack snipe differs from the common snipe and other species in the genus Gallinago, in that there is no central crown-stripe; instead, there are two pale lateral crown-stripes, which are separated from the supercilium by an area of dark plumage.

== Distribution and habitat ==
Jack snipes are migratory, spending the non-breeding period in Great Britain, Atlantic and Mediterranean coastal Europe, Africa, and India. The jack snipe is one of the species to which the Agreement on the Conservation of African-Eurasian Migratory Waterbirds (AEWA) applies. Their breeding habitat is marshes, bogs, tundra and wet meadows with short vegetation in northern Europe and northern Russia. They are rare vagrants in North America. There is also a record from Colombia in South America.

== Behaviour ==
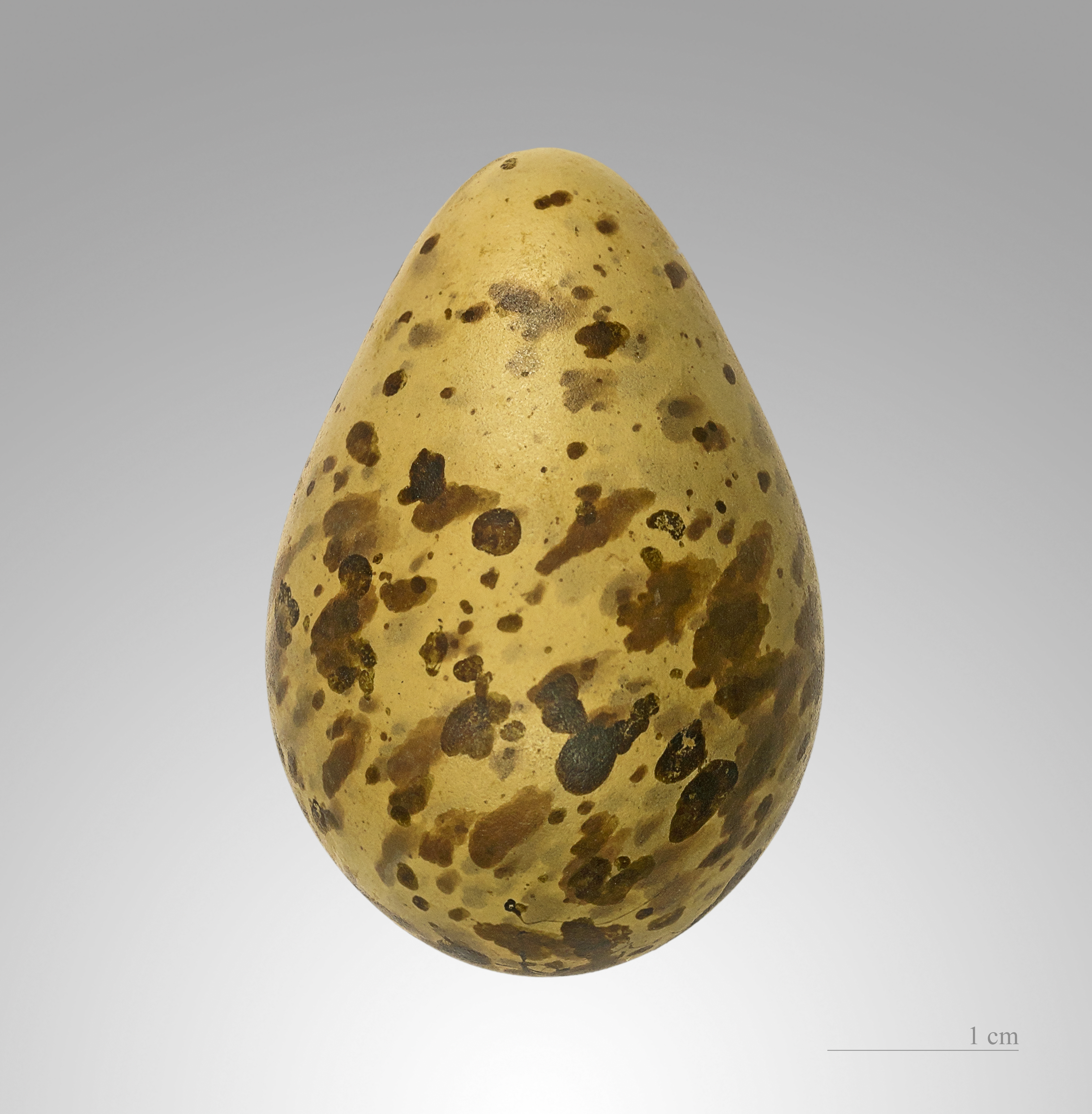
Jack snipe egg

Jack snipes can be secretive in their non-breeding areas and are difficult to observe, being well camouflaged in their habitat. Consequently, birdwatchers have developed a specialised technique for finding them. This involves walking through its marshy habitat until a bird is disturbed and flies up. Jack snipes will squat down and not flush from cover until an intruder is quite close. They then quietly fly a short distance before dropping back into vegetation.

=== Feeding ===
They forage in soft mud, probing or picking up food by sight. They mainly eat insects and earthworms, also plant material.

=== Breeding ===
The male performs an aerial display during courtship, during which it makes a distinctive sound like a galloping horse. It is silent in winter. They nest in a well-hidden location on the ground, laying 3–4 eggs.
