= Red vine =

Red vine or redvine may refer to:

- Basella alba, a vegetable also known as red vine spinach
- Brunnichia, a genus of woody vines known as redvine
- Red Vines, a brand of licorice
- "Red Vines", a song from the Aimee Mann album Bachelor No. 2 or, the Last Remains of the Dodo
- The Red Vine, a painting by George Bellows
- Siphlophis compressus, also known as red vine snake
