= Morten Thrane Brünnich =

Danish zoologist and mineralogist

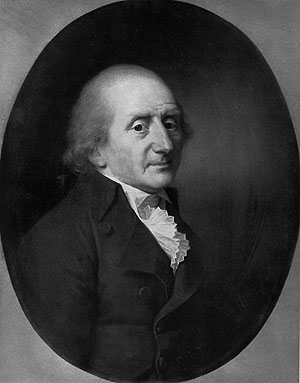
- Painting by Jens Juel, 1799
- Born: 30 September 1737; Copenhagen, Denmark
- Died: 19 September 1827 (aged 90)
- Known for: Zoologiae fundamenta. (1771-1772)
- Scientific career
- Fields: Zoology, Ornithology
- Institutions: Copenhagen University
- Author abbrev. (zoology): Brünnich

Morten Thrane Brünnich (30 September 1737 – 19 September 1827) was a Danish zoologist and mineralogist.

== Biography ==
Brünnich was born in Copenhagen, the son of a portrait painter. He studied oriental languages and theology, but soon became interested in natural history. He contributed his observations of insects to Erik Pontoppidan's Danske Atlas (1763–81). After being put in charge of the natural history collection of Christian Fleischer he became interested in ornithology, and in 1764 he published Ornithologia Borealis, which included the details of many Scandinavian birds, some described for the first time.

The publication of Ornithologia Borealis was aided by his insight in the collection.

Brünnich corresponded with many foreign naturalists including Linnaeus, Peter Simon Pallas and Thomas Pennant. He published his Entomologia in 1764. He then embarked on a long tour of Europe, spending time studying the fish of the Mediterranean Sea and publishing his Ichthyologia Massiliensis on the subject in 1768.

On his return Brünnich took up the post of Lecturer in Natural History and Economy at Copenhagen University. Here he established a natural history museum and wrote a textbook for his students, the Zoologiae fundamenta.

== Namesake creatures ==
Brünnich's guillemot and the European wasp spider are named after him.

Also in 1927, botanists Hutch. & Dalziel published Afrobrunnichia, which is a genus of plants in the family Polygonaceae with two species in West Africa. It was named in Morten Thrane Brünnich's honour.

== Works ==
Partial list

- Prodromus insectologiæ Siælandicæ. Kopenhagen 1761.
- Die natürliche Historie des Eider-Vogels. Kopenhagen 1763.
- Eder-Fuglens Beskrivelse. Kopenhagen 1763.
- Tillæg til Eder-Fuglens Beskrivelse. Kopenhagen 1763.
- Entomologia. Godiche, Kopenhagen 1764.
- Ornithologia borealis. Kall & Godiche, Kopenhagen 1764.
- Ichthyologia Massiliensis. Roth & Proft, Kopenhagen, Leipzig 1768.
- Appendix to Cronstedt's Mineralogy. London 1772.
- Zoologiæ fundamenta praelectionibus academicis accommodata. Pelt, Kopenhagen 1771/72.
- Mineralogie. Simmelkiær & Logan, Kopenhagen, St. Petersburg 1777-81.
- Dyrenes Historie og Dyre-Samlingen ud Universitetes Natur-Theater. Kopenhagen, 1782.
- Literatura Danica scientiarum naturalium. Kopenhagen, Leipzig 1783.
- Catalogus bibliothecæ historiæ naturalis. Kopenhagen 1793.
- Historiske Efterretninger om Norges Biergverker. Kopenhagen 1819.
- Kongsberg Sölvbergwerk i Norge. Kopenhagen 1826.
