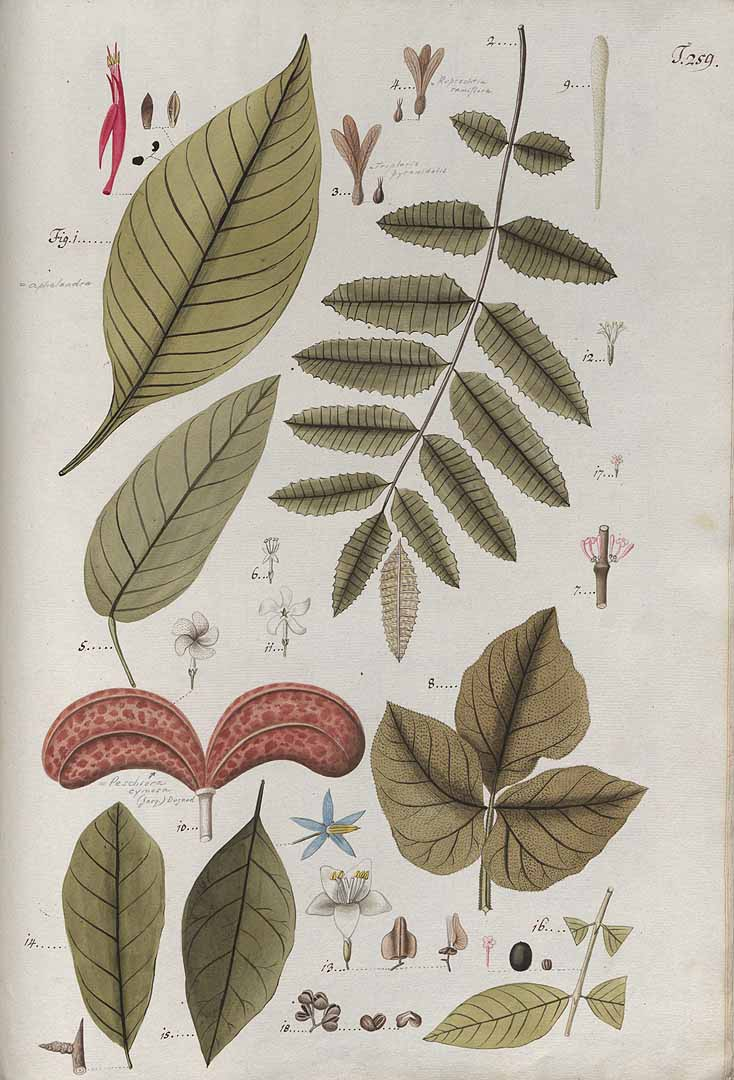
- Drawing of Enneatypus ramiflorus

Scientific classification
- Kingdom: Plantae
- Clade: Tracheophytes
- Clade: Angiosperms
- Clade: Eudicots
- Order: Caryophyllales
- Family: Polygonaceae
- Genus: Enneatypus; Herzog

= Enneatypus =

Genus of plants

Enneatypus is a genus of flowering plants belonging to the family Polygonaceae.

Its native range is Trinidad to Southern Tropical America.

Species:

- Enneatypus ramiflorus (C.A.Mey.) Roberty & Vautier
- Enneatypus tenuiflorus (Benth.) Roberty & Vautier
