= Eskemukerjea =

Scientific classification
- Kingdom: Plantae
- Clade: Tracheophytes
- Clade: Angiosperms
- Clade: Eudicots
- Order: Caryophyllales
- Family: Polygonaceae
- Genus: Eskemukerjea; Malick & Sengupta
- Species: E. megacarpum

Binomial name
- Eskemukerjea megacarpum (H.Hara) H.Hara

Genus of plants

Eskemukerjea is a genus of flowering plants belonging to the family Polygonaceae. The only species is Eskemukerjea megacarpum.

Its native range is Nepal and southern Tibet.
