= Leptogonum =

Conservation status
- Least Concern (IUCN 3.1)

Scientific classification
- Kingdom: Plantae
- Clade: Tracheophytes
- Clade: Angiosperms
- Clade: Eudicots
- Order: Caryophyllales
- Family: Polygonaceae
- Genus: Leptogonum; Benth. (1880)
- Species: L. domingense

Binomial name
- Leptogonum domingense Benth. (1880)

Genus of flowering plants

Leptogonum is a monotypic genus of plants in the family Polygonaceae. It has a single species, Leptogonum domingense, a shrub or tree endemic to the island of Hispaniola.

There are two accepted varieties:

- Leptogonum domingense var. domingense
- Leptogonum domingense var. molle (Urb.) Brandbyge
