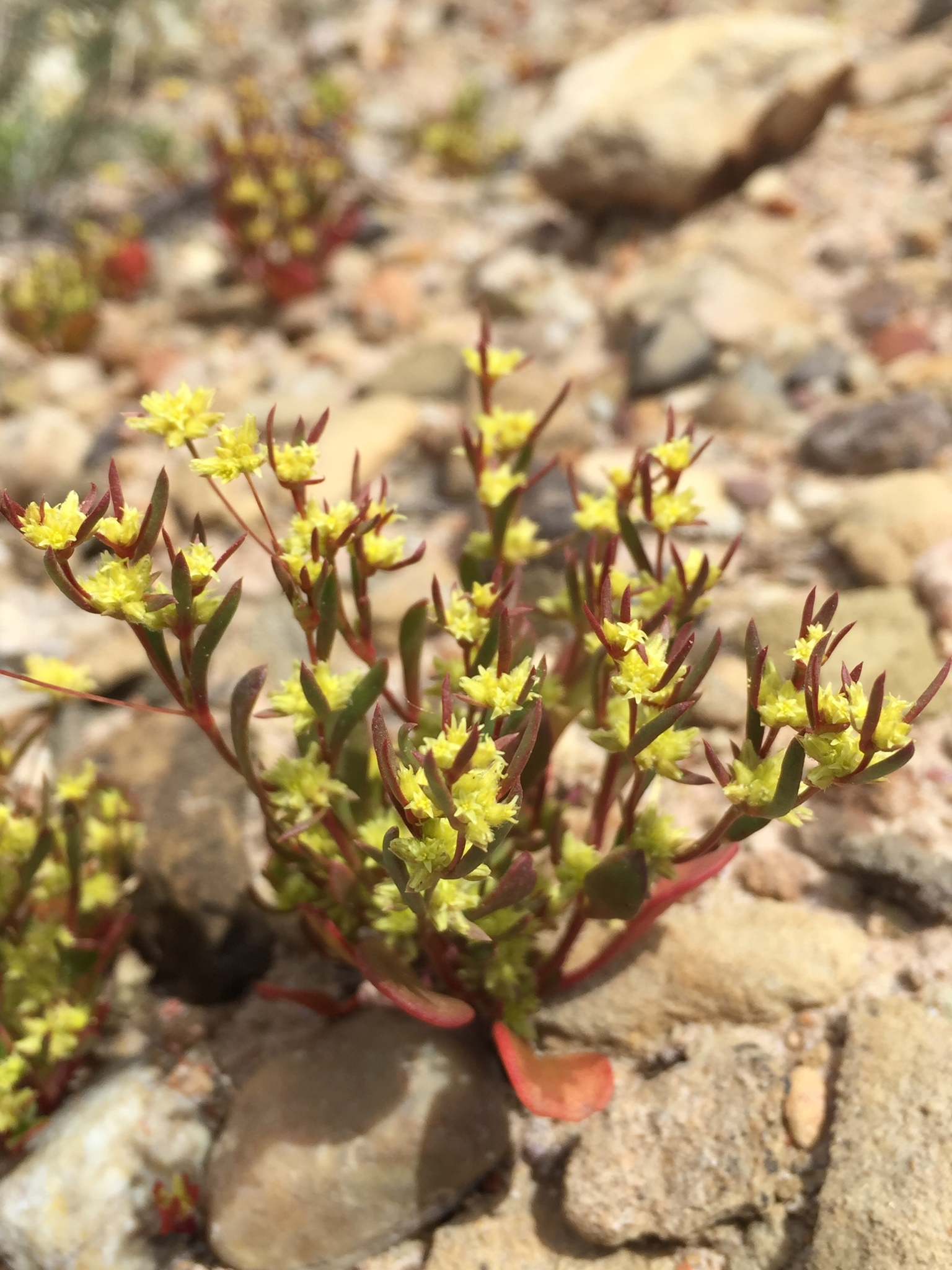
- Stenogonum salsuginosum

Scientific classification
- Kingdom: Plantae
- Clade: Tracheophytes
- Clade: Angiosperms
- Clade: Eudicots
- Order: Caryophyllales
- Family: Polygonaceae
- Subfamily: Eriogonoideae
- Genus: Stenogonum; Nutt.

Species
- Stenogonum flexum; Stenogonum salsuginosum

= Stenogonum =

Genus of flowering plants

Stenogonum is a genus of plants in the buckwheat family (Polygonaceae) with two species endemic to North America. The two species are S. flexum and S. salsuginosum. They are found primarily in the Colorado Plateau region of southern Wyoming, eastern Utah, western Colorado, northwestern New Mexico, and northern Arizona.
