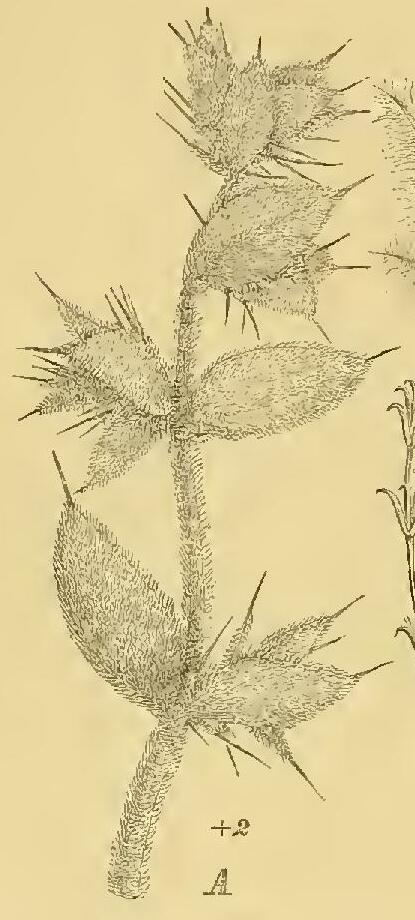

Scientific classification
- Kingdom: Plantae
- Clade: Tracheophytes
- Clade: Angiosperms
- Clade: Eudicots
- Order: Caryophyllales
- Family: Polygonaceae
- Subfamily: Eriogonoideae
- Genus: Hollisteria; S.Wats.
- Species: H. lanata

Binomial name
- Hollisteria lanata S.Wats.

= Hollisteria =

Genus of plants

Hollisteria is a genus of plants in the family Polygonaceae with a single species, Hollisteria lanata. It is endemic to California. It is known by the common name false spikeflower.

The genus was named for California rancher William Welles Hollister.
