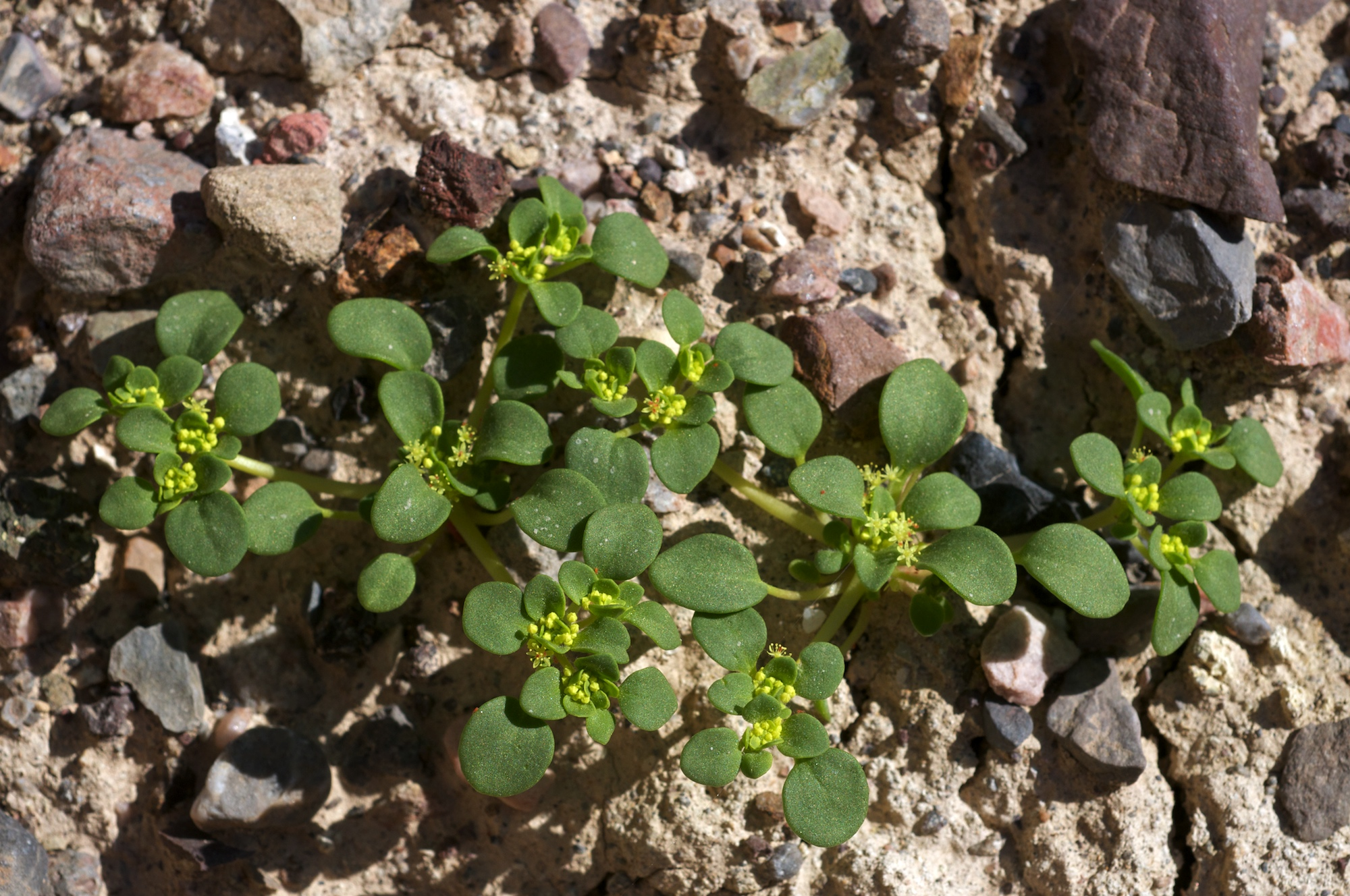

Conservation status
- Imperiled (NatureServe)

Scientific classification
- Kingdom: Plantae
- Clade: Tracheophytes
- Clade: Angiosperms
- Clade: Eudicots
- Order: Caryophyllales
- Family: Polygonaceae
- Subfamily: Eriogonoideae
- Genus: Gilmania; Coville
- Species: G. luteola

Binomial name
- Gilmania luteola (Coville) Coville

= Gilmania =

Genus of flowering plants

Gilmania luteola (called golden carpet or goldencarpet) is a rare annual plant in the Buckwheat family (Polygonaceae).

It is found only on barren alkaline slopes in Death Valley, California, United States, especially near Artist's Palette.

The plant grows in mats very low to the ground. There are only five known occurrences as of 2013. It grows only in very wet years, which rarely occur in the region.

The yellow flowers are quite small, and the plant has greenish-yellowish foliage. It is the only species in the monotypic genus Gilmania.
