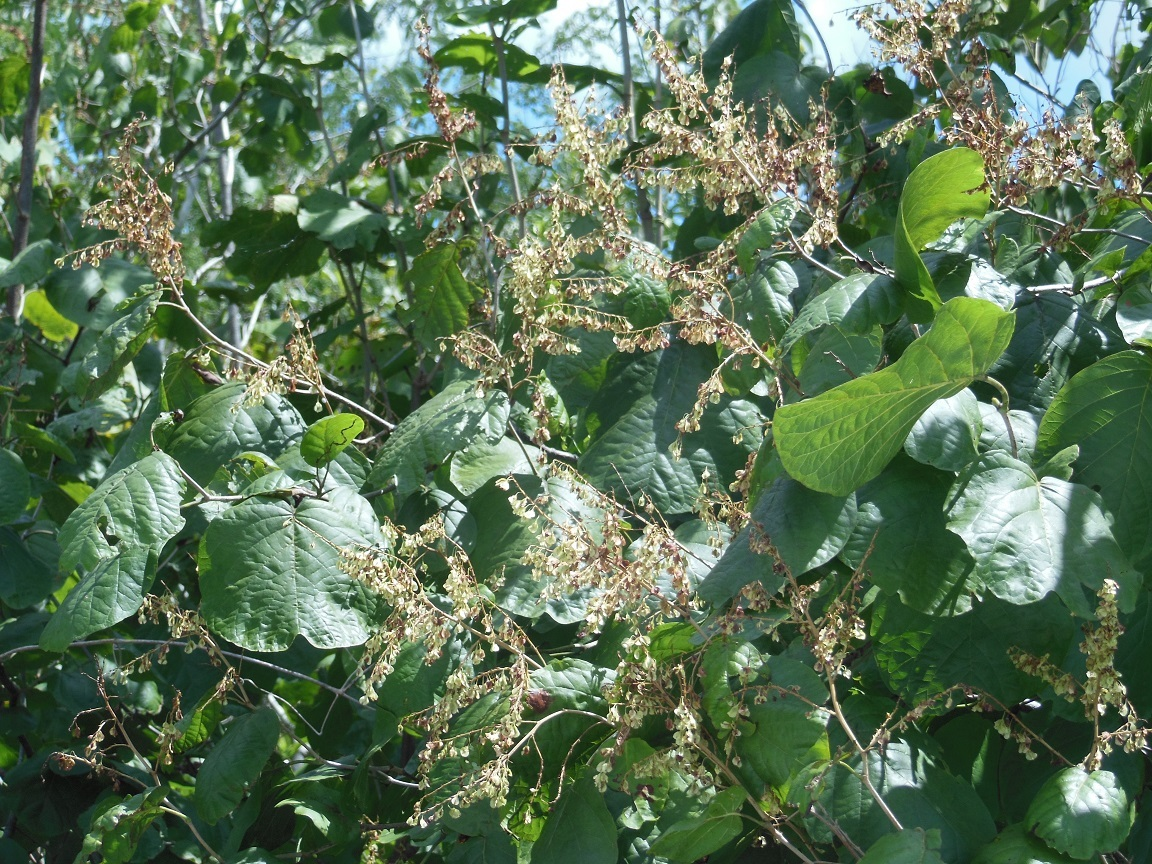
- Neomillspaughia emarginata

Scientific classification
- Kingdom: Plantae
- Clade: Tracheophytes
- Clade: Angiosperms
- Clade: Eudicots
- Order: Caryophyllales
- Family: Polygonaceae
- Subfamily: Eriogonoideae
- Genus: Neomillspaughia; S.F.Blake

Species
- Neomillspaughia emarginata (H.Gross) S.F.Blake; Neomillspaughia hondurensis J.J.Ortíz & Arnelas; Neomillspaughia paniculata (Donn.Sm.) S.F.Blake

= Neomillspaughia =

Genus of flowering plants

Neomillspaughia is a genus of plants in the family Polygonaceae with three known species in southeastern Mexico and Central America.

- Neomillspaughia emarginata (H.Gross) S.F.Blake
- Neomillspaughia hondurensis J.J.Ortíz & Arnelas
- Neomillspaughia paniculata (Donn.Sm.) S.F.Blake

The genus was first described by Sidney Fay Blake in 1921. He named the reclassified genus after Charles Frederick Millspaugh in recognition of Millspaugh's extensive collecting in Southeastern Mexico and the West Indies.
