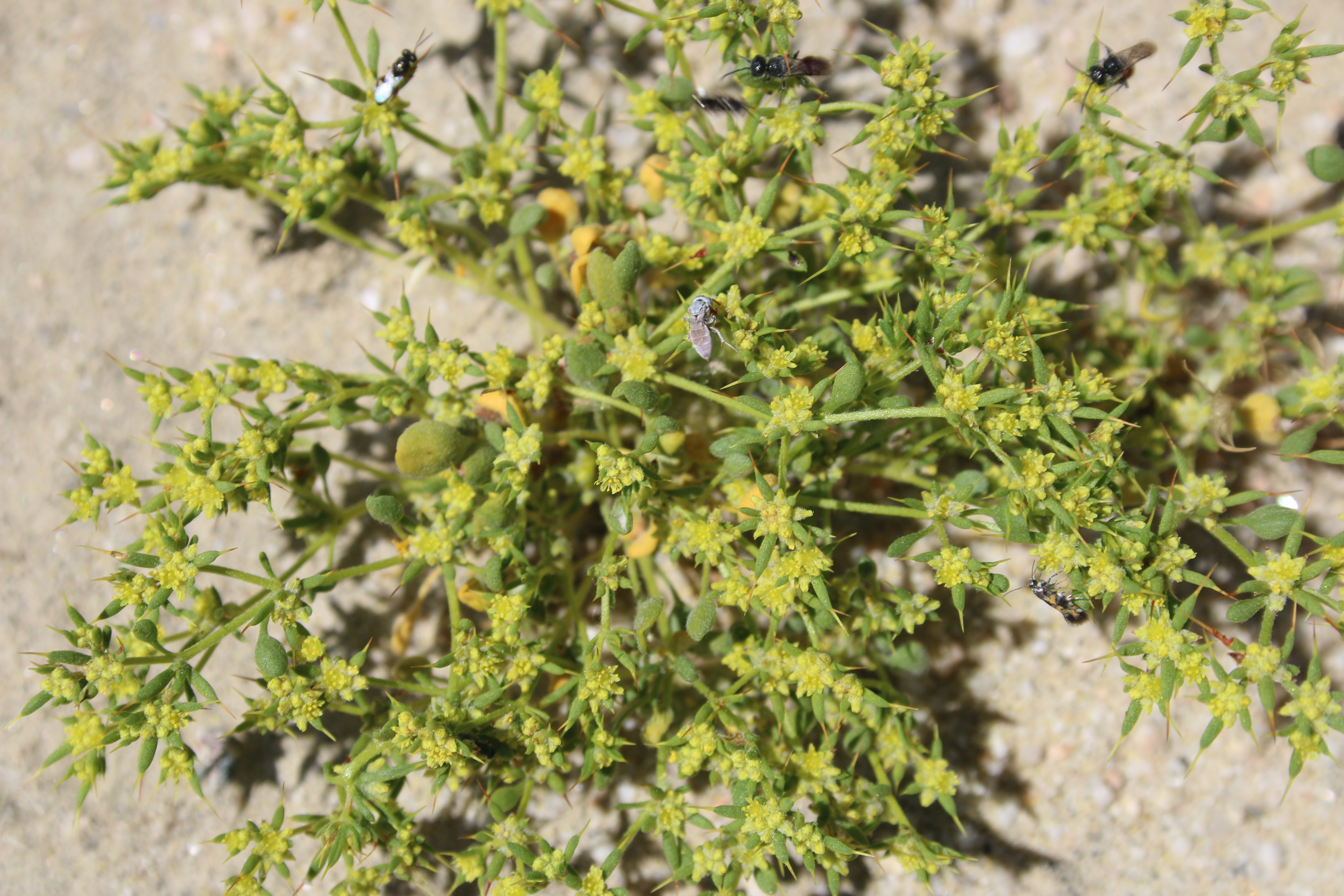

Scientific classification
- Kingdom: Plantae
- Clade: Tracheophytes
- Clade: Angiosperms
- Clade: Eudicots
- Order: Caryophyllales
- Family: Polygonaceae
- Subfamily: Eriogonoideae
- Genus: Goodmania; Reveal & Ertter
- Species: G. luteola

Binomial name
- Goodmania luteola (Parry) Reveal & Ertter

Synonyms
- Oxytheca luteola

= Goodmania =

Genus of flowering plants

Goodmania is a genus of plants in the family Polygonaceae containing the single species Goodmania luteola. Its common name is yellow spinecape. It is a tiny annual herb forming small patches on the ground no more than a few centimeters high and wide. It has fuzzy club-shaped leaves and bears bright yellow flowers. The plant is native to California and Nevada.
