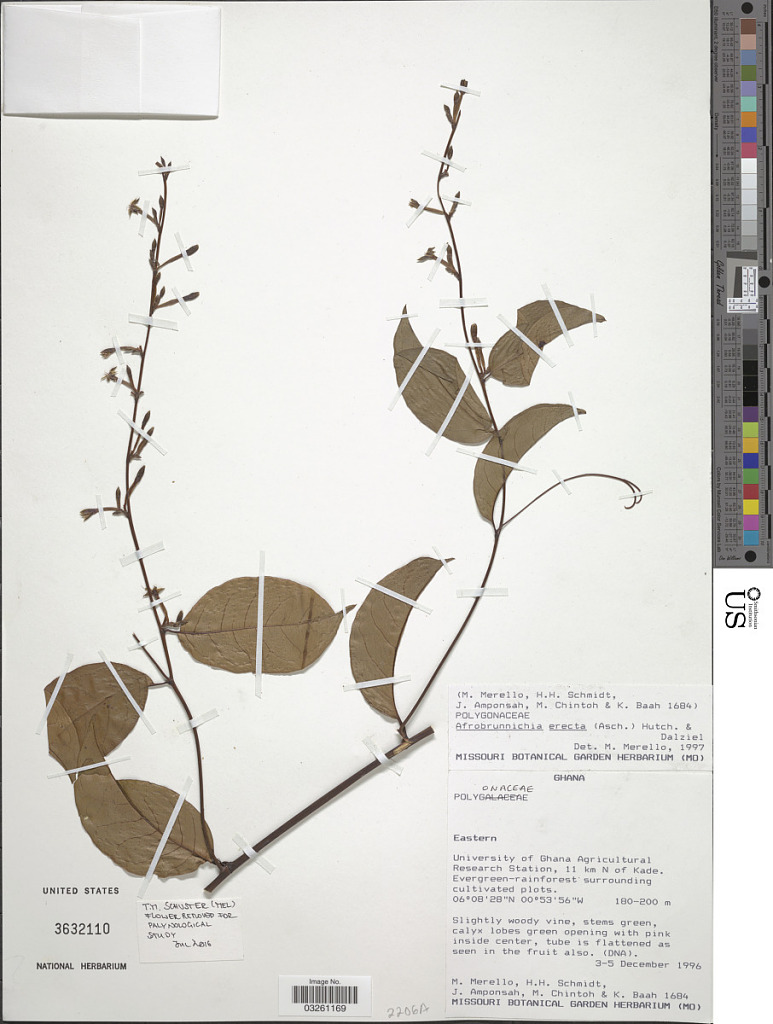
- Herbarium sheet of A. erecta

Scientific classification
- Kingdom: Plantae
- Clade: Tracheophytes
- Clade: Angiosperms
- Clade: Eudicots
- Order: Caryophyllales
- Family: Polygonaceae
- Genus: Afrobrunnichia; Hutch. & Dalziel

Species
- Afrobrunnichia africana; Afrobrunnichia erecta

= Afrobrunnichia =

Genus of flowering plants

Afrobrunnichia is a genus of plants in the family Polygonaceae with two species in West Africa.

It is native to Angola, Cameroon, Central African Repu, Congo, Gabon, Ghana, Ivory Coast, Liberia, Nigeria, Sierra Leone and Zaïre.

The genus name of Afrobrunnichia is in honour of Morten Thrane Brünnich (1737–1827), a Danish zoologist and mineralogist. It was first described and published in Fl. W. Trop. Afr. Vol.1 on page 118 in 1927.
