= Thigmotropism =

Directed growth of plants in response to touch

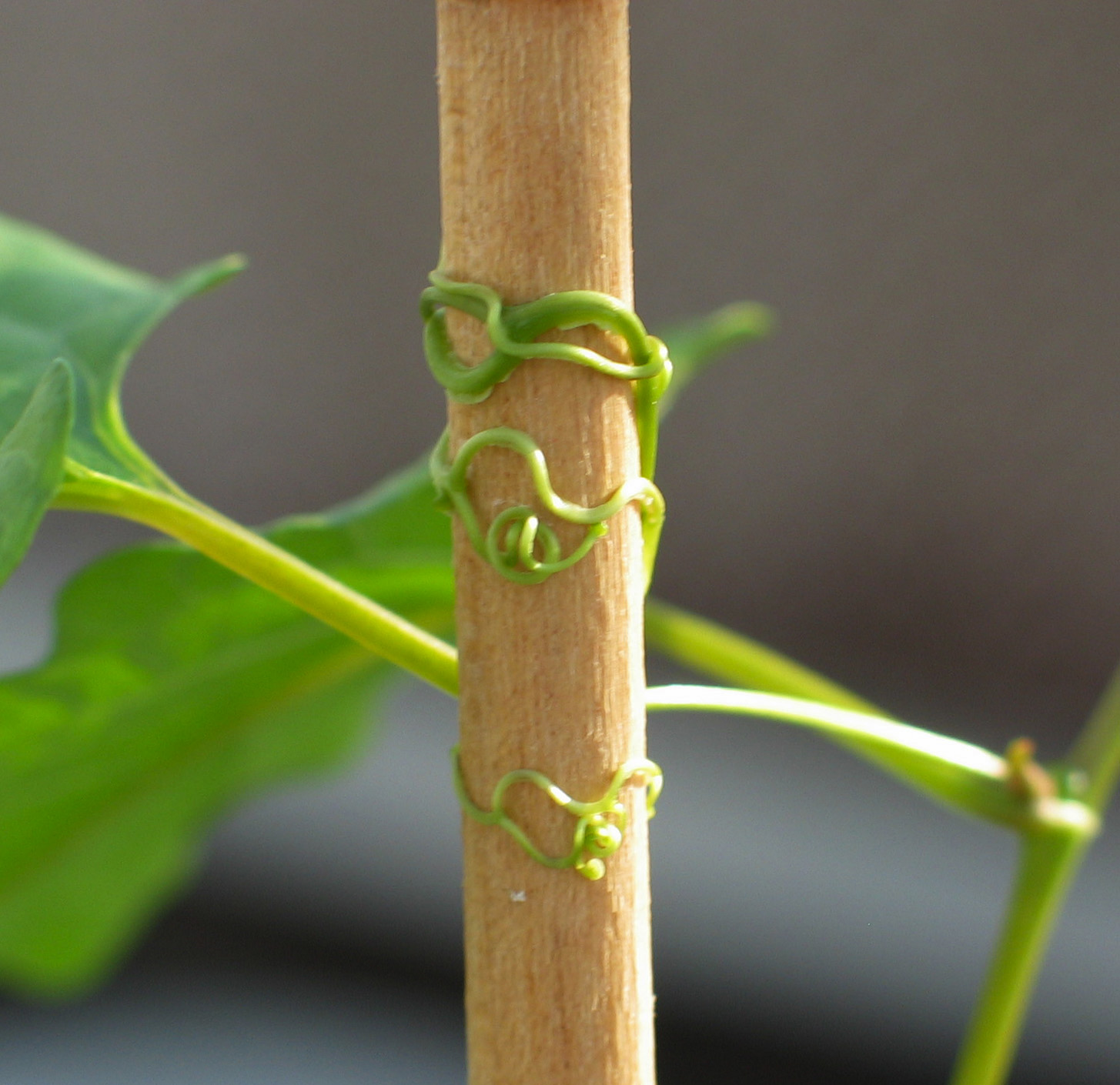
Redvine (Brunnichia ovata) tendrils coil upon contact.

In plant biology, thigmotropism is a directional growth movement which occurs as a mechanosensory response to a touch stimulus. Thigmotropism is typically found in twining plants and tendrils; however, plant biologists have also found thigmotropic responses in flowering plants and fungi. This behavior occurs due to unilateral growth inhibition. That is, the growth rate on the side of the stem which is being touched is slower than on the side opposite the touch. The resultant growth pattern is to attach and sometimes curl around the object which is touching the plant. However, flowering plants have also been observed to move or grow their sex organs toward a pollinator that lands on the flower, as in Portulaca grandiflora.

== Physiological factors ==
Since growth is a complex developmental procedure, there are indeed many requirements (both biotic and abiotic) that are needed for both touch perception and a thigmotropic response to occur. One of these is calcium. In a series of experiments in 1995 using the tendril Bryonia dioica, touch-sensing calcium channels were blocked using various antagonists. Responses to touch in treatment plants which received calcium channel inhibitors were diminished compared to control plants, indicating that calcium may be required for thigmotropism. Later in 2001, a membrane depolarization pathway was proposed in which calcium was involved: when a touch occurs, calcium channels open and calcium flows into the cell, shifting the electrochemical potential across the membrane. This triggers voltage-gated chloride and potassium channels to open and leads to an action potential that signals the perception of touch.

The plant growth hormone auxin has also been observed to be involved in thigmotropic behavior in plants, but its role is not well understood. Instead of asymmetric auxin distribution influencing other tropisms, it has been shown that a unidirectional thigmotropic response can occur even with a symmetric distribution of auxin. It has been proposed that the action potential arising from a touch stimulus leads to an increase of auxin in the cell, which causes the production of an contractile protein on the side of the touch that allows the plant to grip onto an object. Further, it has been shown that when auxin (typically leading to growth away from the side of its localization) and a touch stimulus (causing a tropic response toward its localization) were applied on the same side of a cucumber hypocotyl, the stem will curve towards the touch.

Ethylene, another plant hormone, has also been shown to be an important regulator to the thigmotropic response in Arabidopsis thaliana roots. Under normal circumstances, high ethylene concentrations in the roots promote straight growth. When the root encounters a rigid object, the thigmotropic response is activated and ethylene production is down-regulated, leading to the root to bend while growing rather than growing straight.

Like phototropism, a thigmotropic response in stems requires light. Plant biologist Mark Jaffe performed a simple preliminary experiment using pea plants that led to this conclusion. He found that when he snipped a tendril off of a pea plant and placed it in the light, then repeatedly touched one side of it, the tendril would begin to curl. However, when performing this same experiment in the dark, the tendril would not curl.

While thigmotropic responses were historically thought to explain how lichen-forming fungi interact with algal cells during symbiosis formation, research has demonstrated this is not the case. In a 2009 study with the lichen fungus Cladonia grayi, it was found that the fungus displays a distinctive growth response involving increased lateral branching only when encountering its compatible algal partner Asterochloris sp., but not when encountering glass beads of similar size or other photosynthetic organisms. This indicates that rather than being a simple mechanical (thigmotropic) response to physical contact, the fungal growth pattern represents a specific biological recognition response between compatible symbiotic partners. The fungus did adhere to and grow over various surfaces including glass beads, but without exhibiting the specialized branching pattern seen in successful lichen partnerships.

== In roots ==
Roots also rely on touch to navigate their way through the soil. Generally, roots have a negative touch response, meaning when they feel an object, they would grow away from the object. This allows the roots to go through the soil with minimum resistance. Because of this behavior, roots are said to be negatively thigmotropic. Research suggests that this active obstacle avoidance by roots is driven by polar auxin transport. Thigmotropism seems to be able to override the strong gravitropic response of even primary roots. Charles Darwin performed experiments where he found that in a vertical bean root, a contact stimulus could divert the root away from the vertical.

== Misconception ==
Mimosa pudica is well known for its rapid plant movement. The leaves close up and droop when touched. However, this is not a form of tropism, but a nastic movement, a similar phenomenon. Nastic movements are non-directional responses to stimuli (e.g. temperature, humidity, light irradiance), and are usually associated with plants.
