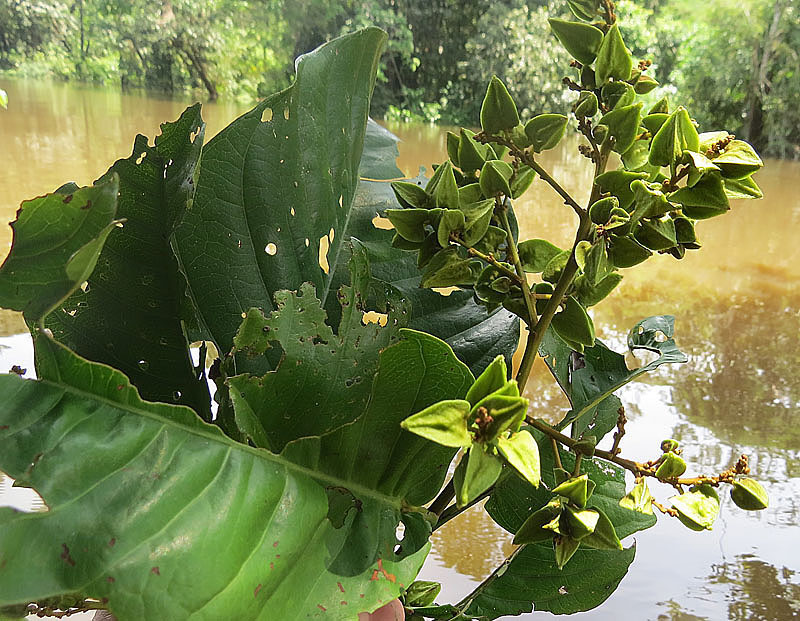

Scientific classification
- Kingdom: Plantae
- Clade: Tracheophytes
- Clade: Angiosperms
- Clade: Eudicots
- Order: Caryophyllales
- Family: Polygonaceae
- Genus: Symmeria; Benth.
- Species: S. paniculata

Binomial name
- Symmeria paniculata Benth.

Synonyms
- Amalobotrya latifolia Kunth ex Meisn.; Thurnheyssera tragopyrum Mart. ex Meisn.

= Symmeria =

Genus of plants

Symmeria is a genus of plants in the family Polygonaceae with a single species, Symmeria paniculata, distributed in South America as well as western Africa. It is morphologically variable and dioecious, with male and female flowers on separate individuals.
