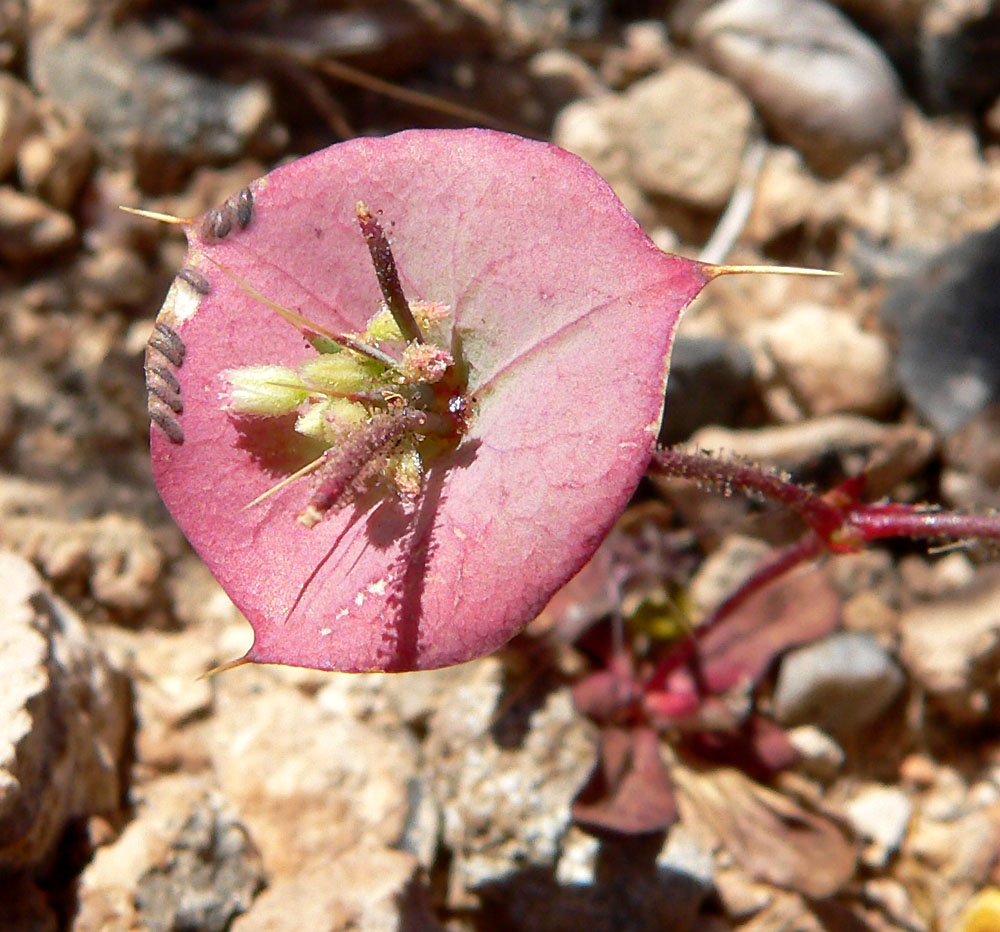
- Oxytheca perfoliata

Scientific classification
- Kingdom: Plantae
- Clade: Tracheophytes
- Clade: Angiosperms
- Clade: Eudicots
- Order: Caryophyllales
- Family: Polygonaceae
- Subfamily: Eriogonoideae
- Genus: Oxytheca; Nutt.

Species
- 3; see text

Synonyms
- Brisegnoa J.Rémy; Tetrarhaphis Miers

= Oxytheca =

Genus of flowering plants

Oxytheca is a genus of plants in the family Polygonaceae. It includes three species native to dry and temperate parts of the western United States and southern South America. The taxonomy of this genus is in flux, with some species listed under tentative new names.

== Species ==
Three species are accepted.

- Oxytheca dendroidea Nutt.
- Oxytheca perfoliata Torr. & A.Gray
- Oxytheca watsonii Torr. & A.Gray ex S.Watson

=== Formerly placed here ===
- Acanthoscyphus parishii (Parry) Small (as Oxytheca parishii Parry)
