= Aristocapsa =

Conservation status
- Critically Imperiled (NatureServe)

Scientific classification
- Kingdom: Plantae
- Clade: Tracheophytes
- Clade: Angiosperms
- Clade: Eudicots
- Order: Caryophyllales
- Family: Polygonaceae
- Subfamily: Eriogonoideae
- Genus: Aristocapsa; Reveal & Hardham
- Species: A. insignis

Binomial name
- Aristocapsa insignis (Curran) Reveal & Hardham

Synonyms
- Centrostegia insignis Chorizanthe insignis Oxytheca insignis

Genus of flowering plants

Aristocapsa is a genus of plants in the family Polygonaceae with a single species, Aristocapsa insignis, restricted to California. It is known by the common names Indian Valley spineflower or Indian Valley spinecape, and it is endemic to the inland southern Coast Ranges of Monterey and San Luis Obispo Counties.
