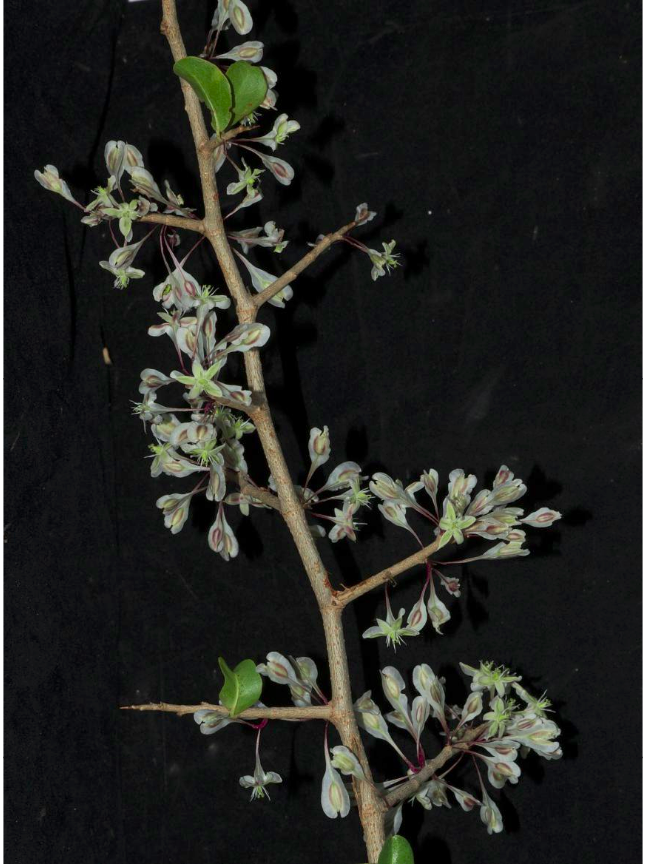
- Podopterus mexicanus

Scientific classification
- Kingdom: Plantae
- Clade: Tracheophytes
- Clade: Angiosperms
- Clade: Eudicots
- Order: Caryophyllales
- Family: Polygonaceae
- Subfamily: Eriogonoideae
- Genus: Podopterus; Bonpl.

Species
- Podopterus cordifolius Rose & Standl.; Podopterus guatemalensis S.F.Blake; Podopterus mexicanus Bonpl.

= Podopterus =

Genus of flowering plants

Podopterus is a genus of plants in the family Polygonaceae, with three species native to Mexico and Central America.

- Podopterus cordifolius Rose & Standl.
- Podopterus guatemalensis S.F.Blake
- Podopterus mexicanus Bonpl.
