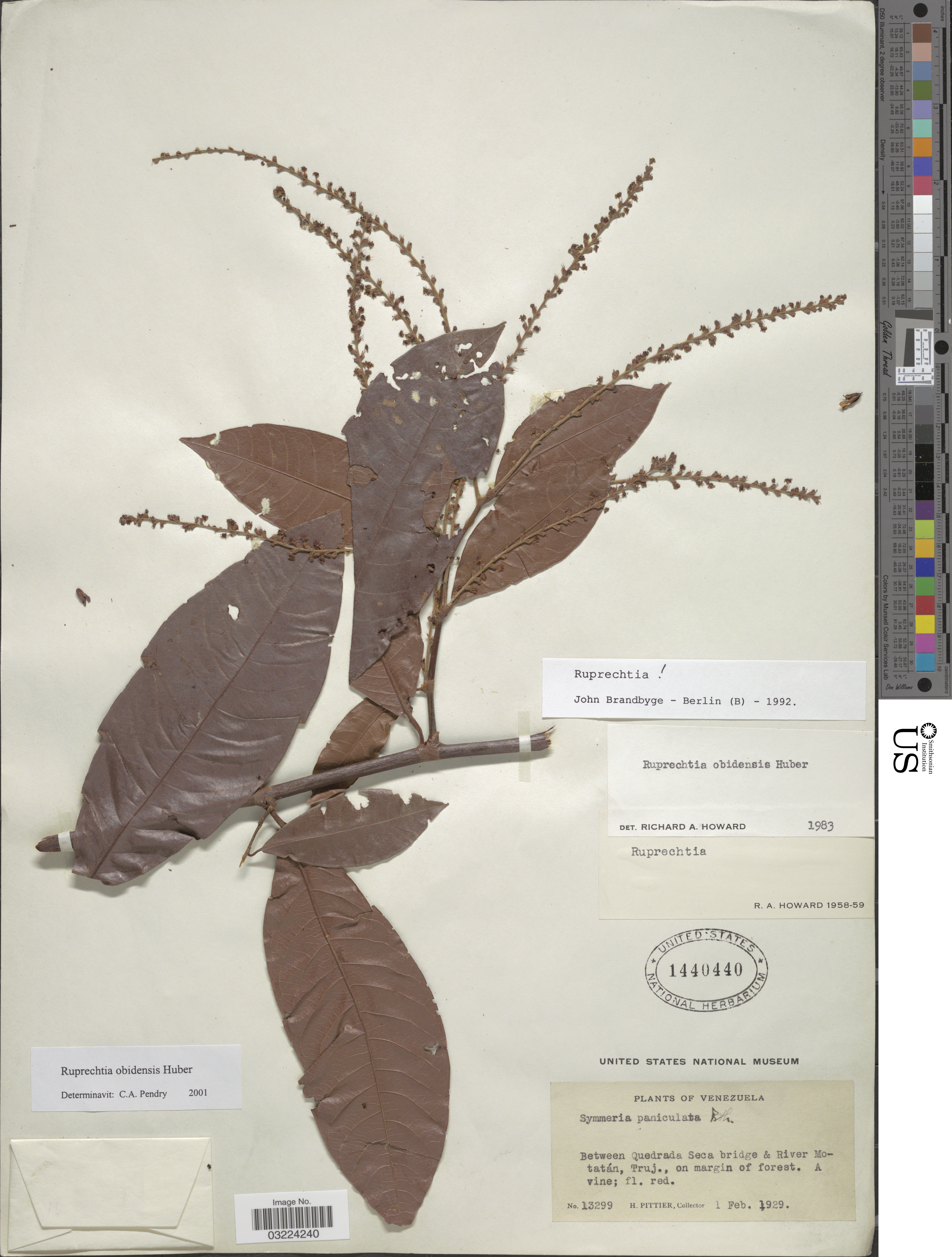

Scientific classification
- Kingdom: Plantae
- Clade: Tracheophytes
- Clade: Angiosperms
- Clade: Eudicots
- Order: Caryophyllales
- Family: Polygonaceae
- Genus: Magoniella; Adr.Sanchez
- Species: M. obidensis

Binomial name
- Magoniella obidensis (Huber) Adr.Sanchez

Synonyms
- Ruprechtia obidensis Huber; Coccoloba zernyi Standl.; Magonia scandens Vell.; Magoniella laurifolia (Cham. & Schltdl.) Adr.Sanchez; Ruprechtia apetala var. sprucei Meisn.; Ruprechtia laurifolia (Cham. & Schltdl.) C.A.Mey.; Ruprechtia macrocalyx Huber; Ruprechtia scandens Rusby; Ruprechtia zernyi (Standl.) R.A.Howard; Triplaris laurifolia Cham. & Schltdl.; Triplaris salicifolia} Miq. ex Meisn.; Triplaris scandens (Vell.) Cocucci

= Magoniella =

Genus of plants

Magoniella is a monotypic genus of flowering plants belonging to the family Polygonaceae. The only species is Magoniella obidensis. Its native range is Costa Rica, Venezuela to Brazil and Bolivia.
