= Caelestium =

Scientific classification
- Kingdom: Plantae
- Clade: Tracheophytes
- Clade: Angiosperms
- Clade: Eudicots
- Order: Caryophyllales
- Family: Polygonaceae
- Genus: Caelestium; Yurtseva & Mavrodiev (2019)

Species
- Caelestium lazkovii (Yurtseva & Mavrodiev) Yurtseva & Mavrodiev; Caelestium tianschanicum (Chang Y.Yang) Yurtseva & Mavrodiev

Genus of flowering plants

Caelestium is a genus of flowering plants in the family Polygonaceae. It includes two species of subshrubs native to Kyrgyzstan and Xinjiang in central Asia.

- Caelestium lazkovii (Yurtseva & Mavrodiev) Yurtseva & Mavrodiev – Kyrgyzstan
- Caelestium tianschanicum (Chang Y.Yang) Yurtseva & Mavrodiev – Xinjiang
