= Salta triflora =

Scientific classification
- Kingdom: Plantae
- Clade: Tracheophytes
- Clade: Angiosperms
- Clade: Eudicots
- Order: Caryophyllales
- Family: Polygonaceae
- Subfamily: Eriogonoideae
- Tribe: Triplarideae
- Genus: Salta; Adr.Sanchez
- Species: S. triflora

Binomial name
- Salta triflora (Griseb.) Adr.Sanchez

Synonyms
- Magonia triflora (Griseb.) Kuntze; Ruprechtia triflora Griseb. (1879) (basionym); Ruprechtia triflora var. guaranitica Chodat & Hassl.; Triplaris triflora (Griseb.) Kuntze

Species of flowering plant

Salta triflora is a species of flowering plant in the family Polygonaceae. It is a shrub or tree native to northern Argentina, Bolivia, west-central Brazil, and Paraguay. It is the sole species in genus Salta.

The species was first described as Ruprechtia triflora by August Grisebach in 1879. In 2011 Adriana Sanchez placed it in the newly described monotypic genus Salta as Salta triflora.
