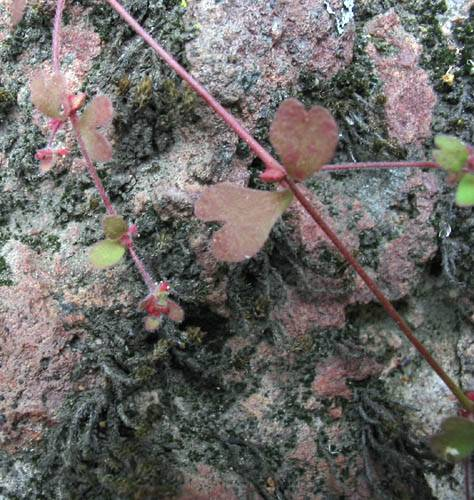

Scientific classification
- Kingdom: Plantae
- Clade: Tracheophytes
- Clade: Angiosperms
- Clade: Eudicots
- Order: Caryophyllales
- Family: Polygonaceae
- Subfamily: Eriogonoideae
- Genus: Pterostegia; Fisch. & C.A. Mey.
- Species: P. drymarioides

Binomial name
- Pterostegia drymarioides Fisch. & C.A. Mey.

= Pterostegia =

Pterostegia drymarioides

Genus of plants

Pterostegia is a monotypic plant genus containing only the single species Pterostegia drymarioides, which is known as the woodland threadstem, woodland pterostegia, fairy mist, or fairy bowties.

== Distribution ==
The plant is native to the western United States, California, Baja California, and Northwestern Mexico. The plant is most commonly found carpeting the ground in shady areas, such as in the understory of a cool forest or chaparral woodlands. It sometimes grows hidden from view beneath other plants. It also is found in shaded areas of desert habitats.

== Description ==
Pterostegia drymarioides is a very small annual spreading or climbing plant with very thin, hairy stems. The tiny leaves are lobed or heart-shaped and may be green or pink. The plant may sprawl across the ground in a thin layer or may form small patches here and there.

The plant bears tiny bright pink flowers.
