= ARA Salta =

At least two ships of the Argentine Navy have been named ARA Salta :

- ARA Salta (1932), a Santa Fe-class submarine launched in 1932 and decommissioned in 1960.
- ARA Salta (S-31), a Type 209 submarine commissioned in 1973.
