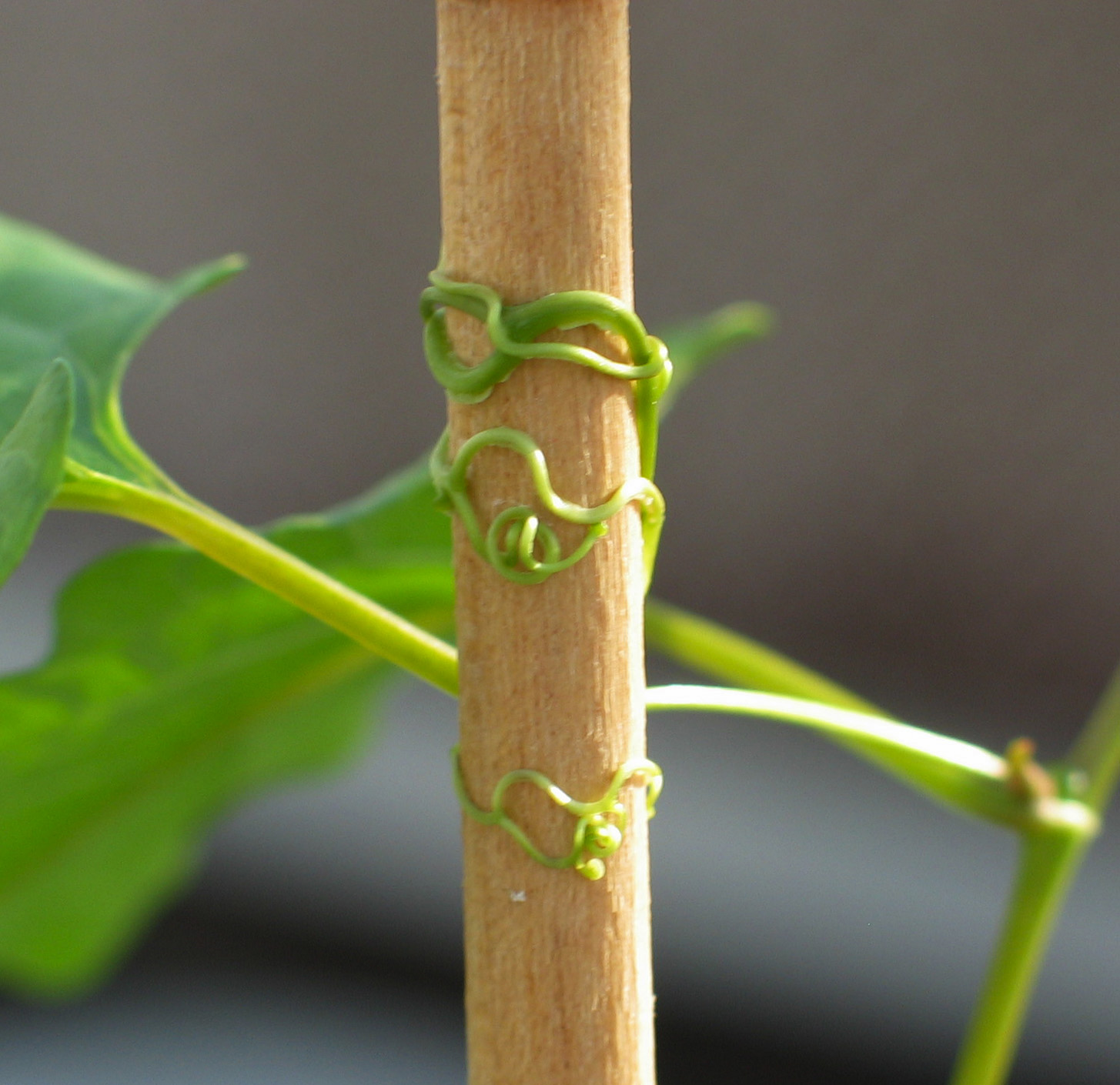
- Brunnichia ovata tendrils

Scientific classification
- Kingdom: Plantae
- Clade: Tracheophytes
- Clade: Angiosperms
- Clade: Eudicots
- Order: Caryophyllales
- Family: Polygonaceae
- Genus: Brunnichia; Banks ex Gaertn.
- Species: B. ovata

Binomial name
- Brunnichia ovata (Walter) Shinners

Synonyms
- Rajania Walter; Brunnichia cirrhosa Gaertn.; Fallopia cirrhosa (Gaertn.) Hofer ex M.Gómez; Polygonum claviculatum Meisn.; Rajania caroliniana J.F.Gmel.; Rajania ovata Walter (1788) (species basionym)

= Brunnichia =

Genus of flowering plants

Brunnichia is a genus of flowering plants in the family Polygonaceae. It includes a single species, Brunnichia ovata, commonly known as redvine, American buckwheat vine or ladies' eardrops, a woody vine native to the central and southeastern United States.

== Description ==
Brunnichia ovata is made up of an alternate leaf arrangement of its simple leaves. It is regarded as deciduous and the blades of its leaves are ovate or having an oval shape. Its leaves can range anywhere from 2 to 5 inches in length and its petioles are usually short. The flowering of the Brunnichia ovata species is typically seen from June to July and they are greenish in color. The fruit of the species is coined by its common name, “ear-drops” due to its appearance of hanging earrings. The stems shows proximal portions to be woody and the distal portions of the shoots to be herbaceous. Hence the species is regarded as a semi-woody vine. The optimum temperature found for germination of the species is 35 °C in both soil and Petri dishes. Below or above, 25 °C and 40 °C, respectively will yield no germination or emergence. Furthermore it requires altitude ranges of 0 to 200 meters and can grow up to 40 feet tall.

== Geographic distribution ==
Brunnichia ovata is a native vine to North America. It is native to coastal plains of the south-central and southeastern United States, ranging from Texas to Alabama, as far north as southern Illinois, and eastward to Georgia. Plants grow near riverbanks, the perimeters of lakes, wet woods and thickets.

== Uses ==
Redvine is a native species to the US and a favored plant for honey production by beekeepers. In January 2019, the largest honey producer in Arkansas announced they were closing production due to damage to native wildflowers from the herbicide Dicamba, and possibly relocating to Mississippi. Redvine was specifically cited by the owner of Crooked Creek Bee Company as an example of native vegetation being destroyed leading to an inferior product.

Redvine species are a pest when they grow within crops; for example, Brunnichia ovata is a significant problem in soybean crops in the Mississippi Delta. It is an example for thigmotropism. Usually thigmotropism occurs when plants grow around a surface, such as a wall, pot, or trellis. Climbing plants, such as vines, develop tendrils that coil around supporting objects. Touched cells produce auxin and transport it to untouched cells. Some untouched cells will then elongate faster so cell growth bends around the object. Some seedlings also exhibit triple response, caused by pulses of ethylene which cause the stem to thicken and curve to start growing horizontally.

== Taxonomy ==
The species was first described as Rajania ovata by Thomas Walter in Flora Caroliniana in 1778. It was reassigned from the genus Rajania to Brunnichia by Lloyd Shinners in the publication Sida in 1967.
