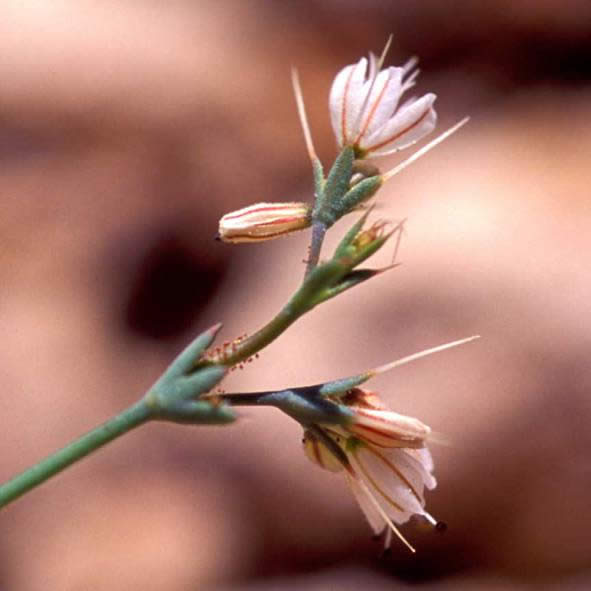
- A. parishii var. goodmaniana

Scientific classification
- Kingdom: Plantae
- Clade: Tracheophytes
- Clade: Angiosperms
- Clade: Eudicots
- Order: Caryophyllales
- Family: Polygonaceae
- Genus: Acanthoscyphus; Small
- Species: A. parishii

Binomial name
- Acanthoscyphus parishii (Parry) Small

Synonyms
- Eriogonum abramsii subsp. acanthoscyphus S. Stokes; Oxytheca parishii Parry

= Acanthoscyphus =

Genus of flowering plants

Acanthoscyphus is a monotypic genus in the family Polygonaceae that contains the single species Acanthoscyphus parishii, which is sometimes called Parish's oxytheca. This species is native and endemic to southern California.

== Taxonomy ==
Four varieties of Acanthoscyphus parishii are recognized:

- A. p. var. abramsii (Abrams' oxytheca) is limited to the chaparral of mountain slopes in Santa Barbara and Ventura Counties
- A. p. var. cienegensis (Cienega Seca oxytheca) is known from only about six occurrences in the San Bernardino Mountains
- A. p. var. goodmaniana (Cushenbury oxytheca) is federally listed as an endangered species; it is known only from loose, rocky, limestone scree on steep north-facing slopes in the San Bernardino Mountains in an area highly disturbed by limestone mining operations
- A. p. var. parishii is found in sandy, gravelly habitat in the Transverse Ranges

== Description ==
It is an annual herb producing a waxy, hairless, leafless stem up to about 60 centimeters in maximum height in the spring when it is time to flower; during the winter the plant is a small rosette of oval leaves a few centimeters wide. The inflorescence atop the stem is an array of small cymes of flowers, each enveloped in a partially fused cup of bracts tipped in spinelike awns. The flower has six hairy white or pinkish lobes.

== Habitat and distribution ==
The species is endemic to California, where it is known only from the Transverse Ranges and nearby slopes of the southernmost Central Coast Ranges. It grows in dry and rocky mountain soils and has low water tolerance. It can be found at elevations of 1500-2500 meters. The species requires an annual precipitation of 30-104 centimeters and a temperature range of 26-31 degrees Celsius. The species has a growing period of 2-5 months and typically blooms between June and August.
