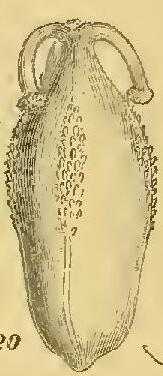
- Nemacaulis flower

Scientific classification
- Kingdom: Plantae
- Clade: Tracheophytes
- Clade: Angiosperms
- Clade: Eudicots
- Order: Caryophyllales
- Family: Polygonaceae
- Subfamily: Eriogonoideae
- Genus: Nemacaulis; Nutt.
- Species: N. denudata

Binomial name
- Nemacaulis denudata Nutt.

Synonyms
- Eriogonum nemacaulis

= Nemacaulis =

Genus of flowering plants

Nemacaulis is a monotypic plant genus in the buckwheat family containing the single species Nemacaulis denudata, which is known by the common names woollyheads and cottonheads. This plant is a somewhat undistinguished delicate annual herb with thin, spindly, naked stems and woolly white flowerheads. It can be found in sandy habitats in California, Arizona, and northern Mexico.
