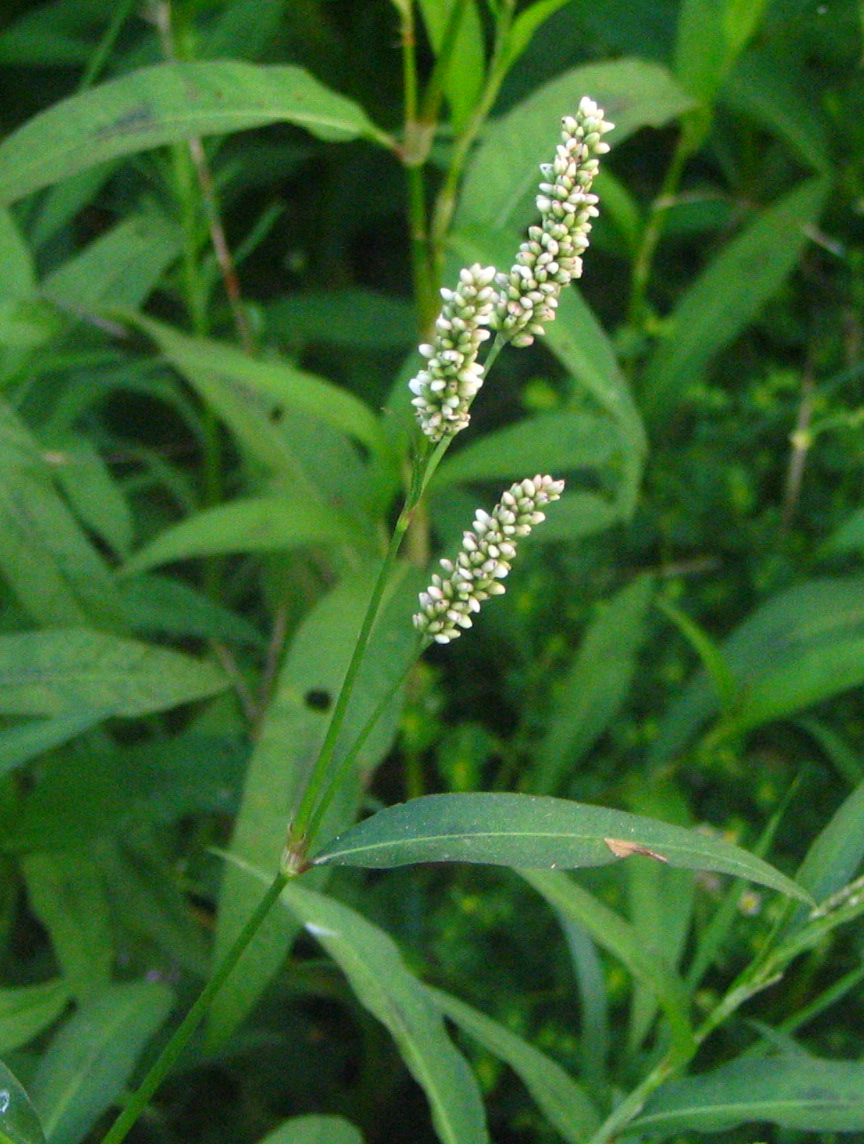
- Persicaria maculosa

Scientific classification
- Kingdom: Plantae
- Clade: Tracheophytes
- Clade: Angiosperms
- Clade: Eudicots
- Order: Caryophyllales
- Family: Polygonaceae; Juss.

Subfamilies
- Polygonoideae; Eriogonoideae

= Polygonaceae =

Knotweed family of flowering plants

The Polygonaceae are a family of flowering plants known informally as the knotweed family or smartweed—buckwheat family in the United States. The name is based on the genus Polygonum, and was first used by Antoine Laurent de Jussieu in 1789 in his book, Genera Plantarum. The name may refer to the many swollen nodes the stems of some species have, being derived from Greek (poly meaning 'many' and gony meaning 'knee' or 'joint'). Alternatively, it may have a different origin, meaning 'many seeds'.

The Polygonaceae comprise about 1,200 species distributed into about 48 genera. The largest genera are Eriogonum (240 species), Rumex (200 species), Coccoloba (120 species), Persicaria (100 species) and Calligonum (80 species). The family is present worldwide, but is most diverse in the North Temperate Zone.

Several species are cultivated as ornamentals. A few species of Triplaris provide lumber. The fruit of the sea grape (Coccoloba uvifera) is eaten, and in Florida, jelly is made from it and sold commercially. The seeds of two species of Fagopyrum, known as buckwheat, are eaten in the form of groats or used to make flour. The petioles of rhubarb (Rheum rhabarbarum and hybrids) are a food item. The leaves of the common sorrel (Rumex acetosa) are eaten in salads or as a leaf vegetable.

Polygonaceae contain some of the most prolific weeds, including species of Persicaria, Rumex and Polygonum, as well as Japanese knotweed.

== Taxonomy ==
Polygonaceae are very well-defined and have long been universally recognized. In the APG III system, the family is placed in the order Caryophyllales. Within the order, it lies outside of the large clade known as the core Caryophyllales. It is a sister to the family Plumbaginaceae, which it does not resemble morphologically.

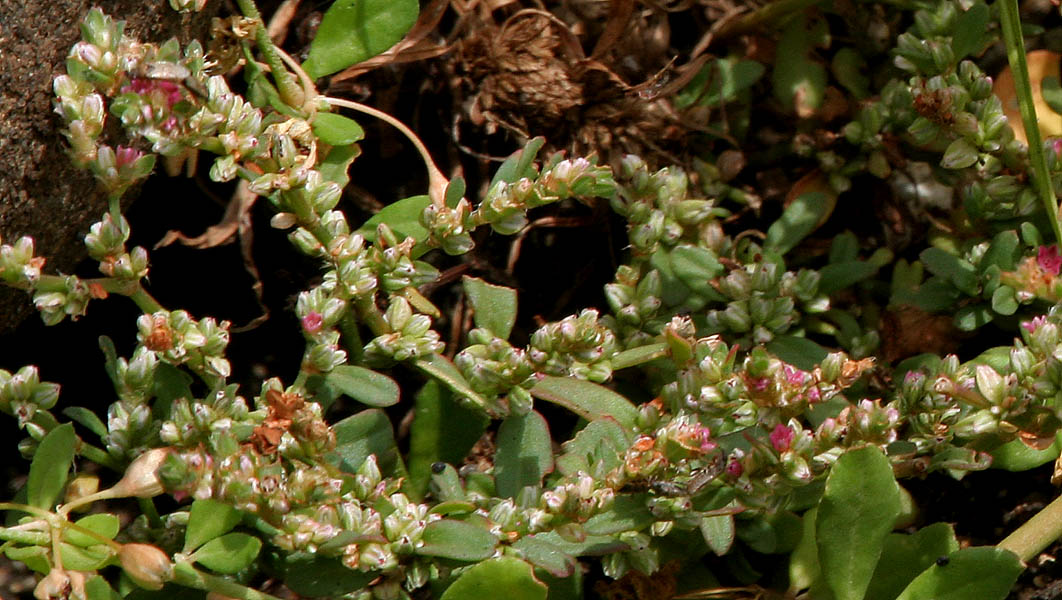
Polygonum plebeium or small knotweed

The last comprehensive revision of the family was published in 1993 by John Brandbyge as part of The Families and Genera of Vascular Plants. Brandbyge followed earlier systems of plant classification in dividing Polygonaceae into two subfamilies, Eriogonoideae and Polygonoideae. Since 1993, the circumscriptions of these two subfamilies have been changed in light of phylogenetic studies of DNA sequences. Genera related to Coccoloba and Triplaris were moved from Polygonoideae to Eriogonoideae. The genus Symmeria does not belong to either of these subfamilies because it is a sister to the rest of the family. Afrobrunnichia might constitute a new subfamily as well.

Brandbyge wrote descriptions for 43 genera of Polygonaceae in 1993. Since then, a few more genera have been erected, and some segregates of Brunnichia, Eriogonum, and Persicaria have been given generic status in major works. Some of the genera were found not to be monophyletic and their limits have been revised. These include Ruprechtia, Eriogonum, Chorizanthe, Persicaria, Aconogonon, Polygonum, Fallopia, and Muehlenbeckia.

== Description ==
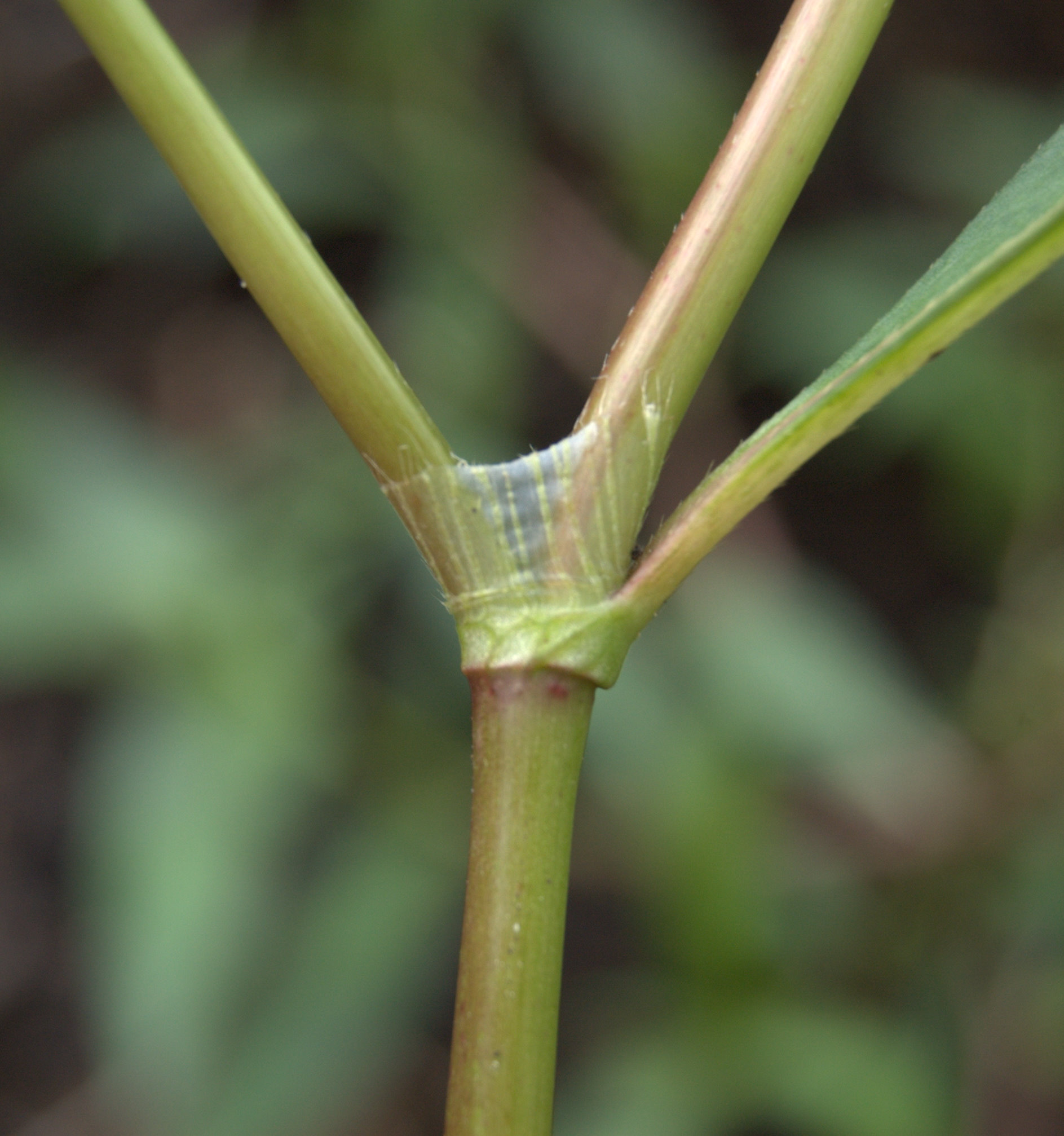
Ochrea of Persicaria maculosa

Most Polygonaceae are perennial herbaceous plants with swollen nodes, but trees, shrubs and vines are also present. The leaves of Polygonaceae are simple, and arranged alternately on the stems. Each leaf has a peculiar pair of fused, sheathing stipules, known as an ochrea. Those species that do not have the nodal ochrea can be identified by their possession of involucrate flower heads. The flowers are normally bisexual, small, and actinomorphic, with a perianth of three to six sepals. After flowering, the sepals often become thickened and enlarged around the developing fruit. Flowers lack a corolla and in some, the sepals are petal-like and colorful. The androecium is composed of three to eight stamens that are normally free or united at the base. The ovary consists of three united carpels that form a single locule, which produces only one ovule. The ovary is superior with basal or free-central placentation. The seeds are usually, but not always, 3-sided. The gynoecium terminates in 1 to 3 styles, each of which ends in a single stigma.

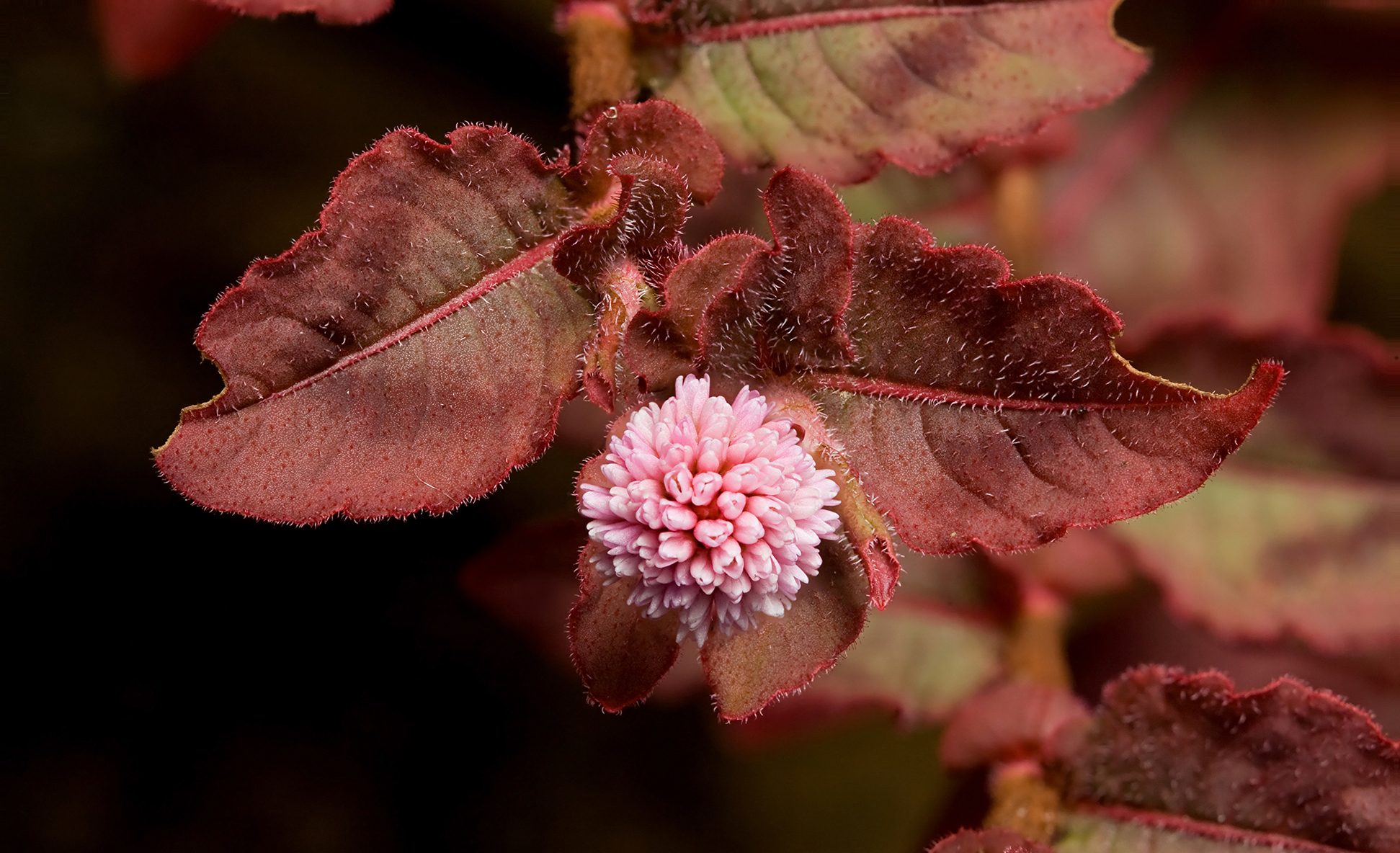
Persicaria capitata or pink knotweed

== Genera ==
As of October 2025, Plants of the World Online accepted 57 genera:

- Acanthoscyphus Small
- Afrobrunnichia Hutch. & Dalziel
- Antigonon Endl.
- Aristocapsa Reveal & Hardham
- Atraphaxis L.
- Bactria Yurtseva & Mavrodiev
- Bistorta (L.) Scop.
- Brunnichia Banks ex Gaertn.
- Caelestium Yurtseva & Mavrodiev
- Calligonum L.
- Centrostegia A.Gray
- Chorizanthe R.Br. ex Benth.
- Coccoloba P.Browne
- Dedeckera Reveal & J.T.Howell
- Dodecahema Reveal & C.B.Hardham
- Duma T.M.Schust.
- Enneatypus Herzog
- Eriogonum Michx.
- Eskemukerjea Malick & Sengupta
- Fagopyrum Mill.
- Fallopia Adans.
- Gilmania Coville
- Goodmania Reveal & Ertter
- Gymnopodium Rolfe
- Harfordia Greene & Parry
- Hollisteria S.Watson
- Johanneshowellia Reveal
- Knorringia (Czukav.) Tzvelev
- Koenigia L.
- Lastarriaea Remy
- Leptogonum Benth.
- Magoniella Adr.Sanchez
- Mucronea Benth.
- Muehlenbeckia Meisn.
- Nemacaulis Nutt.
- Neomillspaughia S.F.Blake
- Oxygonum Burch.
- Oxyria Hill
- Oxytheca Nutt.
- Parogonum (Haraldson) Desjardins & J.P.Bailey
- Persicaria Mill.
- × Persirumex Z.H.Feng (Persicaria × Rumex)
- Pleuropterus Turcz.
- Podopterus Bonpl.
- Polygonum L.
- Pteropyrum Jaub. & Spach
- Pterostegia Fisch. & C.A.Mey.
- Pteroxygonum Dammer & Diels
- × Reyllopia Holub
- Reynoutria Houtt.
- Rheum L.
- Rumex L.
- Ruprechtia C.A.Mey.
- Salta Adr.Sanchez
- Sidotheca Reveal
- Stenogonum Nutt.
- Symmeria Benth.
- Systenotheca Reveal & Hardham
- Triplaris Loefl.

=== Former genera ===
- Aconogonon (Meisn.) Rchb. – now included in Koenigia
- Harpagocarpus Hutch. & Dandy - synonym of Fagopyrum
- Homalocladium (F.Muell.) L.H.Bailey – now included in Muehlenbeckia
- Parapteropyrum A.J.Li – now included in Fagopyrum
- Peutalis Raf. – synonym of Persicaria
- Polygonella Michx. – now included in Polygonum
- Rubrivena M.Král – now included in Koenigia

== Phylogeny ==
The following phylogenetic tree is based on two papers on the molecular phylogenetics of Polygonaceae.

- Polygonaceae
  - Symmeria
  - - Afrobrunnichia
    - Eriogonoideae
      - - Brunnichia
        - Antigonon
      - - - Neomillspaughia
          - Coccoloba
        - Podopterus
        - Leptogonum
        - - Ruprechtia
          - Triplaris
        - - Gymnopodium
          - - Gilmania
            - - Pterostegia
              - - Eriogonum
                - Chorizanthe
    - Polygonoideae
      - - Persicaria
        - - - Bistorta
            - Rubrivena
          - - Aconogonon
            - Koenigia
      - - Fagopyrum (including Parapteropyrum)
        - - Calligonum
          - Pteropyrum
          - Pteroxygonum
        - - Oxyria
          - Rheum
          - Rumex (including Emex)
        - - Knorringia
          - - - Atraphaxis
              - Polygonella
              - Polygonum
            - - Reynoutria
              - Fallopia
              - Muehlenbeckia
