= Knotweed =

Knotweed is a common name for plants in several genera in the family Polygonaceae. Knotweed may refer to:

- Fallopia
- Persicaria
- Polygonum
- Reynoutria
  - Reynoutria japonica or Japanese knotweed, a highly invasive species in Europe and North America

== See also ==
- Knotgrass
