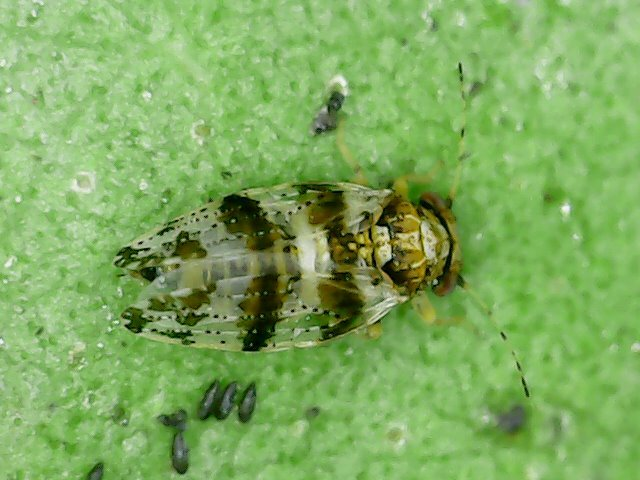

Scientific classification
- Kingdom: Animalia
- Phylum: Arthropoda
- Clade: Pancrustacea
- Class: Insecta
- Order: Hemiptera
- Suborder: Sternorrhyncha
- Family: Aphalaridae
- Genus: Aphalara
- Species: A. itadori

Binomial name
- Aphalara itadori (Shinji, 1938)

Synonyms
- Psylla itadori Shinji, 1938

= Aphalara itadori =

Species of true bug

Aphalara itadori, the Japanese knotweed psyllid, is a species of psyllid from Japan which feeds on Japanese knotweed (Reynoutria japonica).

The UK Government licensed the use of this species as a biological control to counter the spread of Japanese knotweed in England. This was the first time that a non-native species was approved for such use in the European Union.

== Taxonomy ==
The specific name comes from the Japanese name for Japanese knotweed.

=== Strains ===
The southern strain of Aphalara itadori is from Kyushu and is the strain released in the UK. Its home range is the Kumamoto prefecture, of the Kyushu Island, in southern Japan. The southern strain attacks Japanese and Bohemian knotweed.

The northern strain of Aphalara itadori comes from the northern island of Hokkaido in Japan. This Hokkaido strain targets giant knotweed which can be found almost exclusively on the island of Hokkaido.

When the strains are crossed the Aphalara itadori individuals target all three species of knotweed (Giant, Japanese, and Himalayan).

== Distribution ==
Knotweed species' native home range is Asia. They were introduced to North America and Europe in the 1800s. Knotweed was carried from Asia to be used as an ornamental. Since these introductions knotweed species have spread throughout North America, Canada and Europe to establish themselves as a noxious weed.

== Behavior and ecology ==
=== Breeding ===
Aphalara itadori grows from egg to adult in 5 nymph phases over 33 days at 23 °C (73 °F). Overwintering adults survive in conifer tree bark. Once females are fully grown they can produce a mean of 637 eggs ± 121.96(±1SE, n = 11) with a mean period of production at 37.5 days ± 5.85 days (±1SE, n = 11). Adult psyllids can live up to 67 days.

=== Feeding ===
Aphalara itadori specializes in feeding on Japanese knotweed, Fallopia spp., giant knotweed, Bohemian knotweed and Himalayan knotweed—the hybrid of giant and Japanese knotweed.

== Effects on knotweed ==
Presently, 180 species of arthropod exist that exhibit a predatorial behavior to Fallopia spp. Fallopia spp. are species of concern due to their aggressive nature and destruction they cause to natural environments. Specifically, knotweed species have been seen to disrupt riparian habitats and lead to the degradation of waterways they invade.

Currently, Aphalara itadori is the only arthropod that has been extensively studied and proven to possess qualities needed in an effective biological control agent for the control of invasive knotweed species. This is why it has been approved for release in the European Union. A four-year study in England and Wales found that the insects limited the growth of knotweed and did not breed successfully on ninety nearby native species, including the related species rhubarb, although it was not clear whether the insect colonies would be able to survive over the winter.

After extensive research, Aphalara itadori has been shown to defoliate knotweed species substantially. The psyllid individuals feed on the knotweed's meristem. As a result of this feeding the leaves are left twisted and bound together. The deformity caused by Aphalara itadori feeding reduces the photosynthetic rate, competitive ability, growth, and total leaf area. They deplete the energy supply of knotweed reducing the growth and root storage. This damage prevents the knotweed from growing back.

Studies have indicated that A. itadori release would result in extensive Fallopia spp. defoliation on above and below-ground biomass. Grevstad et al., 2013, showed more than a 50% reduction in biomass after 50 days on F. sachalinensis and F. x bohemica. However, A release would not be entirely risk free. Some individuals of A. itadori displayed characteristics of an ability to adapt and grow on non-target plants. However, the fitness level of these individuals was near zero and may result in behavioral avoidance instead.
