= Itadori =

Itadori (虎杖, イタドリ) is the common name of Reynoutria japonica in Japanese.

Itadori may also refer to:

== Animals ==
- Aphalara itadori, a psyllid that eats Reynoutria japonica

== Fictional characters ==
- Yuji Itadori, the main protagonist of Jujutsu Kaisen, named after Reynoutria japonica

== Geography ==
- Itadori, Gifu, former village in Gifu prefecture, Japan
- Itadori River, a river in Gifu prefecture, Japan
