= Helxine =

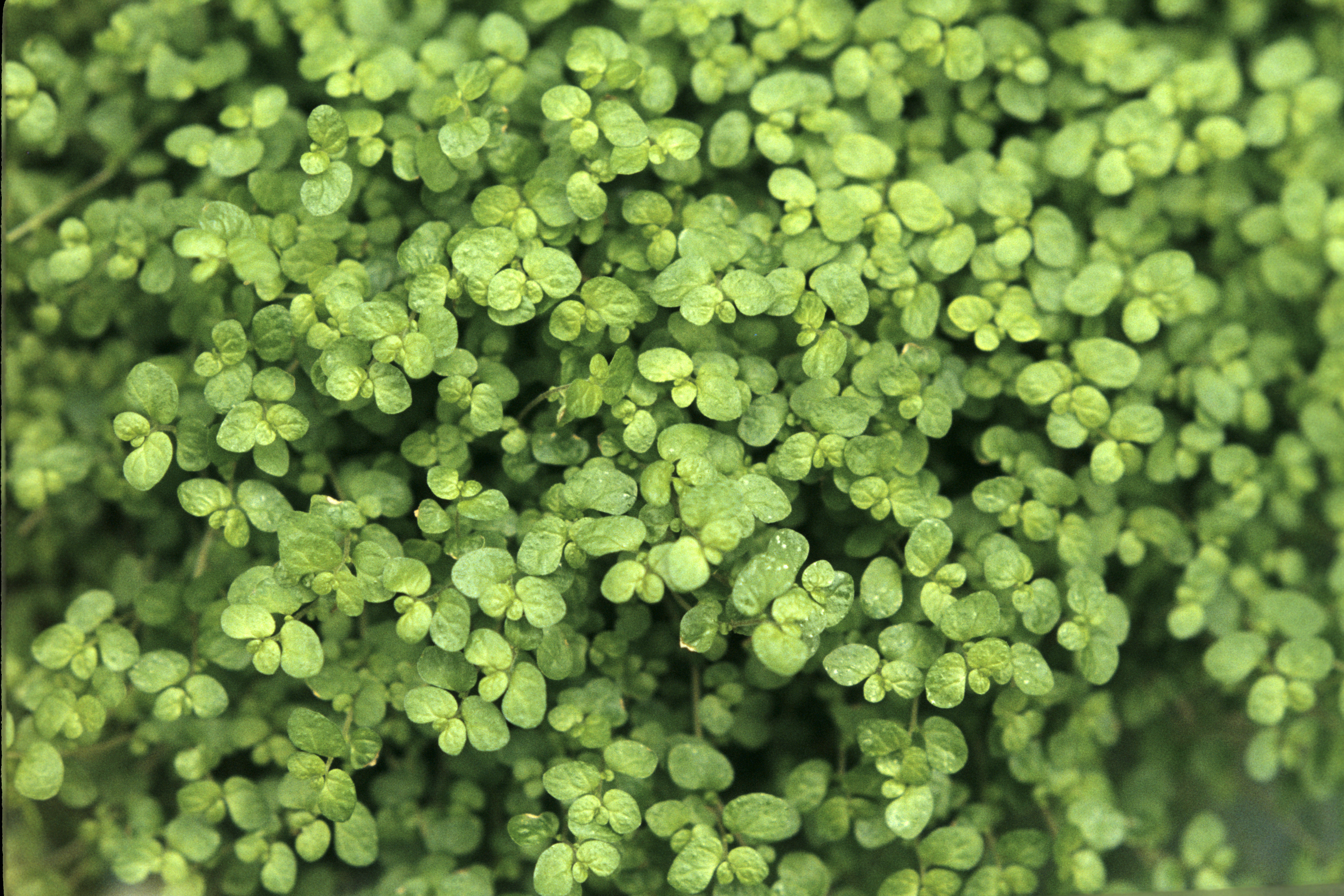
Helxine

Helxine may refer to:

- a genus of plants in the nettle family Urticaceae containing a single species, Helxine soleirolii, a synonym of Soleirolia soleirolii
- a genus of plants in the knotweed family Polygonaceae, including the following species
  - Helxine convolvulus, a synonym of Fallopia convolvulus
  - Helxine multiflorum, a synonym of Reynoutria multiflora
  - Helxine scandens, a synonym of Fallopia scandens
  - Helxine saggitatum, a synonym of Persicaria sagittata
