= Coleophora pratella =

Scientific classification
- Kingdom: Animalia
- Phylum: Arthropoda
- Clade: Pancrustacea
- Class: Insecta
- Order: Lepidoptera
- Family: Coleophoridae
- Genus: Coleophora
- Species: C. pratella

Binomial name
- Coleophora pratella Zeller, 1871

Species of moth

Coleophora pratella is a moth of the family Coleophoridae. It is found from France and Belgium to Latvia, Lithuania, Poland, Romania and Bulgaria and from Germany to Italy, Austria and Hungary.

The larvae feed on Polygonum bistorta, Fallopia dumetorum and Fallopia convolvulus. They feed on the generative organs of their host plant.
