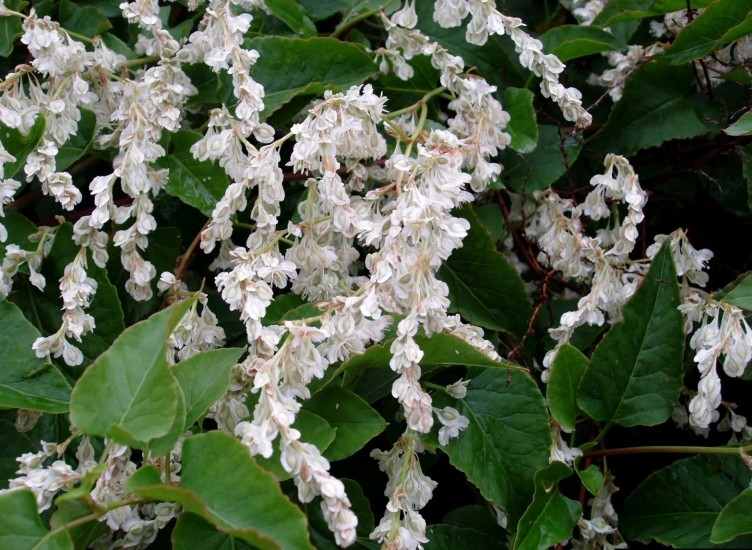

Scientific classification
- Kingdom: Plantae
- Clade: Tracheophytes
- Clade: Angiosperms
- Clade: Eudicots
- Order: Caryophyllales
- Family: Polygonaceae
- Genus: Fallopia
- Species: F. baldschuanica

Binomial name
- Fallopia baldschuanica (Regel) Holub

Synonyms
- List: Bilderdykia baldschuanica (Regel) D.A.Webb; Fagopyrum baldschuanicum (Regel) Gross; Polygonum baldschuanicum Regel; Reynoutria baldschuanica (Regel) Moldenke; Tiniaria baldschuanica (Regel) Hedberg ex Janch.

= Fallopia baldschuanica =

Plant species in the buckwheat family

Fallopia baldschuanica (syn. Polygonum baldschuanicum) is an Asian species of flowering plant in the knotweed family known by several common names, including Russian-vine, Bukhara fleeceflower, Chinese fleecevine, mile-a-minute and silver lace vine. It is native to the southern Asia west of the Himalayas and is growing wild in parts of Europe, Africa, and the United States as an introduced species.

Fallopia baldschuanica is grown as an ornamental plant for its flower-laced vines. The white flowers are decorative and provide nectar and pollen for the honey bee. As it is fast-growing, it is used as cover for unsightly fences and other garden structures. It can become invasive, however.

The specific name baldschuanica 'from Baldzhuan' refers to the area of the city of Baldzhuan, in Tadjikistan.

== Description ==
Fallopia baldschuanica is a vining plant with woody, climbing stems at least 10 metres (33 ft) in length. The pointed oval or nearly triangular leaves are up to 10 centimetres (4 in) long and borne on petioles. The inflorescence is an open array of narrow, branching, drooping or spreading clusters of white flowers, each cluster reaching a maximum of 15 centimetres (6 in) long. Flowers hang on short pedicels. Each five-lobed flower is just under a centimeter long and white to greenish or pale pink, sometimes turning bright pink as the fruit develops. The fruit is a shiny black achene about 2 millimetres (5/64 in) wide.

== Taxonomy ==
Fallopia baldschuanica was first described as a species in the Polygonum genus named Polygonum baldschuanicum in 1884 by Eduard August von Regel. Many other classifications have been published, but the placement in Fallopia by botanist Josef Ludwig Holub in 1971 is the accepted classification. Alongside the rest of the genus it is part of the Polygonaceae family and has no subspecies. Although Plants of the World Online (POWO) lists it as a separate species from Fallopia aubertii native to China, there are botanists to prefer to combine the species under F. baldschuanica.

According to POWO the species has five homotypic synonyms.

Table of Synonyms
Name	Year
Bilderdykia baldschuanica (Regel) D.A.Webb	1963
Fagopyrum baldschuanicum (Regel) Gross	1913
Polygonum baldschuanicum Regel	1884
Reynoutria baldschuanica (Regel) Moldenke	1941
Tiniaria baldschuanica (Regel) Hedberg ex Janch.	1950

== Range ==
Silver lace vines are native to three counties in southern Asia, Tadzhikistan, Afghanistan, and Pakistan. In Europe it is established from Albania and Romania in the south through Norway and Sweden. Although absent from France and Italy, it also has escaped cultivation in Spain and the British Isles. In Africa it has been recorded in Eritrea, Kenya, Tunisia, and Zimbabwe, as well as the Canary Islands in the Atlantic. In North America it has become established in seven states east of the Mississippi, Alabama, Massachusetts, Michigan, New Jersey, New York, Pennsylvania, and Virginia, and five western US States, California, Colorado, New Mexico, Utah, and Washington.

== See also ==
- Japanese knotweed
