= Coleophora cecidophorella =

Scientific classification
- Kingdom: Animalia
- Phylum: Arthropoda
- Class: Insecta
- Order: Lepidoptera
- Family: Coleophoridae
- Genus: Coleophora
- Species: C. cecidophorella

Binomial name
- Coleophora cecidophorella Oudejans, 1972

Synonyms
- Coleophora icterella Toll, 1949

Species of moth

Coleophora cecidophorella is a moth of the family Coleophoridae. It is found in France, Italy, Austria, Slovenia, Croatia, the Czech Republic, Slovakia, Hungary, Romania and Ukraine.

The larvae feed on Fallopia convolvulus and Fallopia dumetorum. They create a gall on the fruit of their host plant.
