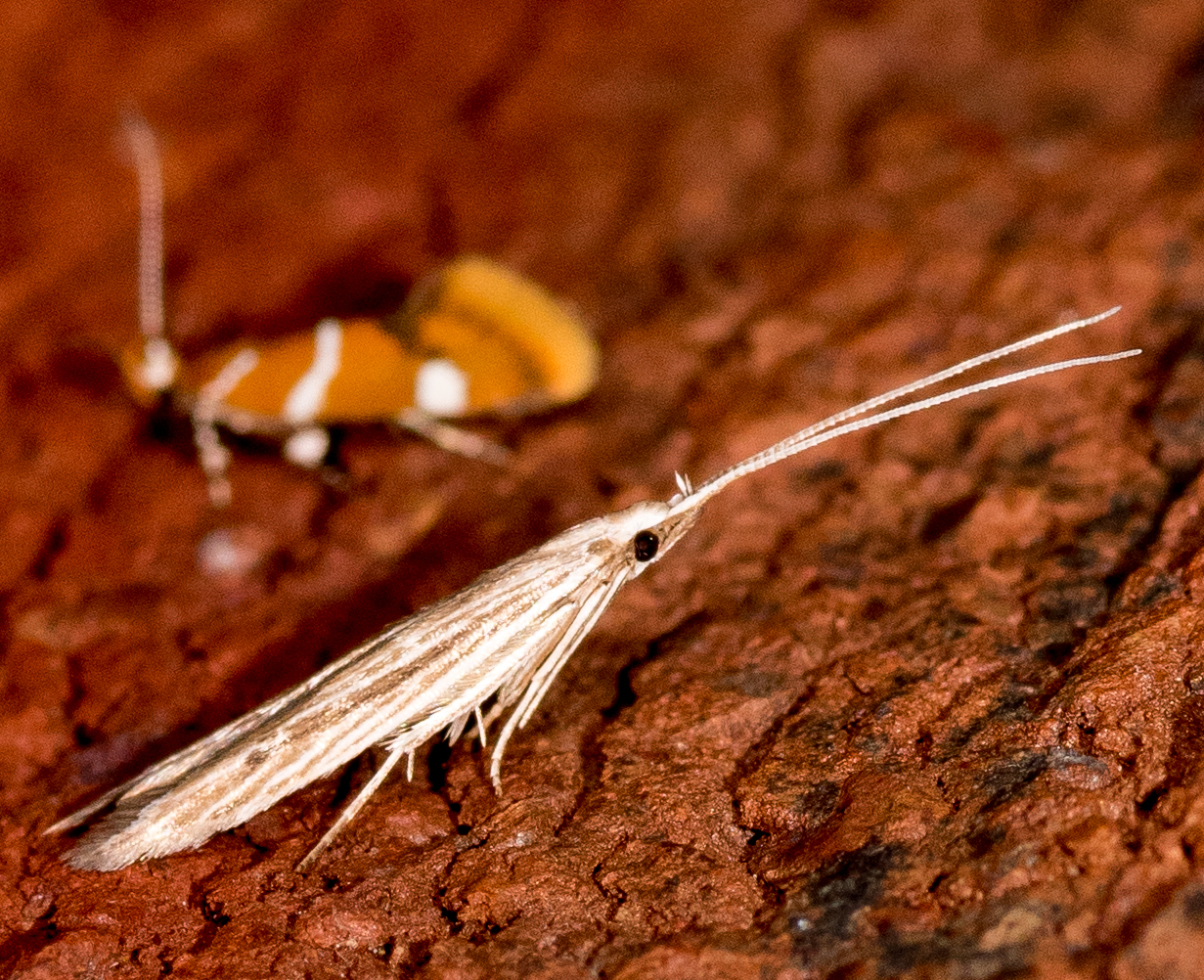
- Adult

Scientific classification
- Kingdom: Animalia
- Phylum: Arthropoda
- Clade: Pancrustacea
- Class: Insecta
- Order: Lepidoptera
- Family: Coleophoridae
- Genus: Coleophora
- Species: C. borea

Binomial name
- Coleophora borea Braun, 1921

= Coleophora borea =

Species of moth

Coleophora borea is a species of moth in the family Coleophoridae. It is found in the United States, including Ohio.

The larvae feed on the seeds of Fallopia scandens. They create a trivalved, tubular silken case.
