= Fallopia ciliinervis =

Scientific classification
- Kingdom: Plantae
- Clade: Tracheophytes
- Clade: Angiosperms
- Clade: Eudicots
- Order: Caryophyllales
- Family: Polygonaceae
- Genus: Fallopia
- Species: F. ciliinervis

Binomial name
- Fallopia ciliinervis (Nakai) K.Hammer

Synonyms
- Fallopia multiflora var. ciliinervis (Nakai) Yonek. & H.Ohashi; Pleuropterus ciliinervis Nakai; Polygonum ciliinerve (Nakai) Ohwi; Polygonum multiflorum var. ciliinerve (Nakai) Steward; Reynoutria ciliinervis (Nakai) Moldenke

Species of flowering plant

Fallopia ciliinervis is a species of flowering plant in the family Polygonaceae. It is a climbing perennial native to Korea and China – north-central China, south-central China, northeast China (Manchuria) and Qinghai. It was first described as Pleuropterus ciliinervis by Takenoshin Nakai in 1914. It was transferred to Fallopia by Karl Hammer in 1986. It has also been placed in Reynoutria and Polygonum.
