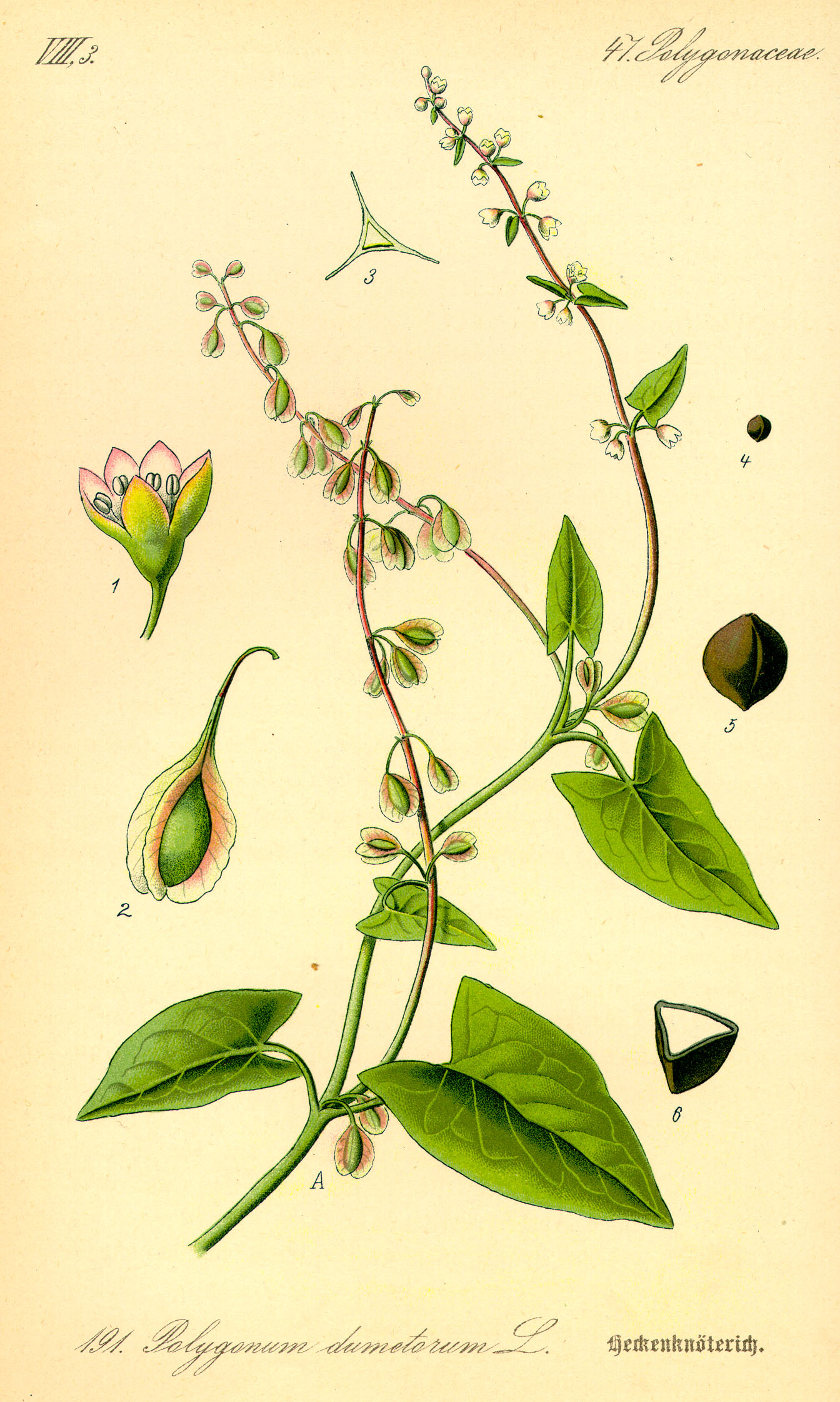
- 1885 illustration of Fallopia dumetorum

Scientific classification
- Kingdom: Plantae
- Clade: Tracheophytes
- Clade: Angiosperms
- Clade: Eudicots
- Order: Caryophyllales
- Family: Polygonaceae
- Subfamily: Polygonoideae
- Genus: Fallopia; Adans., not Lour.

Type species
- Polygonum scandens L.

Synonyms
- Bilderdykia Dumort.; Helxine Raf.; Tiniaria (Meisn.) Rchb.

= Fallopia =

Genus of flowering plants in the knotweed family

Fallopia is a genus of about 12 species of flowering plants in the buckwheat family, in the past often included in a wider treatment of the related genus Polygonum, and previously including Reynoutria. The genus is native to temperate and subtropical regions of the Northern Hemisphere, but species have been introduced elsewhere. The genus includes species forming vines and shrubs.

== Description ==
Species of Fallopia grow as vines, lianas, shrubs or subshrubs. Unlike species of the related genus Duma, they do not have thornlike tips to their branches. Nectaries are present outside the flowers (extrafloral). Plants usually have bisexual flowers. More rarely they may be dioecious, each plant only having flowers with either functional stamens or a functional pistil. The flowers are arranged in a raceme. The tepals of the flowers are dry and paper-like when mature. The flowers have short styles with partially fused stigmas forming a "head". The fruits are achenes with three sharp edges.

== Taxonomy ==
The genus Fallopia was first described by Michel Adanson in 1763. He distinguished it from Polygonum and other genera he placed in his family "Persicariae". Adanson did not explain the origin of the name. It is said to be named after the Italian botanist Gabriele Falloppio, known as Fallopius in Latin. He was the superintendent of the botanical garden at Padua and an acclaimed anatomist, being considered a founder of modern anatomy.

The status of the genus has varied considerably over time, and its taxonomic history is complicated. For example, Meissner in 1856 placed both Adanson's Fallopia and the genus Reynoutria in a broadly defined Polygonum, as did Bentham and Hooker in 1880. When the genus Fallopia was recognized, as was generally the case from the 1970s onwards, Reynoutria was sometimes included and sometimes not. Thus the Flora of North America in 2005 included Reynoutria in Fallopia, whereas the Flora of China in 2003 separated the two genera. Subsequent molecular phylogenetic studies have confirmed the separation of Fallopia from other related genera.

=== Classification and phylogeny ===
Fallopia is placed in the tribe Polygoneae of the subfamily Polygonoideae. Within the tribe, it is most closely related to the genera Reynoutria and Muehlenbeckia, forming the so-called "RMF clade".

- Polygoneae
  - Knorringia
  - - - Polygonum ciliinode (syn. Fallopia ciliinodis)
      - DAP clade
        - Duma
        - - Atraphaxis
          - Polygonum
    - RMF clade
      - Reynoutria
      - - Muehlenbeckia
        - Fallopia s.s.

=== Species ===
As of October 2025, Plants of the World Online accepted 12 species.

- Fallopia aubertii (L.Henry) Holub – silver lace vine; China
- Fallopia baldschuanica (Regel) Holub (syn. Polygonum baldschuanicum) – Russian vine, mile-a-minute vine, fleece vine, fleece flower; Eastern Asia
- Fallopia ciliinervis (Nakai) K.Hammer – China and Korea
- Fallopia convolvulus (L.) Á.Löve (syns Polygonum convolvulus, Bilderdykia convolvulus) – black-bindweed; Europe, Asia, northern Africa.
- Fallopia cristata (Engelm. ex A.Gray) Holub – eastern and central United States
- Fallopia dentatoalata (F.Schmidt) Holub (syn. Polygonum dentatoalatum) – Eastern Asia
- Fallopia dumetorum (L.) Holub (syns Polygonum dumetorum, Bilderdykia dumetorum) – copse bindweed, small-flower knotweed; Europe, Asia, northern Africa
- Fallopia filipes (H.Hara) Holub – Nepal
- Fallopia × heterocarpa (Beck) Doweld (F. convolvulus × F. dumetorum) – France to central Europe
- Fallopia koreana B.U.Oh & J.G.Kim – Korean knotweed; Korea
- Fallopia pterocarpa (Meisn.) Holub (syn. Polygonum pterocarpum) – Southern Asia
- Fallopia scandens (L.) Holub (syns Polygonum scandens, Reynoutria scandens) – climbing false buckwheat; North America
- Fallopia schischkinii Tzvelev – Russian Far East

=== Former species ===
Many species at one time placed in Fallopia have been moved to other genera in the subfamily Polygonoideae. Some synonyms are listed below.

- Fallopia × bohemica → Reynoutria × bohemica, Bohemian knotweed.
- Fallopia ciliinodis (Michx.) Holub – fringed black bindweed → Polygonum ciliinode
- Fallopia cynanchoides (Hemsl.) Haraldson → Parogonum cynanchoides (Hemsl.) Desjardins & J.P.Bailey
- Fallopia denticulata (C.C.Huang) Holub → Pteroxygonum denticulatum
- Fallopia japonica Houtt. – Japanese knotweed → Reynoutria japonica
- Fallopia sachalinensis – giant knotweed → Reynoutria sachalinensis

=== Hybrids ===
Crosses between Japanese knotweed and giant knotweed have occurred where the two species grow in close proximity. The hybrid, ×Reyllopia conollyana (J.P.Bailey) Galasso (Reynoutria japonica × Fallopia baldschuanica) is called railway-yard knotweed.

== Distribution ==
Fallopia species are native to much of the Northern Hemisphere, including most of Eurasia, North Africa and central and eastern North America. They have been widely introduced elsewhere including eastern and southern Africa, eastern North America, including Mexico, and parts of South America.

== Ecology ==
Fallopia species are used as food plants by the larvae of some Lepidoptera species including Coleophora therinella (recorded on F. convolvulus).
