= Parogonum =

Scientific classification
- Kingdom: Plantae
- Clade: Tracheophytes
- Clade: Angiosperms
- Clade: Eudicots
- Order: Caryophyllales
- Family: Polygonaceae
- Genus: Parogonum (Haraldson) Desjardins & J.P.Bailey (2023)

Species
- Parogonum ciliinode (Michx.) Desjardins & J.P.Bailey; Parogonum cynanchoides (Hemsl.) Desjardins & J.P.Bailey

Genus of flowering plants

Parogonum is a genus of flowering plants in the family Polygonaceae. It includes two species, one native to eastern North America and the other to central China.

- Parogonum ciliinode (Michx.) Desjardins & J.P.Bailey – central and eastern Canada to the eastern United States
- Parogonum cynanchoides (Hemsl.) Desjardins & J.P.Bailey – central China and Tibet
