= Knotgrass =

Knotgrass or knot grass is the common name for several plants and a moth and may refer to:

- Paspalum distichum, a species of grass
- Polygonum, a genus of plants in the buckwheat family, more often known as knot weed
- Acronicta rumicis, a moth of the family Noctuidae

== See also ==
- Knotweed
