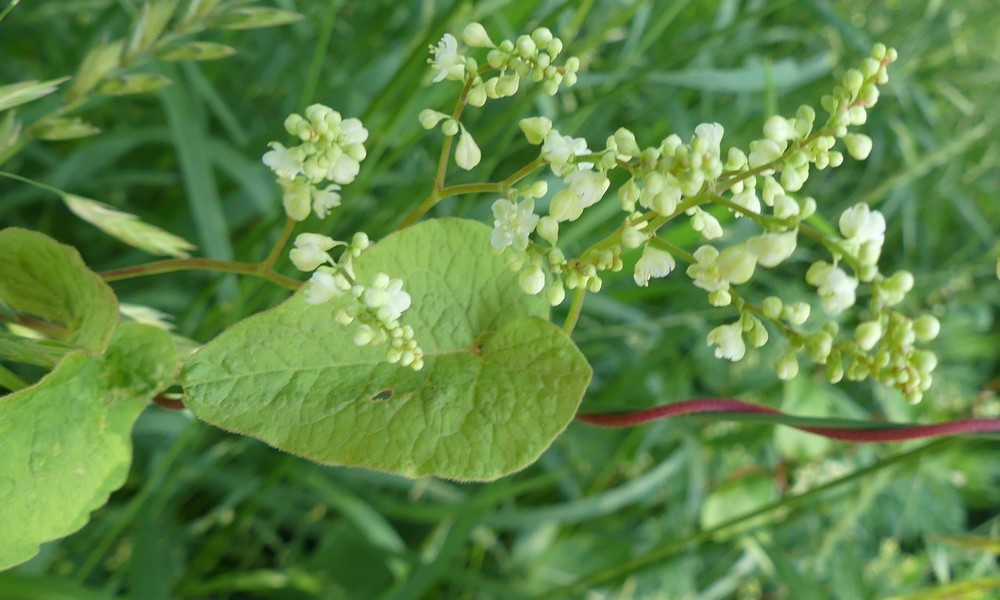

Scientific classification
- Kingdom: Plantae
- Clade: Tracheophytes
- Clade: Angiosperms
- Clade: Eudicots
- Order: Caryophyllales
- Family: Polygonaceae
- Genus: Parogonum
- Species: P. ciliinode

Binomial name
- Parogonum ciliinode (Michx.) Desjardins & J.P.Bailey

Synonyms
- Bilderdykia ciliinodis (Michx.) Greene; Fallopia ciliinodis (Michx.) Holub; Polygonum ciliinode Michx.; Polygonum convolvulus var. ciliinode (Michx.) Alph.Wood; Reynoutria ciliinodis (Michx.) Shinners; Tiniaria ciliinodis (Michx.) Small

= Parogonum ciliinode =

Plant species in the buckwheat family

Parogonum ciliinode (synonym Fallopia ciliinodis) is a species of flowering plant in the buckwheat family, native to central and eastern Canada, and the north-central and eastern United States. The specific epithet is also spelt cilinode.

== Taxonomy ==
The species was first described by André Michaux in 1803. Michaux spelt the epithet "cilinode". Article 60 of the International Code of Nomenclature for algae, fungi, and plants requires the correction of improperly formed "compounding forms", and the International Plant Names Index has corrected it to "ciliinode".

However, like many species in the family Polygonaceae, it has been placed in different genera within this group, including in Fallopia and Reynoutria. A 2015 molecular phylogenetic study (in which the species was treated as Fallopia cilinodis) found that it was weakly supported as a sister to the "DAP clade" (see the following cladogram), although plastid data alone placed it in the "RMF clade". The presence of extra-floral nectaries in Polygonum ciliinode suggests a relationship with the RMF clade, as this is one of the characteristics of the clade. Its relationships remain unsettled; it may represent an as-yet-unrecognized lineage in the Polygoneae. In 2023 it was moved to Parogonum by Stuart David Desjardins and John Paul Bailey. This is the accepted name according to Plants of the World Online.
