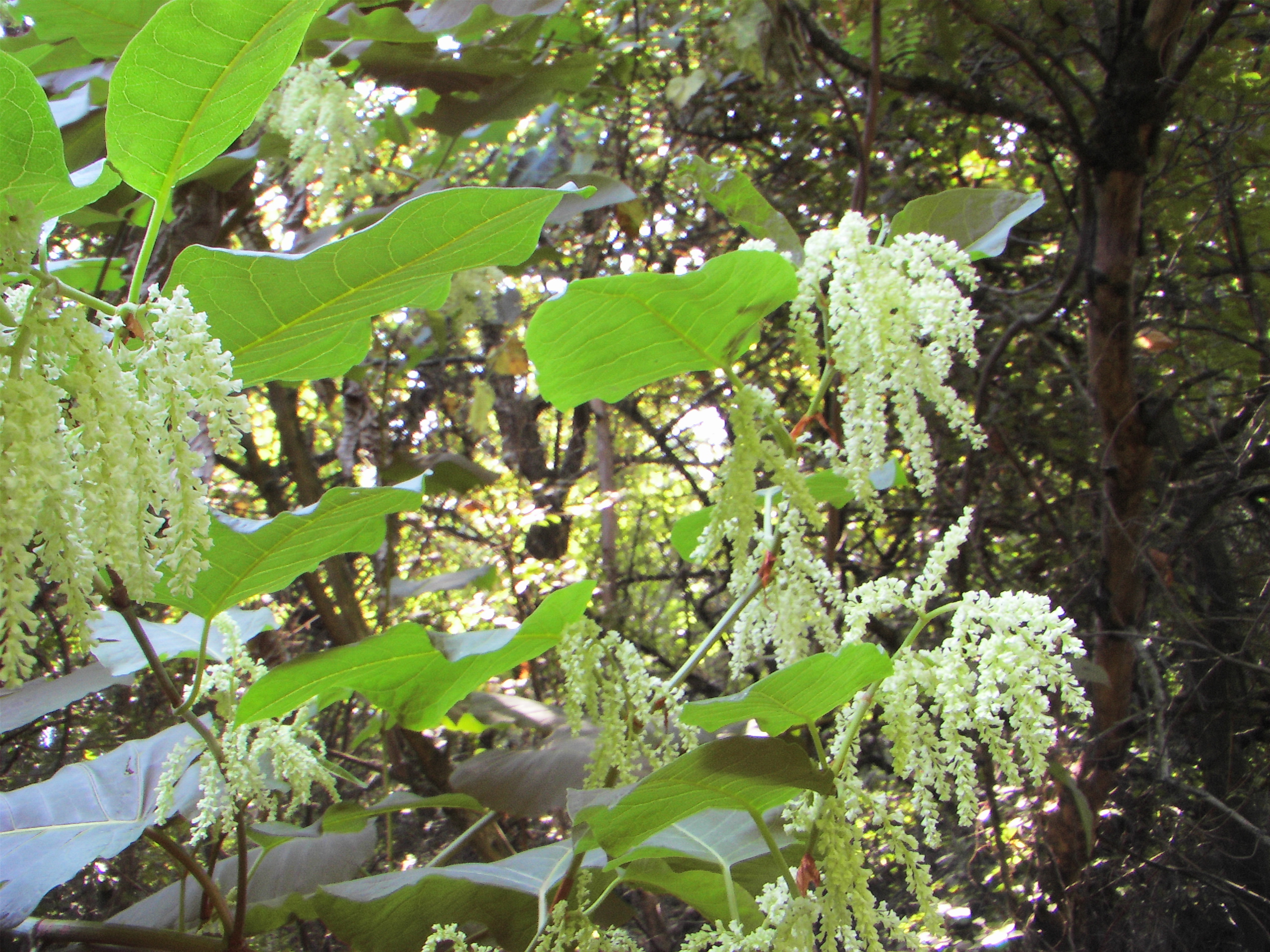

Scientific classification
- Kingdom: Plantae
- Clade: Embryophytes
- Clade: Tracheophytes
- Clade: Angiosperms
- Clade: Eudicots
- Order: Caryophyllales
- Family: Polygonaceae
- Genus: Reynoutria
- Species: R. sachalinensis

Binomial name
- Reynoutria sachalinensis (F.Schmidt) Nakai

Synonyms
- Polygonum sachalinense F.Schmidt 1859; Fallopia sachalinensis Ronse Decr.; Reynoutria brachyphylla (Honda) Nakai; Tiniaria sachalinensis (F. Schmidt) Janch.

= Reynoutria sachalinensis =

Species of flowering plant in the knotweed family

Reynoutria sachalinensis, the giant knotweed or Sakhalin knotweed (syns. Polygonum sachalinense, Fallopia sachalinensis), is a species of Fallopia native to northeastern Asia in northern Japan (Hokkaidō, Honshū) and the far east of Russia (Sakhalin and the southern Kurile Islands).

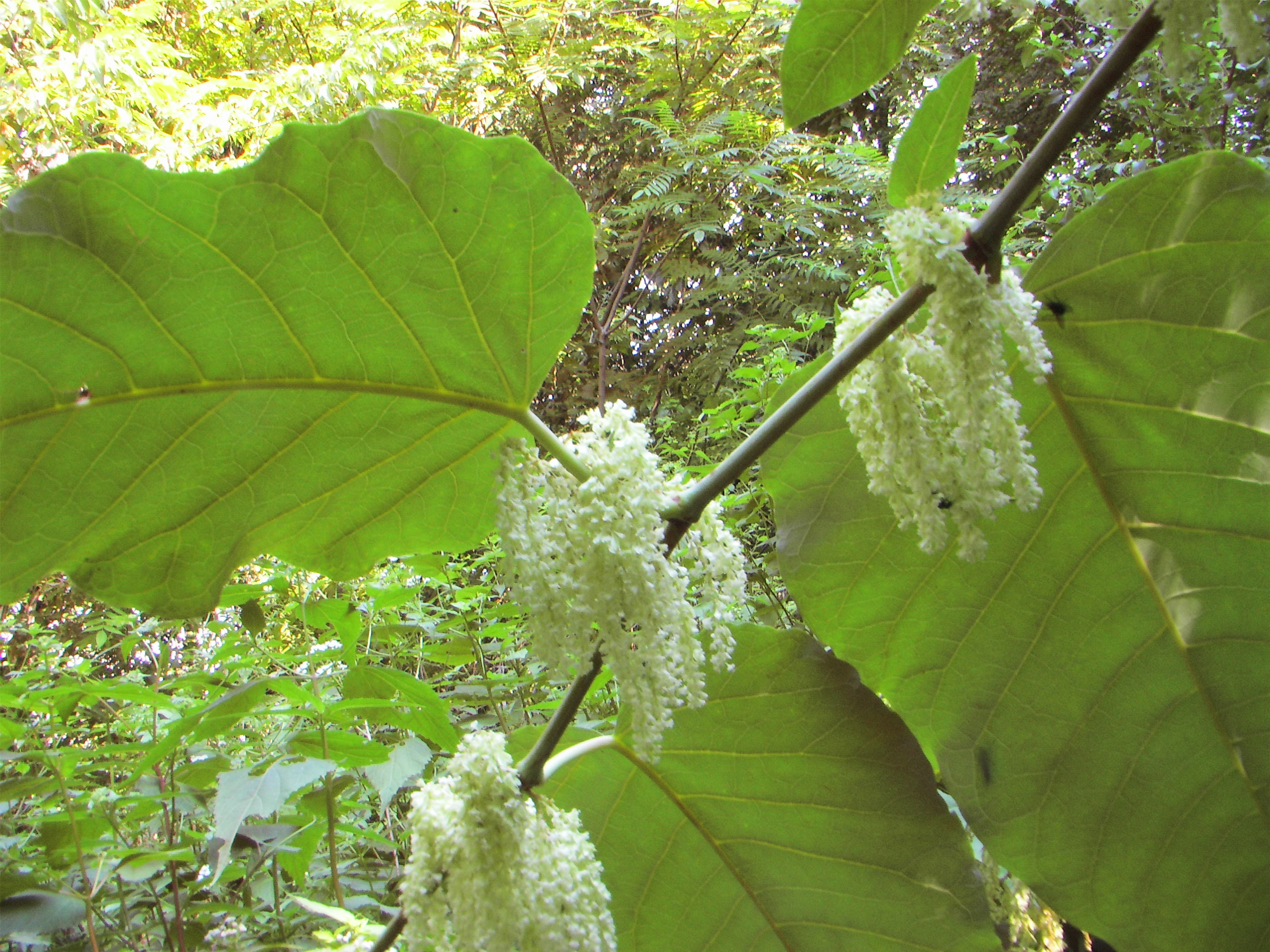
Stem and inflorescence

Reynoutria sachalinensis is a herbaceous perennial plant growing to 2–4 m (79–157 in) tall, with strong, extensively spreading rhizomes forming large clonal colonies. The leaves are some of the largest in the family, up to 15–40 cm (6–15.5 in) long and 10–28 cm (4–11 in) broad, nearly heart-shaped, with a somewhat wavy, crenate margin. The flowers are small, produced on short, dense panicles up to 10 cm (4 in) long in late summer or early autumn; it is gynodioecious, with male and female (male sterile) flowers on separate plants. The species is closely related to the Japanese knotweed, Reynoutria japonica, and can be distinguished from it by its larger size, and in its leaves having a heart-shaped (not straight) base and a crenate margin. Reynoutria sachalinensis has a chromosome count of 2n=44.

== Cultivation and uses ==
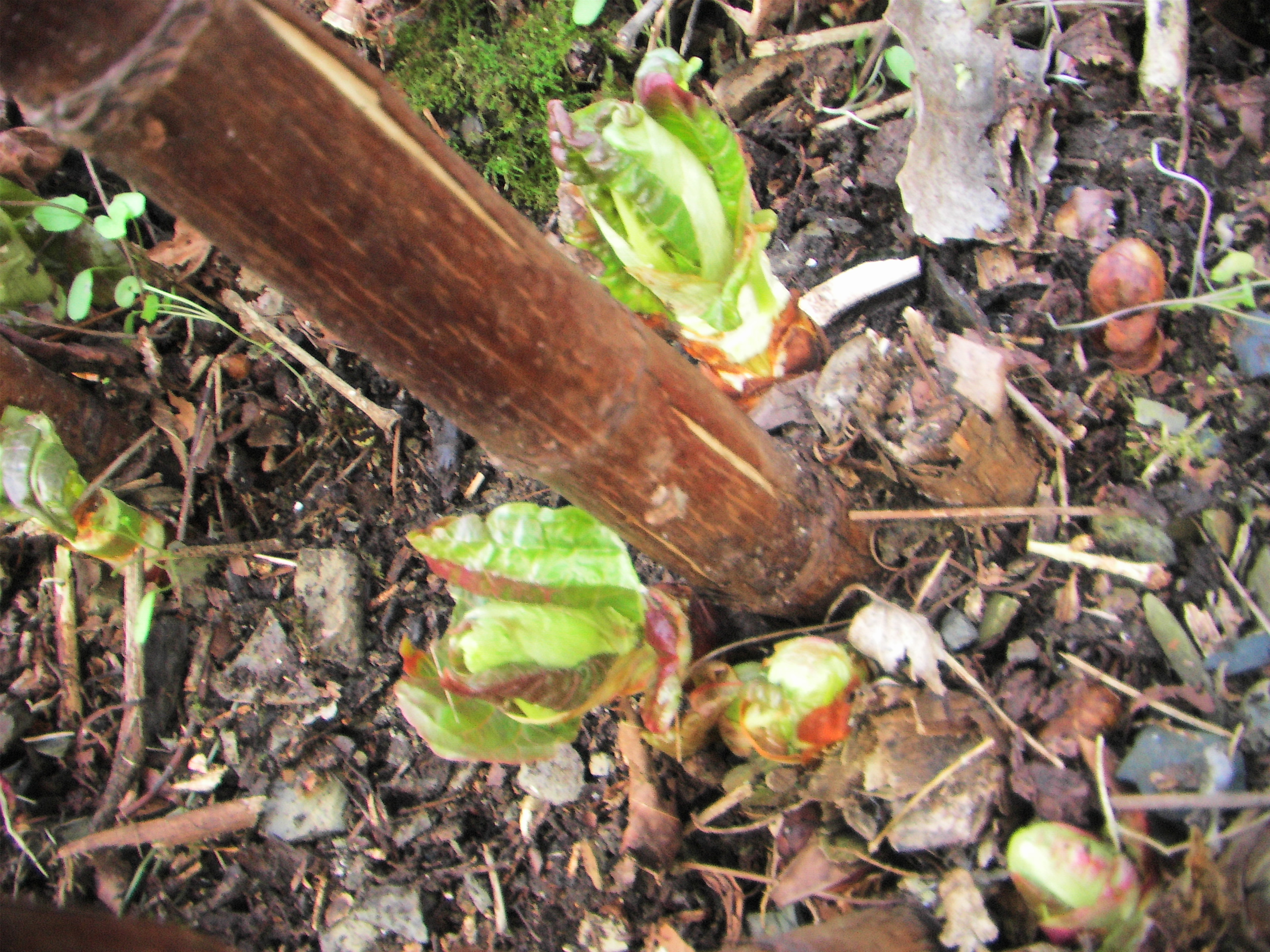
Edible shoots

The shoots are tender and edible. It was introduced to Europe and grown in many botanic gardens. It came prominently into notice about 1893, when a drought in western Europe caused a decided shortage in forage for cattle. This plant was little affected, and since its tender shoots and leaves were eaten by stock, the plant was widely grown experimentally as a forage crop. It has proved less useful than was predicted, and its deliberate cultivation has been almost entirely abandoned. It has, however, like F. japonica, proved to be an invasive weed in several areas.

It has hybridised with Reynoutria japonica in cultivation; the hybrid, Reynoutria × bohemica (Chrtek & Chrtková) J.P.Bailey, is frequently found in the British Isles and elsewhere.

Extracts of this plant can be used as plant protectants for certain fungal and bacterial diseases.

Rhizome of R. sachalinensis is the source of lactoperoxidase peroxidation cycle substrates, which can act as activators and inhibitors of the antimicrobial properties of that system.

The species has been cultivated as an energy crop for biomass production, particularly in Germany in its commercial variety 'Igniscum', and it has shown a high productivity even in Northern latitudes, reaching a dry matter yield from 5.4 to 27.8 oven dry metric tons per hectare (2.4 to 12.4 short ton/acre), annually.
