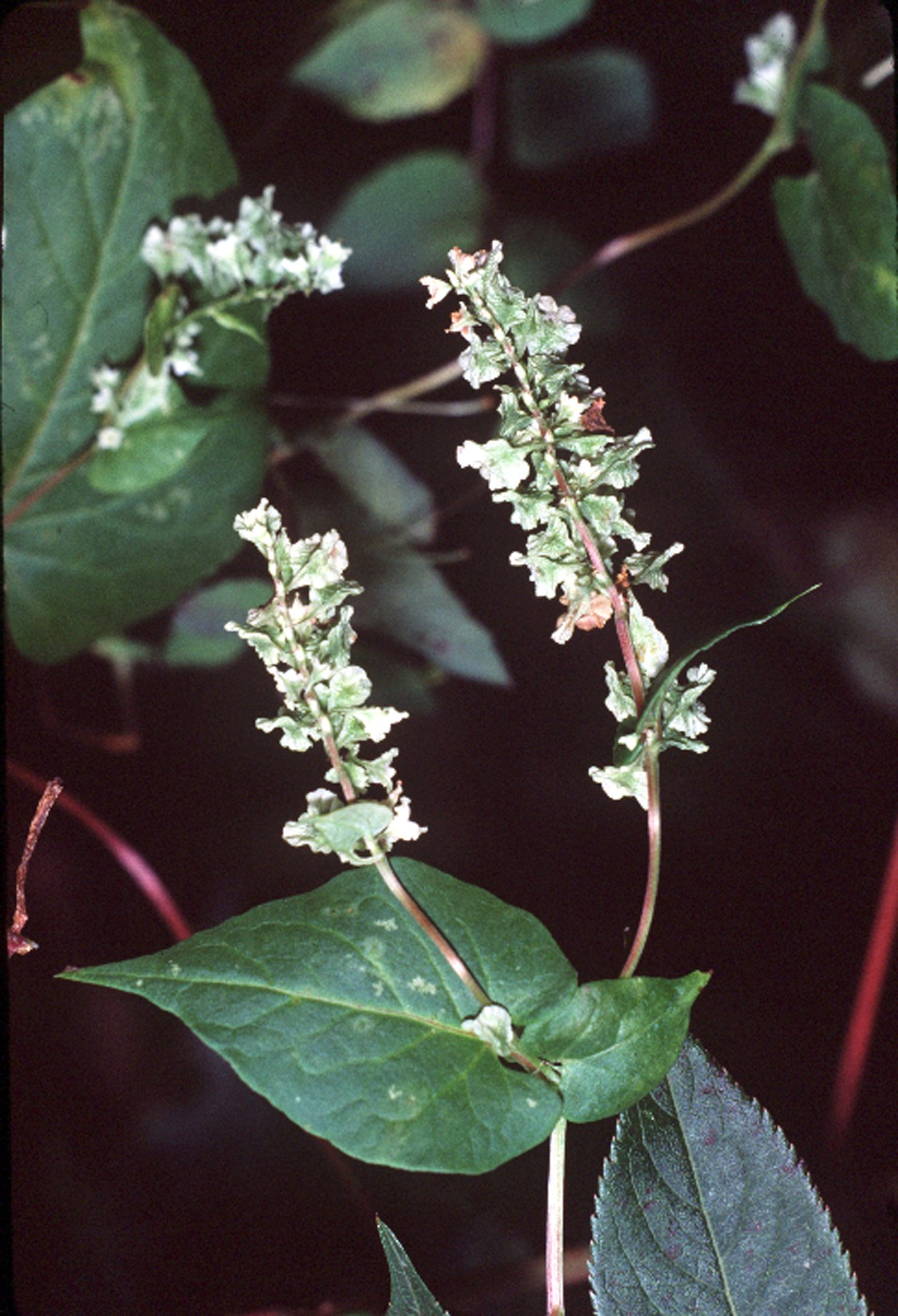

Conservation status
- Secure (NatureServe)

Scientific classification
- Kingdom: Plantae
- Clade: Tracheophytes
- Clade: Angiosperms
- Clade: Eudicots
- Order: Caryophyllales
- Family: Polygonaceae
- Genus: Fallopia
- Species: F. scandens

Binomial name
- Fallopia scandens (L.) Holub

Synonyms
- List: Anredera scandens; Bilderdykia scandens; Fagopyrum scandens; Helxine scandens; Polygonum dumetorum var. scandens; Polygonum scandens; Reynoutria scandens; Tiniaria scandens

= Fallopia scandens =

Plant species in the knotweed family

Fallopia scandens, the climbing false buckwheat, is a species of Fallopia native to North America. It is a herbaceous perennial plant which grows from to 1–5 m (3–16 ft) tall. Although they are semi-erect during bloom, when they are producing fruit, they hang from their pedicels in a downward position. Both the fruit and flower are greenish-white in appearance. In North America, it is often misidentified with Fallopia dumetorum, a species endemic to Europe.

== Taxonomy ==
Fallopia scandens was named Polygonum scandens by Carl Linnaeus in 1753. It was reclassified into the Fallopia genus in 1971 by Josef Ludwig Holub, creating its accepted name. With the rest of its genus it is part of the Polygonaceae family. The species has no varieties, but has a variety name among its eight synonyms from when it was described as a variety of Polygonum dumetorum.

Table of Synonyms
Name	Year	Rank	Notes
Anredera scandens (L.) Moq.	1849	species	≡ hom., nom. illeg. homonym. post.
Bilderdykia scandens (L.) Greene	1904	species	≡ hom.
Fagopyrum scandens (L.) Gross	1913	species	≡ hom.
Helxine scandens (L.) Raf.	1837	species	≡ hom.
Polygonum dumetorum var. scandens (L.) A.Gray	1867	variety	≡ hom.
Polygonum scandens L.	1753	species	≡ hom.
Reynoutria scandens (L.) Shinners	1967	species	≡ hom.
Tiniaria scandens Small	1903	species	= het.
Notes: ≡ homotypic synonym; = heterotypic synonym
