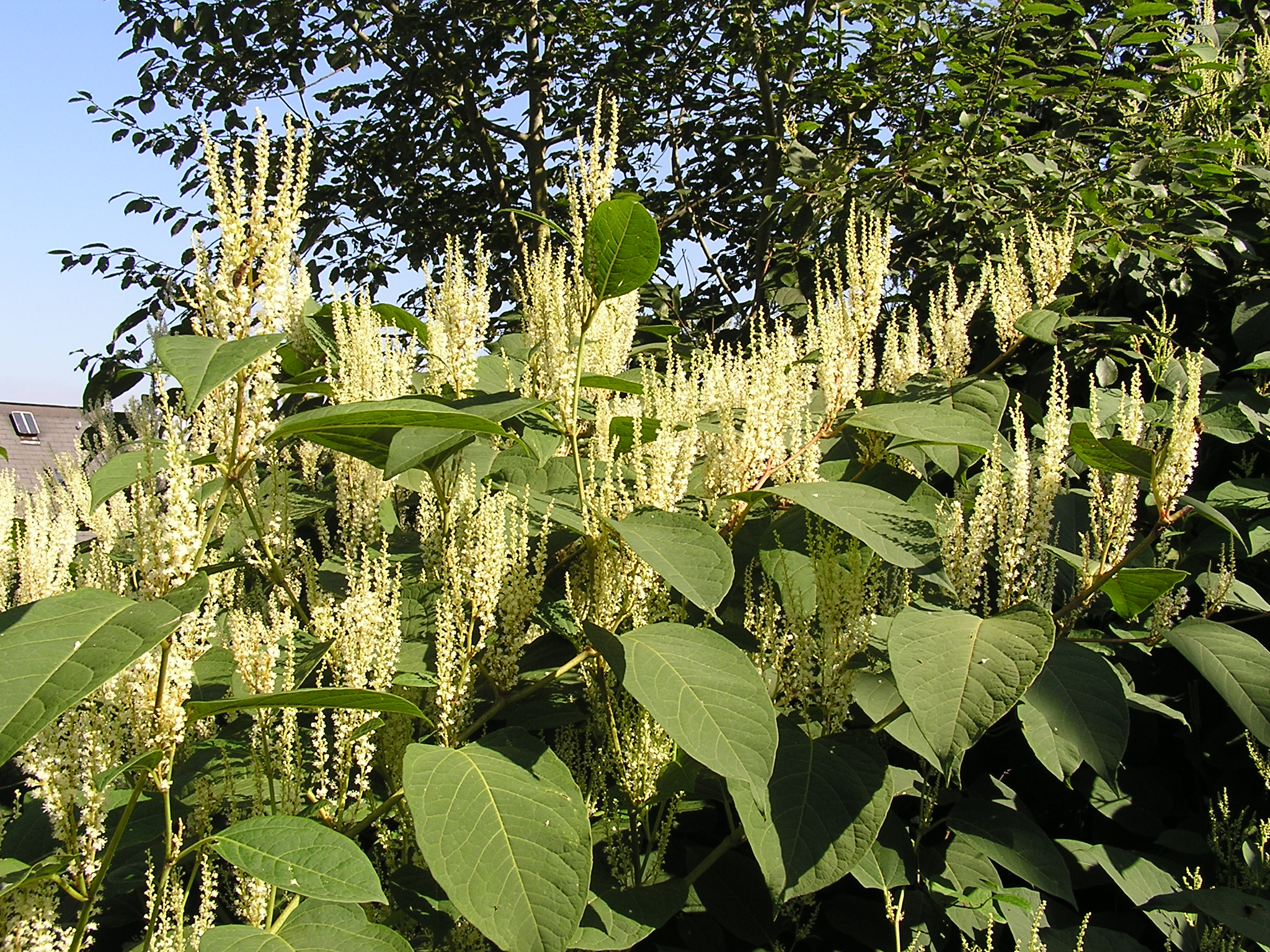
- Japanese knotweed, Reynoutria japonica

Scientific classification
- Kingdom: Plantae
- Clade: Embryophytes
- Clade: Tracheophytes
- Clade: Angiosperms
- Clade: Eudicots
- Order: Caryophyllales
- Family: Polygonaceae
- Subfamily: Polygonoideae
- Genus: Reynoutria; Houtt.

= Reynoutria =

Genus of flowering plants in the knotweed family

Reynoutria is a genus of flowering plants in the Polygonaceae, also known as the knotweed or buckwheat family. The genus is native to eastern China, Eastern Asia and the Russian Far East, although species have been introduced to Europe and North America. Members of the genus, including R. japonica (Japanese knotweed) and its hybrid with R. sachalinensis, are highly invasive plants.

== Description ==
Species placed in the genus Reynoutria are robust erect perennial plants, growing from rhizomes. They are usually monoecious, with mostly bisexual flowers, but also some unisexual flowers. The petals of the flowers are dry and paperlike when mature. The fruits are achenes with threefold sharp edges. The inflorescence is in the form of a panicle. The flowers have separated triangular stigmas with fringes (fimbriate) borne on long divided styles.

== Taxonomy ==
The genus Reynoutria was erected by Maarten Houttuyn in 1777 for the species R. japonica. It was named in honour of Herr von Reynoutre who had been reported to have done a great deal of service to botany. As with many species in the family Polygonaceae, the taxonomic boundaries of Reynoutria have been much confused; in particular, it has been repeatedly merged with and separated from Fallopia. This reorganization began in 1856 or 1857, when Carl Meissner grouped Reynoutria together with Fallopia in Polygonum sect. Tiniaria Meisn. and continued through to the late 20th century, with competing arguments based around plant morphology, habit and chemistry. A series of molecular phylogenetic studies have clarified these relationships; Reynoutria is a well-supported monophyletic taxon.

Reynoutria is placed in the tribe Polygoneae of the subfamily Polygonoideae. Within the tribe, it is most closely related to the genera Muehlenbeckia and Fallopia s.s., forming the so-called "RMF clade". While Muehlenbeckia and Fallopia s.s. are believed to be more closely related, all three share the morphological character of extra floral nectaries.

- Polygoneae
  - Knorringia
  - - - Polygonum ciliinode (syn. Fallopia ciliinodis)
      - DAP clade
        - Duma
        - - Atraphaxis
          - Polygonum
    - RMF clade
      - Reynoutria
      - - Muehlenbeckia
        - Fallopia s.s.

=== Species ===
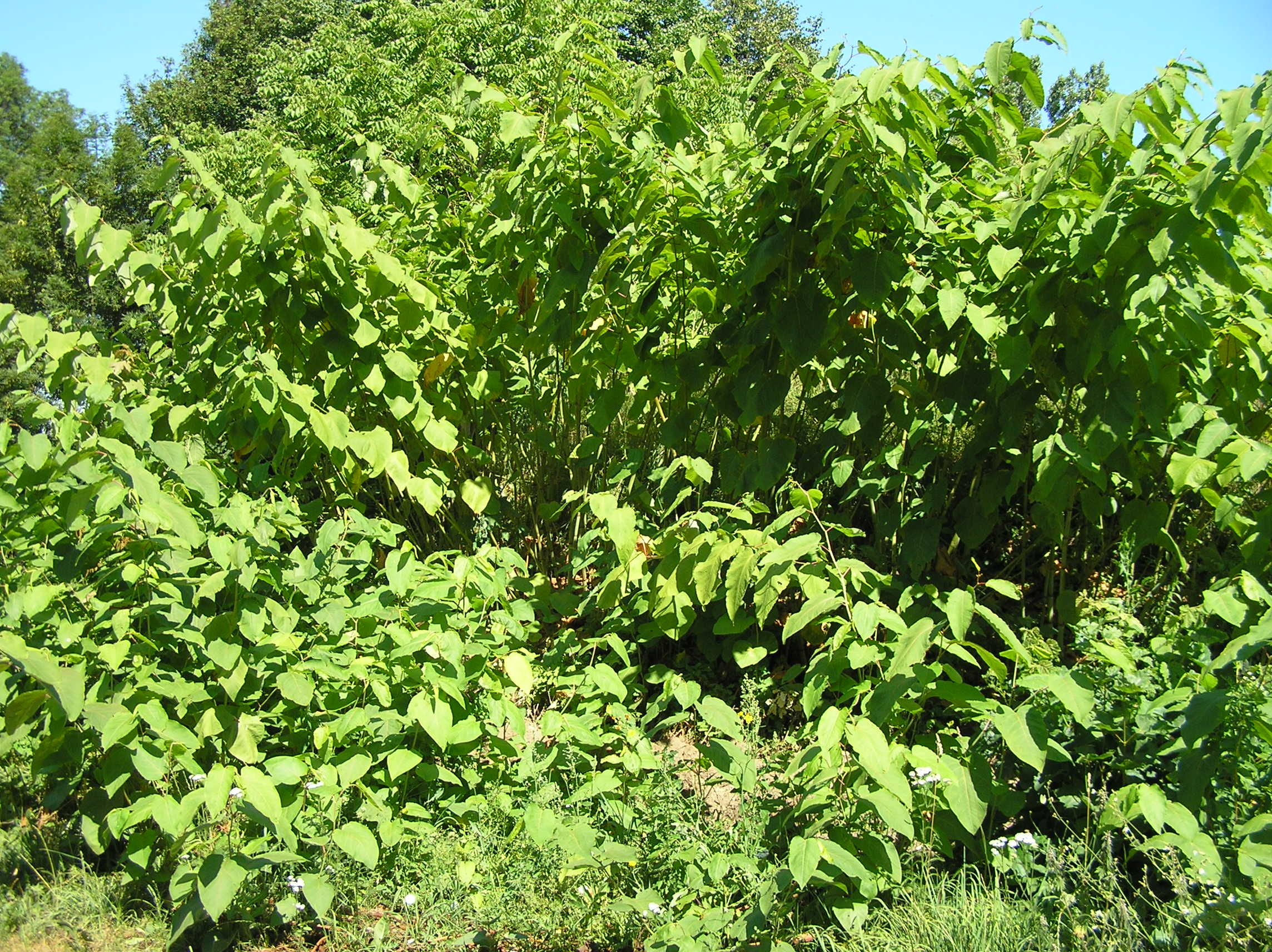
Reynoutria sachalinensis

As of October 2025, Plants of the World Online recognized the following species:

- Reynoutria × bohemica Chrtek & Chrtková (R. japonica × R. sachalinensis) – Bohemian knotweed
- Reynoutria compacta (Hook.f.) Nakai
- Reynoutria forbesii (Hance) T.Yamaz.
- Reynoutria japonica Houtt. – Asian knotweed, Japanese knotweed
- Reynoutria × moravica (Hodálová & Mereďa) Olshanskyi & Antonenko (R. compacta × R. sachalinensis)
- Reynoutria sachalinensis (F.Schmidt) Nakai – giant knotweed, Sakhalin knotweed

==== Formerly placed here ====
- Fallopia ciliinervis (Nakai) Moldenke (as Reynoutria ciliinervis (Nakai) Moldenke)
- Pleuropterus multiflorus (Thunb.) Turcz. ex Nakai (as Reynoutria multiflora (Thunb.) Moldenke) – Chinese knotweed

== Invasive potential ==
All members of the RMF clade appear to have the potential to become invasive, in some cases via vigorous hybrids. Reynoutria japonica is highly invasive throughout Europe and North America. The hybrid between R. japonica and R. sachalinensis, R. × bohemica, is also invasive, particularly in North America. R. japonica hybridizes with the New Zealand Muehlenbeckia australis. (The related M. complexa has established populations in southern parts of Britain and in the Channel Islands.)
