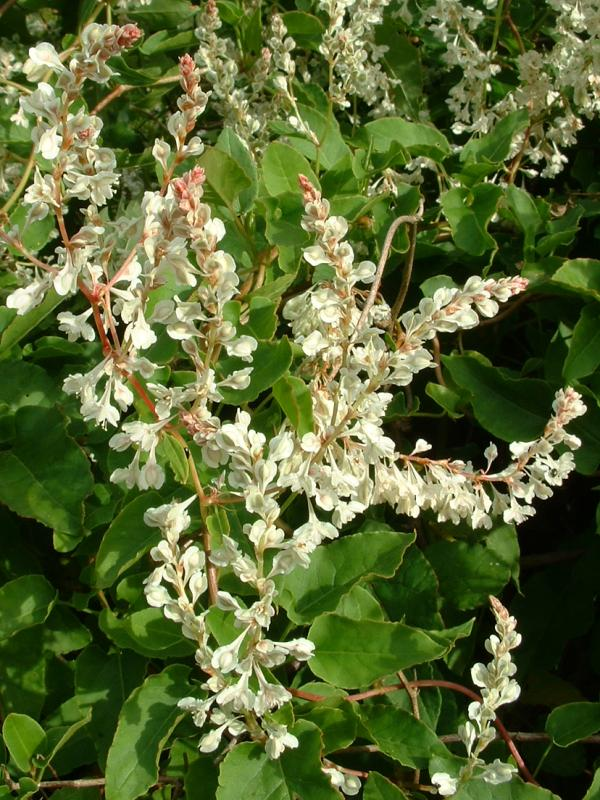

Scientific classification
- Kingdom: Plantae
- Clade: Embryophytes
- Clade: Tracheophytes
- Clade: Spermatophytes
- Clade: Angiosperms
- Clade: Eudicots
- Order: Caryophyllales
- Family: Polygonaceae
- Genus: Fallopia
- Species: F. aubertii

Binomial name
- Fallopia aubertii (L.Henry) Holub

Synonyms
- Synonymy: Polygonum aubertii L.Henry; Bilderdykia aubertii (L.Henry) Moldenke; Reynoutria aubertii (L.Henry) Moldenke; Tiniaria aubertii (L.Henry) Hedberg ex Janch.

= Fallopia aubertii =

Species of flowering plant in the knotweed family

Fallopia aubertii (syn. Polygonum aubertii) is a species of flowering plant in the knotweed family Polygonaceae.
