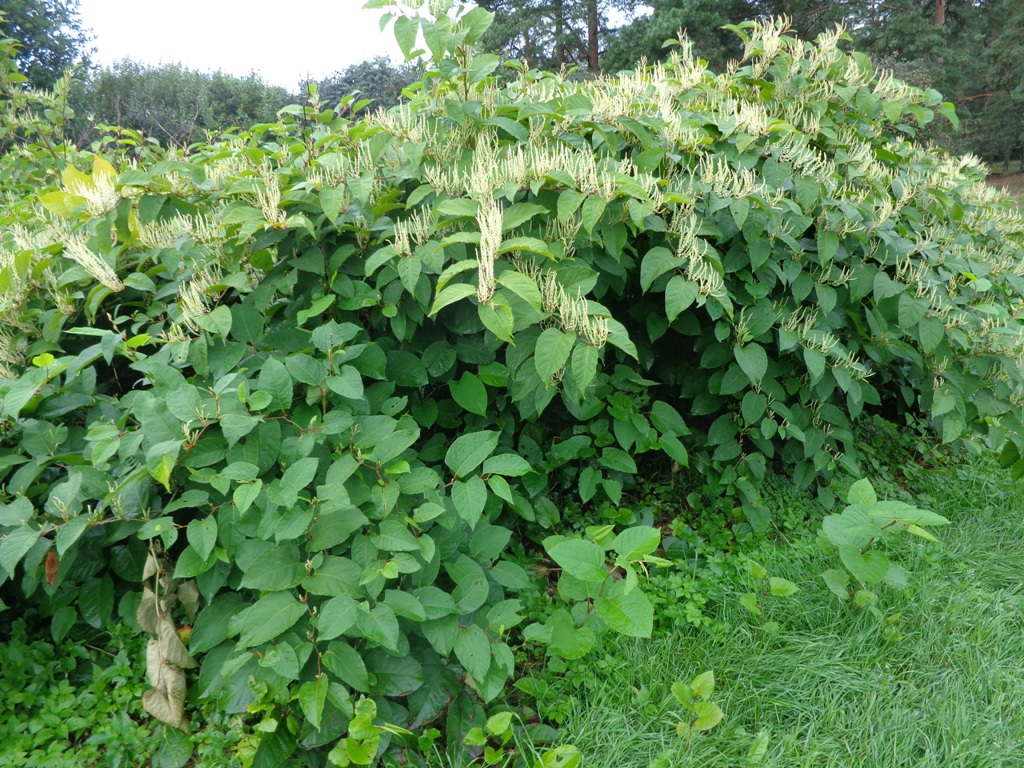

Scientific classification
- Kingdom: Plantae
- Clade: Tracheophytes
- Clade: Angiosperms
- Clade: Eudicots
- Order: Caryophyllales
- Family: Polygonaceae
- Genus: Reynoutria
- Species: R. × bohemica

Binomial name
- Reynoutria × bohemica Chrtek & Chrtková

= Bohemian knotweed =

Species of flowering plant

Bohemian knotweed is a nothospecies that is a cross between Japanese knotweed and giant knotweed. It has been documented as occurring in the wild in Japan. The scientific name is accepted to be Reynoutria × bohemica, but it may also be referred to as Fallopia × bohemica and Polygonum × bohemicum.

The species was first described by Jindřich Chrtek and Anna Chrtková in the Czech Republic in 1983.

== Description ==
The species is an herbaceous perennial that can spread through seeds and rhizomes. It can exceed 3.5 meters in height. Leaves are larger than those of Japanese knotweed, and leaf bases are less squared. White flowers typically open in August. The species can be verified by the hairs along the mid-vein on the undersides of leaves, which are of different shape and texture than those found on either parent species.

== Distribution ==
Bohemian knotweed is typically found in riparian areas and waste places. From the late 1800s, knotweeds have been introduced to new areas as an ornamental garden plant.

The species has a worldwide distribution. It is considered by some as being a native hybrid of Japan. In Europe, it has been reported from the British Isles, Germany, France, northern Italy, Serbia, Bulgaria, Belgium, the Czech Republic, Slovakia, Romania, Ukraine, Scandinavia, and Switzerland. It is widespread in North America, and it has been discovered in Chile. It has also been found in Australia.

== Management ==
In some areas, Bohemian knotweed is classified as an invasive species and a noxious weed. It is illegal to transport and sell in multiple US states, including Minnesota, Washington, and Wisconsin.

Mechanical control and hand pulling are ineffective. Repeat herbicide application through spraying leaves and injecting stems is the best method. The beetle Gallerucida nigromaculata has been considered to have potential as a biological control.
