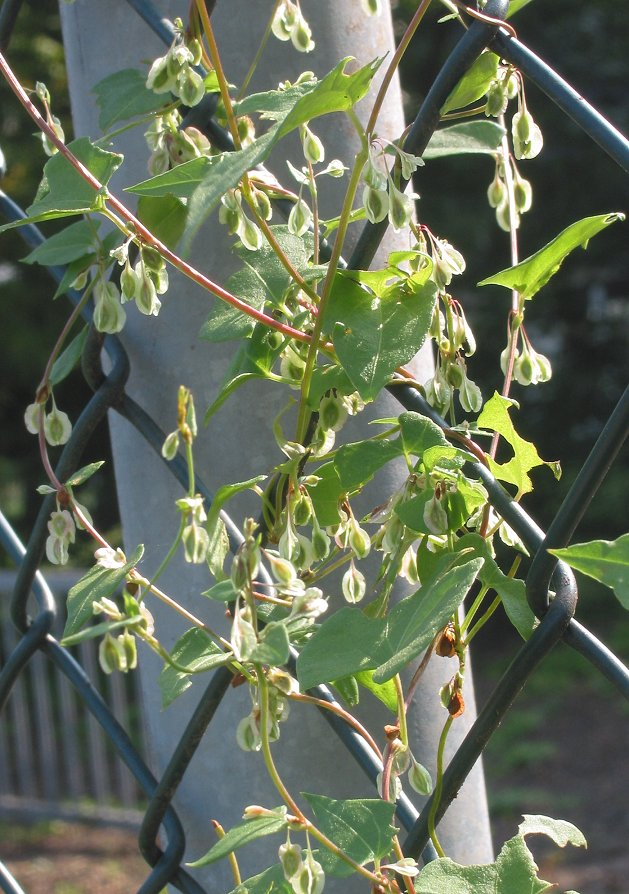

Scientific classification
- Kingdom: Plantae
- Clade: Tracheophytes
- Clade: Angiosperms
- Clade: Eudicots
- Order: Caryophyllales
- Family: Polygonaceae
- Genus: Fallopia
- Species: F. dumetorum

Binomial name
- Fallopia dumetorum (L.) Holub

Synonyms
- Bilderdykia dumetorum (L.) Dumort.; Bilderdykia pauciflora (Maxim.) Nakai; Fagopyrum dumetorum (L.) Schreb.; Fagopyrum membranaceum Moench; Fagopyrum pauciflorum (Maxim.) Gross; Fallopia pauciflora (Maxim.) Kitag.; Helxine dumetorum (L.) Raf.; Polygonum dumetorum L.; Polygonum pauciflorum Maxim.; Tiniaria dumetorum (L.) Opiz; Tiniaria pauciflora (Maxim.) Nakai

= Fallopia dumetorum =

Species of flowering plant

Fallopia dumetorum, also known as copse bindweed, is a species of flowering plant in the family Polygonaceae, native to temperate Eurasia.
