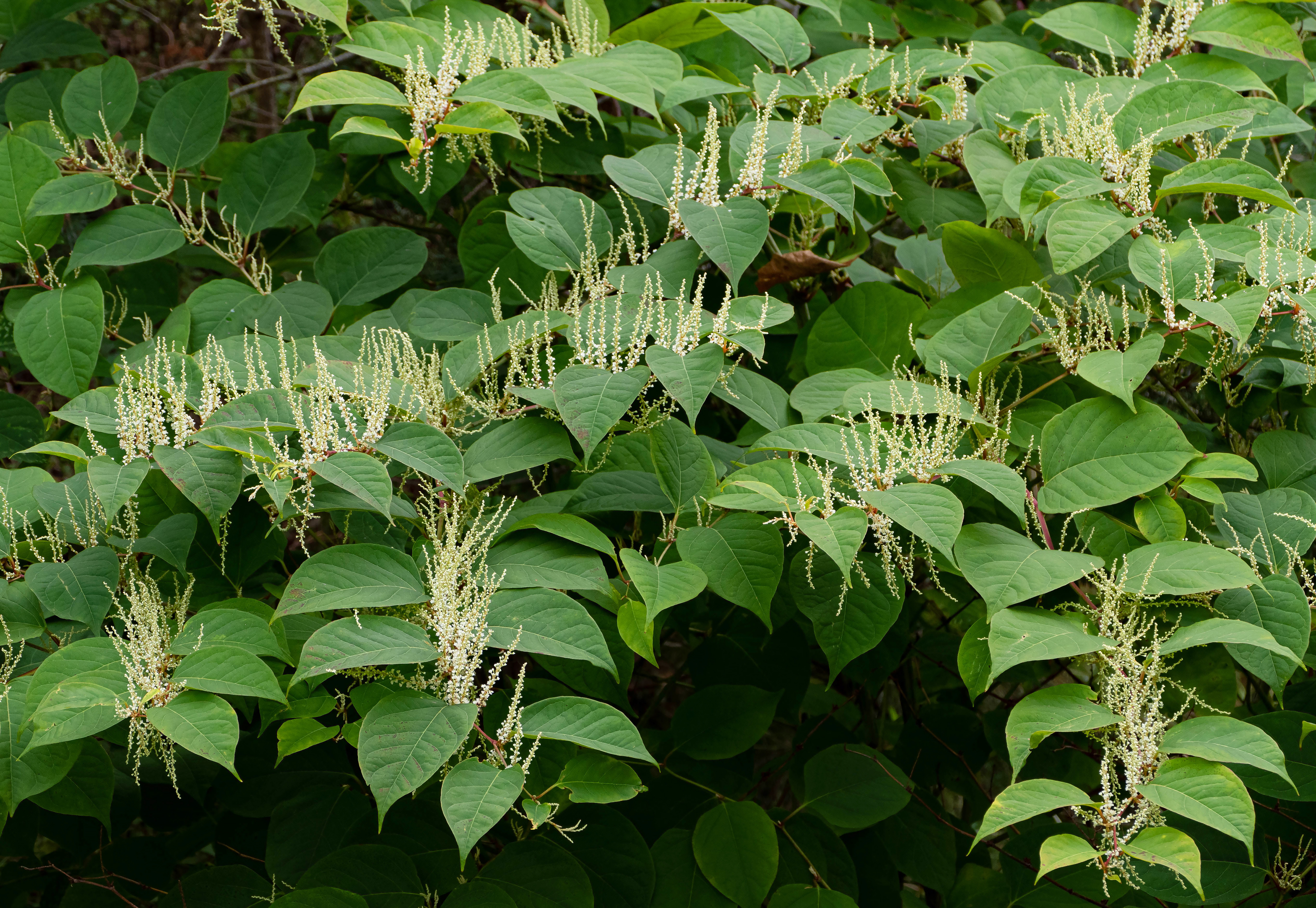

Scientific classification
- Kingdom: Plantae
- Clade: Tracheophytes
- Clade: Angiosperms
- Clade: Eudicots
- Order: Caryophyllales
- Family: Polygonaceae
- Genus: Reynoutria
- Species: R. japonica

Binomial name
- Reynoutria japonica Houtt.

Synonyms
- Fallopia compacta (Hook.f.) G.H.Loos & P.Keil; Fallopia japonica (Houtt.) Ronse Decr.; Pleuropterus cuspidatus (Siebold & Zucc.) H.Gross; Pleuropterus zuccarinii (Small) Small; Polygonum compactum Hook.f.; Polygonum cuspidatum Siebold & Zucc.; Polygonum hachidyoense Makino; Polygonum reynoutria Makino; Polygonum zuccarinii Small; Reynoutria hachidyoensis (Makino) Nakai; Reynoutria hachijoensis Nakai ex Jôtani; Reynoutria hastata Nakai ex Ui; Reynoutria henryi Nakai; Reynoutria uzenensis (Honda) Honda; Reynoutria yabeana Honda; Tiniaria japonica (Houtt.) Hedberg

= Reynoutria japonica =

Flowering plant (Japanese knotweed)

Reynoutria japonica, synonyms Fallopia japonica and Polygonum cuspidatum, is a species of herbaceous perennial plant in the knotweed and buckwheat family Polygonaceae. Common names include Japanese knotweed and Asian knotweed. It is native to East Asia in Japan, China and Korea. In North America and Europe, the species has successfully established itself in numerous habitats; it is classified as a pest and invasive species in several countries. The plant is popular with beekeepers and its young stems are edible, making it an increasingly popular foraged vegetable with a flavour described as lemony rhubarb.

== Description ==
The flowers are small, coloured cream or white, produced in erect racemes 6–15 cm (2 1/2–6 in) long in late summer and early autumn. Japanese knotweed has hollow stems with distinct raised nodes that give it the appearance of the bamboo plant, though it is not related. While stems may reach a maximum height of 3–4 m (10–13 ft) each growing season, it is typical to see much smaller plants in places where they sprout through cracks in the pavement or are repeatedly cut down. The leaves are broad oval with a truncated base, 7–14 cm (3–5 1/2 in) long and 5–12 cm (2–4 1/2 in) broad, with an entire margin. New leaves of Reynoutria japonica are dark red and 1 to 4 cm (1/2 to 1 1/2 in) long; young leaves are green and rolled back with dark red veins; leaves are green and shaped like a heart flattened at the base, or a shield, and are usually around 12 cm (5 in) long. Also they may have two symmetrical nonparallel yellowish stripes around 1-2 cm in diameter.

Mature R. japonica forms 2-to-3-metre-tall (6 1/2 to 10 ft), dense thickets. Leaves shoot from the stem nodes alternately in a zigzag pattern. Plants that are immature or affected by mowing and other restrictions have much thinner and shorter stems than mature stands, and are not hollow. The below-ground rhizome network acts as a long-lived storage system; it is often concentrated in the upper metre of the soil profile, but may extend well beyond the visible stand.

=== Similar species ===
Japanese knotweed may be confused with other plants thought of being knotweed owing to the similar appearance of leaves and stems. Dogwood, lilac, houttuynia (Houttuynia cordata), ornamental bistorts such as red bistort (Persicaria amplexicaulis), lesser knotweed (Koenigia campanulata), Himalayan balsam (Impatiens glandulifera), broad-leaved dock (Rumex obtusifolius), bindweed (Convolvulus arvensis), bamboo, Himalayan honeysuckle (Leycesteria formosa), and Russian vine (Fallopia baldschuanica) have been suspected of being Reynoutria japonica.

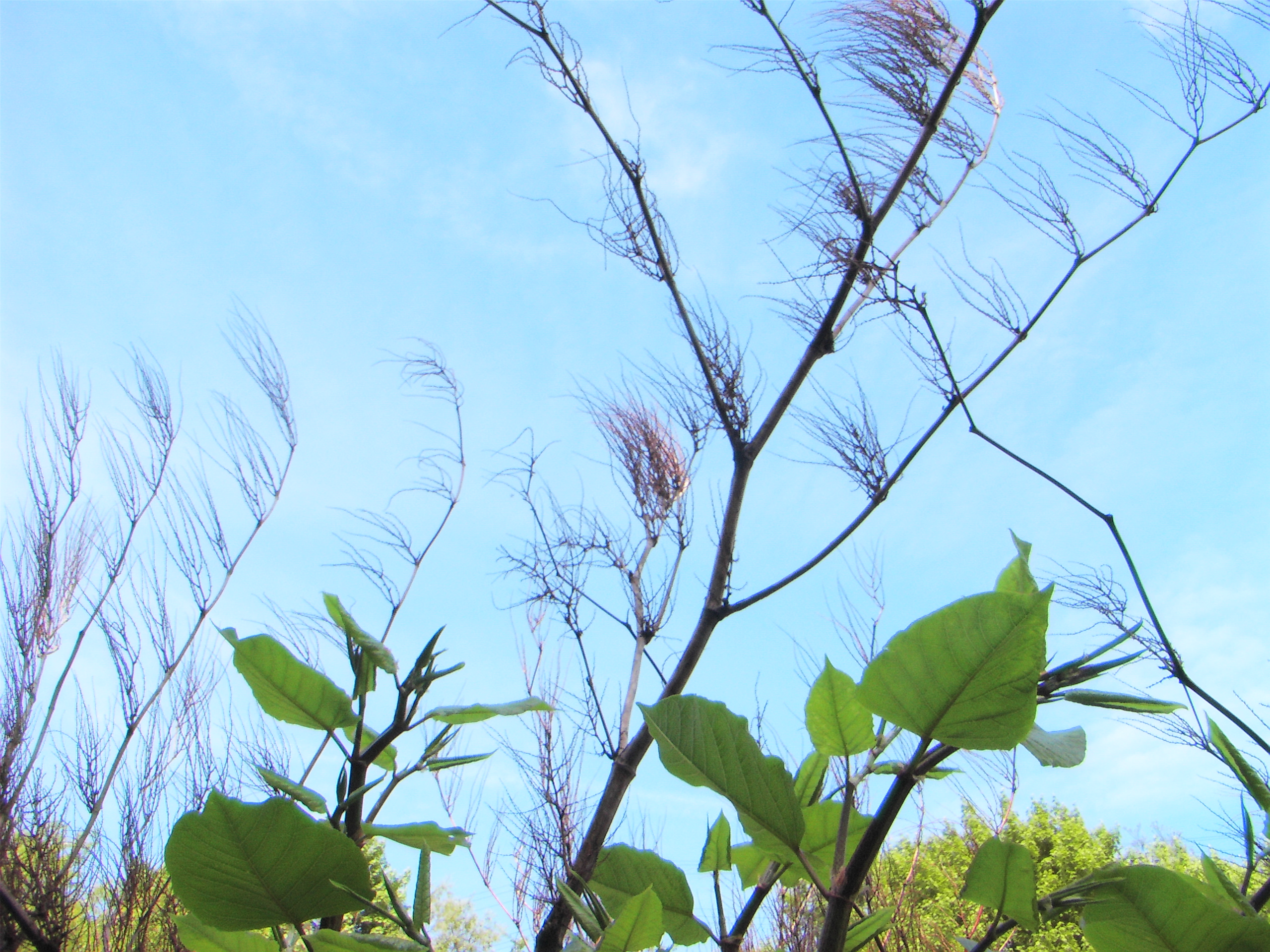
Dead stems from previous years remain in place as new growth appears.

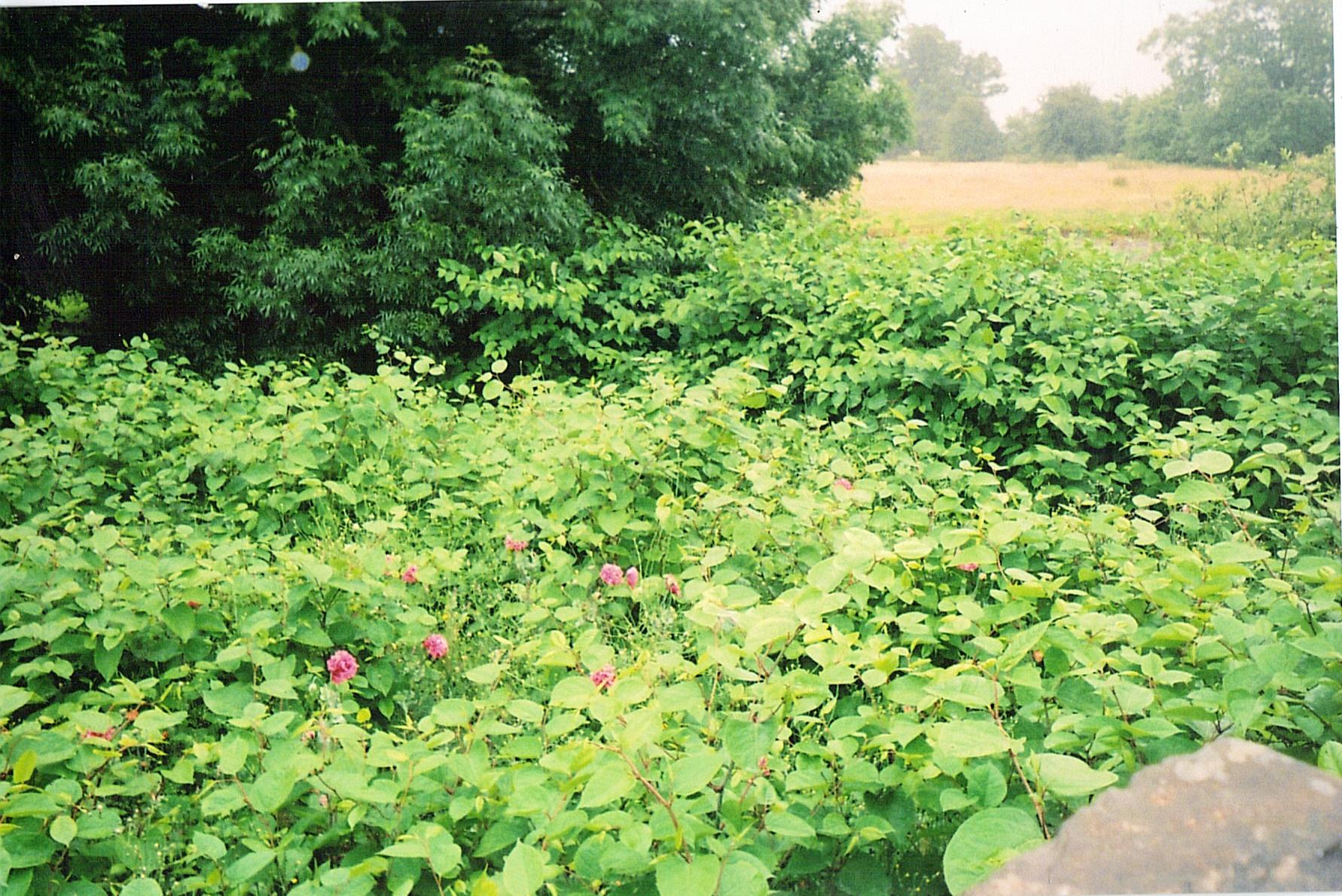
A hedgerow made up of roses and Japanese knotweed

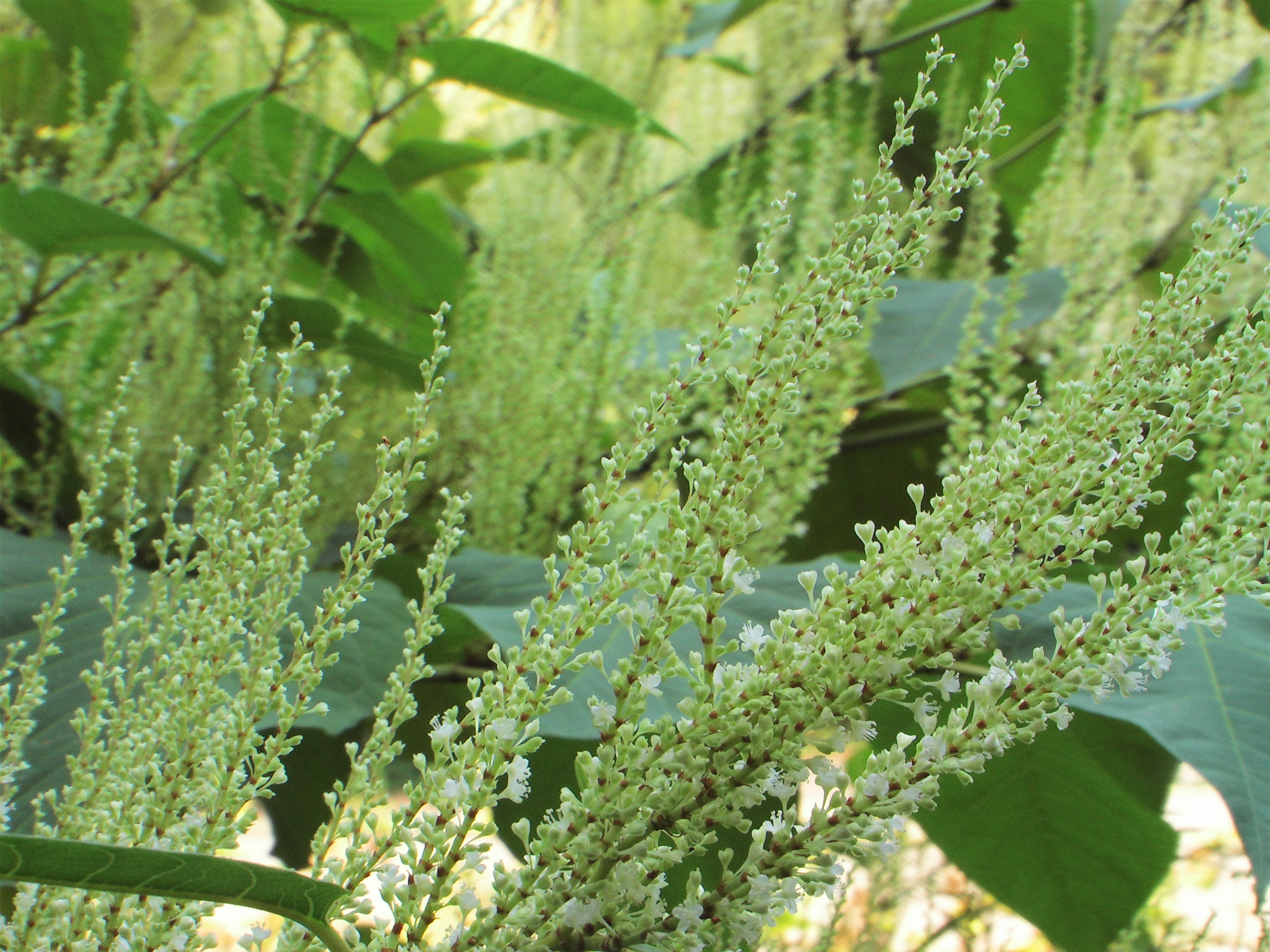
Erect inflorescence

== Distribution and habitat ==
It is native to East Asia in Japan, China and Korea. In this range, R. japonica propagates both sexually and vegetatively. In North America and Europe, the species has successfully established itself in numerous habitats, and is classified as a pest and invasive species in several countries. Spread in invaded ranges is mainly vegetative, through rhizome pieces, stem fragments and soil contaminated with plant material; waterways, construction activity and garden waste can move these propagules over longer distances. Many introduced populations are dominated by male-sterile clonal plants, but some set seed or hybridise with giant knotweed, producing Bohemian knotweed, which bears viable seed.

In its native range and in North America, the Japanese knotweed has two kinds of individuals: one kind produces hermaphroditic flowers with functional male and female organs, and the other produces female flowers without pollen. The genetic diversity in a 1873 herbarium specimen from North America suggests that at least a female individual and a hermaphroditic individual had already been introduced there by that date.

Genetic studies have shown that In England, France, Germany and the Czech Republic, the species is composed of a single female clone. In Poland, R. japonica produces pollen and shows genetic diversity and polymorphism, which is probably the result of isolated cases of effective sexual reproduction.

== As an invasive species ==
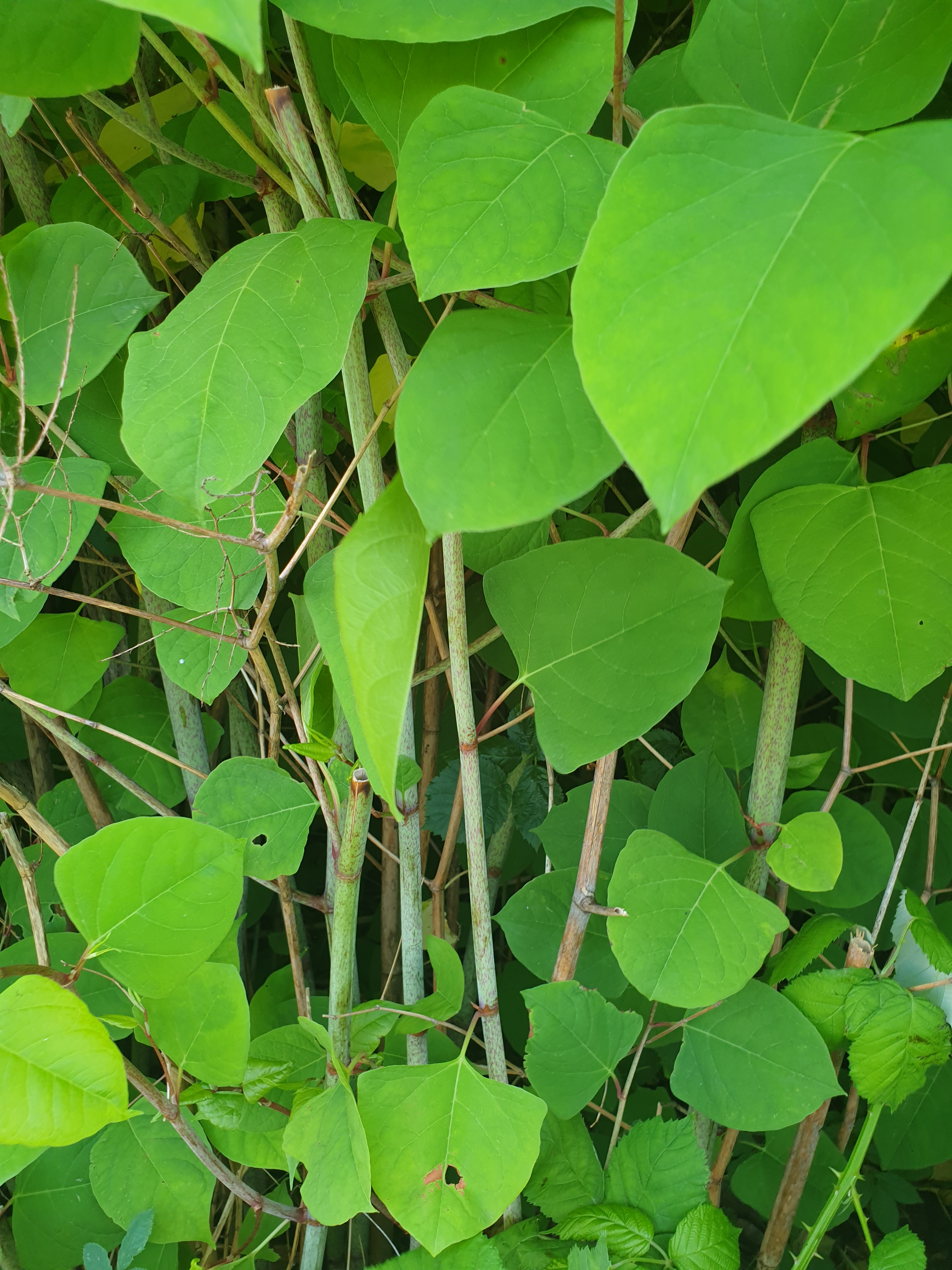
Japanese knotweed (Fallopia japonica) found on the Danish island of Zealand. The densely arranged hollow trunks are visually reminiscent of bamboo.

This species is listed by the World Conservation Union as one of the world's worst invasive species.

It is a frequent colonizer of temperate riparian ecosystems, roadsides, and waste places. It forms thick, dense colonies that can crowd out other herbaceous species and is now considered one of the worst invasive exotics in parts of the eastern United States. The species' competitive effect is produced by rapid shoot growth, dense canopy cover, and persistent leaf and stem litter that can suppress the germination and growth of other plants beneath stands. Dense monospecific stands can reduce native plant assemblages and modify ecosystem functioning, including nutrient cycling. The success of the species has been partially attributed to its tolerance of a very wide range of conditions, including drought, different soil types, variable soil pH, and high salinity. Its rhizomes can survive temperatures of −35 °C (−31 °F) and can extend 7 metres (23 ft) horizontally and 3 metres (10 ft) deep, making removal by excavation extremely difficult. The plant is also resilient in response to cutting, vigorously resprouting from the roots.

=== Impact ===
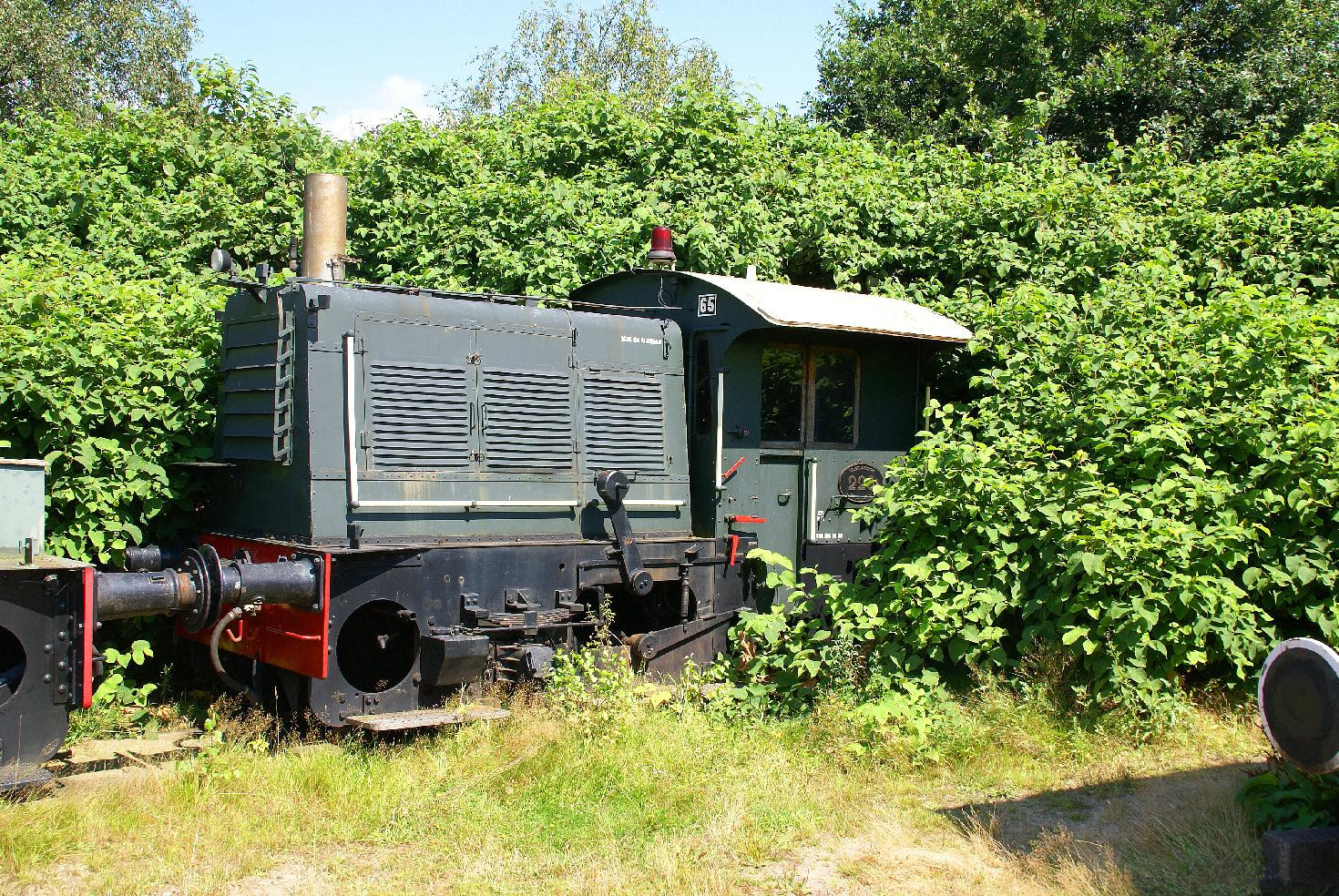
This antique locomotive NS Class 200 at Beekbergen, Netherlands, is overgrown by knotweed. A few years before, it was free of knotweed.

Japanese knotweed has a strong and extensive root system that can exploit cracks and weaknesses in hard surfaces such as concrete, asphalt, and brick. As the plant grows, it can damage vulnerable paving, walls, drains, retaining structures and architectural sites, and dense growth can impede access and maintenance. Recent scientific literature describes the threat of property damage as partly a perceived risk, while noting that this perception has nevertheless affected mortgage lending and housing valuation.

Japanese knotweed shades out other vegetation, grows over buildings and other structures, encourages fire, and damages paved surfaces.

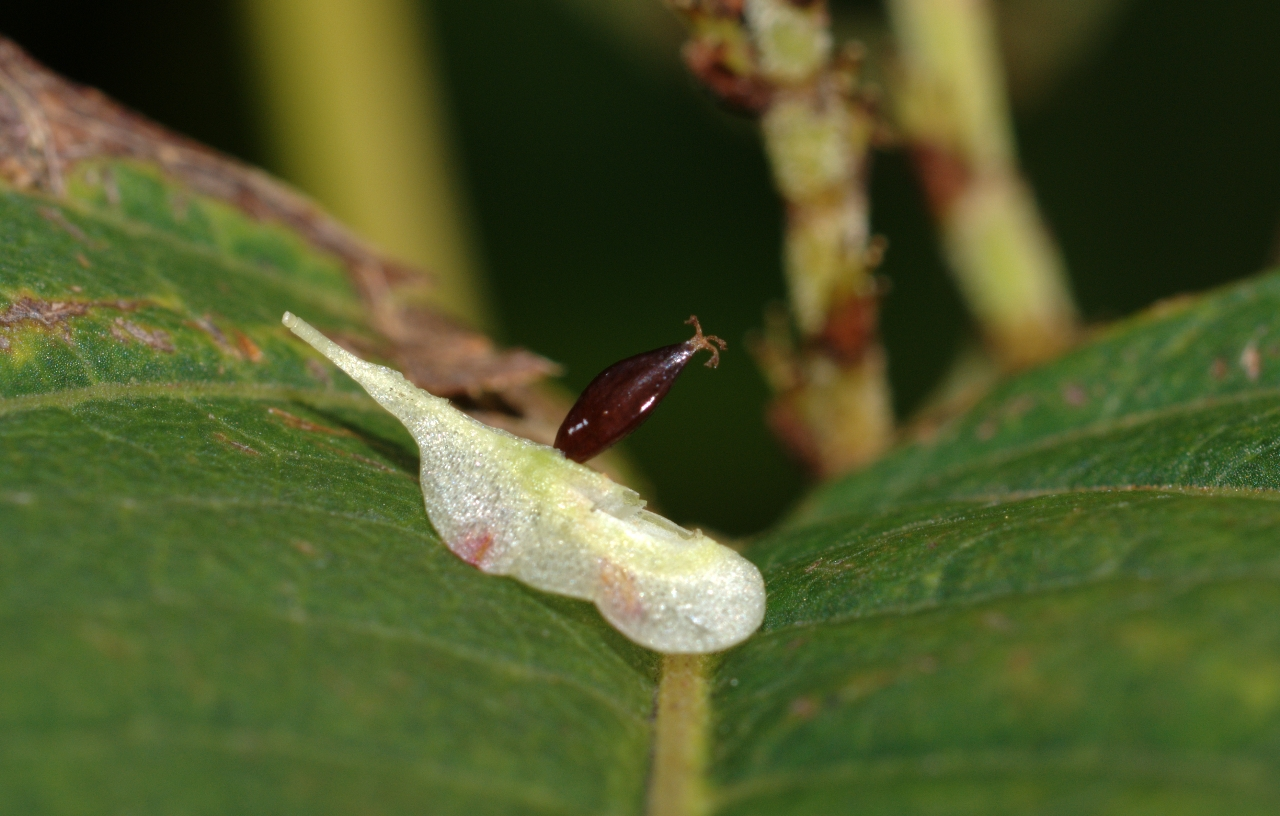
Seed removed from its achene

==== New Zealand ====
Japanese knotweed is classed as an unwanted organism in New Zealand and is established in some parts of the country.

==== Europe ====
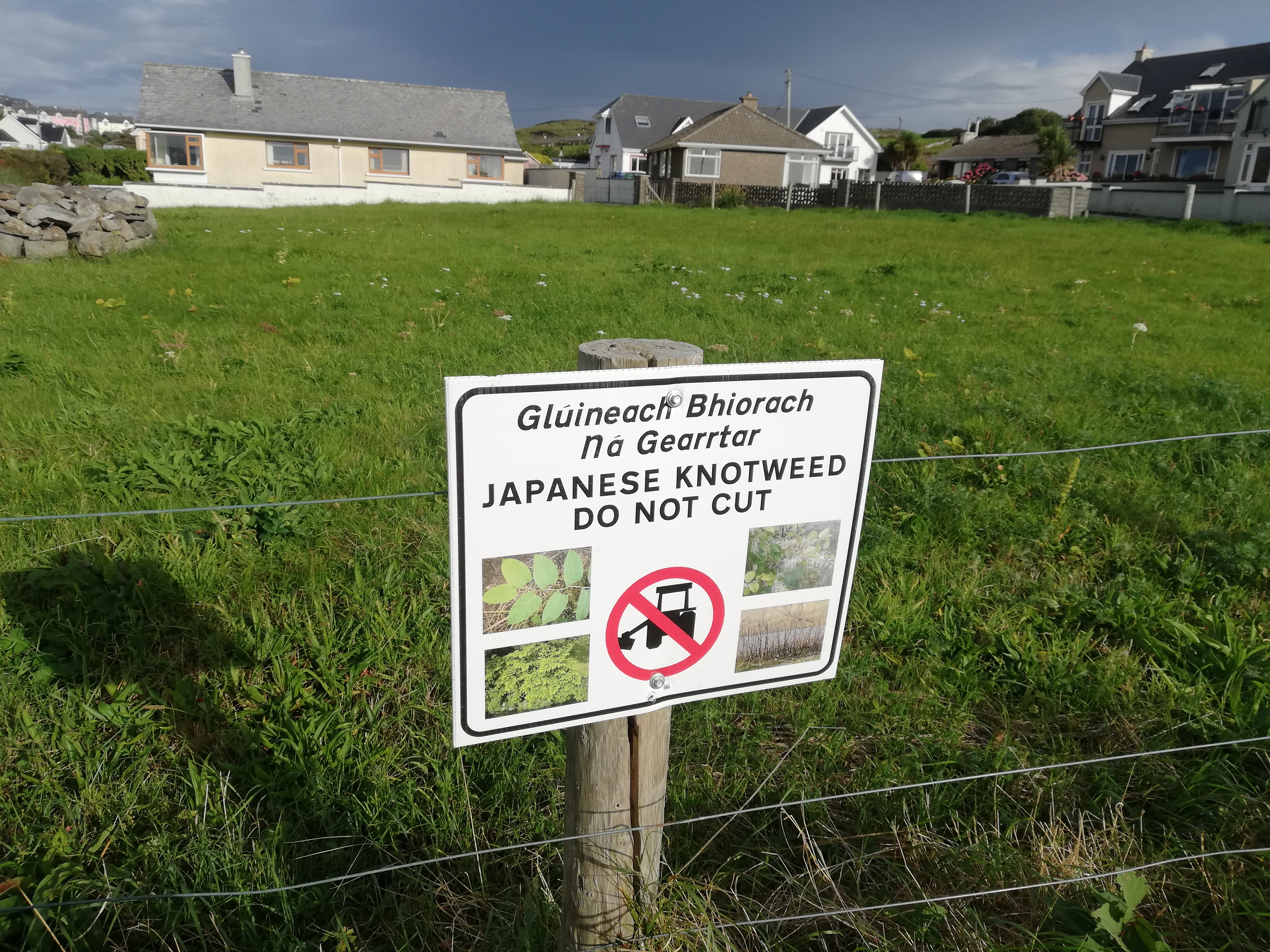
Japanese knotweed warning in Lahinch, Ireland

European adventurer Philipp Franz von Siebold transported Japanese knotweed from a Japanese volcano to Leiden, Netherlands. By 1850, a specimen from this plant was donated by Von Siebold to the Royal Botanic Gardens, Kew. It was favoured by gardeners because it looked like bamboo and grew everywhere. Ann Conolly provided the first authoritative work on the history and distribution of the plant in the UK and Europe in the 1970s. According to The Daily Telegraph, the plant has travelled rapidly, aided by rail and water networks. In the UK, Japanese knotweed is a single female clone. However, it is able to readily hybridise with related species. The hybrid with giant knotweed, Fallopia × bohemica or Reynoutria × bohemica, can produce viable seed and has been considered potentially more invasive and harder to control, although evidence for different responses to control methods remains inconclusive.

In the UK, Japanese knotweed is established in the wild in many parts of the country and creates problems due to the impact on biodiversity, flood management and damage to property. It is an offence under section 14(2) of the Wildlife and Countryside Act 1981 to "plant or otherwise cause to grow in the wild" any plant listed in Schedule nine, Part II to the Act, which includes Japanese knotweed. As of 2014, householders and landlords in residential areas who do not control the plant in their gardens, can receive an on-the-spot fine or be prosecuted. It is also classed as "controlled waste" in Britain under part 2 of the Environmental Protection Act 1990. This requires disposal at licensed landfill sites.

In the United Kingdom, evidence or suspected evidence of knotweed can affect saleability and lending decisions because surveyors, lenders and owners treat infestation as a property-risk and management issue. The species is expensive to remove. It cost £70 million to eradicate knotweed from 10 acres of the London 2012 Olympic Games velodrome and aquatic centre. Defra's Review of Non-native Species Policy states that a national eradication programme would be prohibitively expensive at £1.56 billion. The Centre for Ecology and Hydrology has been using citizen science to develop a system that gives a knotweed risk rating throughout Britain.

The decision was taken on 9 March 2010 in the UK to release into the wild a Japanese psyllid insect, Aphalara itadori. Its diet is highly specific to Japanese knotweed and shows good potential for its control. Controlled release trials began in South Wales in 2016.

In Scotland, the Wildlife and Natural Environment (Scotland) Act 2011 came into force in July 2012, superseding the Wildlife and Countryside Act 1981. This act states that is an offence to spread, intentionally or unintentionally, Japanese knotweed (or other invasive species).

In Northern Ireland, it has been recorded in Counties Down, Antrim and Londonderry. The earliest record is in 1872.

In the Republic of Ireland, it has been recorded from Howth Head, County Dublin at Doldrum Bay.

==== United Kingdom lending controversy ====
In the United Kingdom, Japanese knotweed has received significant attention in the press as a result of very restrictive lending policies by banks and other mortgage companies. Several lenders have refused mortgage applications on the basis of the plant being discovered in the garden or neighbouring gardens. The Royal Institution of Chartered Surveyors published a report in 2012 in response to lenders refusing to lend "despite [knotweed] being treatable and rarely causing severe damage to the property".

There is a real lack of information and understanding of what Japanese knotweed is and the actual damage it can cause. Without actual advice and guidance, surveyors have been unsure of how to assess the risk of Japanese knotweed, which can result in inconsistent reporting of the plant in mortgage valuations. RICS hopes that this advice will provide the industry with the tools it needs to measure the risk effectively, and provide banks with the information they require to identify who and how much to lend to at a time when it is essential to keep the housing market moving.

— Philip Santo, RICS Residential Professional Group

In response to this guidance, several lenders have relaxed their criteria in relation to discovery of the plant. As recently as 2012, the policy at the lender Woolwich (part of Barclays plc) was "if Japanese knotweed is found on or near the property then a case will be declined due to the invasive nature of the plant." Their criteria have since been relaxed to a category-based system depending on whether the plant is discovered on a neighbouring property (categories 1 and 2) or the property itself (categories 3 and 4) incorporating proximity to the property curtilage and the main buildings. Even in a worst-case scenario (category 4), where the plant is "within 7 metres (23 feet) of the main building, habitable spaces, conservatory and/or garage and any permanent outbuilding, either within the curtilage of the property or on neighbouring land; and/or is causing serious damage to permanent outbuildings, associated structures, drains, paths, boundary walls and fences" Woolwich lending criteria now specify that this property may be acceptable if "remedial treatment by a Property Care Association (PCA) registered firm has been satisfactorily completed. Treatment must be covered by a minimum 10-year insurance-backed guarantee, which is property specific and transferable to subsequent owners and any mortgagee in possession." Santander have relaxed their attitude in a similar fashion. In 2022 the Royal Institution of Chartered Surveyors produced updated guidance for assessing knotweed. Since the 2012 RICS report much more information on the risks from Japanese knotweed have been gained. One important change is that the distance of a plant from a property to be considered a problem has been reduced to 3 metres (10 feet).

Property Care Association chief executive Steve Hodgson, whose trade body has set up a task force to deal with the issue, said: "Japanese knotweed is not 'house cancer' and could be dealt with in the same way qualified contractors dealt with faulty wiring or damp."

==== United States ====
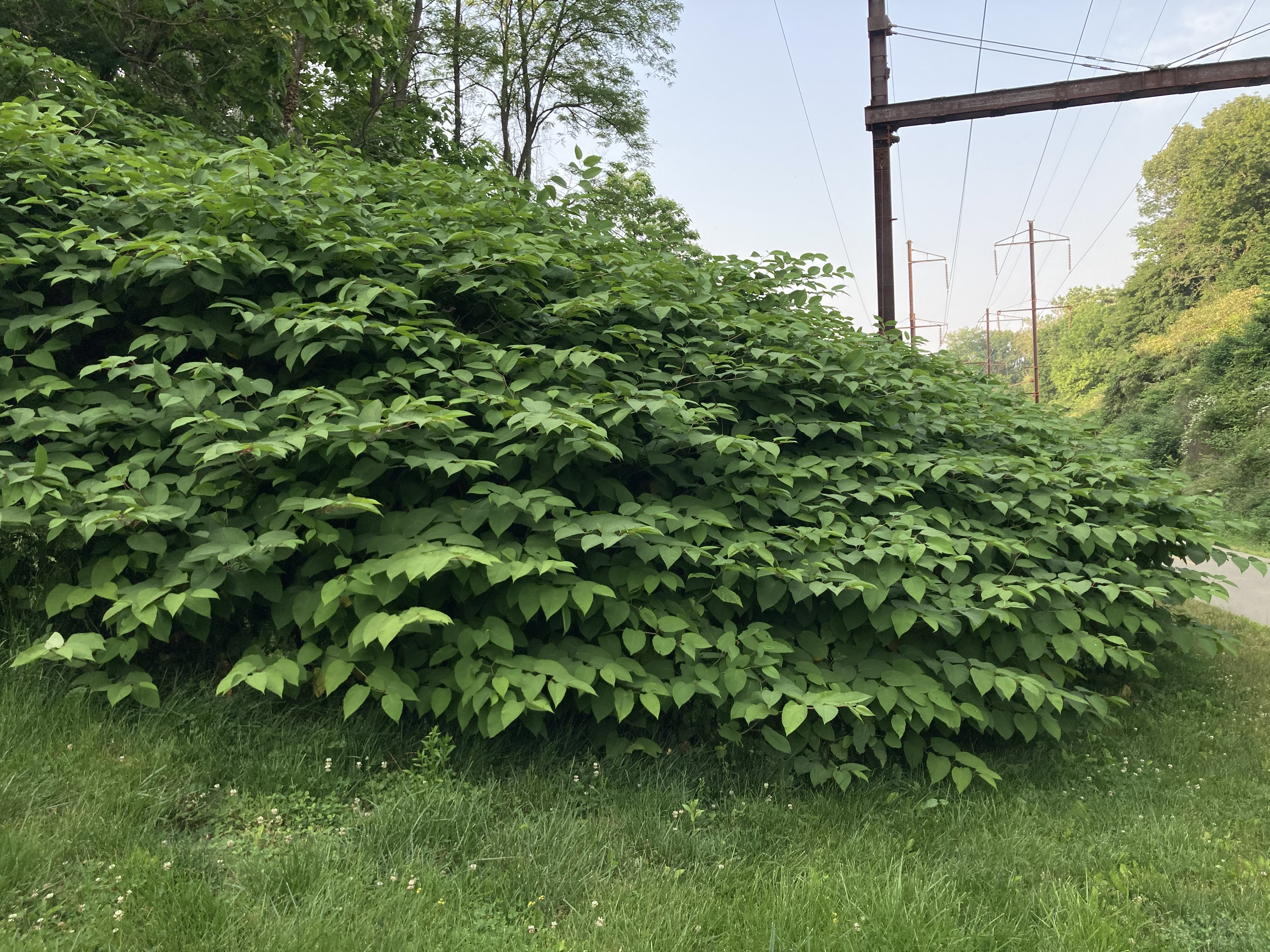
Japanese knotweed along the Cynwyd Heritage Trail

The weed can be found in 41 of the 50 states in the US, excluding Alabama, Arizona, Florida, Hawaii, Nevada, New Mexico, North Dakota, Texas, and Wyoming.

==== Canada ====
According to Gail Wallin, executive director of the Invasive Species Council of B.C., and co-chair of the Canadian Council on Invasive Species, by 2015 it was found in all provinces in Canada except Manitoba and Saskatchewan. In Vancouver plants went under "four lanes of highway and have popped up on the other side." At Mission Point Park in Davis Bay, British Columbia, municipal crews attempted to eradicate it by digging out the plant to a depth of about three metres (10 feet) with an excavator. It grew back twice as large the next year. To avoid an epidemic as in the United Kingdom, some provinces in Canada are pushing for relaxation of provincial limits on the use of herbicides close to waterways so knotweed can be aggressively managed with strong chemicals. In spite of its status as an invasive species it is still sometimes sold or swapped in Canada as an edible "false bamboo". Bohemian knotweed, a hybrid between Japanese and giant knotweed that produces huge quantities of viable seeds, now accounts for about 80 per cent of knotweed infestations in British Columbia.

=== Control ===
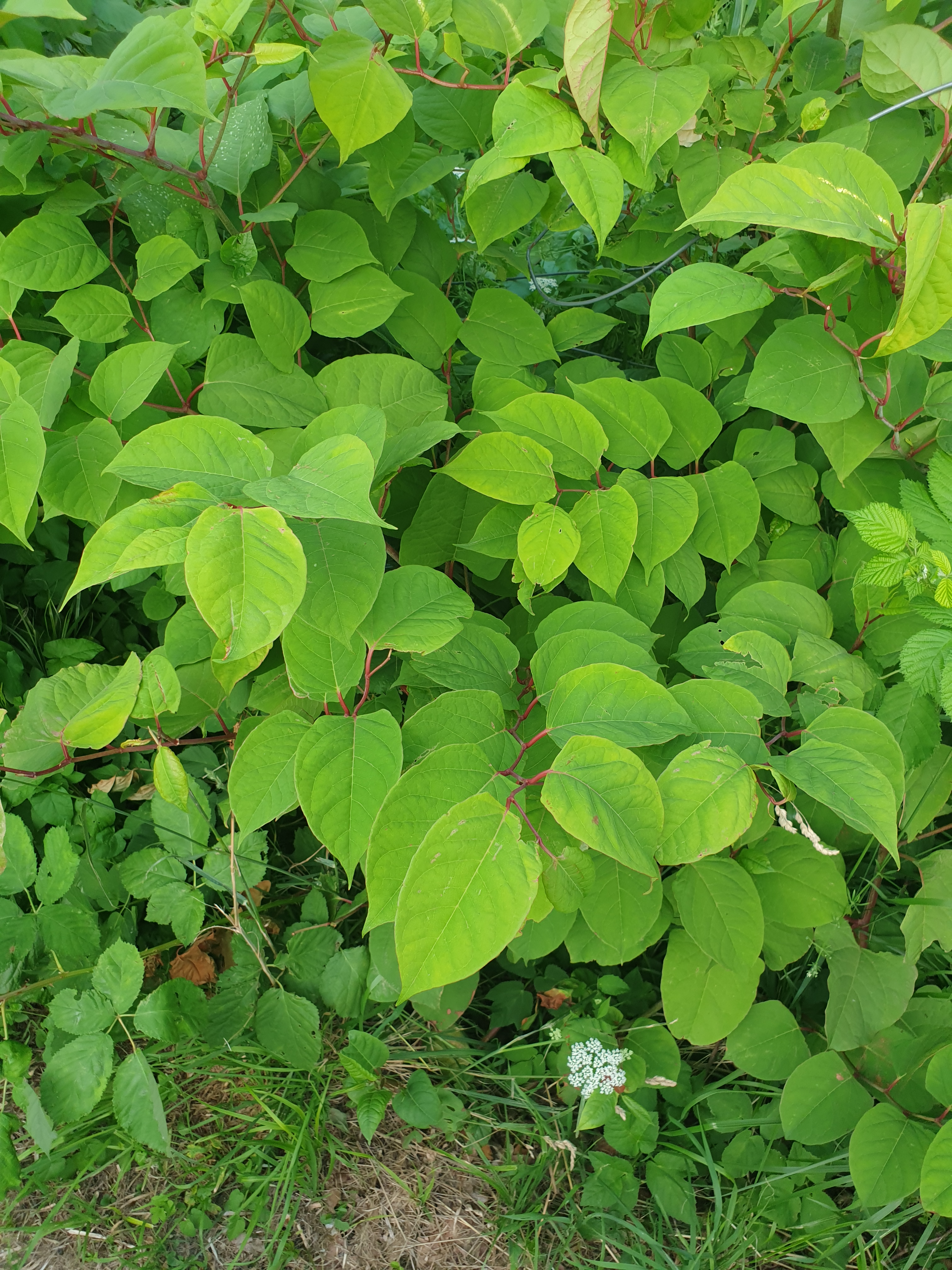
The leaf of Japanese knotweed is smooth along the edges and flattened along the stem. The stem is usually red.

Japanese knotweed has a large underground network of roots (rhizomes). To eradicate the plant the roots need to be killed. Management aims either to exhaust rhizome reserves or to move systemic herbicide into below-ground tissues, so treatment timing and repeated follow-up are central to successful control programmes. Short-term reductions in above-ground stems do not necessarily indicate eradication because rhizomes may remain viable and resprout. All above-ground portions of the plant need to be controlled repeatedly for several years in order to weaken and kill the entire patch. Picking the right herbicide is essential, as it must travel through the plant and into the root system below. But also more ecologically friendly means are being tested as an alternative to chemical treatments.

==== Chemical ====
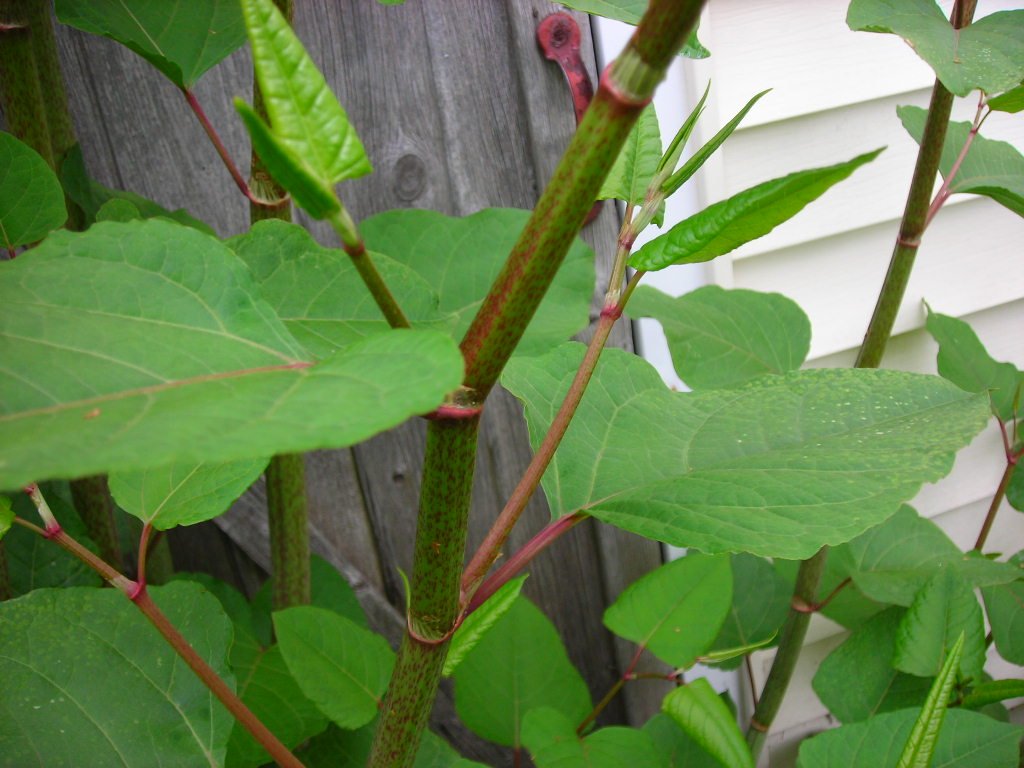
Detail of the stalk

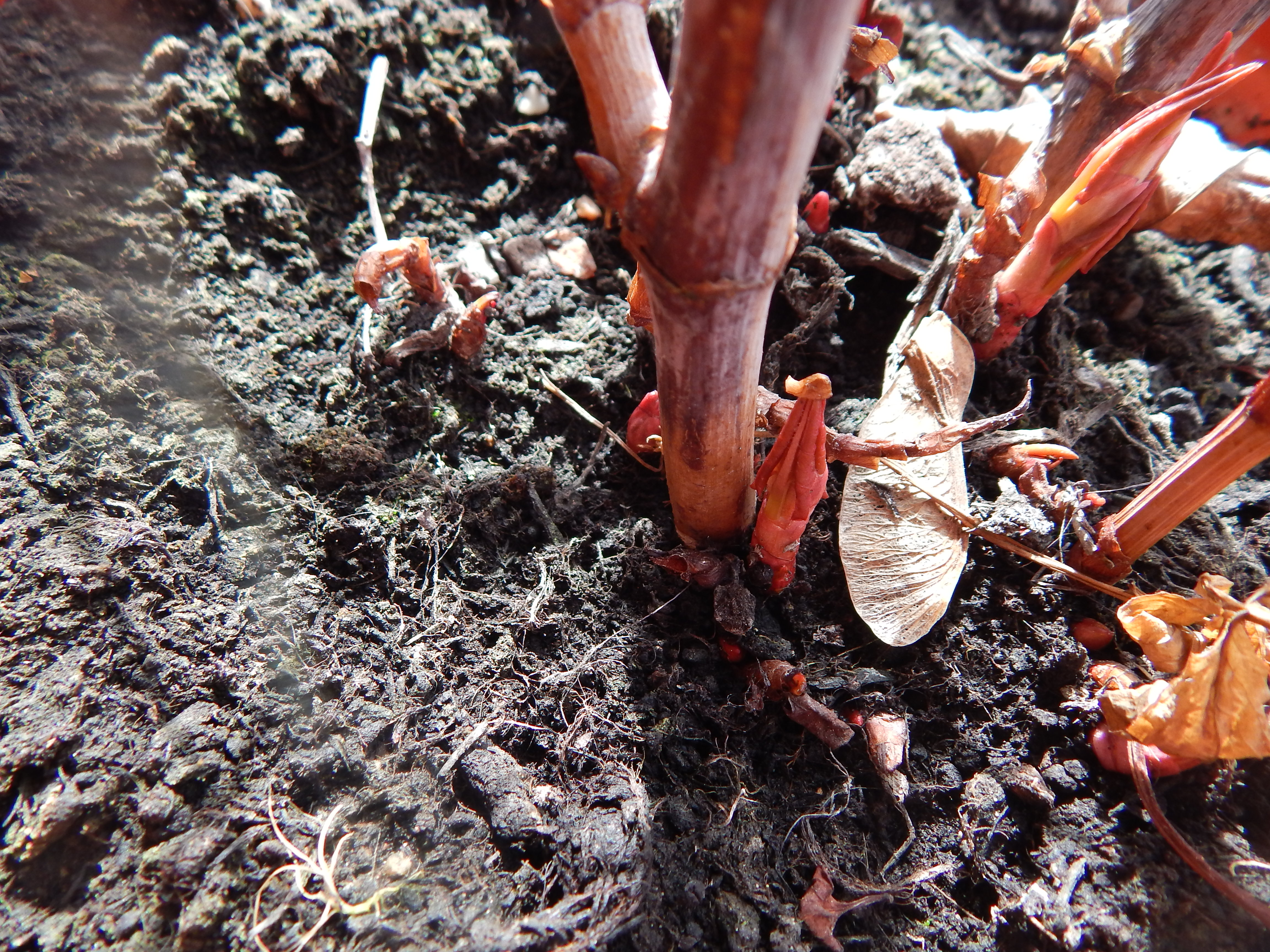
In spring

A systematic review found short-term reductions in Japanese or hybrid knotweed abundance after glyphosate, imazapyr, glyphosate plus imazapyr, cutting followed by stem filling with glyphosate, and cutting followed by spraying regrowth with glyphosate, but it found no robust evidence that these methods eradicate knotweed in the short term. The same review found that cutting alone did not significantly reduce abundance, that most evidence came from studies shorter than three years, and that long-term evidence remained weak. Later application of glyphosate may increase effectiveness, but the timing effect was treated cautiously because it could be confounded with treatment duration and other study differences.

A large three-year field trial found that none of 19 physical, chemical or combined treatments completely eradicated F. japonica, but that multiple-stage glyphosate-based approaches gave the greatest control. In that trial, increasing herbicide dose did not improve control, whereas treatments that maximised glyphosate coverage and matched herbicide movement to seasonal rhizome source–sink dynamics reduced basal cover and stem density most strongly. Stem injection can reduce spray drift and may be useful where foliar spraying is impractical or unacceptable, but experiments have found regrowth after apparently strong short-term injury and therefore a need for follow-up treatment. In a life-cycle assessment based on field-relevant knotweed management data, glyphosate-based methods had the lowest production-phase environmental impacts and economic costs, while geomembrane covering and integrated physical-chemical methods were the costliest and had the greatest modelled impacts.

==== Mechanical ====
Digging up the rhizomes is a common solution where the land is to be developed, as this is quicker than the use of herbicides, but safe disposal of the plant material without spreading it is difficult; knotweed is classed as controlled waste in the UK, and disposal is regulated by law. Digging up the roots is also very labour-intensive and not always effective. The roots can extend up to 3 metres (10 feet) deep, and leaving even just a few centimetres (inches) of root behind will result in the plant quickly growing back.

Mechanical control can reduce height and access problems, but cutting, mowing or moving contaminated soil can also create and disperse viable propagules if material is not contained. In Belgian field tests, repeated cutting combined with native tree planting reduced knotweed development more than other mechanical treatments, but did not eradicate stands. Physical methods such as covering, excavation and encapsulation may be useful on development sites, but they can be labour-intensive and expensive, and they are not automatically lower-impact than herbicide-based approaches when production, transport and implementation are included.

Covering the affected patch of ground with a non-translucent material can be an effective follow-up strategy. However, the trimmed stems of the plant can be razor sharp and are able to pierce through most materials. Covering with non-flexible materials such as concrete slabs has to be done meticulously and without leaving even the smallest splits. The slightest opening can be enough for the plant to grow back.

Soil steam sterilization involves injecting steam into contaminated soil in order to kill subterranean plant parts.

Trials in Haida Gwaii, British Columbia, using sea water sprayed on the foliage, have not demonstrated promising results.

==== Biological ====
Research has been carried out on a Mycosphaerella leaf spot fungus, which devastates knotweed in its native Japan. This research has been relatively slow due to the complex life cycle of the fungus.

Following earlier studies, imported Japanese knotweed psyllid insects Aphalara itadori, whose only food source is Japanese knotweed, were released at a number of sites in Britain in a study running from 1 April 2010 to 31 March 2014. In 2012, results suggested that establishment and population growth were likely, after the insects overwintered successfully. In 2020 Amsterdam imported and released 5,000 Japanese Aphalara itadori leaf fleas, exempting them from a strict ban on the introduction of alien species, as one of the measures to contain the knotweed. The psyllids suck up sap from the plant, potentially killing young shoots and slowing or even stopping growth. It was hoped that the psyllid would hibernate over winter and establish themselves in 2021.

Anecdotal reports of effective control describe the use of goats to eat the plant parts above ground followed by the use of pigs to root out and eat the underground parts of the plant.

== Uses ==
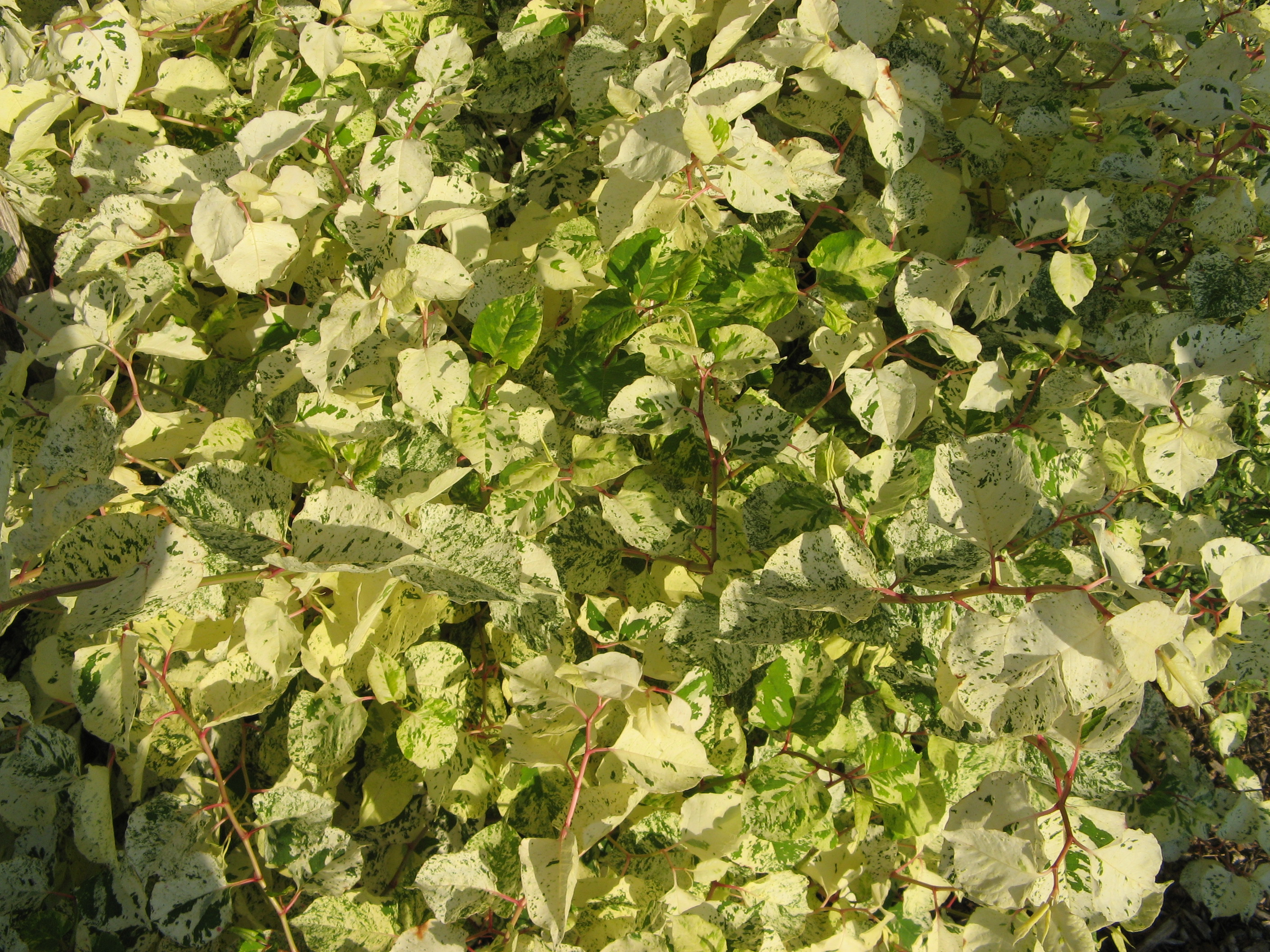
A variegated variety of Japanese knotweed, used as a landscape plant

Japanese knotweed flowers are valued by some beekeepers as an important source of nectar for honeybees, at a time of year when little else is flowering. Japanese knotweed yields a monofloral honey, usually called bamboo honey by northeastern U.S. beekeepers, like a mild-flavored version of buckwheat honey (a related plant also in the Polygonaceae).

The young stems are edible as a spring vegetable, with a flavour similar to rhubarb. In some locations, semi-cultivating Japanese knotweed for food has been used as a means of controlling knotweed populations that invade sensitive wetland areas and drive out the native vegetation. It is eaten in Japan as sansai or wild foraged vegetable. In Europe, young shoots have been used in restaurant cuisine.

Knotweed can grow up to 30 cm (12 in) per day, hence it is a fast-growing vegetable tolerant of poor quality soils. Because knotweed is resistant to over-harvesting, it is more often foraged than cultivated as a vegetable. The plant can be eaten raw or cooked.

Ground-feeding songbirds and gamebirds also eat the seeds.

=== Health ===
Rhizome of R. japonica is the source of lactoperoxidase peroxidation cycle substrates, which can act as activators and inhibitors of the antimicrobial properties of that system.

It is often used as a source for the extraction of the antioxidant resveratrol.

Polygonum cuspidatum is a medicinal plant used in traditional Chinese medicine, with alleged effects on the liver, gallbladder and lungs.

=== In Japan ===
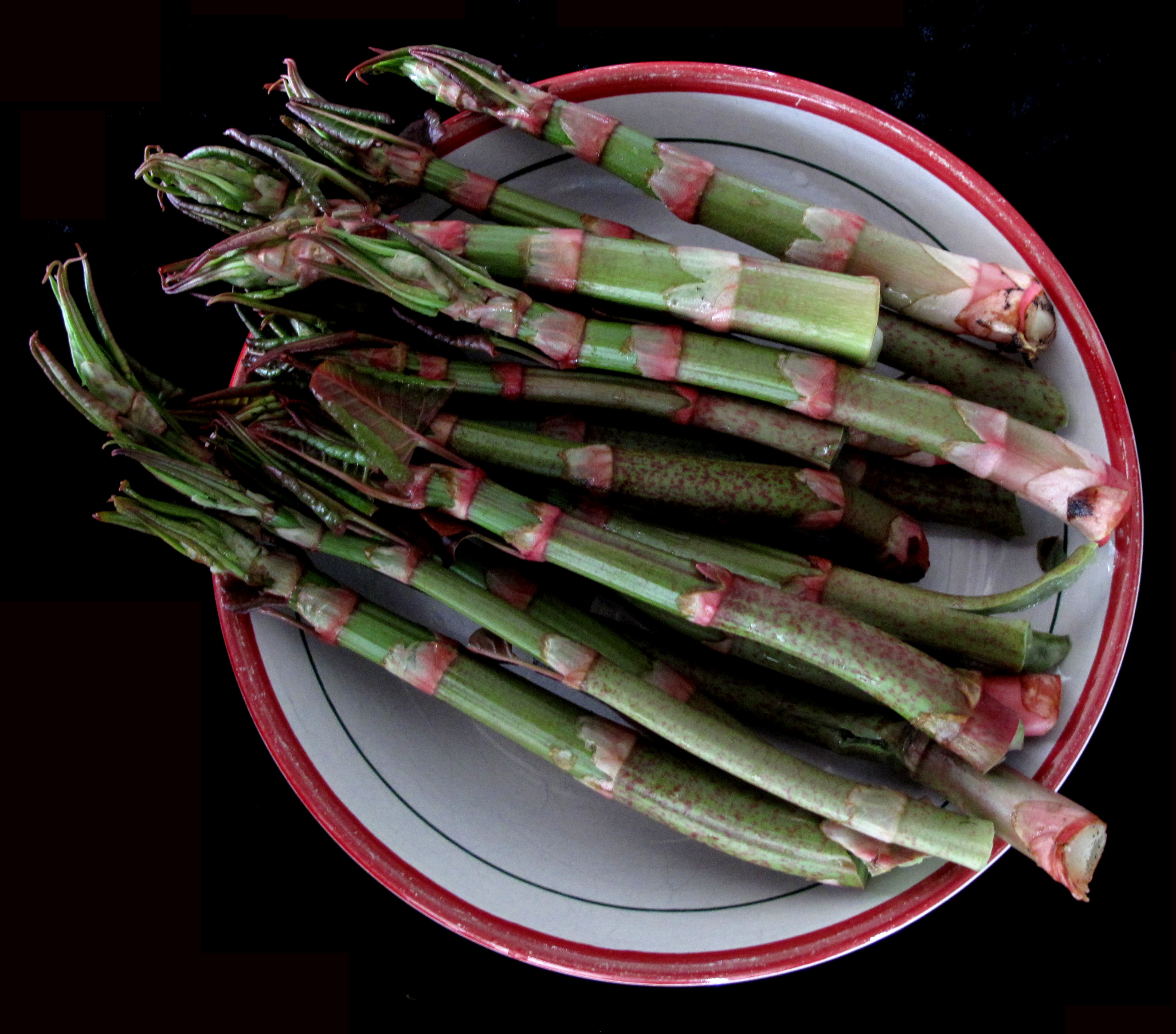
Japanese knotweed shoots, before cooking

It grows widely throughout Japan and is foraged as a wild edible vegetable (sansai), though not in sufficient quantities to be included in statistics. They are called by such regional names as tonkiba (Yamagata), itazuiko (Nagano, Mie), itazura (Gifu, Toyama, Nara, Wakayama, Kagawa), gonpachi (Shizuoka, Nara, Mie, Wakayama), sashi (Akita, Yamagata), jajappo (Shimane, Tottori, Okayama), sukanpo (many areas).

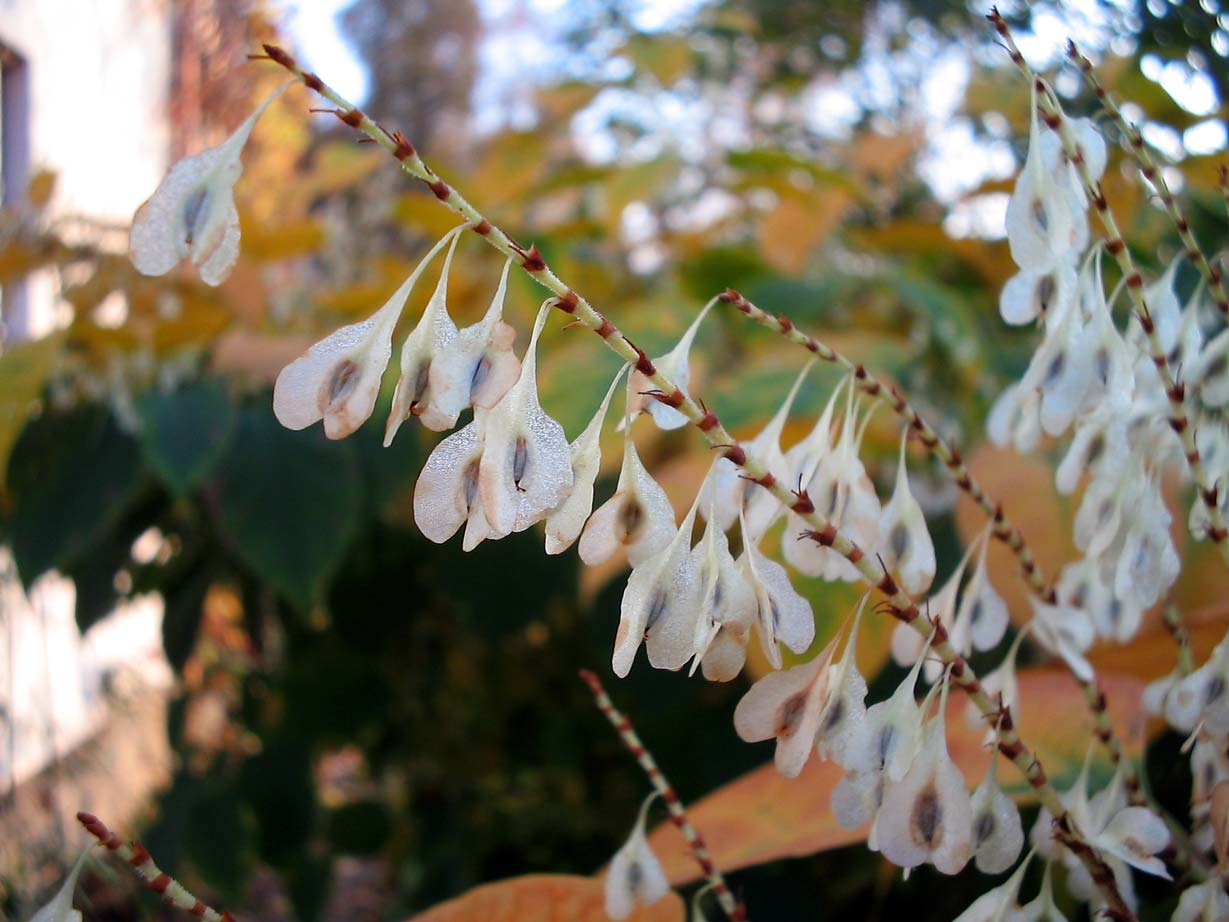

Young leaves and shoots, which look like asparagus, are used. They are extremely sour; the fibrous outer skin must be peeled, soaked in water for half a day raw or after parboiling, before being cooked.

== Common names ==
Common names for Japanese knotweed include fleeceflower, Himalayan fleece vine, billyweed, monkeyweed, monkey fungus, elephant-ear bamboo, pea shooters, donkey rhubarb, American bamboo, and Mexican bamboo, among many others, depending on country and location.

In Japanese, the name is itadori (虎杖, イタドリ), which uses the same kanji as the Chinese name huzhang (虎杖), meaning "tiger staff". (Note: I.e. walking stick or cane.)

== See also ==
- Chinese knotweed
- Persicaria capitata for another plant species called Japanese knotweed
