= Parks and open spaces in London =

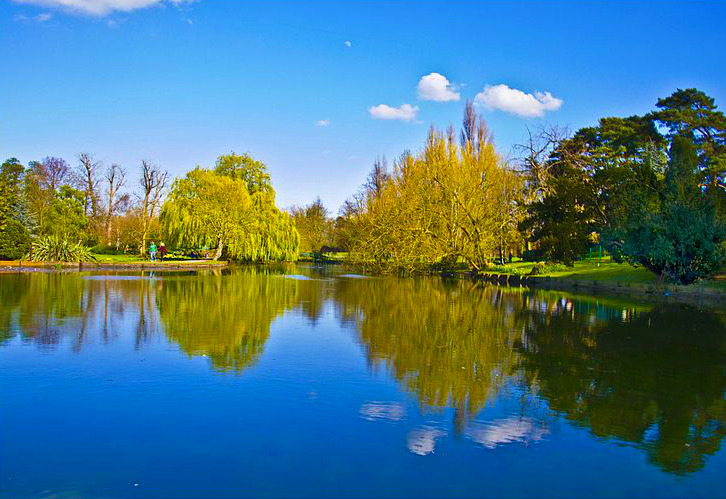
The lake in Beddington Park in the London Borough of Sutton in southwest London

Green space in central London consists of five of the capital's eight Royal Parks, supplemented by a number of small garden squares scattered throughout the city centre. Open space in the rest of the region is dominated by the remaining three Royal Parks and many other parks and open spaces of a range of sizes, run mainly by the local London boroughs, although other owners include the National Trust and the City of London Corporation.

London is made of 40% public green space, including 3,000 parks and totaling 35,000 acres (14,000 ha).

== Royal parks ==
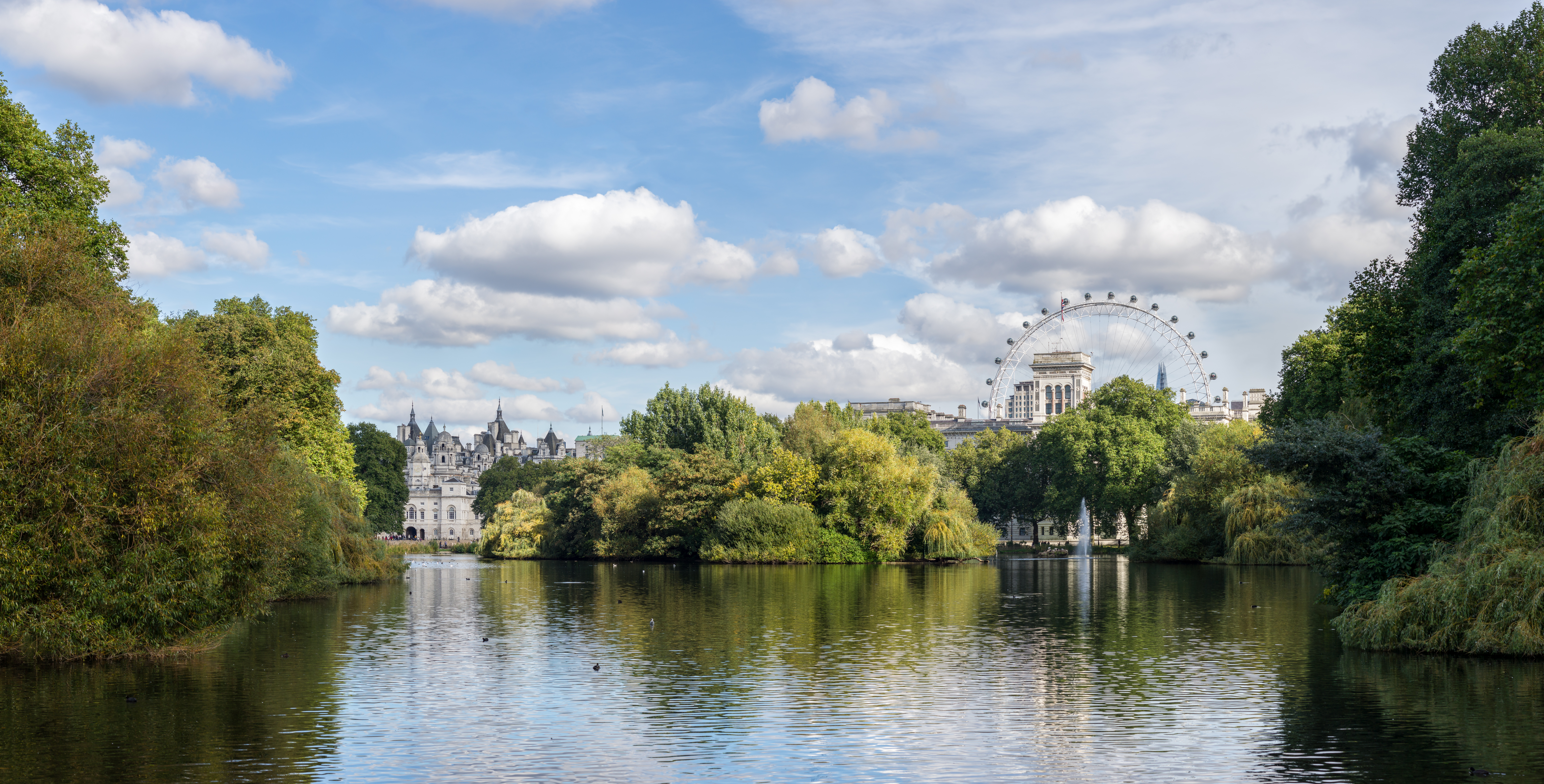
St James's Park Lake in Westminster, looking east from the Blue Bridge towards the London Eye.

The centrepieces of Greater London's park system are the eight Royal Parks of London. Covering 1,976 hectares (4,882 acres), they are former royal hunting grounds which are now open to the public.

- Richmond Park 955 hectares (2,360 acres)
- Bushy Park 445 hectares (1,100 acres)
- Regent's Park 166 hectares (410 acres)
- Hyde Park 140 hectares (350 acres)
- Kensington Gardens 107 hectares (260 acres)
- Greenwich Park 74 hectares (180 acres)
- St James's Park 23 hectares (57 acres)
- Green Park 16 hectares (40 acres)

== Garden squares ==
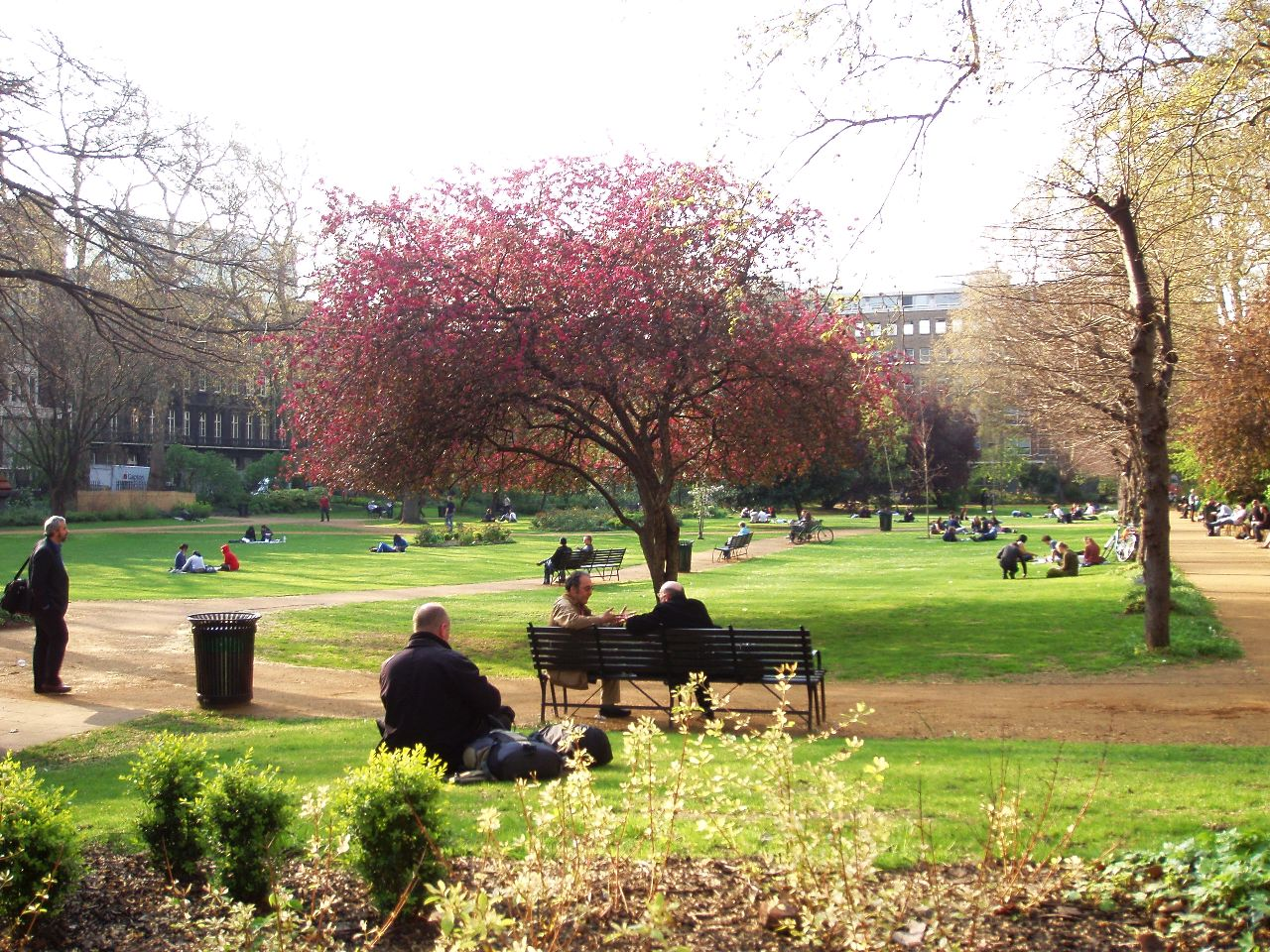
View of the centre of Gordon Square.

Many of the smaller green spaces in central London are garden squares, which were built for the private use of the residents of the fashionable districts, but in some cases are now open to the public. Notable examples open to the public are Russell Square in Bloomsbury, Lincoln's Inn Fields in Holborn and Soho Square in Soho.

The Royal Borough of Kensington and Chelsea contains over a hundred garden squares whose use is restricted to residents. The upkeep of many of these spaces (also named for example Crescents, Gardens, Place) is paid for through a levy on top of residents' council tax.

== Council parks ==
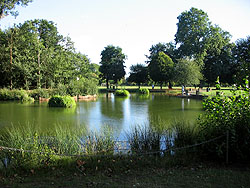
The bathing pond at Victoria Park. Unused for bathing since the 1930s.

In addition to these spaces, a large number of council-owned parks were developed between the mid 19th century and the Second World War.

London Borough of Tower Hamlets

- Victoria Park 86.18 ha (213 acres),

London Borough of Wandsworth

- Battersea Park 83 ha (205 acres).

London Borough of Lewisham

- Beckenham Place Park 96 hectares

London Borough of Bromley

- Crystal Palace Park, South London 80 ha (200 acres)

Lambeth Council

- Brockwell Park 51 hectares (126 acres)

London Borough of Haringey

- Alexandra Park 80 ha (197.68 acres)

- Tottenham Parks

- Bruce Castle park, Tottenham's oldest park.
- Lordship Recreation Ground
- Tottenham Marshes
- Tottenham Cemetery has park grounds.
- Downhills Park
- Chestnuts Park
- Down Lane Park, metropolitan park since 1907 with soccer fields, tennis courts, playground, an outdoor gym and a BMX track for cyclers.
- Markfield Park
- The Green (Tottenham)
- Brunswick Road Open Space
- Chapman's Green

- City of Westminster

- Grosvenor Square

== Other green spaces ==
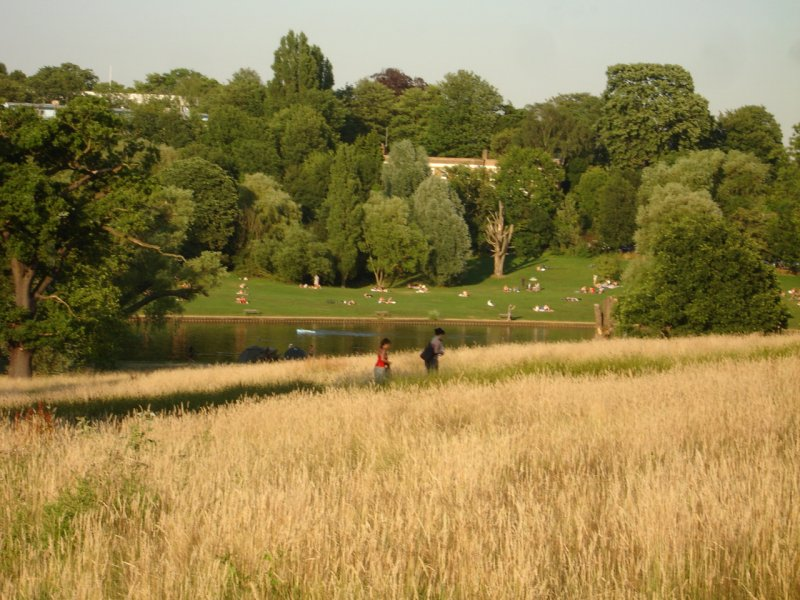
Highgate model boating pond near Parliament Hill

Other major open spaces in the suburbs include:

name	hectares	acres
Thames Chase	9,842	24,320
Epping Forest	2,476	6,118
Wildspace Conservation Park	645	1,593
Wimbledon Common	460	1,136
Hampstead Heath	320	790
Walthamstow Wetlands	211	520
Mitcham Common	182	450
Trent Park	169	418
Hainault Forest Country Park	136	336
Clapham Common	89	220
Wormwood Scrubs	80	200
Wandsworth Common	73	180
Gunnersbury Park	72	178
Tooting Bec Common	62	152
South Norwood Country Park	47	116

They have a more informal and semi-natural character, having originally been countryside areas protected against surrounding urbanisation. Some cemeteries provide extensive green land within the city — notably Highgate Cemetery, burial place of Karl Marx and Michael Faraday amongst others. Completing London's array of green spaces are two paid entrance gardens — the leader is the Royal Botanic Garden at Kew, whilst the royal residence of Hampton Court Palace also has a celebrated garden. All Outer London boroughs contain sections of the Metropolitan Green Belt.

== Commons ==
There are over a hundred registered commons in London, ranging in size from small fragments of land to large expanses.

== Lavender fields ==
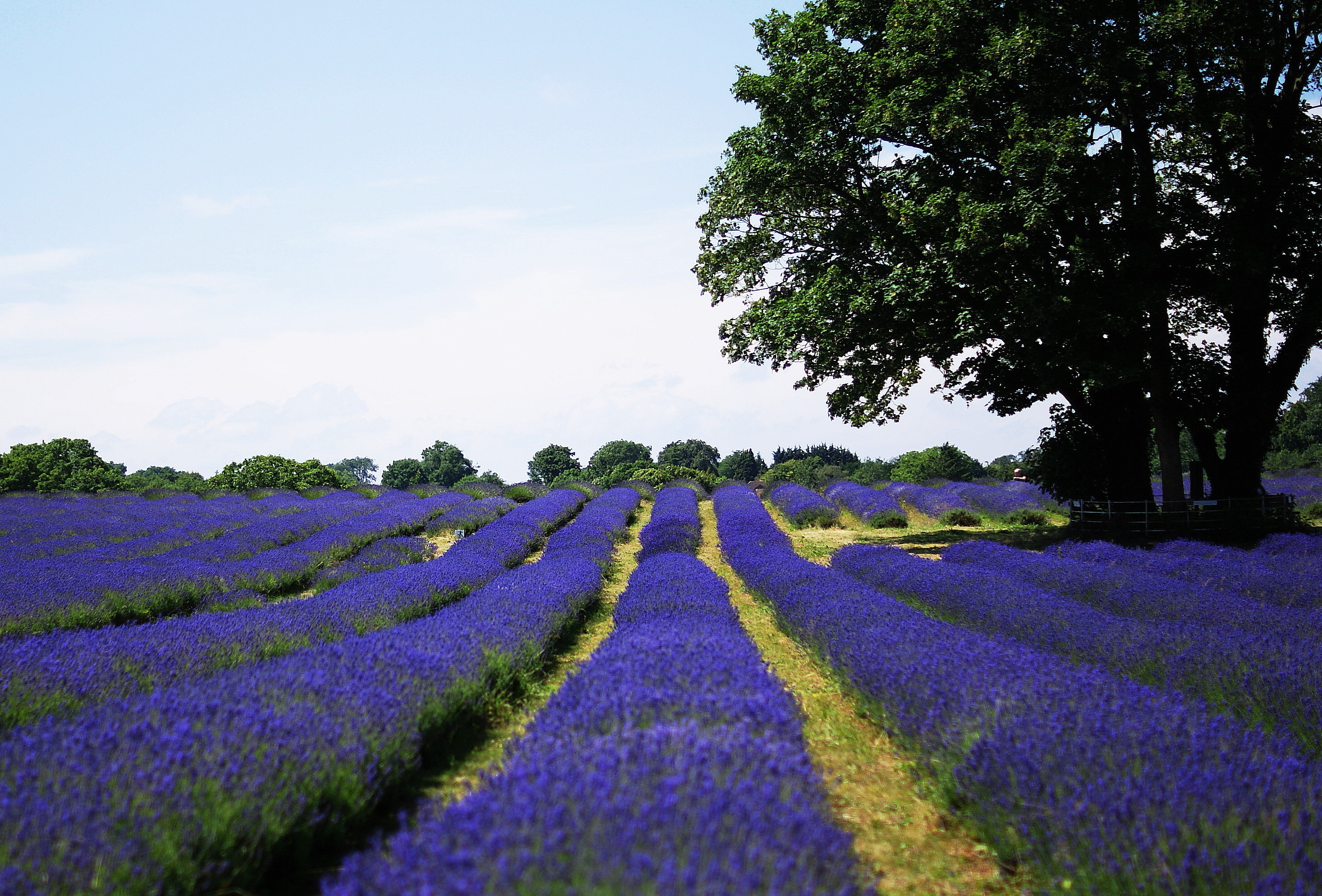
Lavender field in the London Borough of Sutton

There are two historic lavender fields in the London Borough of Sutton. One, at Oaks Way, Carshalton Beeches is three acres in size and is run as a not-for-profit community project. The other, a 25-acre commercial site in Croydon Lane called Mayfield, is popular with tourists. Situated on the North Downs of Surrey, the locality is ideal for lavender cultivation, owing to the chalky free-draining nature of the soil. It was known as the "Lavender Capital of the World" from the 18th to the early 20th centuries, with global production of the plant centred here and blue fields dotting the area.

== Greenways ==
There are several types of London greenways including The Greenway and the Thames Path.

== By location ==
Each borough name links to a list of its parks.
1. City of London
2. Westminster
3. Kensington and Chelsea
4. Hammersmith and Fulham
5. Wandsworth
6. Lambeth
7. Southwark
8. Tower Hamlets
9. Hackney
10. Islington
11. Camden
12. Brent
13. Ealing
14. Hounslow
15. Richmond
16. Kingston upon Thames
17. Merton

18. Sutton
19. Croydon
20. Bromley
21. Lewisham
22. Greenwich
23. Bexley
24. Havering
25. Barking and Dagenham
26. Redbridge
27. Newham
28. Waltham Forest
29. Haringey
30. Enfield
31. Barnet
32. Harrow
33. Hillingdon

== London National Park City ==
London was officially declared the world's first National Park City in July 2019. A National Park City is inspired by the family of National Parks but is not the same as a National Park: it is a “large urban area that is managed and semi-protected through both formal and informal means to enhance the natural capital of its living landscape". It is led by volunteers with a network of supporters and backing from councils' including the Mayor of London with activities linking to the Greater London Authorities' Environment Strategy.

The London National Park City was established by the National Park City Foundation [NPCF], which aims to inspire 25 National Park Cities around the world by 2025.

== See also ==
- List of Sites of Special Scientific Interest in Greater London
- List of Local Nature Reserves in Greater London
- Walking in London
