= Parks and open spaces in the London Borough of Haringey =

The London Borough of Haringey maintains 240 hectares (590 acres) of parks and open spaces. By 2015, 20 of these were accredited with a Green Flag Award. Until their disbandment in April 2009, the parks were patrolled by the Haringey Parks Constabulary.

== List of Parks and open spaces ==
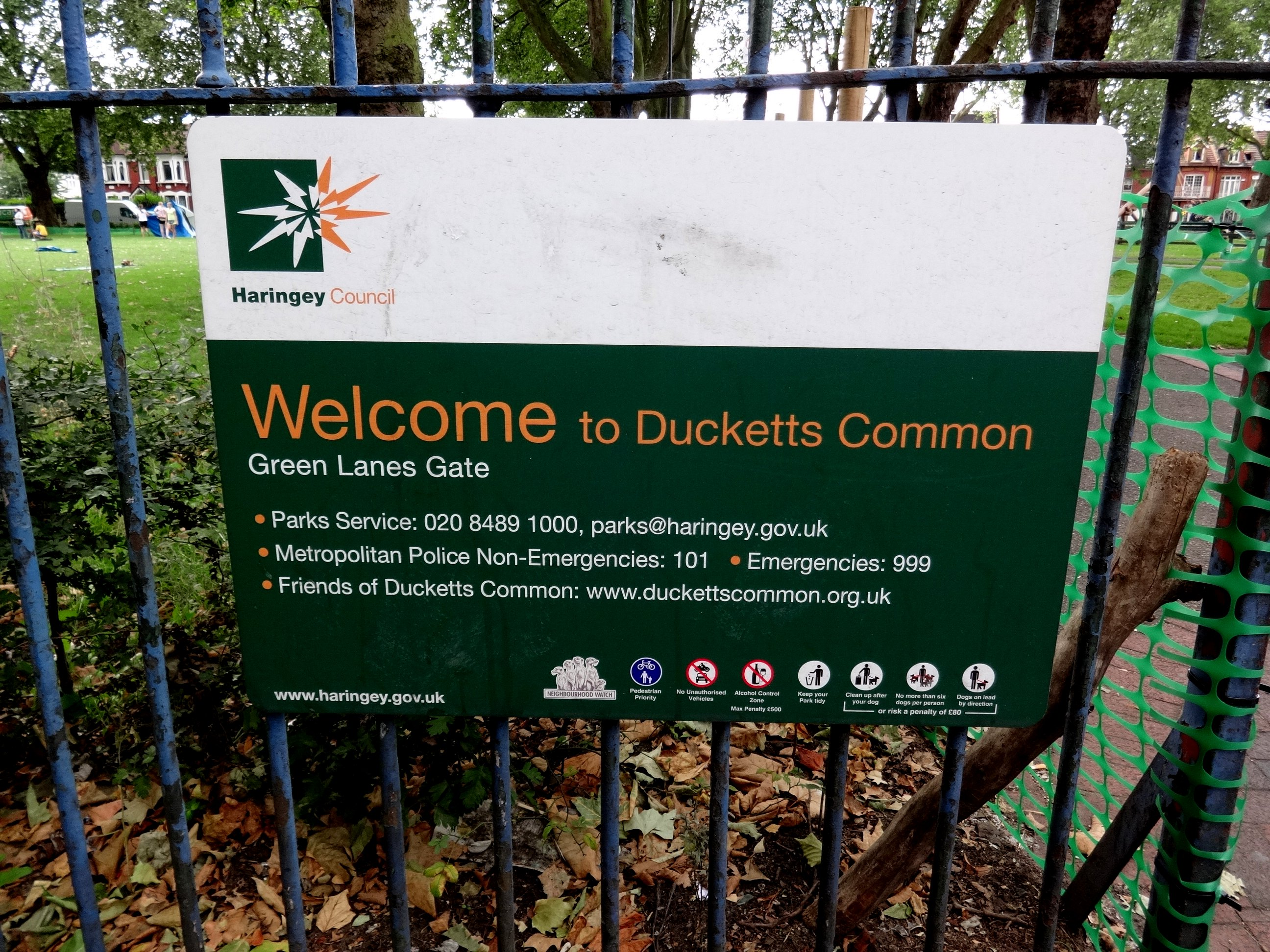
Park signage placed by Haringey council

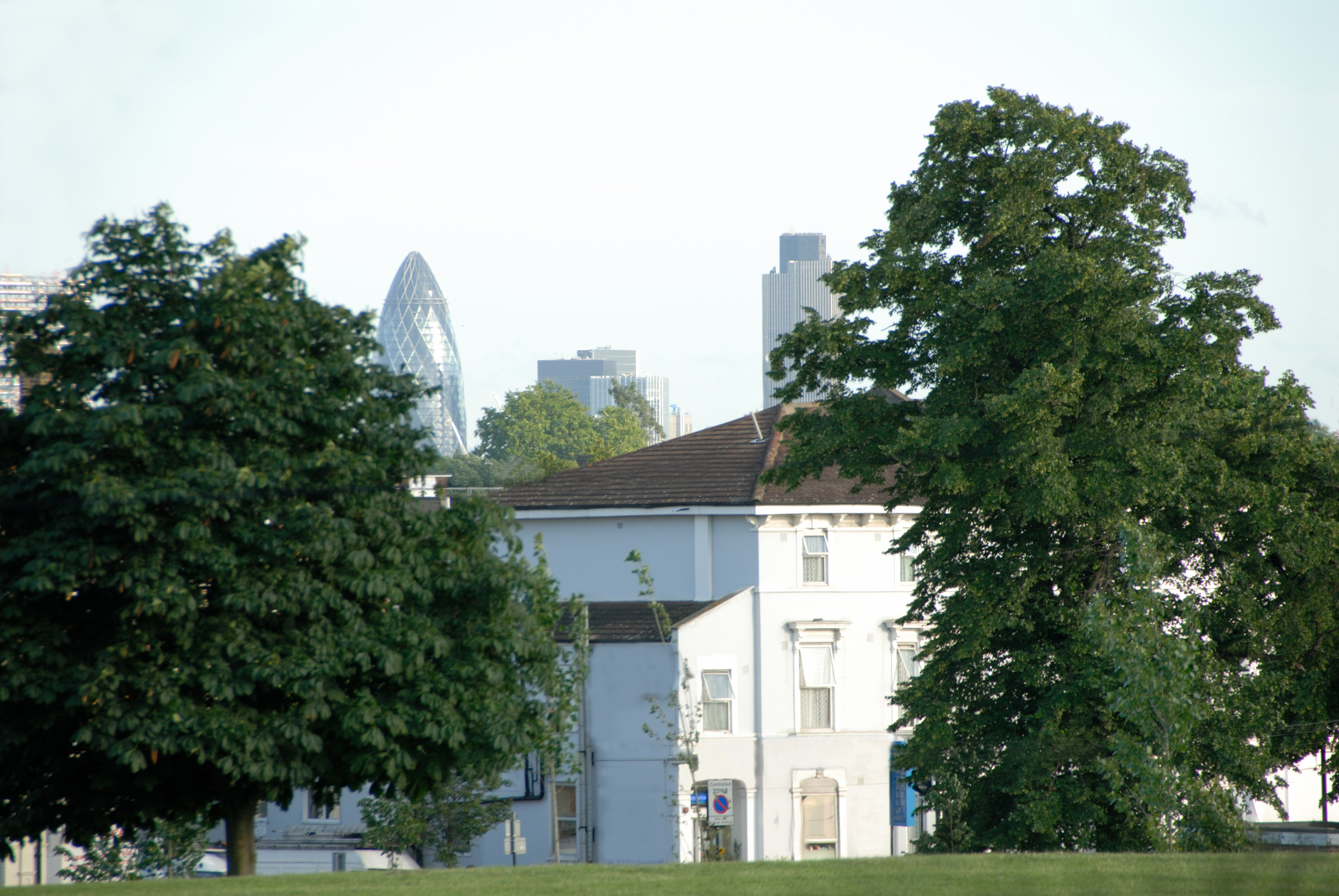
View of the City of London from Finsbury Park

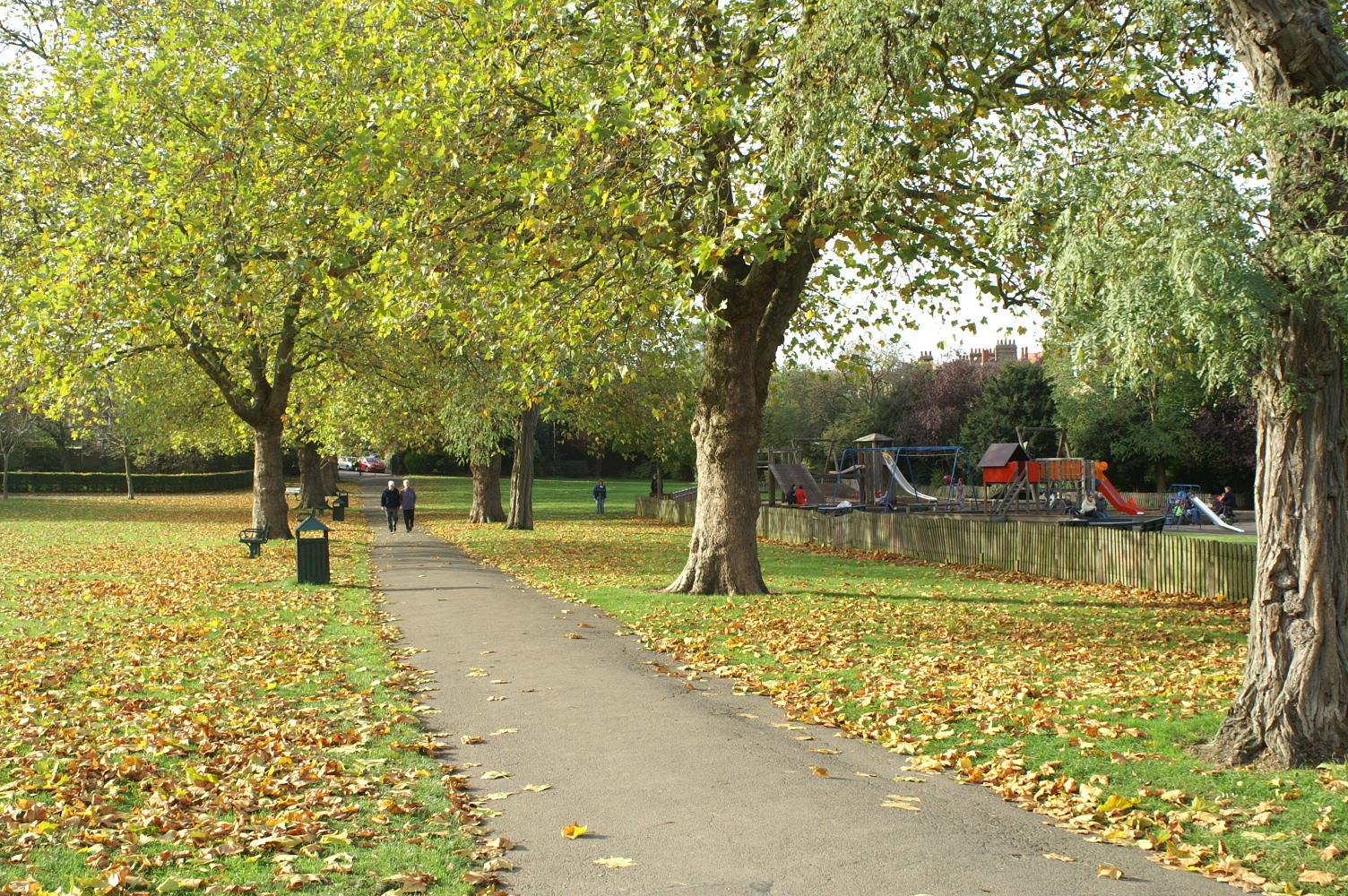
Priory Park, looking towards Abbeville Road

- Albert Road Recreation Ground
- Belmont Recreation Ground
- Bluebell Wood
- Bruce Castle Park
- Chapmans Green
- Chestnuts Park
- Coldfall Wood
- Downhills Park
- Down Lane Park
- Ducketts Common
- Fairland Park
- Finsbury Park
- Granville Road Spinney
- Hartington Park
- Lordship Recreation Ground
- Manchester Gardens
- Markfield Park
- Muswell Hill Playing Fields
- The Paddock
- Paignton Park
- Priory Park
- Railway Fields
- Russell Park
- Stanley Road Open Space
- Stationers Park
- Tottenham Green
- Wood Green Common
- Woodside Park

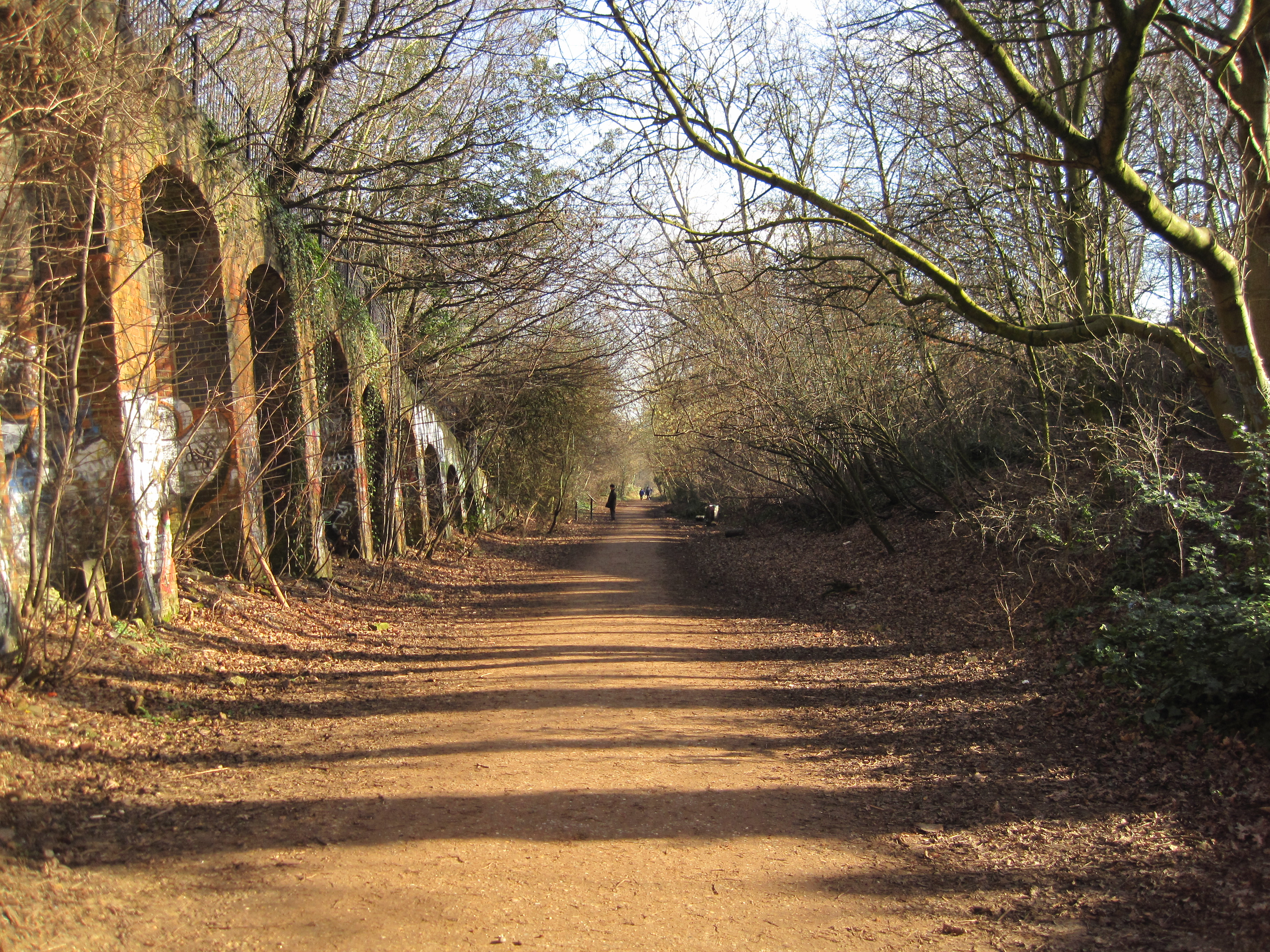
Parkland walk follows the route of an abandoned railway.

=== Local Nature Reserves ===
Haringey Council maintains three local nature reserves.

- Parkland Walk (joint managed with Islington council).
- Queen's Wood
- Railway Fields

=== Parks not maintained by Haringey Council ===
- Highgate Wood which is maintained by the Corporation of London.
- Tottenham Marshes which is maintained by Lee Valley Regional Park Authority (which Haringey Council contributes to financially).
- Alexandra Park which is maintained by Alexandra Palace.

== See also ==
- Parks and open spaces in London
