= Finsbury Park =

Public park in Haringey, London, England

Coordinates: 51.5712°N 0.1009°W

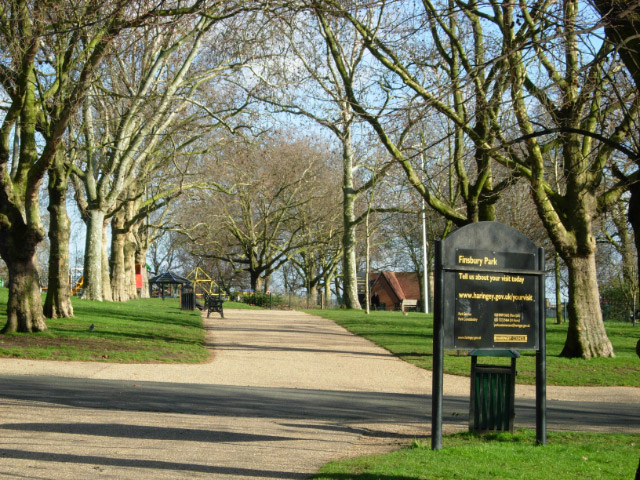
- Interactive map of Finsbury Park
- Location: Harringay, London
- Area: 110 acres (45 ha)
- Opened: 1869
- Designer: Frederick Manable
- Operator: London Borough of Haringey
- Open: 24 hours
- Awards: Green Flag Award 2007–2018
- Designation: Grade II Listed
- Public transit: Finsbury Park, Manor House, Harringay, Harringay Green Lanes

Finsbury Park is a public park in Harringay, north London, England. The park lies on the southern-most edge of the London Borough of Haringey. It is in the area formerly covered by the historic parish of Hornsey, succeeded by the Municipal Borough of Hornsey. It was one of the first of the great London parks laid out in the Victorian era. The park borders the neighbourhoods of Finsbury Park, Stroud Green, and Manor House.

Finsbury Park should not be confused with Finsbury, which is a district of Central London roughly 3 miles (5 km) to the south, forming the south-eastern part of the London Borough of Islington.

== History ==
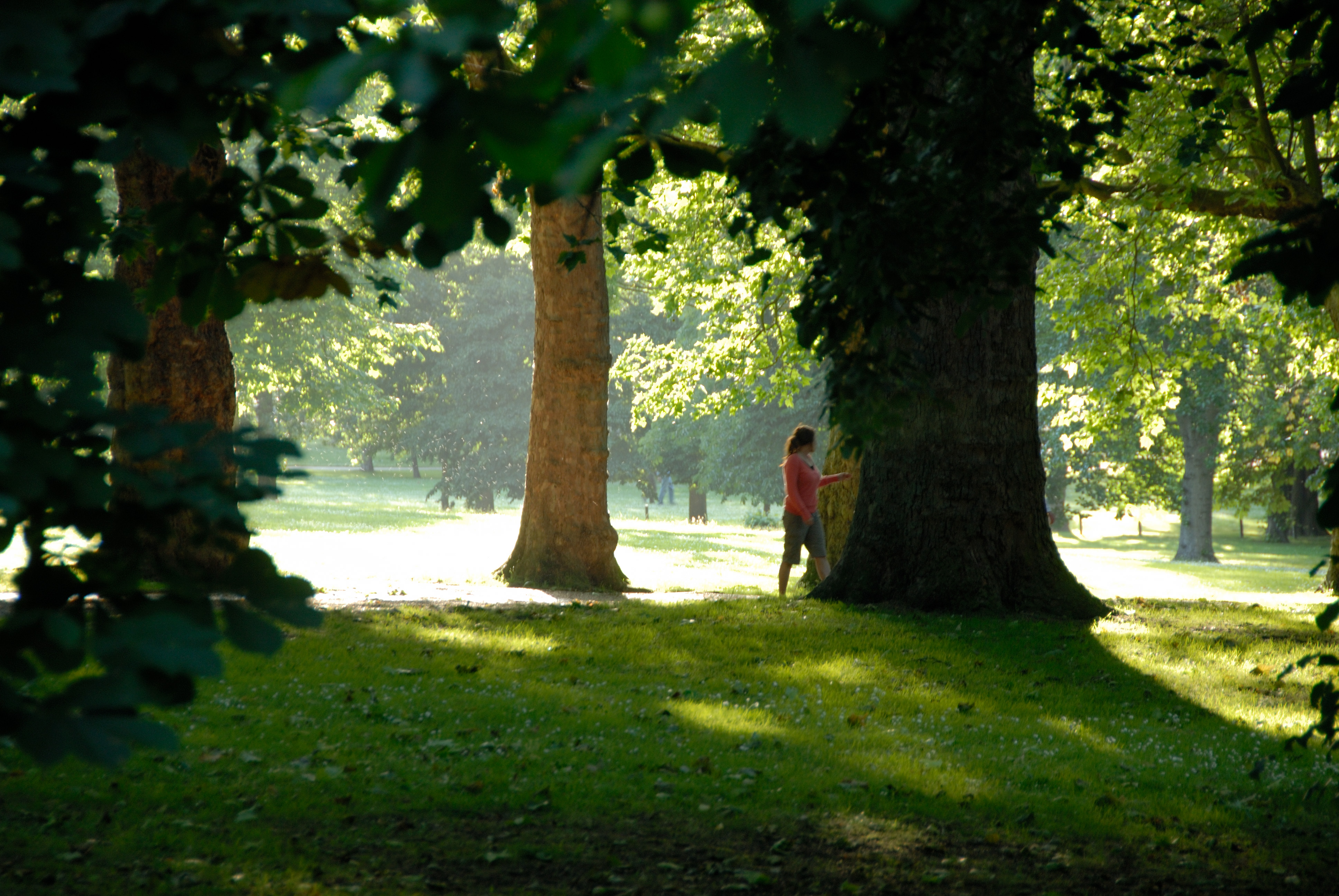
Sunset in Finsbury Park

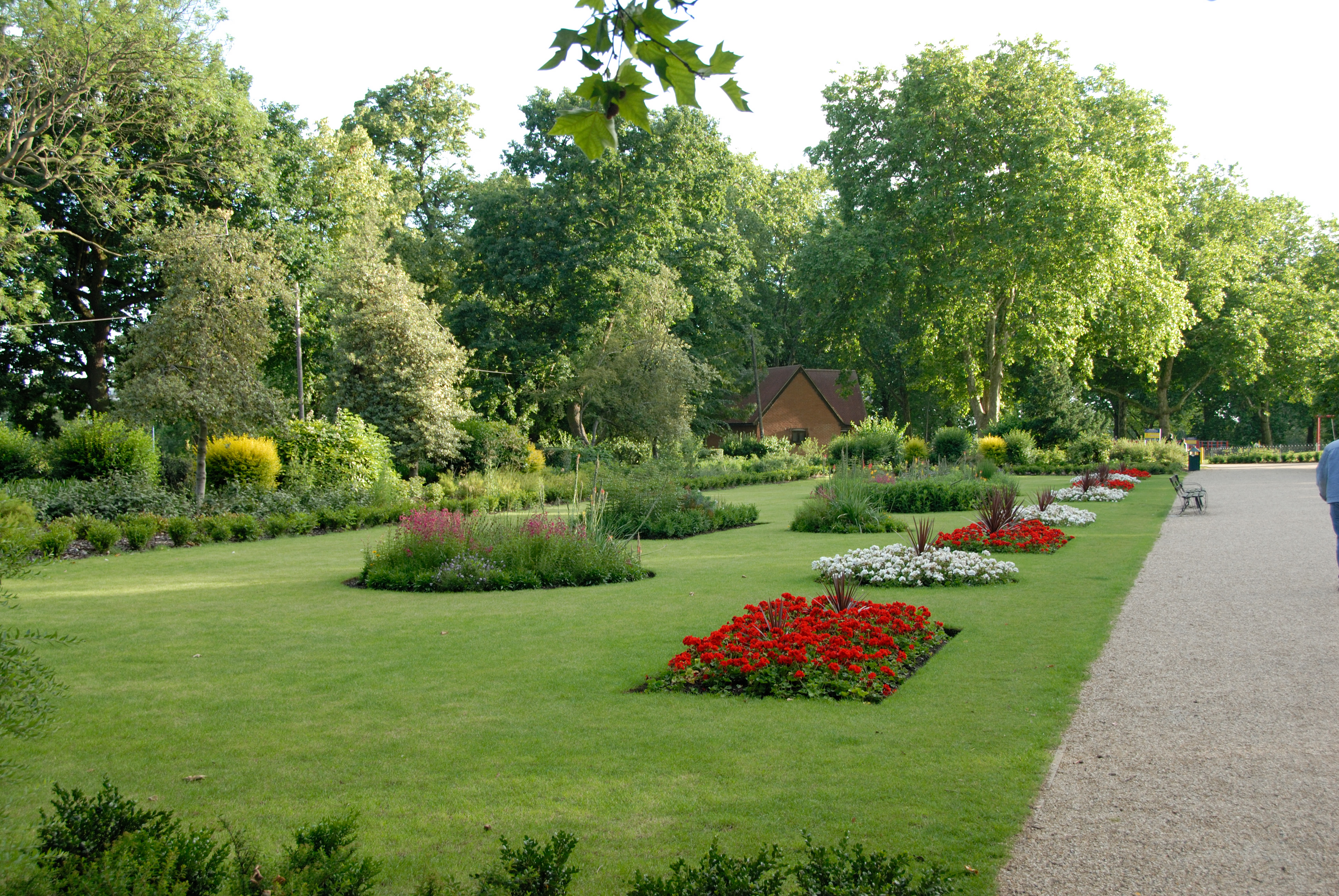
Mackenzie Garden, Finsbury Park

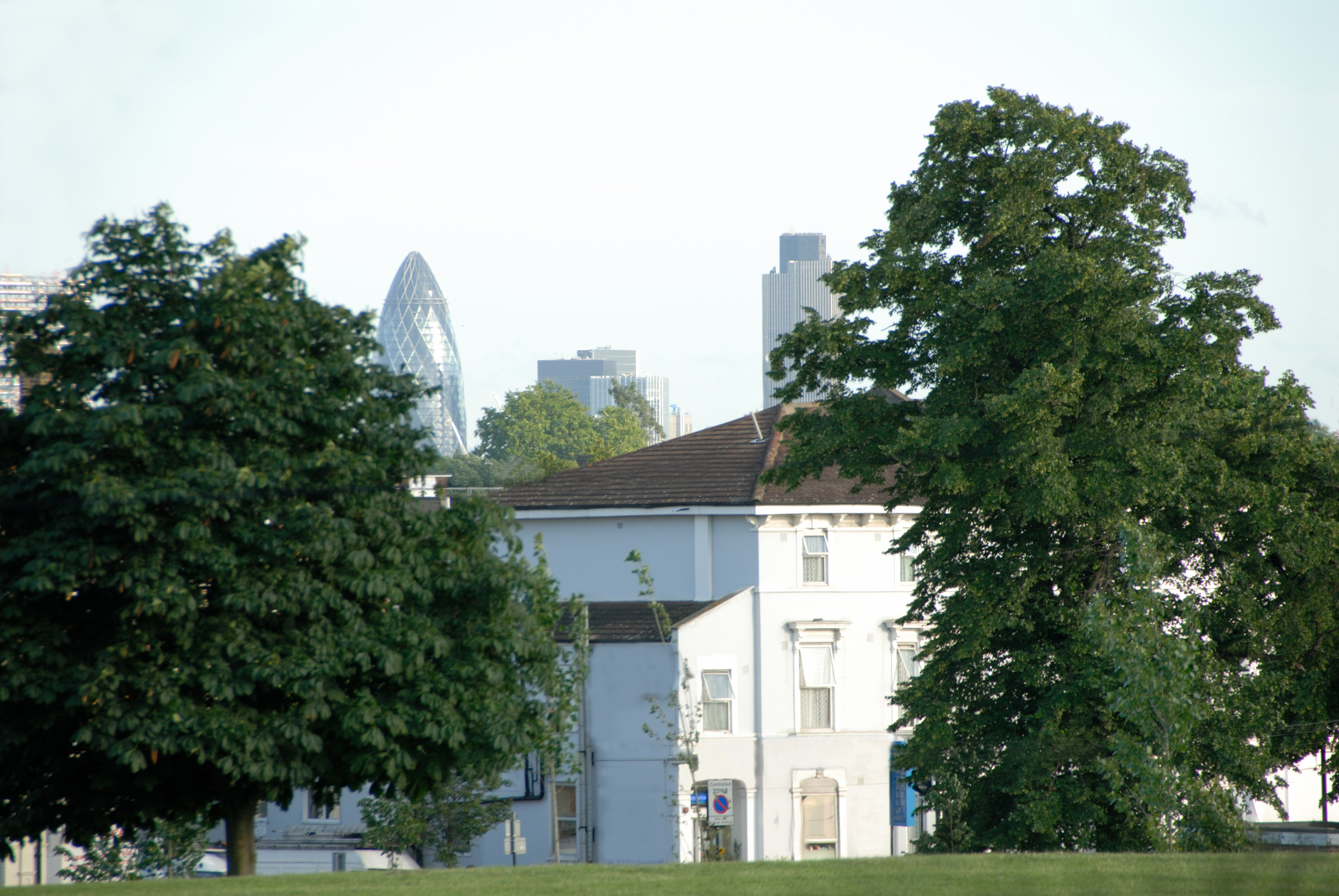
View of The City from Finsbury Park

=== Before the park ===
The park was landscaped on the northeastern extremity of what was originally a woodland area in the Manor or Prebend of Brownswood. It was part of a large expanse of woodland called Hornsey Wood that was cut further and further back for use as grazing land during the Middle Ages. In the mid-18th century a tea room had opened on the knoll of land on which Finsbury Park is situated. Londoners would travel north to escape the smoke of the capital and enjoy the last remains of the old Hornsey Wood. Around 1800 the tea rooms were developed into a larger building which became known as the Hornsey Wood House/Tavern. A lake was also created on the top of the knoll with water pumped up from the nearby New River. There was boating, a shooting and archery range, and probably cock fighting and other blood sports. The Hornsey Wood Tavern was demolished in the process of making the area into a park, but the lake was enlarged. Once the park had opened, a pub across the road from its eastern entrance along Seven Sisters Road called itself the Hornsey Wood Tavern after the original. This pub was later renamed the Alexandra Dining Room and closed for business in April 2007. It was subsequently demolished.

=== Creation of the park ===
During the early part of the second quarter of the 19th century, following developments in Paris, Londoners began to demand the creation of open spaces as an antidote to the ever-increasing urbanisation of London. In 1841 the people of Finsbury on the northern perimeter of the City of London petitioned for a park to alleviate conditions of the poor. The present-day site of Finsbury Park was one of four suggestions for the location of a park.

Finsbury Park Act 1857
- Act of Parliament
- Parliament of the United Kingdom
- Long title: An Act to enable the Metropolitan Board of Works to form a Park for the Northern Suburbs of the Metropolis, to be called Finsbury Park.
- Citation: 20 & 21 Vict. c. cl

Dates
- Royal assent: 17 August 1857

Text of statute as originally enacted

Originally to be named Albert Park, the first plans were drawn up in 1850. Renamed Finsbury Park, plans for the park's creation were ratified by an act of Parliament, the Finsbury Park Act 1857 (20 & 21 Vict. c. cl). Despite some local opposition, the park was opened in 1869.

One of London's largest subterranean reservoirs – Hornsey Wood Reservoir, capable of holding five million gallons of water, and also known as Finsbury Park Reservoir – was simultaneously constructed underneath part of the park by the East London Waterworks Company. Completed in 1868, the spoils from its construction were used to build up parts of the rest of the park. The reservoir remained in use until the early twenty-first century, and has subsequently been drained and occasionally used as a filming location, such as in Sherlock Holmes (2009) and Paddington (2014).

=== During the wars ===
During the First World War the park was known as a location for pacifist meetings.

During the Second World War, the park was used as military training grounds and also hosted anti-aircraft guns.

=== Regeneration ===
Through the late 20th Century the park began to fall into a state of disrepair with most of the original features gone by the 1980s. This decline was worsened in 1986 when the then owner, Greater London Council, was wound up and ownership was passed on to Haringey Council, but without sufficient funding or a statutory obligation for the park's upkeep.

A £5 million Heritage Lottery Fund Award, made in 2003, enabled significant renovations including cleaning the lake, building a new cafe and children's playground and resurfacing and repairing the tennis courts. The park now contains tennis courts, a running track, a softball field and many open spaces for various leisure activities.

== Facilities ==
The park has a mixture of open ground, formal gardens, avenues of mature trees and an arboretum. There is also a lake home to many species of waterfowl, a children's play area, a cafe and an art exhibition space. Sports facilities in the park include football pitches, a cycling club, a bowling green, a skatepark, an athletics stadium, and tennis and basketball courts. Unusually for London, the park hosts two facilities for "American" sports: an American football field, home to the London Blitz, and diamonds for softball and baseball, home to the London Mets.

The Parkland Walk provides a pedestrian and cycle route that links the park with Crouch Hill Park, Crouch End, and Highgate Underground station.

== Culture ==
=== Live music ===
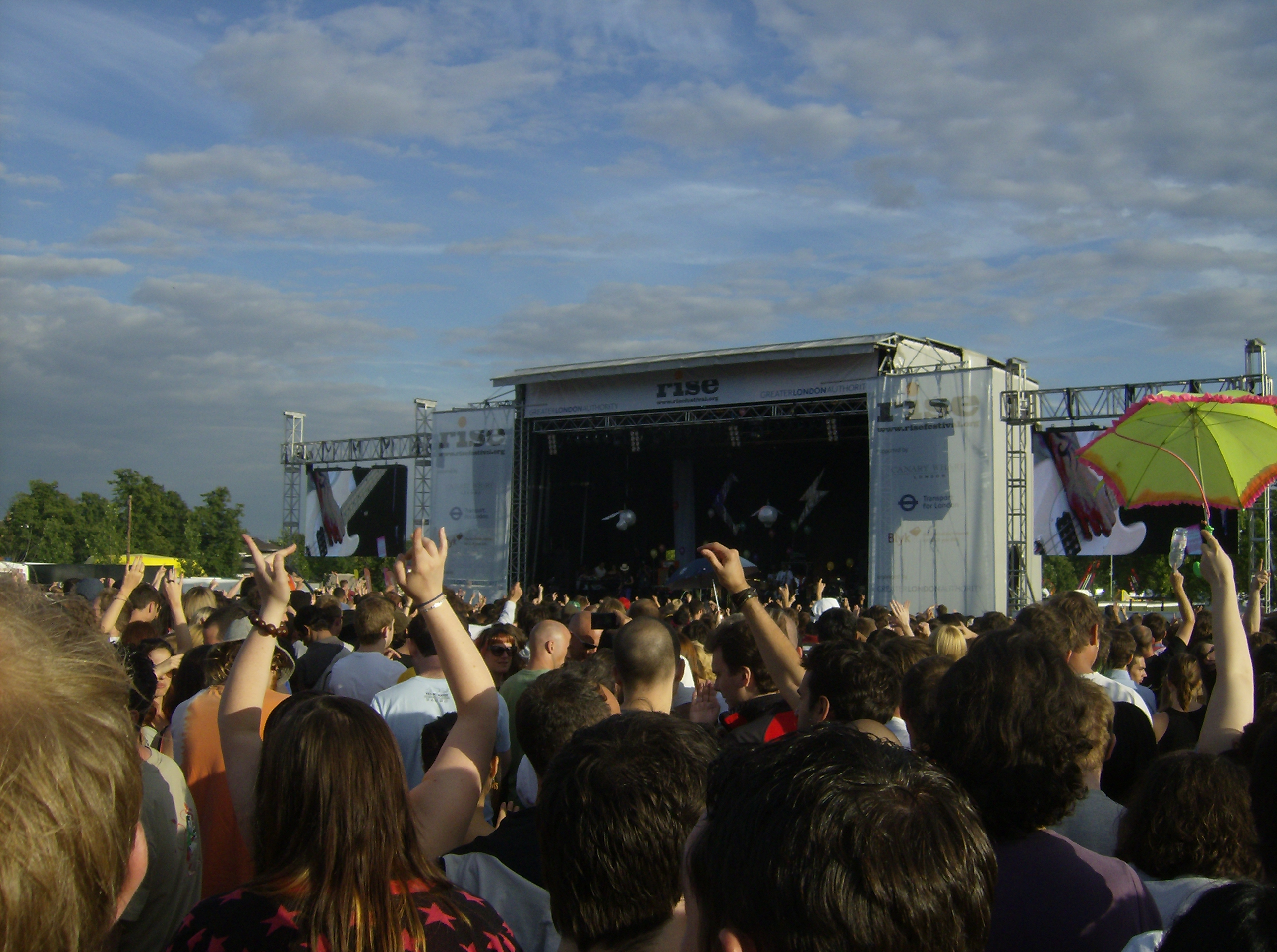
The 2008 Rise Festival being held in Finsbury Park

The park has hosted many live music performances and music festivals including: the Irish-themed Fleadh (Irish for 'festival'; 1990–2003), Great Xpectations Festival (1993), Big Gay Out (2004–2005), Rise Festival (2006–2010) and Wireless Festival (2014–2019, 2022–).

By the 2010s, the number of live festivals decreased, as local council finances were stretched thin. Furthermore, there were the issues of damaged park property and yellowing, unsightly grass, as well as no-entry blockades due to the special events. Local residents would be inconvenienced and prevented from accessing select areas and thoroughfares of the park, often for several days at a time, during the run of a festival. Local MP David Lammy went as far as to say: "There are parts of the park that look like the Serengeti—a bald dust bowl where there was once grass."

A local group, The Friends of Finsbury Park, (unsuccessfully) took Haringey Council to the High Court in a bid to stop future large, live music events. "The group had contended the council had no right to grant the festival permission under the Greater London Parks and Open Spaces Act 1967, claiming Haringey's actions were unlawful because the event shuts off 27 per cent of the park when the maximum permitted by legislation is 10 per cent." They lost the case, but the decision made it abundantly clear that the council held Finsbury Park in trust, and that any funds raised in the park from events must be used for the park itself. This somewhat reduced the number of events in the park, moving forward, but also allowed for more rational investments to be made in improving the park (e.g., maintaining the property, new playgrounds, refreshing the Richard Hope play space, etc.).

=== Filming ===
Finsbury Park has been used as a filming location for music videos such as Groove Armada's "Song 4 Mutya", feature films such as Rachid Bouchareb's London River and TV programmes such as Silent Witness.
