= Moselle Brook =

River in Greater London, England

Coordinates: 51.6045°N 0.0736°W

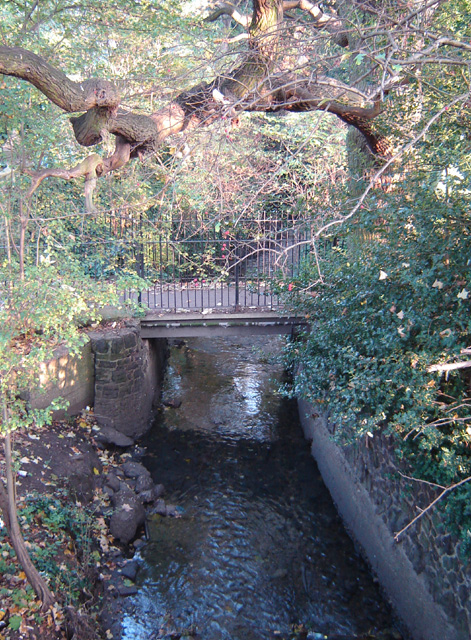
The Moselle Brook visible above ground on its way through Tottenham Cemetery.

The Moselle Brook, also referred to as the River Moselle, is a brook which flows through North London, originating in Muswell Hill and Highgate, then flowing through Tottenham and towards the Lea Valley. It was originally a tributary of the River Lea, but it now flows into Pymmes Brook, another Lea tributary.

The name derives from Mosse-Hill in Hornsey, which also gave its name to the modern district of Muswell Hill, and bears no relationship to that of the Moselle river which flows from France to Germany. For a time it was known as the Moswell.

From its source, the brook flows north-eastward to Lordship Recreation Ground, then to High Road by the junction with White Hart Lane, then along High Road to a point near Scotland Green, and then eastward to the River Lea. It now has a low flow, but once posed a serious flooding threat to Tottenham.

Until the 19th century, the whole of the river remained above ground, but in 1836 the stretch around Tottenham High Road and White Hart Lane was covered. More culverting occurred in 1906 and subsequent years, so that now the river is completely enclosed from Tottenham Cemetery to the point at which it runs into Pymmes Brook.

== See also ==
- Subterranean rivers of London
