= London greenways =

Shared-use paths with vegetation in London

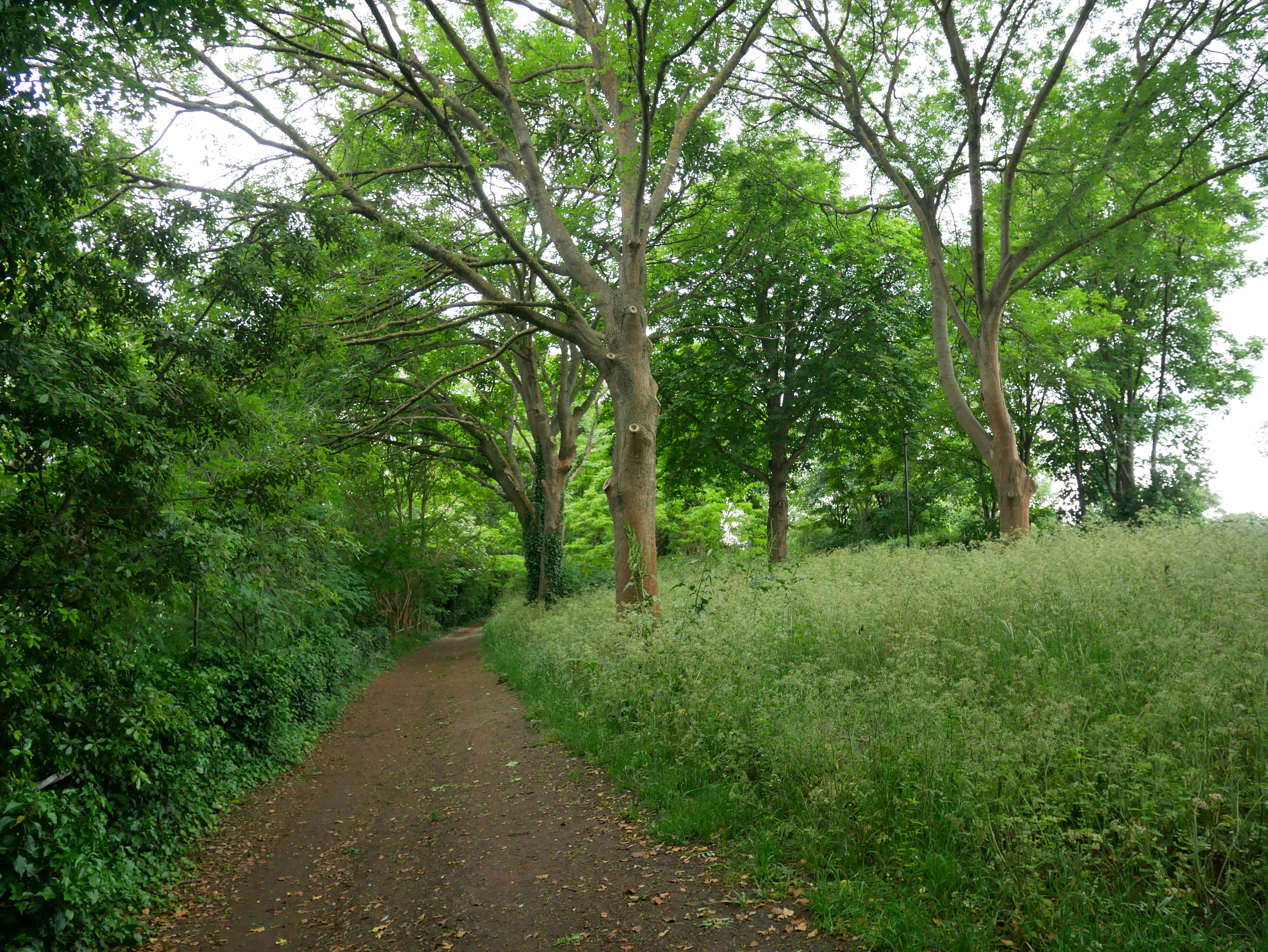
The Thames Path in Chiswick

Many green routes have been planned in London which come within the international definition of a greenway but most of them come under other designations in London. The exception is The Greenway in Newham. Some of the other planned routes which could be described as greenways are: the Thames Path, the South East London Green Chain, the Ridgeway (Thamesmead), the Capital Ring and the Parkland Walk.

The planning of long-distance routes in London began with County of London Plan by Patrick Abercrombie. He saw a deficiency of open space as one of the four main defects of London and believed it could be remedied by planning green corridors, green wedges etc.

== See also ==
- Cycling in London
- List of cycle routes in London
- Parks and open spaces in London
