= Parks and open spaces in the London Borough of Waltham Forest =

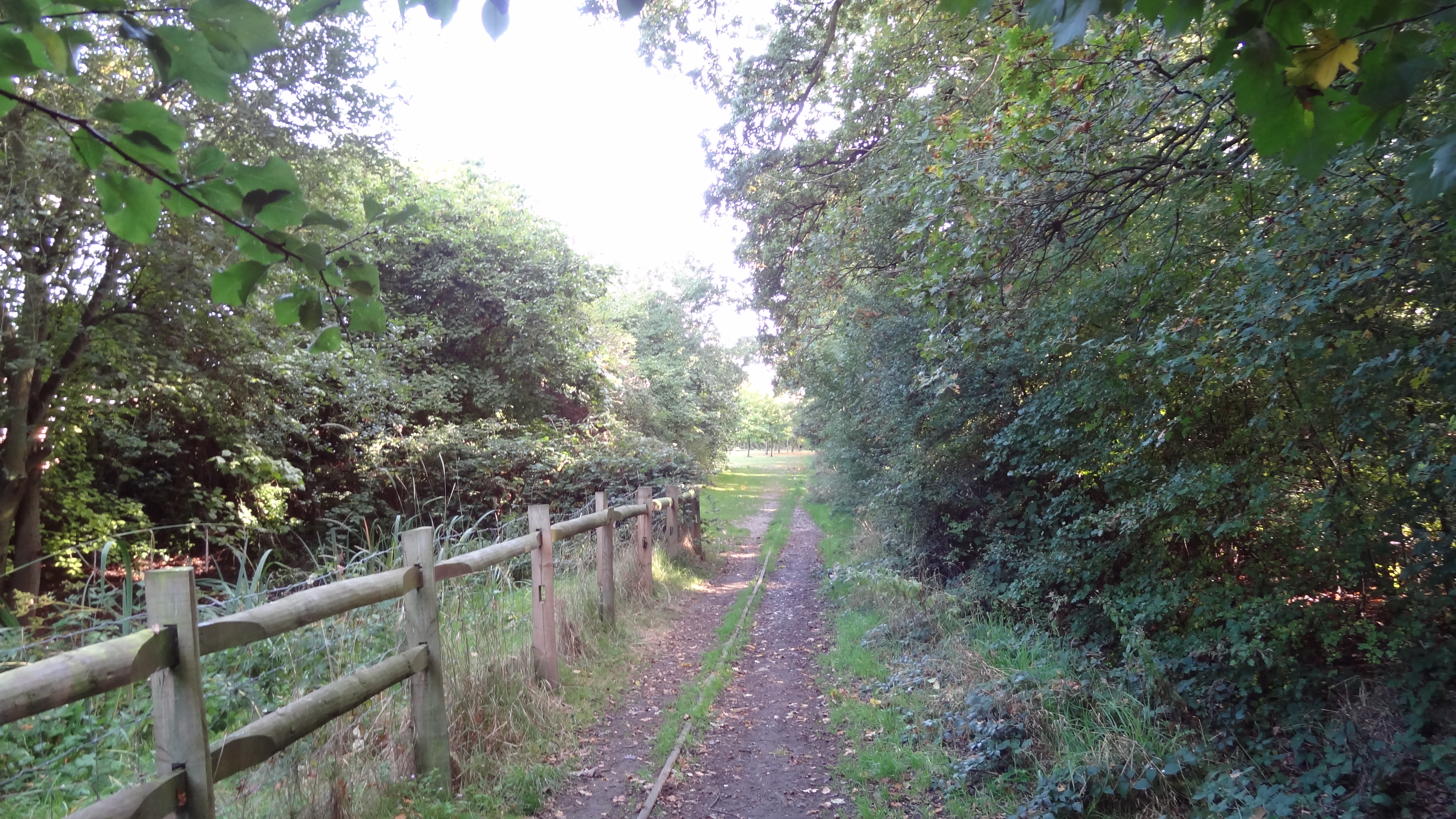
Anslie Wood, an area of Ancient Woodland in Chingford, Waltham Forest

This is a list of Parks and open spaces in the London Borough of Waltham Forest, which contains the most parks of any government district north of the River Thames.

== Ownership and Management ==
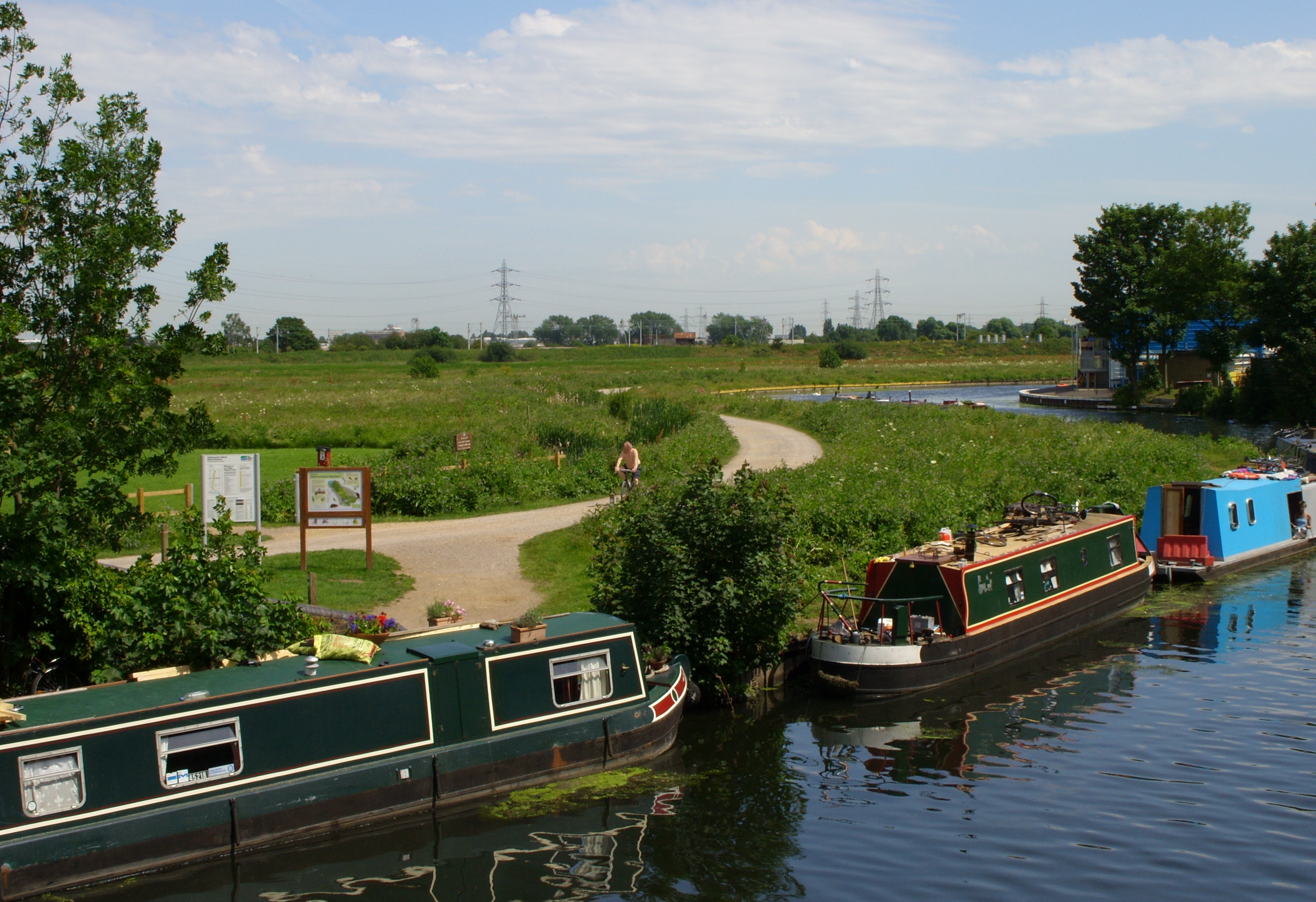
Walthamstow Marshes, an open space managed by Lee Valley Regional Park Authority

Waltham Forest Borough Council (LBWF) owns over 290 hectares (2.9 km^{2}) of open space including parks, sports and recreation grounds and nature reserves. However, other parks and open spaces in the borough are owned and managed by other agencies such as the City of London Corporation, which owns just over 472 hectares (4.72 km^{2}) across 10 sites in the borough and the Lee Valley Regional Park Authority.

== List of Parks and Open Spaces ==
Name	Area	District	Managed by	Description
Abbotts Park	?	Leyton	LBWF	
Ainslie Wood	2.04 hectares (0.02 km^{2})	Chingford	LBWF	Local Nature Reserve and Site of Importance for Nature Conservation.
Coronation Gardens	1.65 hectares (0.02 km^{2})	Leyton	LBWF	
Hatch Forest	?	Chingford	City of London	Part of Epping Forest.
The Highams Park and Highhams Park Lake	?	Chingford	LBWF & City of London	Part of Epping Forest.
Langthorne Park	?	Leytonstone	LBWF	
Leyton Flats	?	Leytonstone	City of London	Part of Epping Forest.
Leyton Jubilee Park	12 hectares (0.12 km^{2})	Leyton	LBWF	
Lloyd Park	3.86 hectares (0.04 km^{2})	Walthamstow	LBWF	Known for being the site of the William Morris Gallery
Memorial Park	?	Chingford	LBWF	
Ridgeway Park	5.34 hectares (0.05 km^{2})	Chingford	LBWF	
Walthamstow Marshes	36.7 hectares (0.37 km^{2})	Walthamstow	Lee Valley Regional Park Authority	Part of Lee Valley Park. A Site of Special Scientific Interest.
Walthamstow Wetlands	211 hectares (2.11 km^{2})	Walthamstow	Thames Water & London Wildlife Trust	Nature Reserve and Site of Special Scientific Interest.
