= Ann Conolly =

British botanist

- Born: 25 January 1917; Kenley, Surrey, England
- Died: 17 August 2010 (aged 93); Oadby, Leicestershire, England
- Education: Cambridge University
- Scientific career
- Fields: Botanist
- Workplaces: Bedford College, University of London; University of Leicester
- Doctoral advisor: Harry Godwin

Ann P. Conolly (1917–2010) was a British botanist and teacher who contributed to quaternary botany and conducted important early work on the history and spread of Japanese Knotweed in the UK.

== Academic career ==
She attended the University of Cambridge (Newnham College) from 1936 to 1940 and studied Natural Sciences. However, it was the university's policy at that time to not award degrees to women. She undertook doctoral studies on quaternary botany between 1940 and 1943, supported by a Rigby and a Francis Maitland Balfour studentships, under the supervision of Professor Harry Godwin. Her work contributed to Godwin's landmark book History of the British Flora published by CUP in 1956. Events in the Second World War meant that despite publishing several papers, she never submitted her thesis.

Her first academic post commenced in 1944 as a demonstrator at Bedford College for Women, University of London, with conditional exemption from military service. In 1947 she was appointed as lecturer at University College of Leicester (later University of Leicester) teaching plant classification, anatomy and distribution, where she remained until she retired in 1982. Her teaching of plant geography and taxonomy, especially the annual field course, were an inspiration to future botanists.

Her research interest was initially quaternary botany but she developed several others. She was one of the first to become involved in the BSBI mapping scheme in the early 1950s and was principal recorder for at least six 10 km squares in North Wales. The flora of the Lleyn Peninsula, North Wales was a focus of her research for 50 years, especially the region around Pwllheli, continuing southwest of the A497 to Morfa Nefyn, mapped in 1km squares. However, her Lleyn Peninsula work remains unpublished for unknown reasons. This expertise led to her becoming part of the management and recording of the natural history of Bardsey Island.

Later Japanese Knotweed (Fallopia japonica, subsequently reclassified as Reynoutria japonica) became her major research focus.

She was made an Honorary Member of the BSBI in 2009 in recognition of her work for the society's meetings and publications. In 2012, Conolly was posthumously honoured as one of thirteen celebrated female botanists in the "Inspirational Botanists - Women of Wales" exhibition at the National Botanic Garden of Wales.

== Research on Japanese knotweed ==
Japanese knotweed (Reynoutria japonica), native to Asia, is one of the most damaging invasive alien plants in the world. It became her major research focus and led to publication of a groundbreaking analysis of the history and distribution of this invasive weed in 1977. She continued with this research for a further 20 years during her retirement. She used specimens from herbaria and information from the horticultural literature in Europe to show how the group of plants now called Japanese Knotweed changed from prizewinners in the Netherlands in 1847 to notifiable weeds in the UK in 1981. Her distribution maps showed how the Knotweed hybrids spread across the UK.

An unusual hybrid knotweed, Conolly's knotweed, ×Reyllopia conollyana (syn. Fallopia × conollyana) was named in her honour in 2001 for her 84th birthday. This is a hybrid between Japanese knotweed and Russian vine (Fallopia baldschuanica).

== Personal life ==
Conolly attended the private Montessori school in Purley followed by Eothen Girls School in Caterham (head girl 1934–5). She contracted polio in her teens when visiting continental Europe that resulted in impairment to her right leg. She died 17 August 2010.

== Non-Academic Work ==
During the Vietnam War, Ann Connolly and other professors from the University of Leicester and 26 other institutions wrote to The Times. They intended to reverse British support for the United States of America's occupation of Vietnam.

== Significant publications ==
- Bailey, J. P. Conolly, A. P. (2000) Prize-winners to pariahs – A history of Japanese Knotweed s.l. (Polygonaceae) in the British Isles. Watsonia 23 (1) 93–110
- Bailey, J. P. Child, L. E. Conolly, A. P. (1996) A survey of the distribution of Fallopia X bohemica (Chrtek and Chrtkova) J. Bailey (Polygonaceae) in the British Isles. Watsonia 21 (2) 187–198
- Beerling, DJ, Bailey, JP, Conolly AP (1994) Fallopia japonica (Houtt) Ronse, Decraene (Reynoutria japonica Houtt, Polygonum cuspidatum Sieb and Zucc). J Ecology 82 (4) 959–979
- A Conolly (1994) Castles and abbeys in Wales: refugia for 'mediaeval' medicinal plants. Botanical Journal of Scotland 46 (4) 628–636
- Conolly, A.P. (1977) The distribution and history in the British Isles of some alien species of Polygonum and Reynoutria. Watsonia 11 291–311
- Conolly, AP, Dahl, E (1970) Maximum summer temperature in relation to the modern and Quaternary distributions of certain arctic-montane species in the British Isles Part 1. The modern relationships in Studies in the vegetational history of the British Isles. Cambridge University Press. p175
- Conolly, AP, Dickson, JH. (1969) A note on a late Weichselian splachnum capsule from Scotland. New Phytologist 68 (1) 197-
- Conolly, A.P., Godwin, H. and Megaw, E.M. (1950) Studies in the Post-Glacial History of British Vegetation. XI. Late-Glacial Deposits in Cornwall. Philosophical Transactions of the Royal Society B 234 (615) p397- DOI: 10.1098/rstb.1950.0006
