= × Reyllopia =

Haringey knotweed

Scientific classification
- Kingdom: Plantae
- Clade: Tracheophytes
- Clade: Angiosperms
- Clade: Eudicots
- Order: Caryophyllales
- Family: Polygonaceae
- Subfamily: Polygonoideae
- Genus: × Reyllopia; Holub
- Species: × R. conollyana

Binomial name
- × Reyllopia conollyana (J.P.Bailey) Galasso

Synonyms
- Fallopia × conollyana J.P.Bailey

Hybrid genus of flowering plant

× Reyllopia is a hybrid genus with a single known species, × Reyllopia conollyana (synonym Fallopia × conollyana), the Haringey knotweed or railway-yard knotweed. The species is a hybrid between Japanese knotweed (Reynoutria japonica) and the Russian vine (Fallopia baldschuanica). The only known wild British population was discovered ("new to science") by David Bevan at Railway Fields in 1987.

It was named in honour of Ann Conolly in 2001 for her 84th birthday. At the time, both parents were considered to be in the genus Fallopia.
