= Beckton District Park =

Park in Newham

Coordinates: 51.51155°N 0.04814°E

Beckton District Park is a public park in Beckton in the London Borough of Newham. Together with King George V Park, it forms Beckton District Park and Newham City Farm, a Site of Borough Importance for Nature Conservation, Grade II.

The part of the park north of the Tollgate Road is sometimes marked on maps as Beckton District Park North, and the land east of Stanfeld Road as Beckton District Park South.

The Capital Ring goes through the park and connects the North and South parts of the park via a footpath.

== Beckton District Park North ==
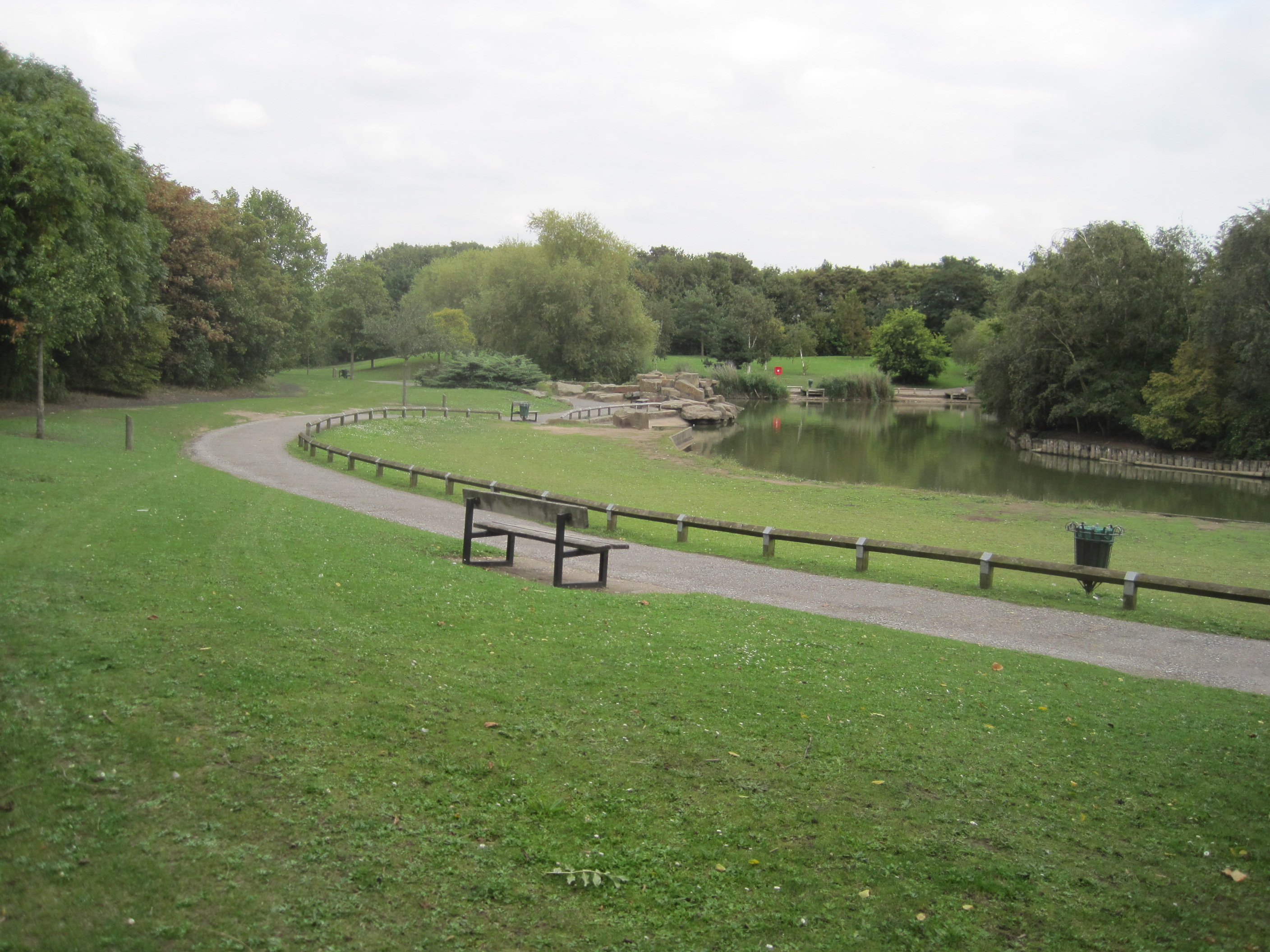
Beckton District Park North

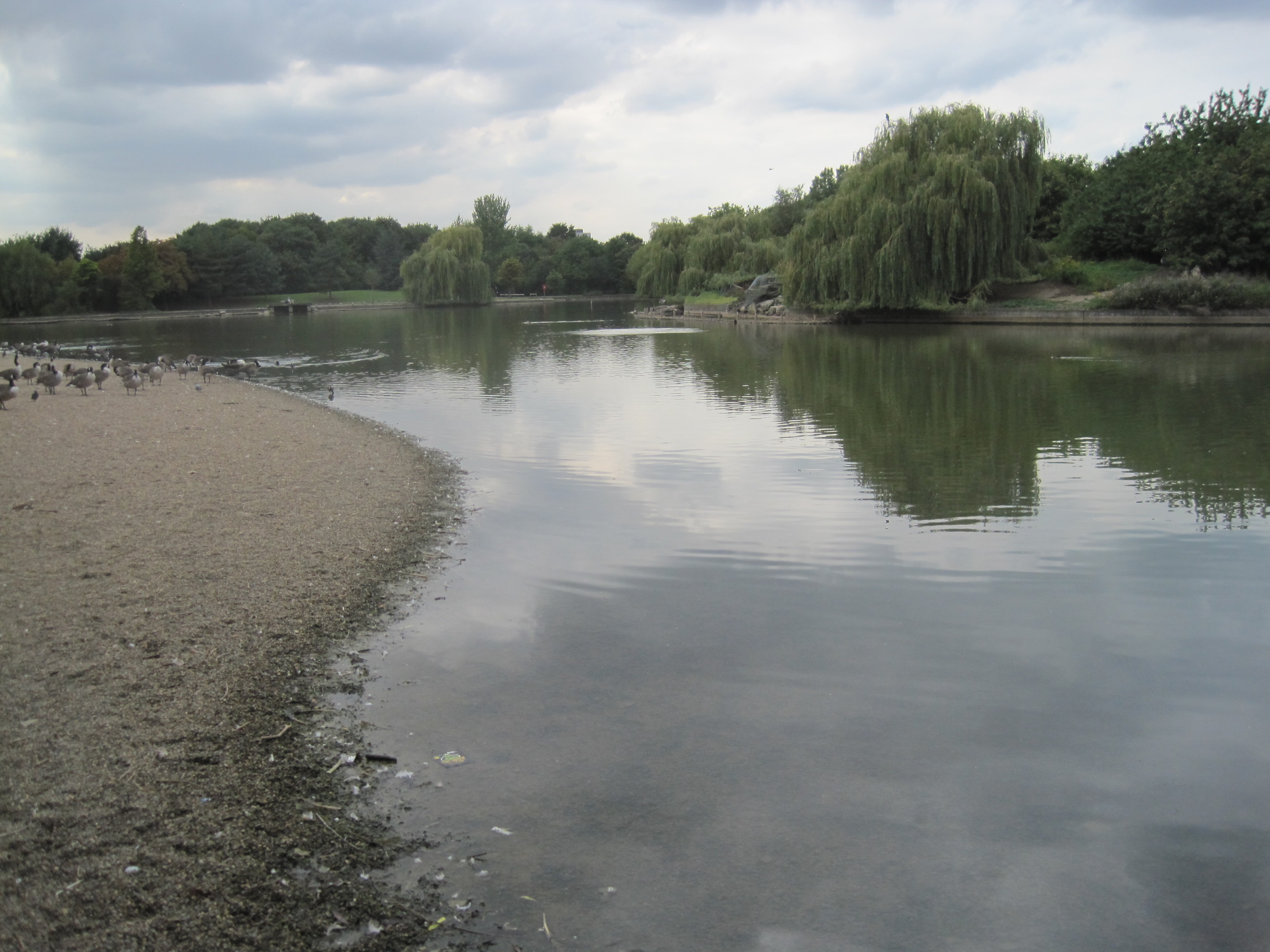
Beckton District Park North

There is access from Newham Way and Sheerwater Road, and Tollgate Road separates the park from Beckton District Park South.

A fishing lake is located in this part of the park.

== Beckton District Park South ==
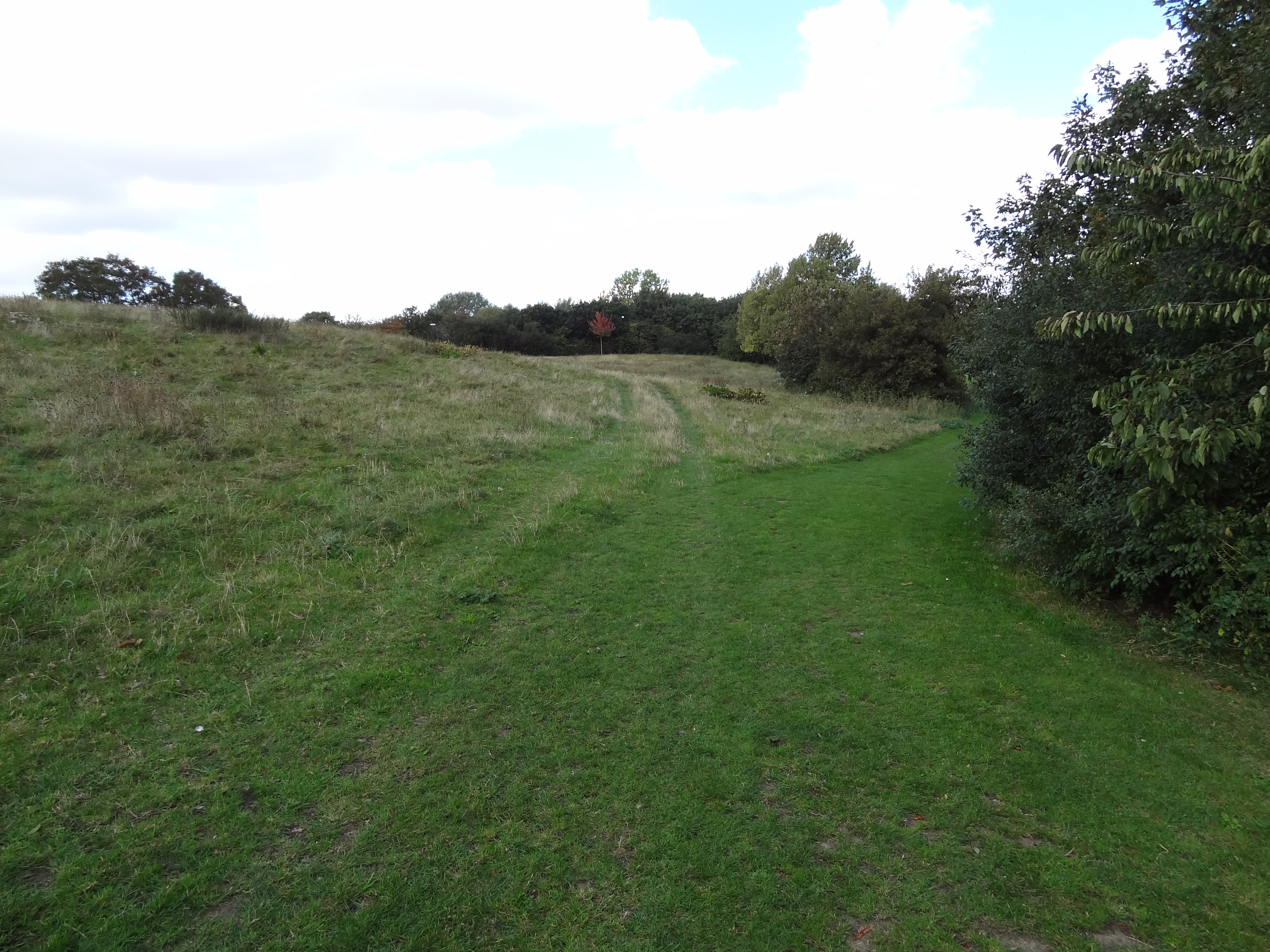
Beckton District Park South: Wildflower meadow

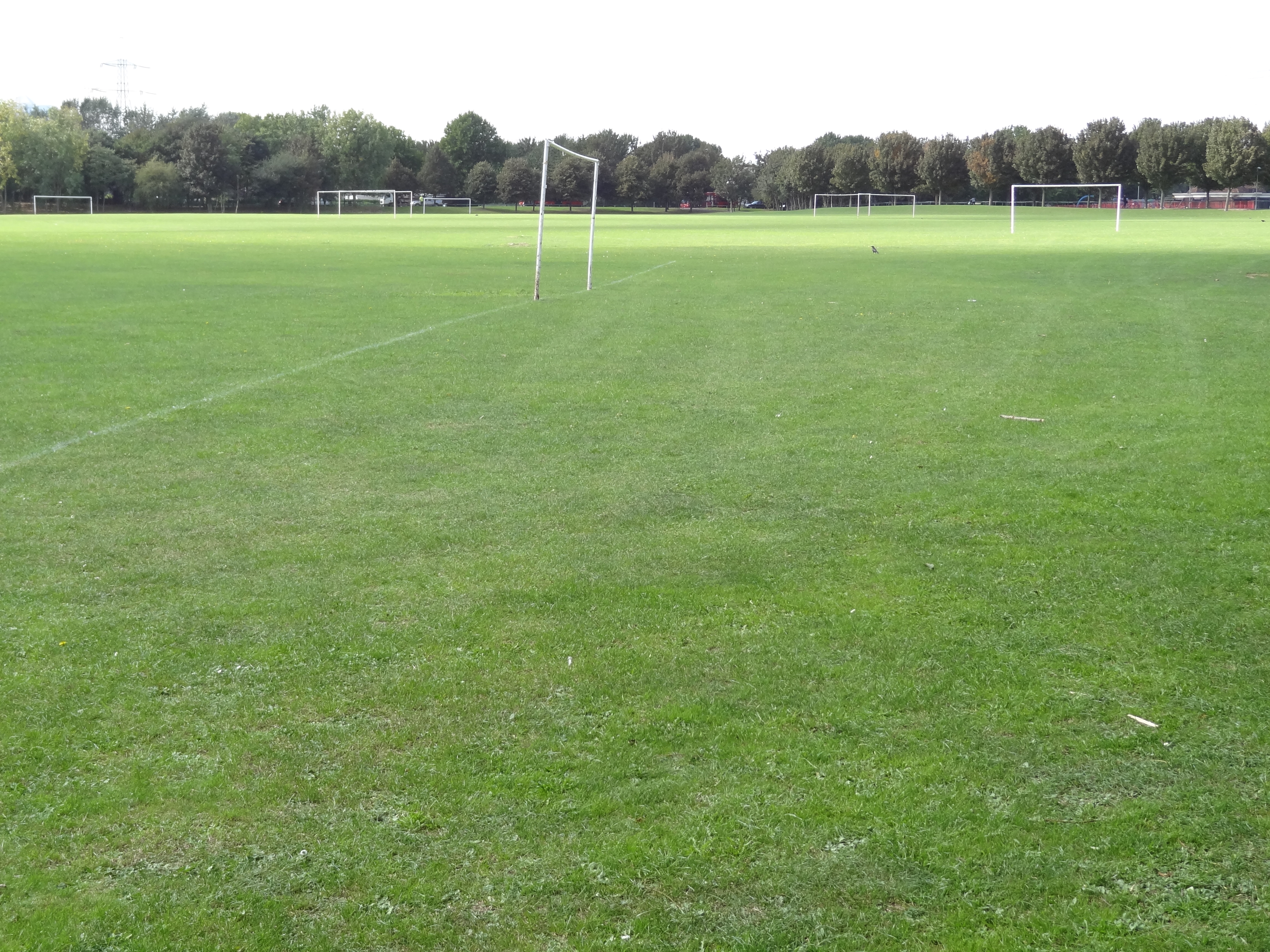
Beckton District Park South: Football pitches

The south-eastern part is a large grassed area with football pitches, a children's playground and a small pond. North-west is a hilly area managed for nature conservation with a wildflower meadow and woods.

There is access from Stansfeld Road, Harper Road, and Tollgate Road (which separates the park from Beckton District Park North) Also from Strait Road and from the walkway from Beckton DLR station.

== New Beckton Park ==
New Beckton Park is a neighbouring small park. It has a grassed area with sports pitches, a running track and outdoor exercise equipment. There is access from Savage Gardens.

== See also ==
- Newham parks and open spaces
