= Parks and open spaces in the London Borough of Merton =

The London Borough of Merton is an outer London borough in the south west of the conurbation. Merton's parks and open spaces range in size from Mitcham Common and a major part of Wimbledon Common to the smaller gardens, sports grounds and recreation grounds within its boundaries.

The major areas of public open space in the Borough are:

- Cannizaro Park, Wimbledon: 13.95 hectares (34.5 acres)
- Cannon Hill Common, Morden: 21.45 ha (53.0 acres),
- Crooked Billet
- Figges Marsh, Mitcham: 10.12 ha (25.0 acres)
- Joseph Hood Recreation Ground, Morden: 8.50 ha (21.0 acres)
- King George's Playing Field, Morden: 8.09 ha (20.0 acres)
- Mitcham Common: 182 ha (449.7 acres)
- Morden Park: 49.78 ha (123.0 acres)
- Morden Hall Park: 50.59 ha (125.0 acres), National Trust property
- Morden Recreation Ground: 10.40 ha (25.7 acres)
- Ravensbury Park, Mitcham: 9.11 ha (22.5 acres)
- Sir Joseph Hood Memorial Playing Field, Motspur Park: 12.75 ha (31.5 acres), includes nature conservation area
- Wandle Park 4.5 ha (11.1 acres)
- Wimbledon Common, 460 hectares (1,140 acres)
- Wimbledon Park: 26.22 ha (64.8 acres)
