= Railway Fields =

Nature reserve in Harringay, London, England

Coordinates: 51.576744°N 0.101419°W

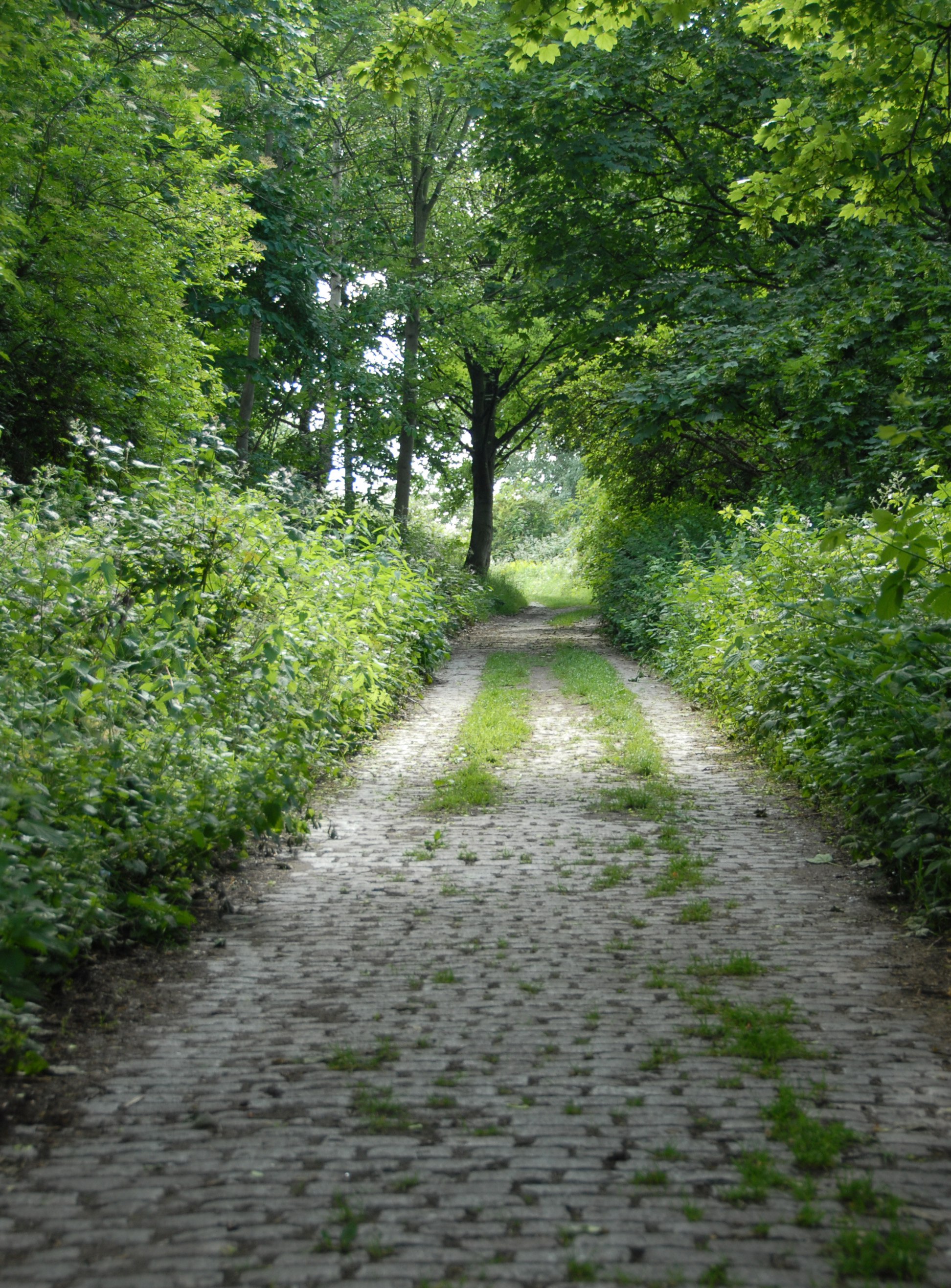
Railway Fields from the entrance

Railway Fields is a Local Nature Reserve and a Site of Borough Importance for Nature Conservation, Grade I, in Harringay the London Borough of Haringey. About one hectare in area, it was a railway goods yard until 1967.

The park also contains a pond which is most commonly the home of the Common frog and the Blue-tailed damselfly.

== Habitat, flora and fauna ==
Much of the site is wooded with open birch woodland running along part of the boundary with the railway. Denser woodland and scrub occupies much of the rest of the site. There are areas of grassland and a small pond. At the centre of the reserve, a wooden cabin provides an office and a classroom.

Over 200 species of wild flowers have been recorded. This includes the unique Haringey Knotweed (×Reyllopia conollyana) discovered in 1987, a cross between the Japanese knotweed and the Russian vine. More than sixty species of birds have been observed since Railway Fields opened.

== History ==
A group of children learning about wildlife at the pond

The area that is now the Railway Fields nature reserve was established as a goods yard on the Tottenham and Hampstead Junction Railway in 1868. It seems likely that the main use of the goods yard was for coal.

Just under 100 years later, in 1967, the yard was closed. In 1975 it was acquired by Haringey Council for a community centre for Haringey Social Services. In 1986 it was opened as a nature park and used as an educational nature reserve. In 1990 it was declared a statutory local nature reserve. The site is protected as public recreation space in perpetuity as a Fields in Trust Queen Elizabeth II field.
