= Parks and open spaces in the London Borough of Tower Hamlets =

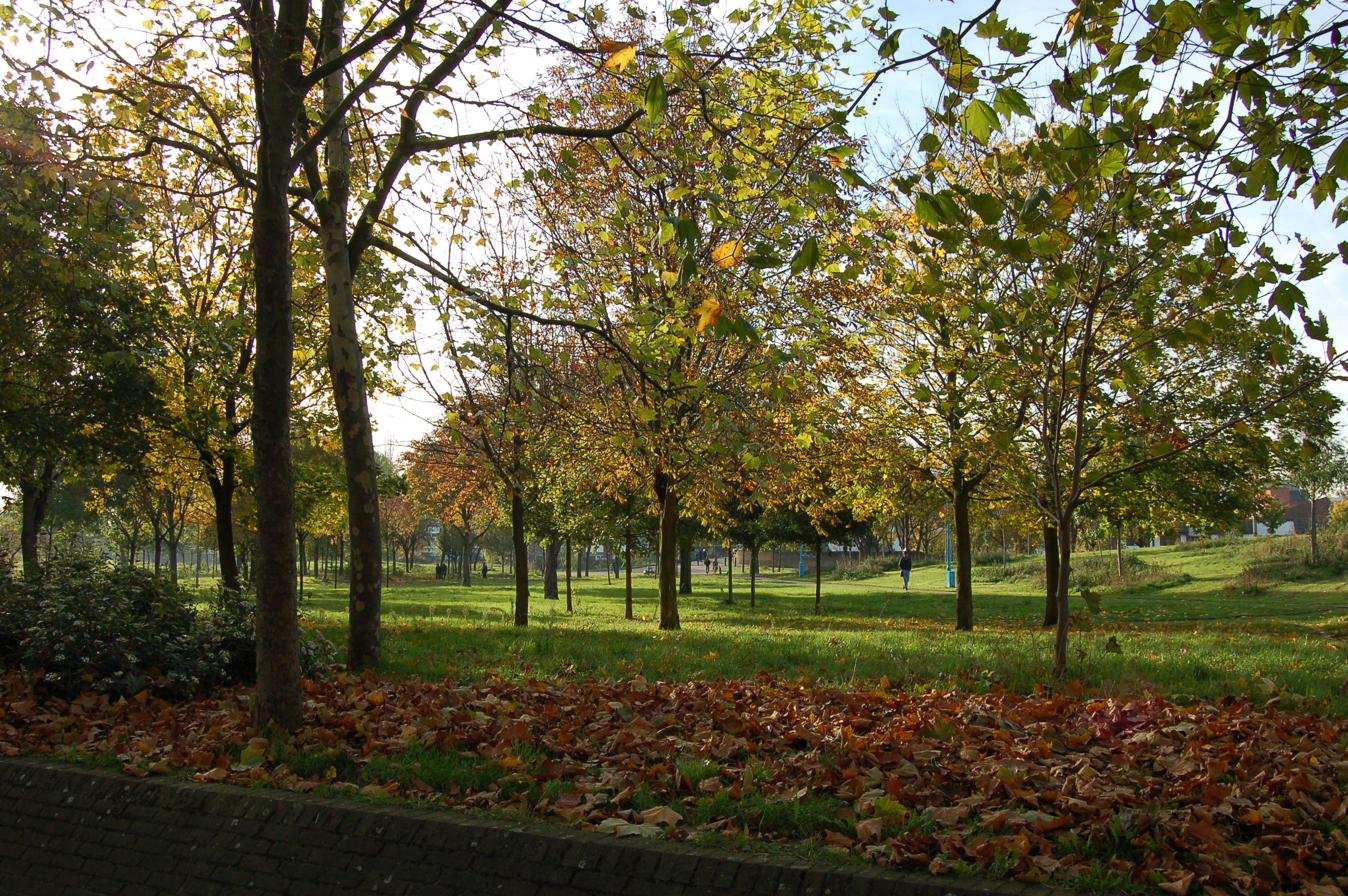
Mile End Park, south of the Mile End Road

The London Borough of Tower Hamlets, in spite of being close to the centre of London and perhaps retaining the idea of it being the docklands area, has over 100 areas of parks and open spaces within its boundaries. These range from the huge (Victoria Park) to small gardens and squares. In common with all the London boroughs, these green spaces provide "lungs" for the leisure pursuits of the inhabitants.

== Principal parks and open spaces ==
The principal parks in Tower Hamlets are:

- Victoria Park: 86.18 hectares (213.0 acres), created 1884
- Mile End Park: 32 hectares (79 acres), (stretches from Limehouse to Victoria Park along the Regent's Canal; international athletics stadium
- Mudchute Park: 13 hectares (32 acres), which includes the largest urban farm in Europe
- The Olympic Park is partly in the borough

Smaller parks within the borough include:

- Altab Ali Park, Whitechapel
- Bartlett Park in Poplar
- Grove Hall Park in Bow
- Island Gardens in Millwall: small 1.12 hectares (2.8 acres). Thames Riverside Park
- King Edward Memorial Park in Shadwell: 3.3 hectares (8.2 acres) in Shadwell
- Meath Gardens in Bethnal Green
- Sir John McDougall Gardens in Millwall
- Tower Hamlets Cemetery Park in Mile End and Ackroyd Drive Local Nature Reserve in Mile End

== Water ==
Tower Hamlets is a riverside borough, and one of the largest open spaces is the Thames itself. A sign posted riverside trail exists from Tower Bridge, in the west, around the Isle of Dogs, and leaving the borough at the crossing of the River Lee. Although planning procedures have tried to open and protect access to the river, often private developers have locked gates and otherwise prevented access to what should be public areas. There are otherwise, public stairs providing access to the foreshore.

- The River Lea forms the eastern boundary of the borough. The towpath is suitable for walking and cyclists. It can be readily accessed from Three Mills (near Bow) and provides access to Hackney Marshes and the Lee Valley Park.
- Limehouse Cut is a canal running through the borough from the River Thames at Limehouse Basin, joining the River Lee Navigation, at Bromley-by-Bow.
- The Regent's Canal enters Tower Hamlets from the London Borough of Hackney, and meets the Thames at Limehouse Basin.
- The Hertford Union Canal links the Regent's Canal to the River Lee Navigation at Old Ford Lock. It forms the southern boundary to Victoria Park.

== City farms ==
- Mudchute farm
- Stepney City Farm (Formerly Stepping Stones farm, established 1979)
