= Lordship Recreation Ground =

Public park in Tottenham, London

Coordinates: 51°35′39″N 0°05′15″W

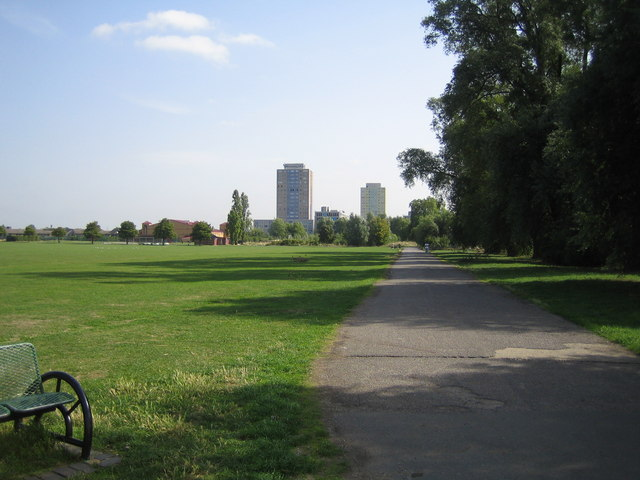
A path in the recreation ground, running parallel to the Moselle Brook. The Broadwater Farm Estate can be seen in the distance

Lordship Recreation Ground is a public park in Tottenham, London Borough of Haringey. It is over 20 hectares (49 acres) in size. Access is from Lordship Lane and from opposite Downhills Park in Downhills Park Road. It stretches approximately 750m north-south. The Moselle Brook runs through the park from west to east and the park also includes a small lake.

== Development ==
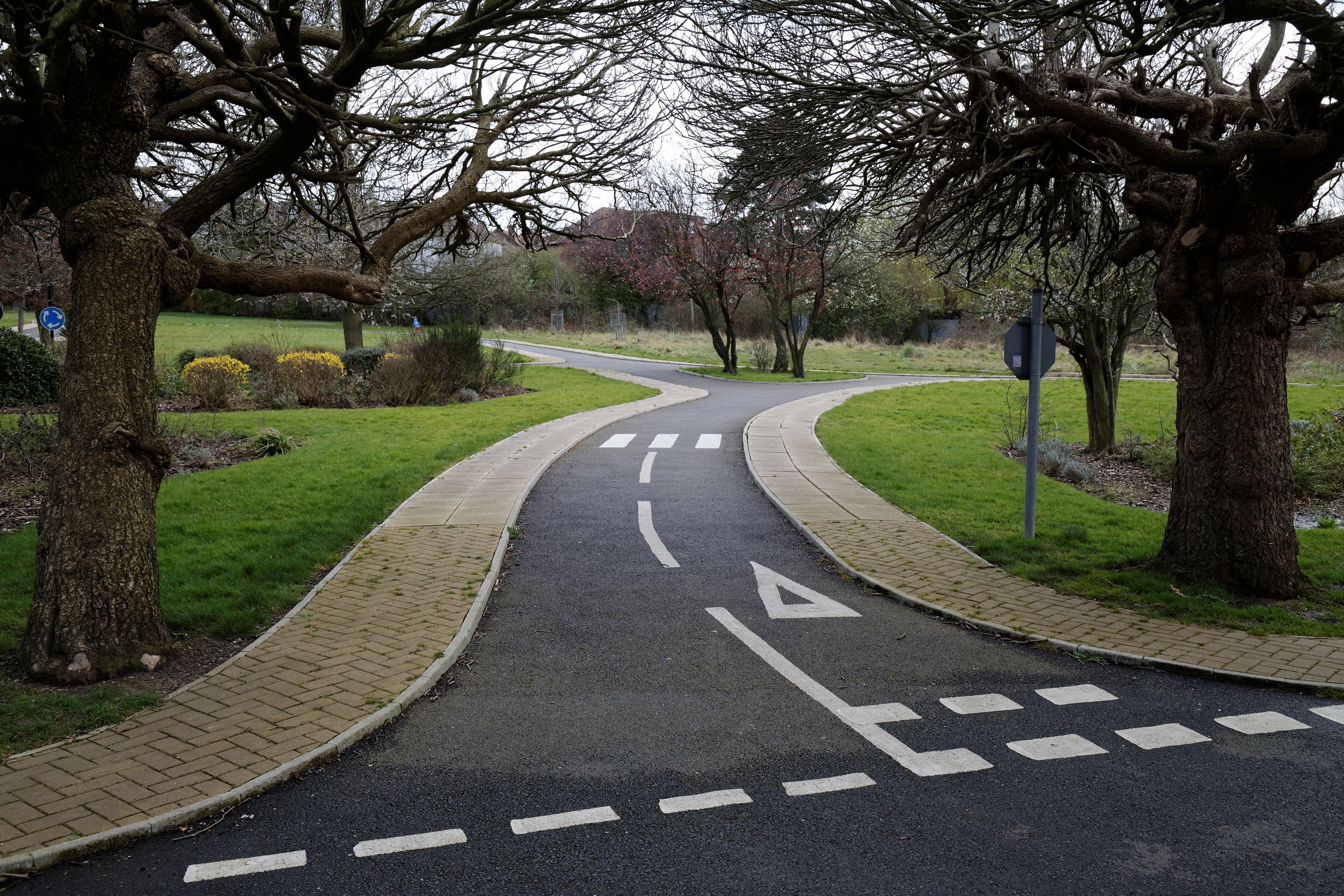
A section of the "Model Traffic Area"

The recreation ground opened in 1932, and includes a variety of recreational facilities, including tennis courts and a small theatre. In 1938, the Minister of Transport opened a 'Model Traffic Area', a scaled-down road network where children can use model cars or cycles. The Model Traffic Area was designed to teach children about road traffic in a safe environment.

In 2009, as a result of a public vote, the recreation ground received a £400,000 grant for major refurbishment.

== Recognition ==
In 2013 the park received a Green Flag Award, and won a gold prize in the London in Bloom awards. Lordship Recreation Ground is protected in perpetuity as a Fields in Trust Queen Elizabeth II Field.
