= Parks and open spaces in the London Borough of Newham =

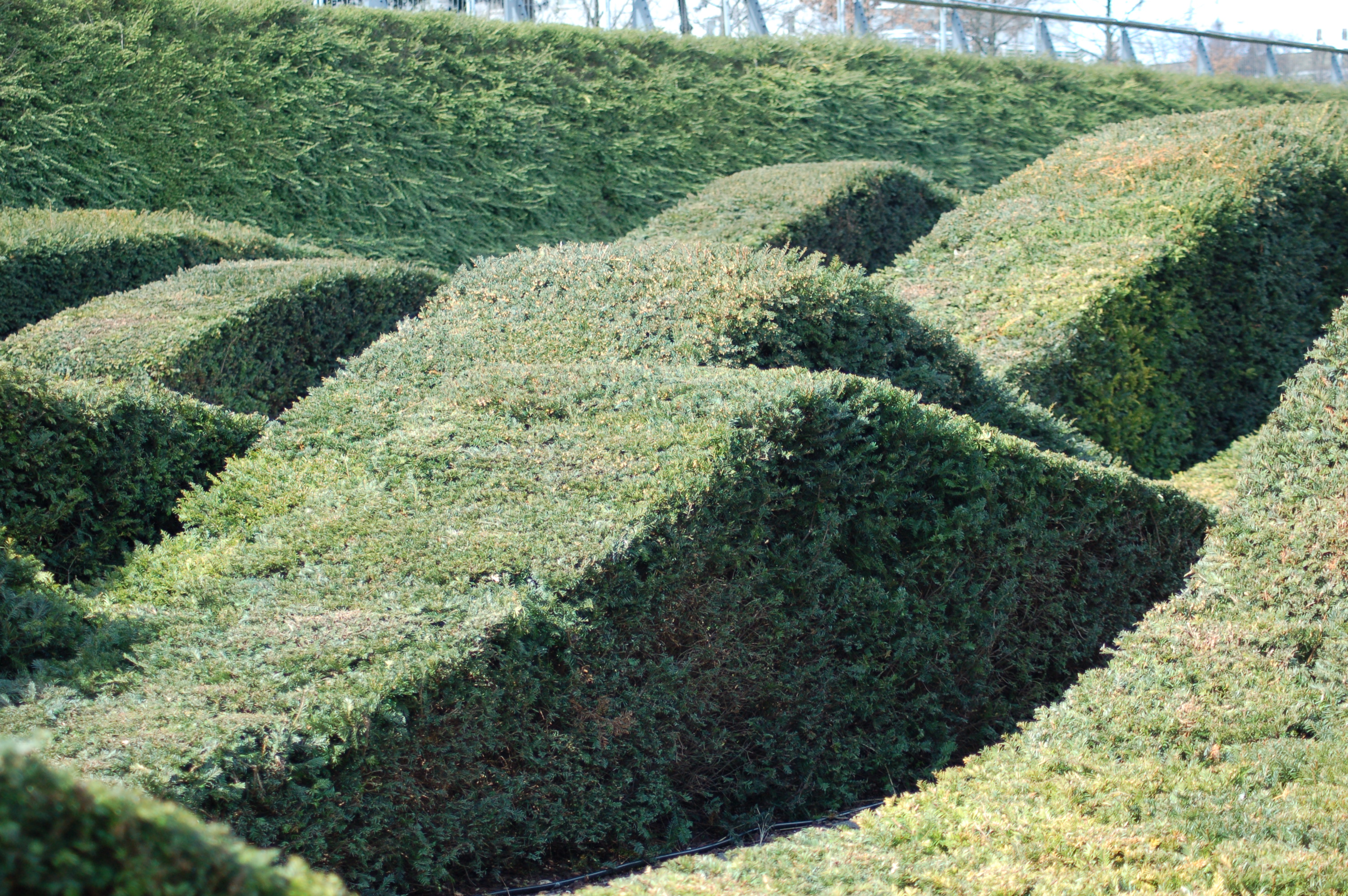
Thames Barrier Park (Mar 2007)

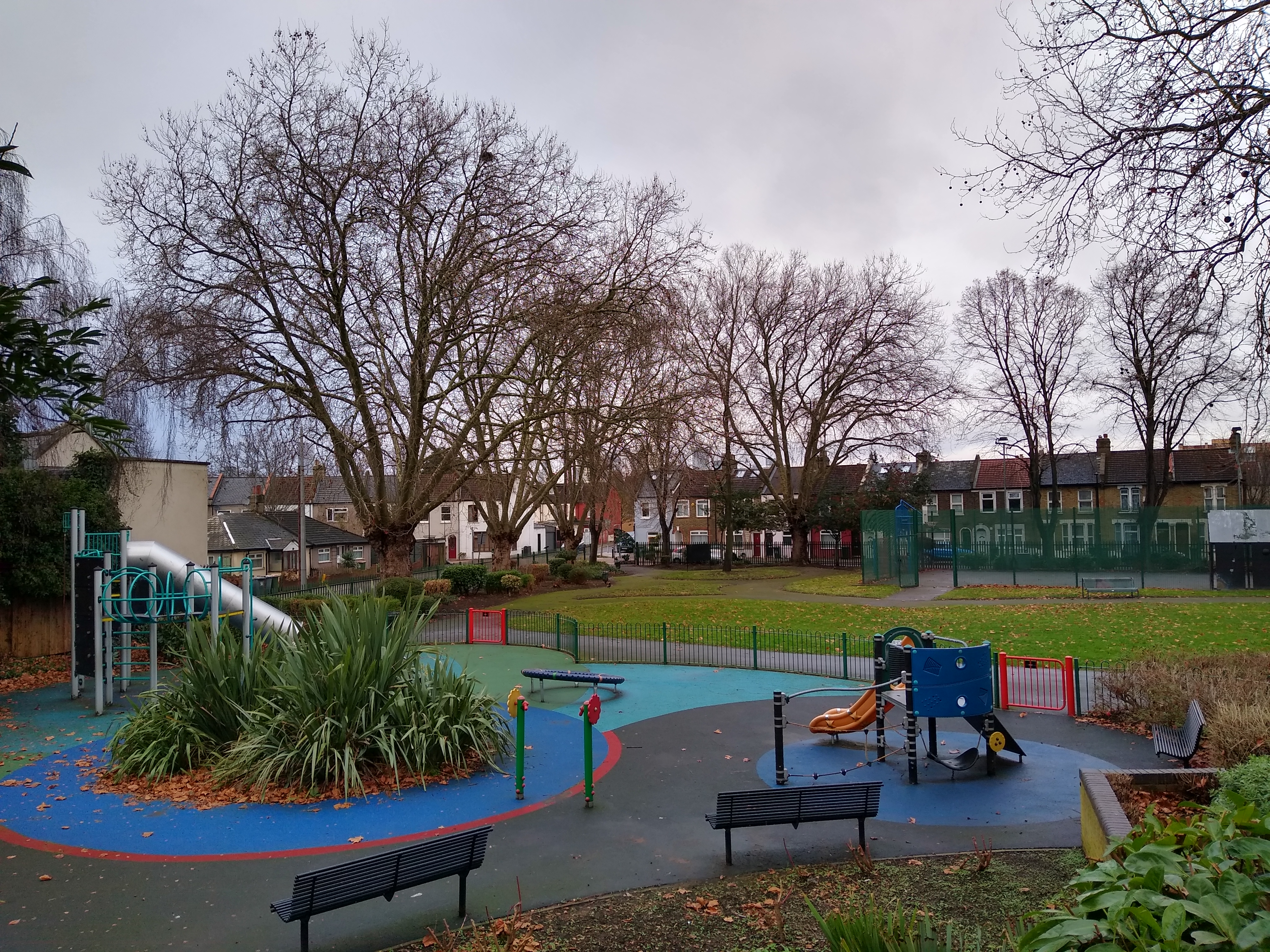
Lister Gardens (December 2021)

The London Borough of Newham, in spite of being one of the more crowded areas of London, has over 20 parks within its boundaries, as well as smaller recreation grounds. The larger parks in the Borough include:

- Beckton District Park North
- Beckton District Park South
- Central Park, East Ham
- East Ham Nature Reserve
- King George V Park, Custom House
- Memorial Recreation Ground, one-time home of West Ham United and its predecessor Thames Ironworks
- Stratford Park
- The Thames Barrier Park 2005 riverside park, developed following an international competition won by a team led by the acclaimed French landscape architect, Alain Provost, best known for his work at the Parc Citroen in Paris.
- West Ham Park
- Lister Gardens, Plaistow
- Plashet Park, Forest Gate

Newham is a riverside borough, and one of the largest open spaces is the Thames itself. A riverside path exists, but flood prevention works can often make river views problematic.

Other features:

- The Royal Docks comprise three docks—the Royal Albert Dock, the Royal Victoria Dock and the King George V Dock—built between 1880 and 1921 on riverside marshes. The three docks collectively formed the largest enclosed docks in the world with a water area of nearly 250 acres (1 km^{2}) and an overall estate of 1100 acres (4 km^{2}). The docks were constructed to provide berths for large vessels that could not be accommodated further upriver. The Royal Docks were finally closed for shipping in 1981.
- The River Lea forms the western boundary of the borough. The towpath is suitable for walking and cyclists. It can be readily accessed from Three Mills and provides access to Hackney Marshes and the Lee Valley Park.
- The Greenway is a shared footpath and cycleway running along the route of the Northern Outfall Sewer. It runs south-east from Wick Lane in Bow; through Stratford and Plaistow in Newham. The route crosses a number of roads, but is otherwise traffic free.
- The 200 acres (0.81 km^{2}) City of London Cemetery and Crematorium is in the north-east of the borough.

In 1998, the council set up a controversial new police force, the Newham Parks Constabulary, to police these parks. The force was renamed the Newham Community Constabulary and was subjected to an investigation into abuse of power and corruption, following considerable coverage in Private Eye. The force was disbanded in July 2009.

== See also ==
- Bow Creek Ecology Park
