= Downhills Park =

Park in London, England

Coordinates: 51°35′22″N 0°05′28″W

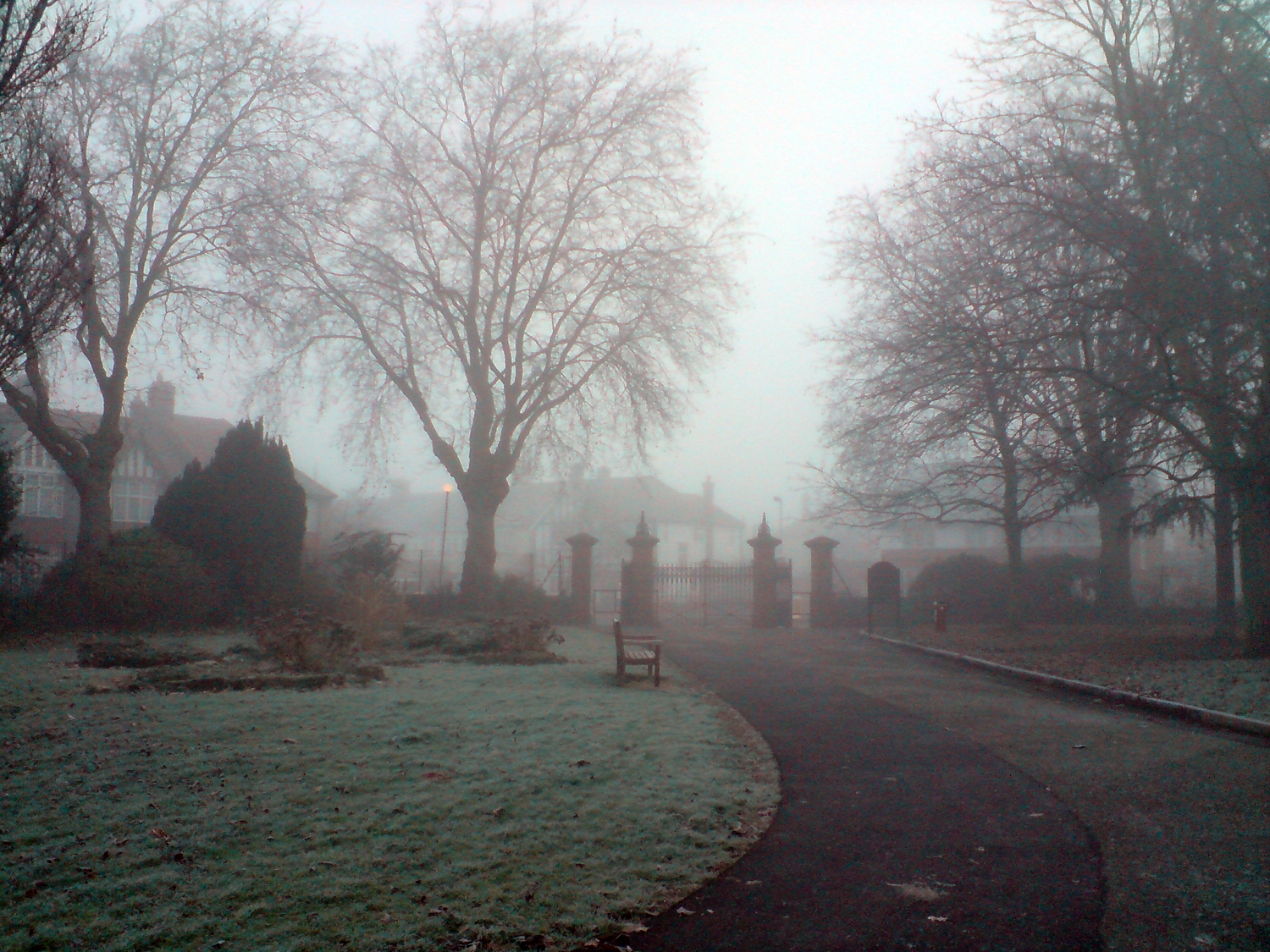
Downhills Park

Downhills Park is a park in the West Green area of Haringey just on the edge of Wood Green and Tottenham.

The park covers 12 hectares (30 acres); it includes an open recreation space and a managed garden area that includes a rose garden, tennis courts and basketball courts. It received the Green Flag Award in 2006.

Since July 2015, it has served as home of the Finsbury Park Rugby Football Club, Og GAA, and the Holloway Ladies Gaelic Football Team.

== History ==
Downhills was the name of a house built before 1728 that stood on the land. This land was bought in 1881 by British Land, but building development did not start till 1899. In response to a campaign by local residents, Tottenham Urban District Council bought the land, grounds and adjoining fields in 1901. The council preserved many features of the house grounds and also built several new amenities.

After 1939 many amenities were demolished or destroyed due to the World War bombings.. Haringey Council built new children's play facilities in the 1980s.
