= Ascalenia viviparella =

Scientific classification
- Domain: Eukaryota
- Kingdom: Animalia
- Phylum: Arthropoda
- Class: Insecta
- Order: Lepidoptera
- Family: Cosmopterigidae
- Genus: Ascalenia
- Species: A. viviparella

Binomial name
- Ascalenia viviparella Kasy, 1969

Species of moth

Ascalenia viviparella is a moth in the family Cosmopterigidae. It is found in Afghanistan, Iran, Ukraine and southern Russia.

The wingspan is 7.5-9.5 mm. Adults have been recorded from May to June in Afghanistan and Iran. There are two generations per year.

The larvae feed on Calligonum junceum, Calligonum setosum and Calligonum leucocladum. They can be found from late spring to the second half of summer.
