= Coleophora calligoni =

Scientific classification
- Kingdom: Animalia
- Phylum: Arthropoda
- Class: Insecta
- Order: Lepidoptera
- Family: Coleophoridae
- Genus: Coleophora
- Species: C. calligoni

Binomial name
- Coleophora calligoni Falkovitsh, 1973

Species of moth

Coleophora calligoni is a moth of the family Coleophoridae. It is found in southern Russia, Turkestan and Uzbekistan.

Adults are on wing from June to August.

The larvae feed on the fruits of Calligonum species, including Calligonum junceum and Calligonum microcarpum.
