= Calligonum bakuense =

Scientific classification
- Kingdom: Plantae
- Clade: Tracheophytes
- Clade: Angiosperms
- Clade: Eudicots
- Order: Caryophyllales
- Family: Polygonaceae
- Subfamily: Polygonoideae
- Genus: Calligonum
- Species: C. bakuense

Binomial name
- Calligonum bakuense Litv.

Species of flowering plant

Calligonum bakuense is a species of Calligonum shrub, endemic to Azerbaijan. It has pinkish flowers and grows on coastal sands along the Caspian shore, reaching 1.5 m in height. The habitat is limited to the Absheron Peninsula. The specific epithet bakuense is derived from Baku.

The species is listed in the 1989 Red Book of Azerbaijan and in the 1997 IUCN Red List of Threatened Plants.
