= Penstemon lyallii =

- Flowering on a rock face in Waterton Lakes National Park Alberta, Canada

Conservation status
- Apparently Secure (NatureServe)

Scientific classification
- Kingdom: Plantae
- Clade: Tracheophytes
- Clade: Angiosperms
- Clade: Eudicots
- Clade: Asterids
- Order: Lamiales
- Family: Plantaginaceae
- Genus: Penstemon
- Species: P. lyallii

Binomial name
- Penstemon lyallii (A.Gray) A.Gray

Synonyms
- Penstemon linearifolius

Plant species in the veronica family

Penstemon lyallii, also known as Lyall's penstemon, is a species from the Rocky Mountains of southern Canada and the northern United States.

== Description ==
Lyall's penstemon is a perennial plant with a woody taproot and a branching caudex at or just under the soil surface. It grows flowering stems that can be 30 to 80 centimeters (1–2.5 ft) tall at full size, but sometimes will be dwarfed to just 18 cm (7 in). They grow straight upwards or lean out from the plant's crown and are hairy. Lower down the hairs can be backwards pointing while higher up they can sometimes be glandular.

Unlike other penstemons in its range, it lacks basal leaves. Each stem will have 16 to 26 leaves attached in pairs to opposite sides of the stems below the flowers either by very short leaf stalks or directly by the base of the leaf. They are 2.3–13 centimeters (1–5 in) long and just 0.3–2 cm wide.

The flowers are lavender to purple.

== Taxonomy ==
When first described by Asa Gray in 1862, he placed it as a variety of Penstemon menziesii. He described it from specimens collected by David Lyall between Fort Colville and the Rocky Mountains. Even though he described it as a variety he marked this designation with a question mark and wrote of it, "A most remarkable form, if not a distinct species." Twenty-four years later in 1886, he raised it to a species in the Penstemon genus. Alongside the rest of the genus it is classified in the Plantaginaceae family. Although it has no accepted varieties, one was described in 1908 by Louis Krautter, reclassifying the 1893 publication of Penstemon linearifolius by John Merle Coulter and Elmon McLean Fisher that is also considered a synonym of Penstemon lyallii.

Table of Synonyms
Name	Year	Rank	Notes
Penstemon linearifolius J.M.Coult. & Fisher	1893	species	= het.
Penstemon lyallii var. linearifolius (J.M.Coult. & Fisher) Krautter	1908	variety	= het.
Penstemon menziesii var. lyallii A.Gray	1862	variety	≡ hom.
Notes: ≡ homotypic synonym; = heterotypic synonym

=== Names ===
The species name is a Botanical Latin form of David Lyall's surname. Lyall was the botanist on the Oreong Boundary Commission and collected specimens of the species. It is similarly known as Lyall's penstemon or Lyall's beardtongue.

== Range and habitat ==
Lyall's penstemon is endemic to a small area of the Rocky Mountains in southern Canada and the northern United States. In British Columbia it grows in the southeast and central parts of the province, in the drainage of the Flathead River, around Crowsnest Pass, around Elko, Fernie, near Alexis Creek, and as far north as Williams Lake. In Alberta it is only found in the southwest of the province.

South of the boarder in the US it is recorded in northeastern Washington, northern Idaho, and northwestern Montana. In Idaho it grows from Latah and Shoshone counties northward in the Idaho Panhandle. The Montana Field Guide reports it native to the northern edge of Beaverhead County and northwards to Canada, but the NRCS also reports it in the southwest in Gallatin County. In Glacier National Park it is common in higher locations along Going-to-the-Sun Road.

It grows on rocky slopes, from rock outcrops, and in the gravel bars along streams at elevations of 600–2,400 meters (2,000–7,900 ft). It can be found in the foothills of the mountains to the subalpine zone.

=== Conservation ===
The status of Lyall's penstemon has not been reviewed by NatureServe since 1988. They rated it as apparently secure at the global level (G4) and also in British Columbia (S4), but vulnerable in Montana and Alberta (S3). They did not rank it in either Idaho or Washington.

== See also ==
- List of Penstemon species
