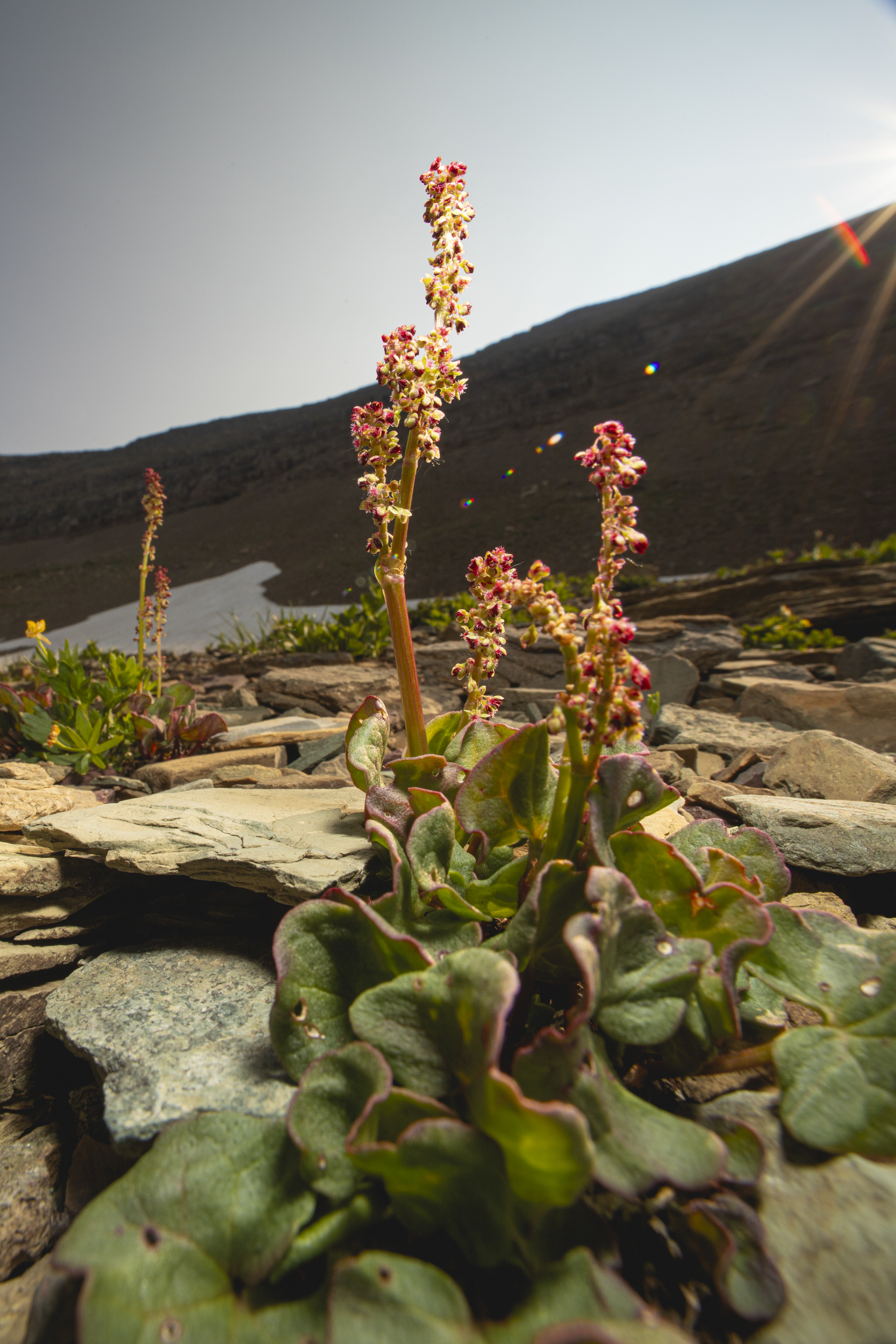
- In Glacier National Park

Conservation status
- Secure (NatureServe)

Scientific classification
- Kingdom: Plantae
- Clade: Tracheophytes
- Clade: Angiosperms
- Clade: Eudicots
- Order: Caryophyllales
- Family: Polygonaceae
- Genus: Oxyria
- Species: O. digyna

Binomial name
- Oxyria digyna (L.) Hill

Synonyms
- Acetosa digyna; Donia digyna; Lapathum digynum; Rheum digynum; Rumex digynus

= Oxyria digyna =

Plant species in the buckwheat family

Oxyria digyna (mountain sorrel, wood sorrel, Alpine sorrel or Alpine mountain-sorrel) is a species of flowering plant in the buckwheat family (Polygonaceae). It is native to arctic regions and mountainous parts of the Northern Hemisphere.

== Description ==
Mountain sorrel is a perennial plant with a tough taproot; the plant grows to a height of 10 to 30 cm (4 to 12 in). It grows in dense tufts, with stems that are usually unbranched and hairless. Both flowering stems and leaf stalks are somewhat reddish. The leaves are kidney-shaped, somewhat fleshy, on stalks from the basal part of the stem. Flowers are small, green and later reddish, and are grouped in an open upright cluster. The fruit is a small nut, encircled by a broad wing which finally turns red. Forming dense, red tufts, the plant is easily recognized. Oxyria digyna grows in wet places protected by snow in winter. Oxyria (from Greek) means "sour".

== Taxonomy ==
Carl Linnaeus gave this species the name Rumex digynus, placing it in the Rumex genus. The accepted name was created in 1768 when John Hill placed it in Oxyria naming it Oxyria digyna. With the other members of its genus it is classified in the Polygonaceae family. The species has no accepted subspecies, but there is one among its twelve synonyms.

Table of Synonyms
Name	Year	Rank	Notes
Acetosa digyna (L.) Mill.	1768	species	≡ hom.
Donia digyna (L.) R.Br.	1824	species	≡ hom.
Donia sapida R.Br.	1819	species	= het.
Lapathum digynum (L.) Lam.	1779	species	≡ hom.
Oxyria acida R.Br.	1829	species	= het.
Oxyria digyna subsp. elatior (R.Br. ex Meisn.) Juel, R.E.Fr. & Örtendahl	1911	subspecies	= het.
Oxyria elatior R.Br. ex Meisn.	1832	species	= het.
Oxyria reniformis Hook.	1821	species	= het.
Oxyria rotundifolia Gray	1821	species	= het.
Rheum digynum (L.) Wahlenb.	1812	species	≡ hom.
Rumex digynus L.	1753	species	≡ hom.
Rumex reniformis (Hook.) Regel	1862	species	= het.
Notes: ≡ homotypic synonym; = heterotypic synonym

== Distribution and habitat ==
Mountain sorrel is common in the tundra of the Arctic. Further south, it has a circumboreal distribution, growing in high mountainous areas in the Northern Hemisphere such as the Alps, the Sierra Nevada, and the Cascade Range. It typically grows in alpine meadows, scree, snow-bed sites and beside streams. On the coast of Norway, the pollen of this plant has been found in peat bogs that are 12,600 years old, indicating that it must have been one of the first plants to colonise the area after the retreating ice age glaciers.

Deer and elk favor the plant.

== Uses ==
The leaves of mountain sorrel have a sour or fresh acidic taste (due to oxalic acid) and are rich in vitamin C, containing about 36 mg/100 g. They can be eaten raw or cooked. They were used by the Inuit to prevent and cure scurvy. Mountain sorrel has also been an important plant in Saami diet. The plant is important for both insects and larger animals that feed on it in arctic and alpine regions where it occurs.

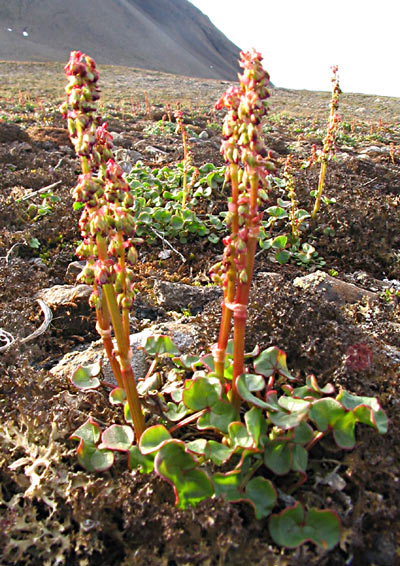
Svalbard

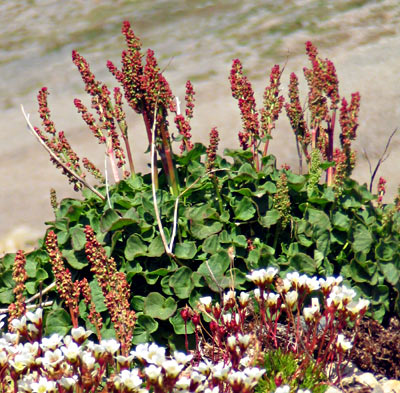
Svalbard

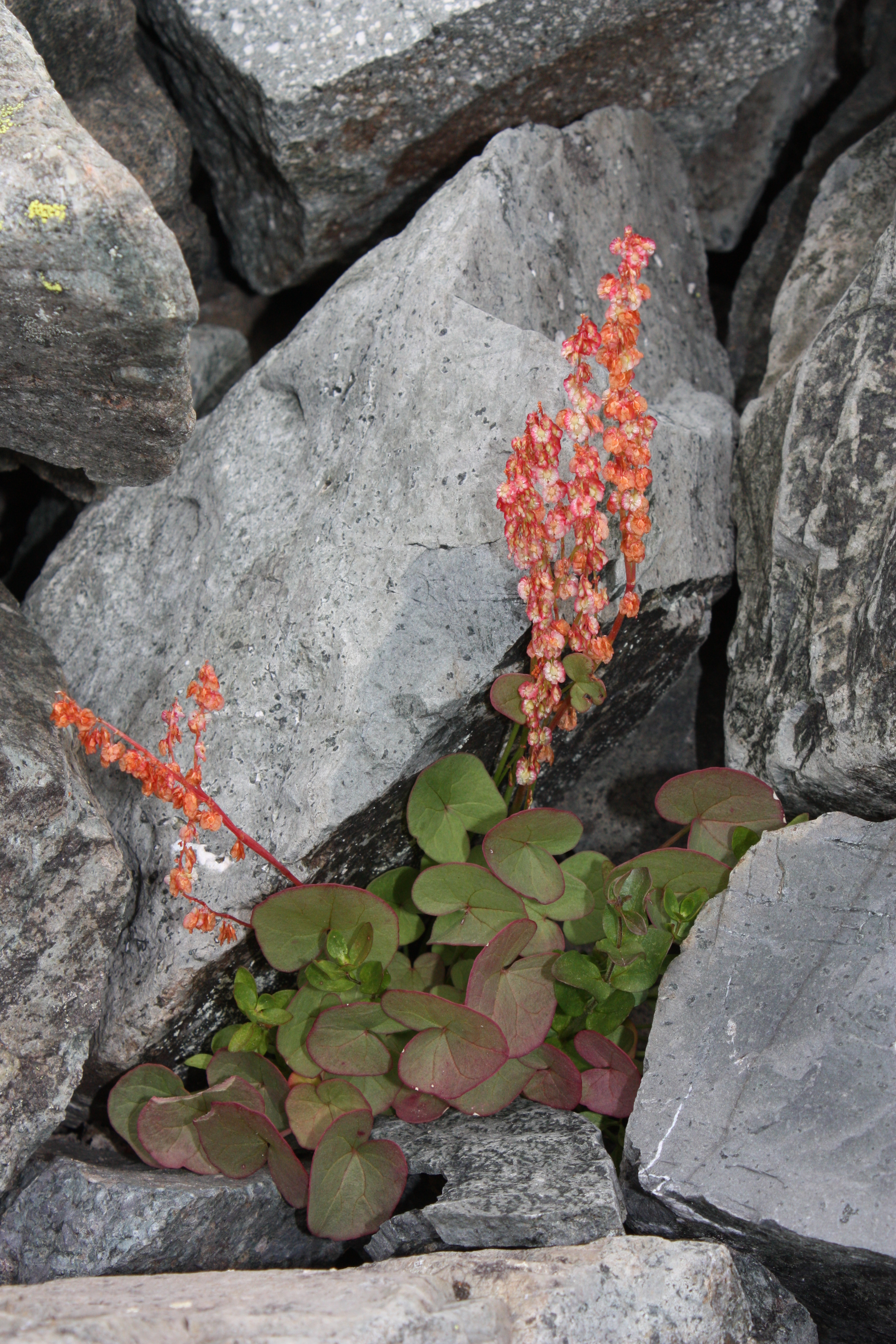
Mount Rainier National Park

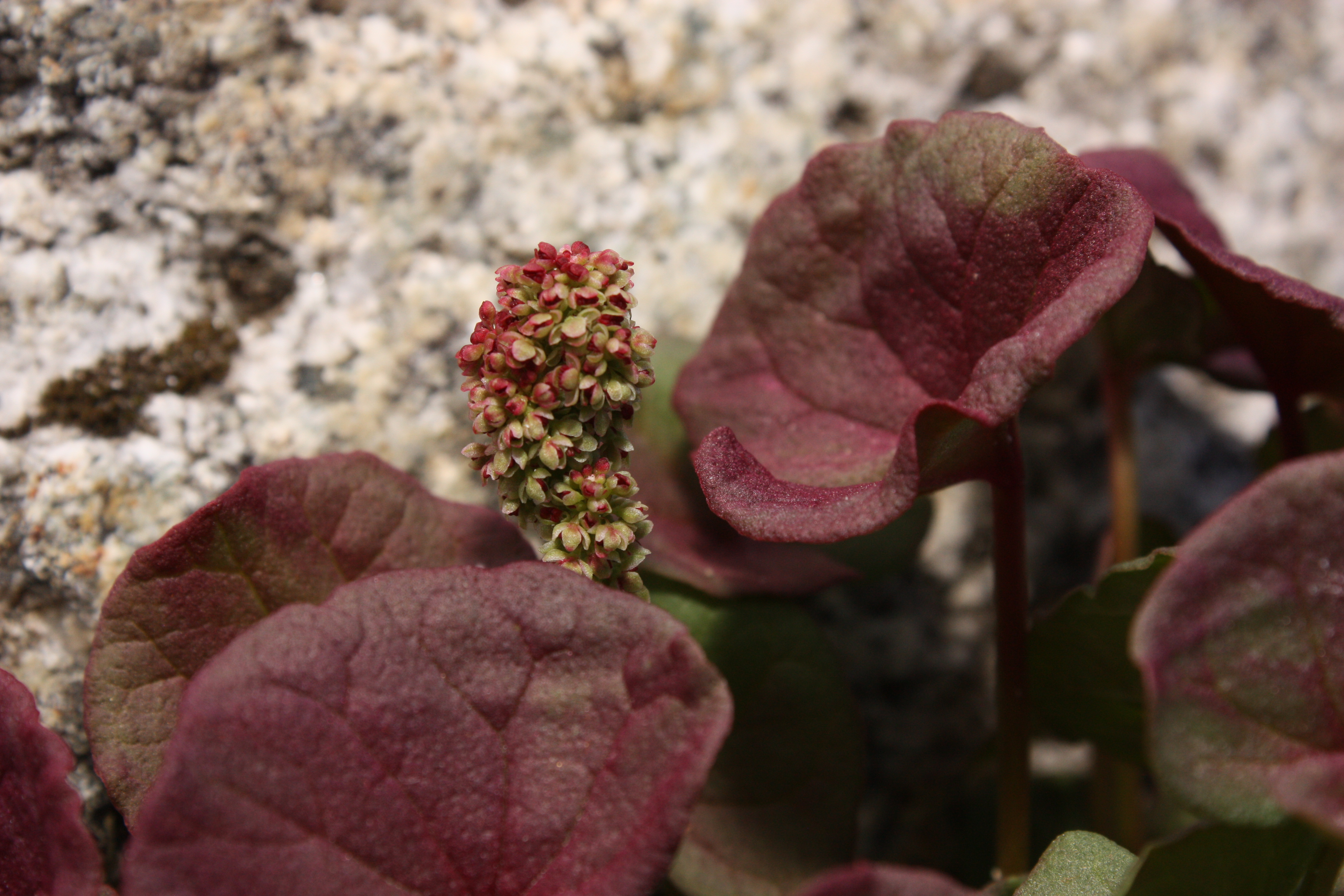
North Cascades National Park
