= Coleophora fuscinervella =

Scientific classification
- Kingdom: Animalia
- Phylum: Arthropoda
- Class: Insecta
- Order: Lepidoptera
- Family: Coleophoridae
- Genus: Coleophora
- Species: C. fuscinervella

Binomial name
- Coleophora fuscinervella Toll, 1956

Species of moth

Coleophora fuscinervella is a moth of the family Coleophoridae. It is found in Tunisia.

The larvae feed on Calligonum comosum. They feed on the generative organs of their host plant.
