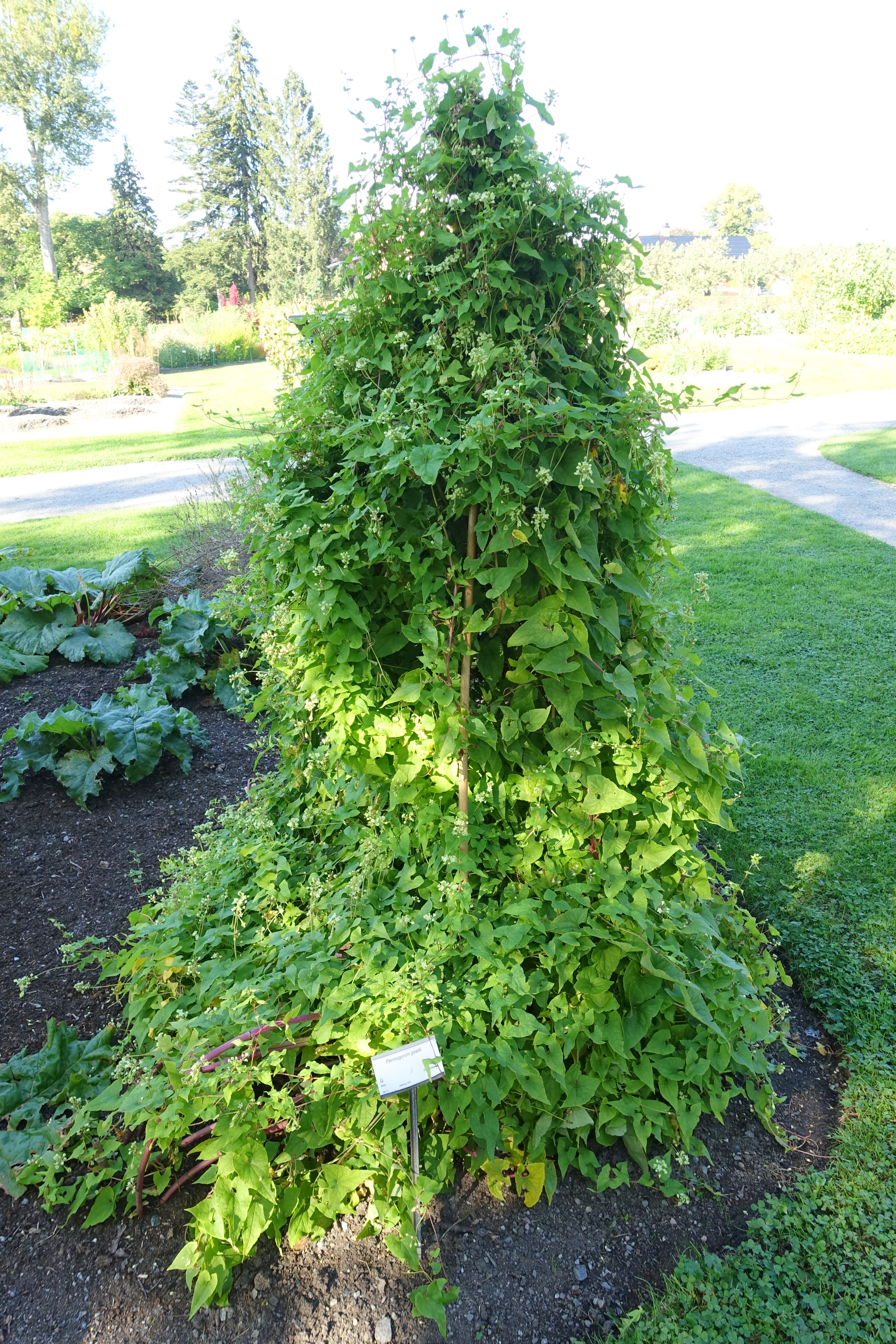

Scientific classification
- Kingdom: Plantae
- Clade: Tracheophytes
- Clade: Angiosperms
- Clade: Eudicots
- Order: Caryophyllales
- Family: Polygonaceae
- Subfamily: Polygonoideae
- Genus: Pteroxygonum
- Species: P. giraldii

Binomial name
- Pteroxygonum giraldii Dammer & Diels

Synonyms
- Fagopyrum giraldii (Dammer & Diels) Haraldson

= Pteroxygonum giraldii =

Species of flowering plant

Pteroxygonum giraldii is a species of flowering plant in the family Polygonaceae, endemic to the Chinese provinces of Gansu, Hebei, Henan, Hubei, Shaanxi, Shanxi, and Sichuan. It is found at altitudes of 600–2,000 m (2,000–6,600 ft). It grows to more than 3 m (10 ft) in height, with leaf blades triangular or triangular-ovate in shape, 4–7 cm (1.6–2.8 in) by 3–6 cm (1.2–2.4 in).
