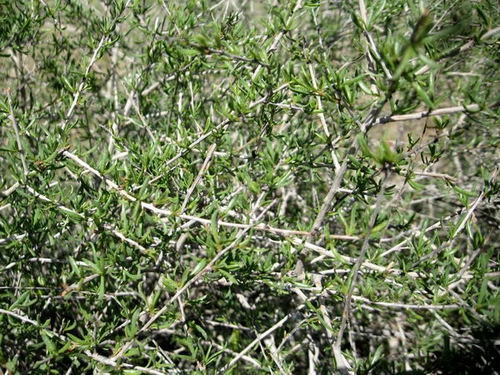
- Pteropyrum aucheri subsp. olivieri

Scientific classification
- Kingdom: Plantae
- Clade: Tracheophytes
- Clade: Angiosperms
- Clade: Eudicots
- Order: Caryophyllales
- Family: Polygonaceae
- Subfamily: Polygonoideae
- Genus: Pteropyrum; Jaub. & Spach

Species
- See text.

= Pteropyrum =

Genus of flowering plants

Pteropyrum is a genus of plants in the family Polygonaceae. Plants of the World Online accepts seven species, which range from Turkey to Afghanistan and Pakistan and to the Gulf States and Oman.

== Description ==
Species of Pteropyrum are shrubs. The few leaves may be arranged alternately or in bundles (fascicled). The ochrea is short. The flowers are small and bisexual, with five tepals, two outer and three inner, the three inner clasping the fruit when it forms. There are eight stamens. The ovary is three-angled with three styles. The fruit has three broad wings.

== Taxonomy ==
The genus was erected by Hippolyte François Jaubert and Édouard Spach in 1844. It is placed in the subfamily Polygonoideae, tribe Calligoneae, along with its sister genus Calligonum.

=== Species ===
As of October 2025, Plants of the World Online accepts seven species:

- Pteropyrum aucheri Jaub. & Spach (synonym Pteropyrum ericoides Boiss.)
- Pteropyrum gypsaceum Akhani & Doostm.
- Pteropyrum jakdanense Doostm.
- Pteropyrum macrocarpum Doostm. & Akhani
- Pteropyrum naufelum Al-Khayat
- Pteropyrum scoparium Jaub. & Spach
- Pteropyrum zagricum Doostm. & Akhani
