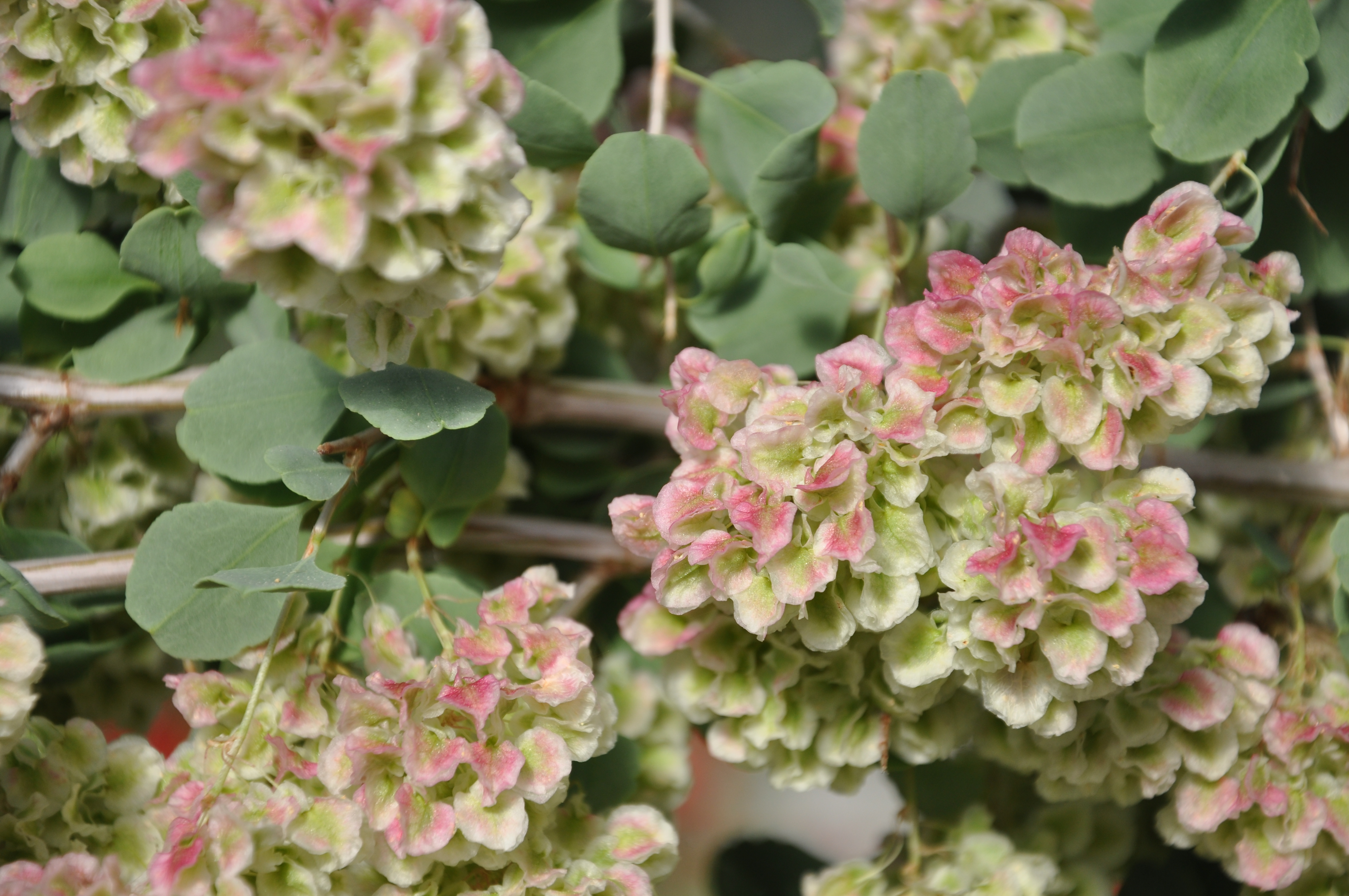
- Atraphaxis pyrifolia

Scientific classification
- Kingdom: Plantae
- Clade: Tracheophytes
- Clade: Angiosperms
- Clade: Eudicots
- Order: Caryophyllales
- Family: Polygonaceae
- Subfamily: Polygonoideae
- Genus: Atraphaxis; L.

Species
- See text

Synonyms
- Persicaria Neck.; Tragopyrum M.Bieb.

= Atraphaxis =

Genus of flowering plants

Atraphaxis is a genus of flowering plants in the family Polygonaceae with about 40 species.

== Description ==
Species of Atraphaxis are much branched woody plants, forming shrubs or shrubby tufts. The current year's branchlets are herbaceous and bear the leaves and flowers. The leaves are simple and alternate, with very short stalks (almost sessile). The ochreas are membranous and usually two-veined, more-or-less joined at the base. The inflorescence is made up of several bundles (fascicles) of one to three flowers. The flowers have persistent tepals, either arranged in a narrow tube with unequal lobes or bell-shaped with equal segments. The fruits are wingless achenes.

== Taxonomy ==
The genus Atraphaxis was erected by Carl Linnaeus in 1753. As with many other genera in the family Polygonaceae, the boundaries between the genera have been unclear, and some or all species placed in other genera. Molecular phylogenetic studies have shown that Atraphaxis forms a distinct clade. The genus is placed in the tribe Polygoneae of the subfamily Polygonoideae. Within the tribe, it is most closely related to the genera Duma and Polygonum, forming the so-called "DAP clade".

- Polygoneae
  - Knorringia
  - - - Polygonum ciliinode (syn. Fallopia ciliinodis)
      - DAP clade
        - Duma
        - - Atraphaxis
          - Polygonum
    - RMF clade
      - Reynoutria
      - - Muehlenbeckia
        - Fallopia s.s.

=== Species ===
As of March 2019, Plants of the World Online accepted 41 species:

- Atraphaxis angustifolia Jaub. & Spach
- Atraphaxis ariana (Grigorj.) T.M.Schust. & Reveal
- Atraphaxis arida (Boiss. & Hausskn.) S.Tavakkoli & Kaz.Osaloo
- Atraphaxis atraphaxiformis (Botsch.) T.M.Schust. & Reveal
- Atraphaxis aucheri Jaub. & Spach
- Atraphaxis avenia Botsch.
- Atraphaxis badghysi Kult.
- Atraphaxis billardierei Jaub. & Spach
- Atraphaxis binaludensis S.Tavakkoli, Mozaff. & Kaz.Osaloo
- Atraphaxis botuliformis (Mozaff.) S.Tavakkoli & Mozaff.
- Atraphaxis bracteata Losinsk.
- Atraphaxis canescens Bunge
- Atraphaxis caucasica (Hoffm.) Pavlov
- Atraphaxis compacta Ledeb.
- Atraphaxis daghestanica (Lovelius) Lovelius
- Atraphaxis decipiens Jaub. & Spach
- Atraphaxis dumosa (Boiss.) S.Tavakkoli & Kaz.Osaloo
- Atraphaxis frutescens (L.) K.Koch
- Atraphaxis grandiflora Willd.
- Atraphaxis intricata Mozaff.
- Atraphaxis irtyschensis Chang Y.Yang & Y.L.Han
- Atraphaxis kamelinii Yurtseva
- Atraphaxis karataviensis Pavlov & Lipsch.
- Atraphaxis kermanica S.Tavakkoli & Kaz.Osaloo
- Atraphaxis khajeh-jamali (Khosravi & Poormahdi) S.Tavakkoli & Kaz.Osaloo
- Atraphaxis kopetdagensis Kovalevsk.
- Atraphaxis laetevirens (Ledeb.) Jaub. & Spach
- Atraphaxis macrocarpa Rech.f. & Schiman-Czeika
- Atraphaxis manshurica Kitag.
- Atraphaxis muschketowii Krasn.
- Atraphaxis popovii (Borodina) Yurtseva
- Atraphaxis pungens (M.Bieb.) Jaub. & Spach
- Atraphaxis pyrifolia Bunge
- Atraphaxis radkanensis S.Tavakkoli, Kaz.Osaloo & Mozaff.
- Atraphaxis rodinii Botsch.
- Atraphaxis salicornioides (Jaub. & Spach) S.Tavakkoli & Kaz.Osaloo
- Atraphaxis seravschanica Pavlov
- Atraphaxis spinosa L.
- Atraphaxis suaedifolia Jaub. & Spach
- Atraphaxis teretifolia (Popov) Kom.
- Atraphaxis toktogulica (Lazkov) T.M.Schust. & Reveal
