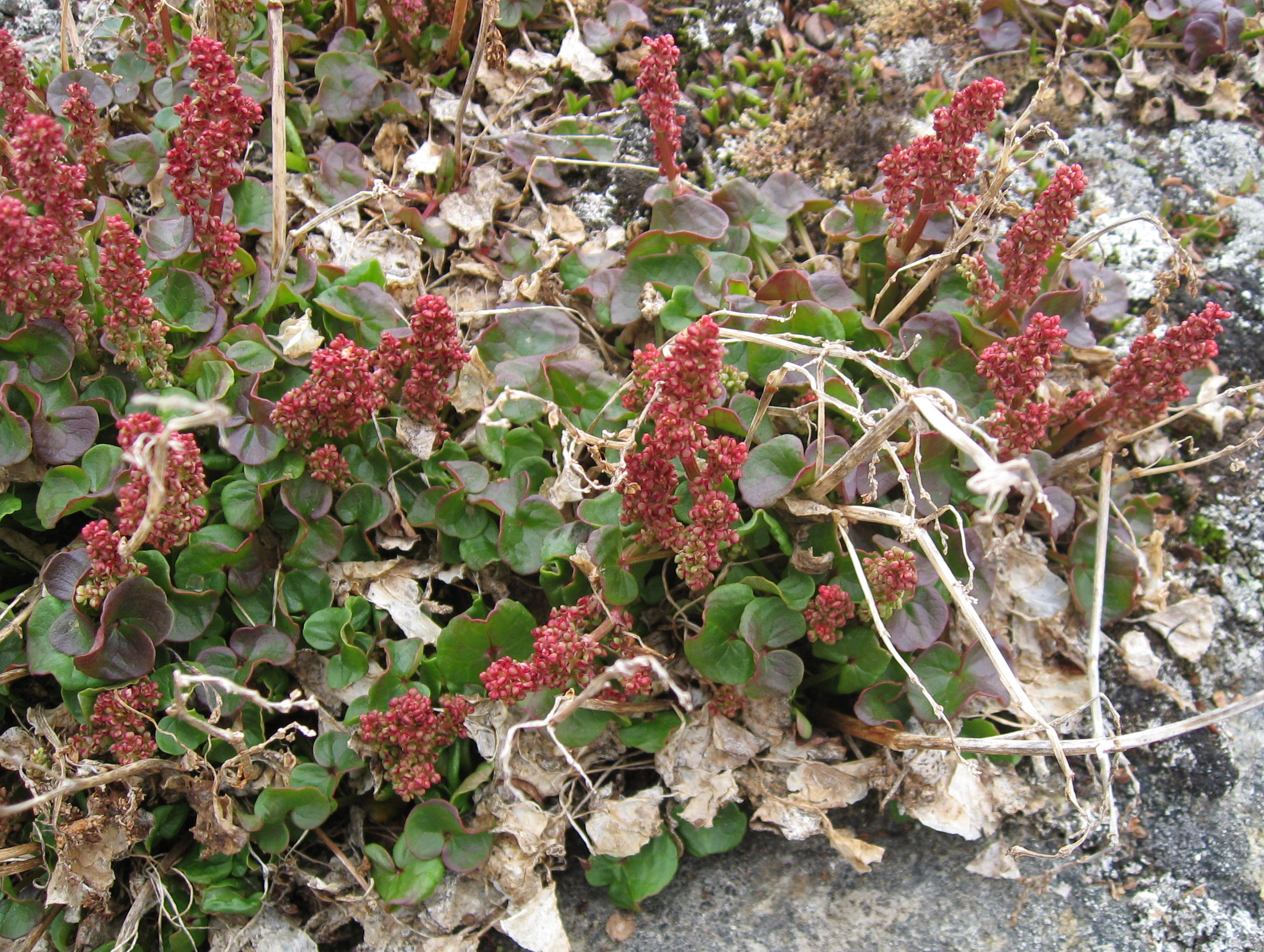
- Oxyria digyna near Upernavik, Greenland.

Scientific classification
- Kingdom: Plantae
- Clade: Tracheophytes
- Clade: Angiosperms
- Clade: Eudicots
- Order: Caryophyllales
- Family: Polygonaceae
- Subfamily: Polygonoideae
- Genus: Oxyria; Hill

Species
- See text.

Synonyms
- Donia R.Br.

= Oxyria =

Genus of flowering plants

Oxyria is a genus of flowering plants in the family Polygonaceae with three accepted species. It has a circumboreal distribution in the northern hemisphere.

== Description ==
Species of Oxyria are perennial herbaceous plants or weakly shrubby. They may have rhizomes. Their stems are erect, variably branched. Undivided leaves are present both at the base of the plant and on the stems. They are arranged alternately and have stalks (petioles). The ocrea is tubular and membranous. The inflorescences are terminal, paniclelike or racemelike, borne on stems (pedunculate). Individual flowers are either bisexual or unisexual, with four greenish to reddish brown tepals. The fruits are in the form of achenes with broadly winged margins.

== Taxonomy ==
The genus was first described by John Hill in 1765. It is placed in the subfamily Polygonoideae, tribe Rumiceae, along with Rheum and Rumex. It is sister to the clade formed by the other two genera.

- Rumiceae
  - Oxyria
  - - Rumex
    - Rheum

=== Species ===
As of March 2019, Plants of the World Online accepted the following species:

- Oxyria caucasica Chrtek & Šourková
- Oxyria digyna (L.) Hill
- Oxyria sinensis Hemsl.
