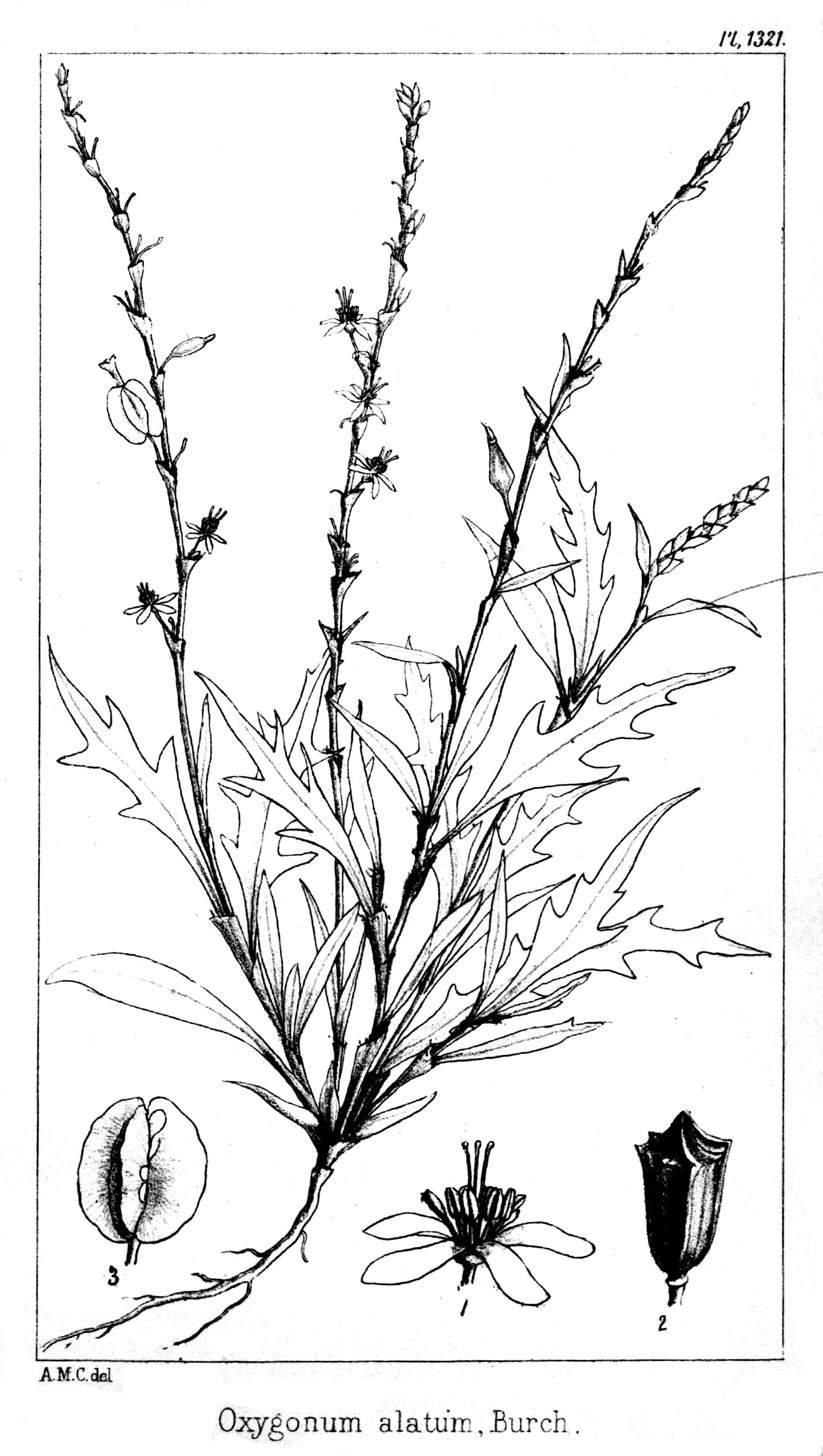
- Illustration of Oxygonum alatum from Hooker's Icones Plantarum, volume 14

Scientific classification
- Kingdom: Plantae
- Clade: Tracheophytes
- Clade: Angiosperms
- Clade: Eudicots
- Order: Caryophyllales
- Family: Polygonaceae
- Subfamily: Polygonoideae
- Genus: Oxygonum; Burch. ex Campd.

Species
- See text

Synonyms
- Ceratogonon Meisn.; Diplopyramis Welw.

= Oxygonum =

Genus of flowering plants

Oxygonum is a genus of plants in the family Polygonaceae with about 38 species. It is native to eastern parts of Africa and to the Arabian Peninsula.

== Description ==
Species of Oxygonum are annual or perennial herbaceous plants, more rarely shrubs or shrubby. Their leaves are variable between and within species. The inflorescences are long narrow racemes with bundles (fascicles) of flowers, usually one to five, but sometimes up to 15. The flowers are polygamous (i.e. there are male, female and bisexual flowers on the same plant). There are usually five tepals, arranged spirally, fused at the base to form a tube, longer in female flowers than in male ones. The eight stamens are joined at the base, with patches of nectar-bearing tissue at the base of the inner whorl. The fruit is in the form of an achene, usually three-angled, often with rows of spinelike structures.

== Taxonomy ==
The genus Oxygonum was first published in 1819 by Francisco Campderá, who attributed the name to William John Burchell. Oxygonum is placed in the tribe Oxygoneae of the subfamily Polygonoideae; it is the only genus in the tribe. A 2015 molecular phylogenetic study suggested that it was the sister of all the remaining tribes.

- Polygonoideae
  - Oxygoneae (Oxygonum)
  - - Persicarieae
    - - Fagopyreae
      - - Pteroxygoneae
        - - Calligoneae
          - - Rumiceae
            - Polygoneae

=== Species ===
As of October 2025, Plants of the World Online accepted the following species:

- Oxygonum acetosella Welw.
- Oxygonum alatum Burch.
- Oxygonum altissimum Germish.
- Oxygonum annuum S.Ortiz & Paiva
- Oxygonum atriplicifolium (Meisn.) Martelli
- Oxygonum auriculatum R.A.Graham
- Oxygonum buchananii (Dammer) J.B.Gillett
- Oxygonum carnosum R.A.Graham
- Oxygonum delagoense Kuntze
- Oxygonum dregeanum Meisn.
- Oxygonum ellipticum R.A.Graham
- Oxygonum fruticosum Dammer ex Milne-Redh.
- Oxygonum gramineum R.A.Graham
- Oxygonum hastatum S.Ortiz
- Oxygonum hirtum Peter
- Oxygonum leptopus Mildbr.
- Oxygonum limbatum R.A.Graham
- Oxygonum lineare De Wild.
- Oxygonum litorale R.A.Graham
- Oxygonum lobatum R.A.Graham
- Oxygonum maculatum R.A.Graham
- Oxygonum magdalenae Dammer ex Peter
- Oxygonum ovalifolium Robyns & E.Petit
- Oxygonum overlaetii Robyns
- Oxygonum pachybasis Milne-Redh.
- Oxygonum pterocarpum Osborne & Vollesen
- Oxygonum quarrei De Wild.
- Oxygonum robustum Germish.
- Oxygonum sagittatum R.A.Graham
- Oxygonum salicifolium Dammer
- Oxygonum schliebenii Mildbr.
- Oxygonum sinuatum (Hochst. & Steud. ex Meisn.) Dammer
- Oxygonum stuhlmannii Dammer
- Oxygonum subfastigiatum R.A.Graham
- Oxygonum tenerum Milne-Redh.
- Oxygonum thulinianum S.Ortiz
- Oxygonum tristachyum (Baker) H.Perrier
- Oxygonum wittei Staner
