= Knorringia sibirica =

Scientific classification
- Kingdom: Plantae
- Clade: Tracheophytes
- Clade: Angiosperms
- Clade: Eudicots
- Order: Caryophyllales
- Family: Polygonaceae
- Genus: Knorringia
- Species: K. sibirica

Binomial name
- Knorringia sibirica (Laxm.) Tzvelev

Synonyms
- Aconogonon sibiricum (Laxm.) H.Hara; Persicaria sibirica (Laxm.) H.Gross; Pleuropteropyrum sibiricum (Laxm.) Kitag.; Polygonum arcticum Pall. ex Spreng.; Polygonum sibiricum Laxm.

Species of flowering plant

Knorringia sibirica is a species of flowering plant in the family Polygonaceae, native to Siberia to Korea. It was first described, as Polygonum sibiricum by Erik Laxmann in 1773, and transferred to Knorringia by Nikolai Tzvelev in 1987.
