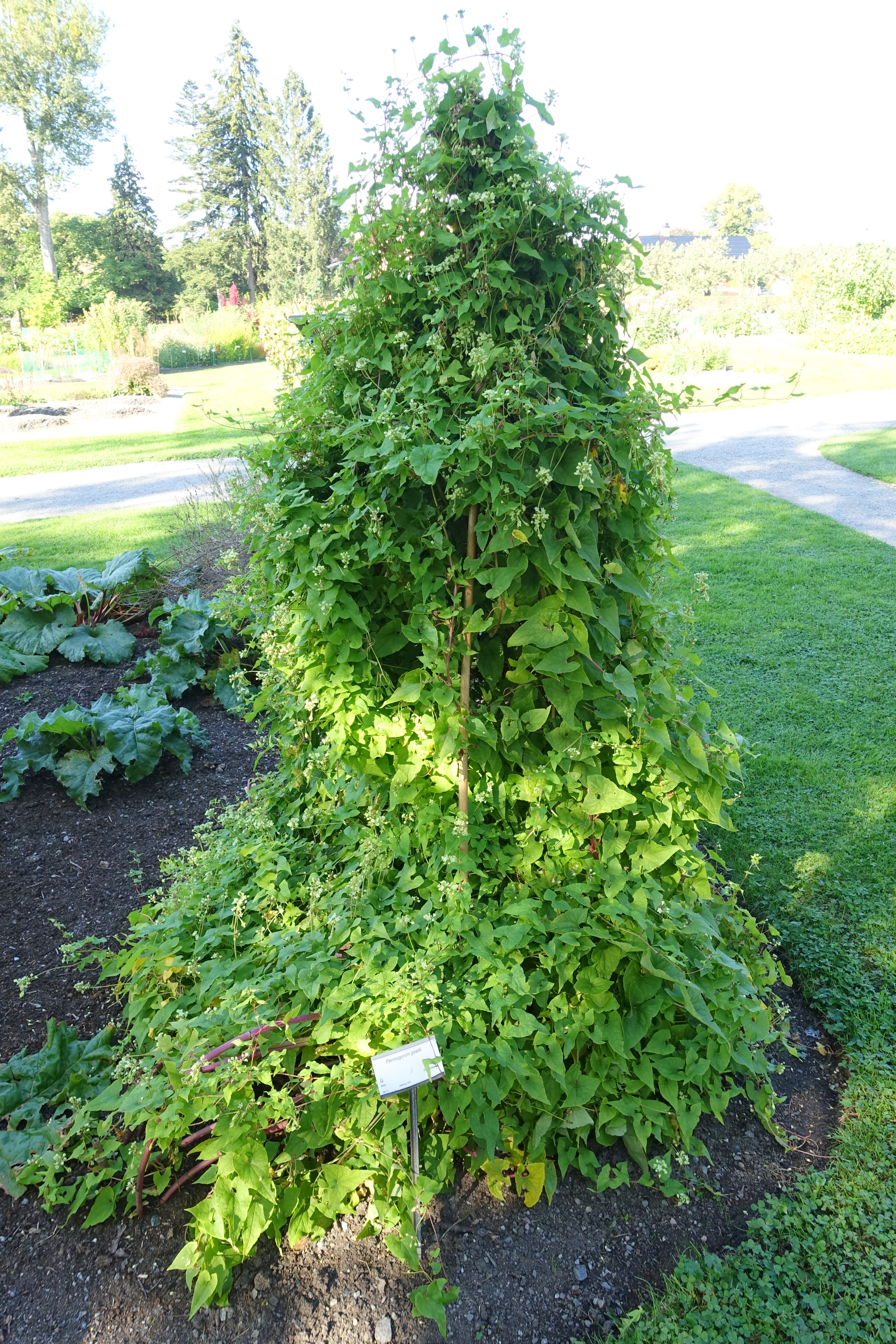
- Pteroxygonum giraldii

Scientific classification
- Kingdom: Plantae
- Clade: Tracheophytes
- Clade: Angiosperms
- Clade: Eudicots
- Order: Caryophyllales
- Family: Polygonaceae
- Subfamily: Polygonoideae
- Genus: Pteroxygonum; Dammer & Diels

= Pteroxygonum =

Genus of plants

Pteroxygonum is a plant genus in the family Polygonaceae. As of March 2019, two species are recognized. Their native range is from Tibet to southeast China.

== Description ==
Species of Pteroxygonum are twining vines growing from a large woody globe-shaped tuber. Their leaves are broad and palmate, with a dark red mark around each primary leaf vein. The inflorescence is in the form of an axillary raceme. The flowers are bisexual, with five spirally arranged tepals, eight stamens joined at the base, and three styles, also joined up to about the middle. Nectar is produced from tissue at the base of the stamens. Their fruits are in the form of winged, three-angled achenes.

== Taxonomy ==
The genus Pteroxygonum was erected in 1905 by Carl Dammer and F. Ludwig Diels for the species Pteroxygonum giraldii. They separated Pteroxygonum from Polygonum on the basis of the "very notably different structure of the fruit". Until 2015, the genus was considered to contain only this species. A 2015 molecular phylogenetic study found that the species formerly called Polygonum denticulatum was closely related to Pteroxygonum giraldii, and accordingly moved it to Pteroxygonum.

Pteroxygonum is placed in the subfamily Polygonoideae, tribe Pteroxygoneae. Some species assigned to the genus Fallopia were placed alongside Pteroxygonum in the cladogram resulting from the 2015 study, and may belong to a new genus.

- Polygonoideae
  - Oxygoneae
  - - Persicarieae
    - - Fagopyreae
      - - Pteroxygoneae (Pteroxygonum + some Fallopia)
        - - Calligoneae
          - - Rumiceae
            - Polygoneae

== Species ==
As of March 2019, Plants of the World Online accepted two species:

- Pteroxygonum denticulatum (C.C.Huang) T.M.Schust. & Reveal
- Pteroxygonum giraldii Dammer & Diels

== Bibliography ==
- "Reappraisal of the generic status of Pteroxygonum (Polygonaceae) on the basis of morphology, anatomy and nrDNA ITS sequence analysis", Wei SUN et al., Journal of Systematics and Evolution 46 (1): 73–79 (2008).
- eFloras description
