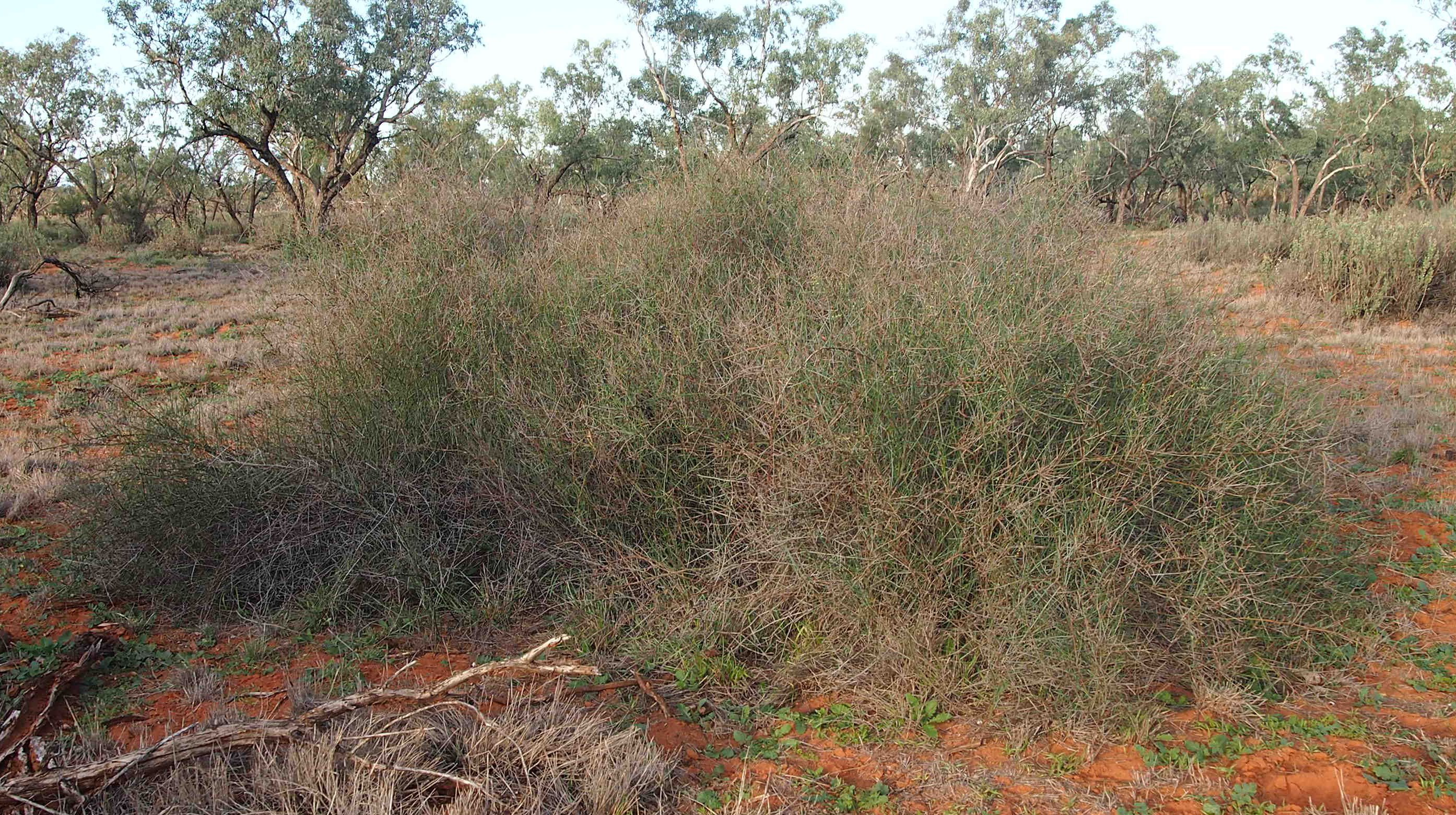
- Duma florulenta

Scientific classification
- Kingdom: Plantae
- Clade: Tracheophytes
- Clade: Angiosperms
- Clade: Eudicots
- Order: Caryophyllales
- Family: Polygonaceae
- Subfamily: Polygonoideae
- Genus: Duma; T.M.Schust.

= Duma (plant) =

Genus of flowering plants

Duma is a genus of shrubby flowering plants in the family Polygonaceae, subfamily Polygonoideae. The genus was separated from Muehlenbeckia in 2011. The native range of the genus is Australia.

== Description ==
Species of Duma are shrubs, with many flexible branches, whose tips are thornlike. They have white to greyish bark. The leaves are longer than wide, with a very small curved spine at the tip. The flowers are without stalks (petioles). Plants are dioecious. Staminate flowers have eight stamens and a rudimentary or missing pistil; pistillate flowers have staminodes. The fruit is in the form of an ovoid or three-angled achene, which is smooth and shiny.

== Taxonomy ==
The genus Duma was created by Tanja Schuster in 2011 for some species previously placed in Muehlenbeckia, but which were shown by molecular phylogenetic studies to form a distinct clade. The name is derived from the Latin for "thorn-bush". Duma is placed in the tribe Polygoneae of the subfamily Polygonoideae. Within the tribe, it is most closely related to the genera Atraphaxis and Polygonum, forming the so-called "DAP clade", and is not so closely related to Muehlenbeckia.

- Polygoneae
  - Knorringia
  - - - Polygonum ciliinode (syn. Fallopia ciliinodis)
      - DAP clade
        - Duma
        - - Atraphaxis
          - Polygonum
    - RMF clade
      - Reynoutria
      - - Muehlenbeckia
        - Fallopia s.s.

=== Species ===
As of March 2019, three species were accepted by Plants of the World Online:

- Duma coccoloboides (J.M.Black) T.M.Schust. (syn. Muehlenbeckia coccoloboides)
- Duma florulenta (Meisn.) T.M.Schust. (syn. Muehlenbeckia florulenta)
- Duma horrida (H.Gross) T.M.Schust. (syn. Muehlenbeckia horrida)
