= Knorringia =

Scientific classification
- Kingdom: Plantae
- Clade: Tracheophytes
- Clade: Angiosperms
- Clade: Eudicots
- Order: Caryophyllales
- Family: Polygonaceae
- Subfamily: Polygonoideae
- Genus: Knorringia (Czukav.) Tzvelev

Genus of flowering plants

Knorringia is a genus of plants in the family Polygonaceae. It is native to Central Asia and Siberia.

== Description ==
Species of Knorringia are perennial herbaceous plants growing to about 40 cm (16 in) tall from a slender, often branched rhizome. The stem may be more-or-less upright or decumbent. The leaves are arranged alternately, usually lobed, carried on a short five-sided leaf stalk (petiole) with two distinct wings. The ochreas are 3–20 mm (0.1–0.8 in) long, and form membranous tubes that partly or fully wrap around the stem. The inflorescence is either a panicle made up of a few racemes or a single raceme. The flowers usually have five greenish-white tepals and eight stamens, included within the flower. They are either bisexual or have the gynoecium poorly developed. The fruits are in the form of achenes. The seeds have a thick outer layer (exotesta) and a very thin inner layer (endotesta).

== Taxonomy ==
In 1966, Anna Czukavina created a section within the genus Polygonum, P. sect. Knorringia. The section was raised to the rank of genus in 1987 by Nikolai Tzvelev, and independently in 1989 by Suk-Pyo Hong. The genus is placed in the tribe Polygoneae in the subfamily Polygonoideae. A 2015 molecular phylogenetic study suggested that it was sister to all the remaining genera in the tribe, although only K. sibirica was included in the analysis.

- Polygoneae
  - Knorringia
  - - - Polygonum ciliinode (syn. Fallopia ciliinodis)
      - DAP clade
        - Duma
        - - Atraphaxis
          - Polygonum
    - RMF clade
      - Reynoutria
      - - Muehlenbeckia
        - Fallopia s.s.

=== Species ===
As of March 2019, Plants of the World Online accepted the following species:

- Knorringia pamirica (Korsh.) Tzvelev
- Knorringia sibirica (Laxm.) Tzvelev
