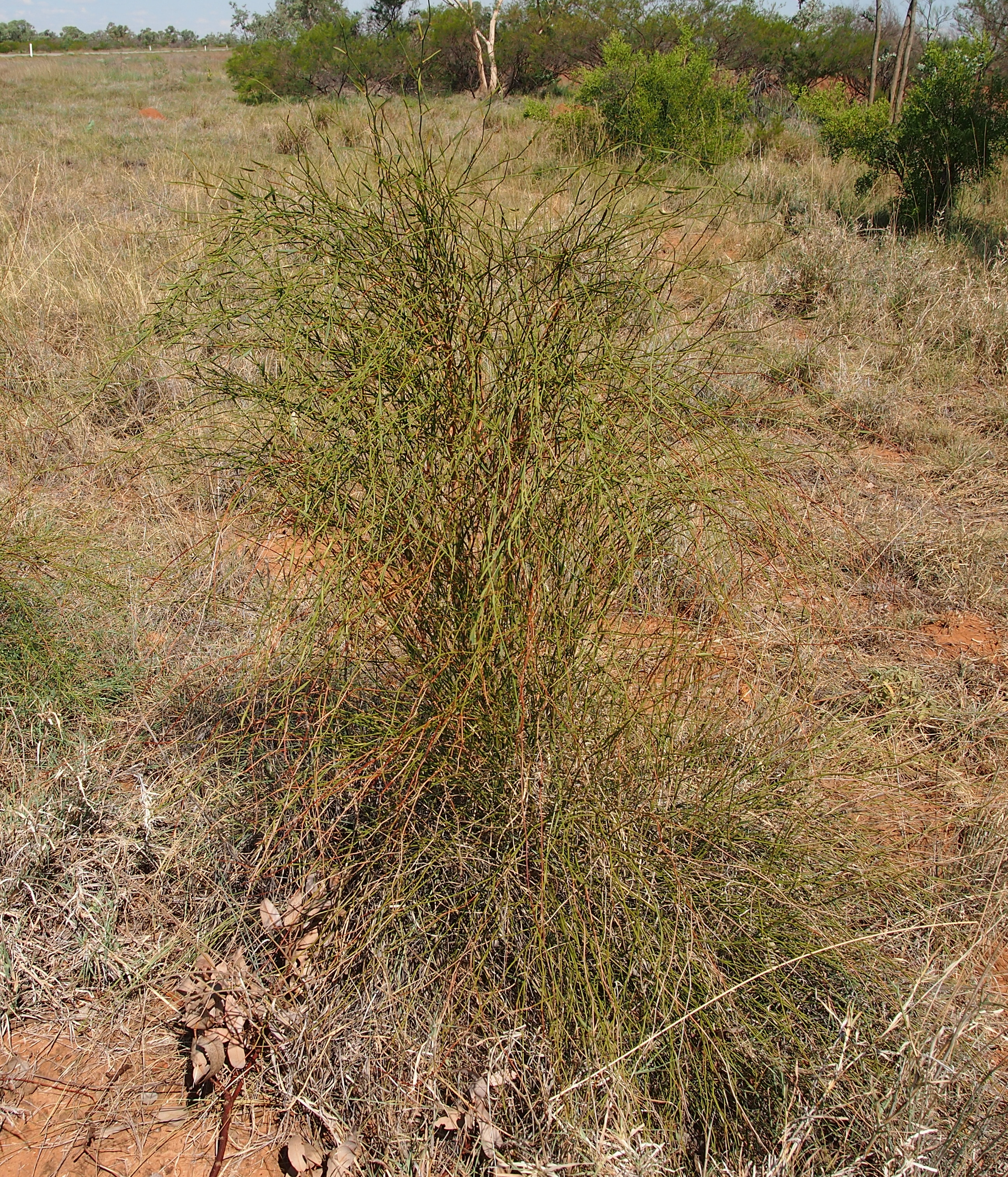

Scientific classification
- Kingdom: Plantae
- Clade: Embryophytes
- Clade: Tracheophytes
- Clade: Angiosperms
- Clade: Eudicots
- Order: Caryophyllales
- Family: Polygonaceae
- Genus: Duma
- Species: D. florulenta

Binomial name
- Duma florulenta (Meisn.) T.M.Schust.
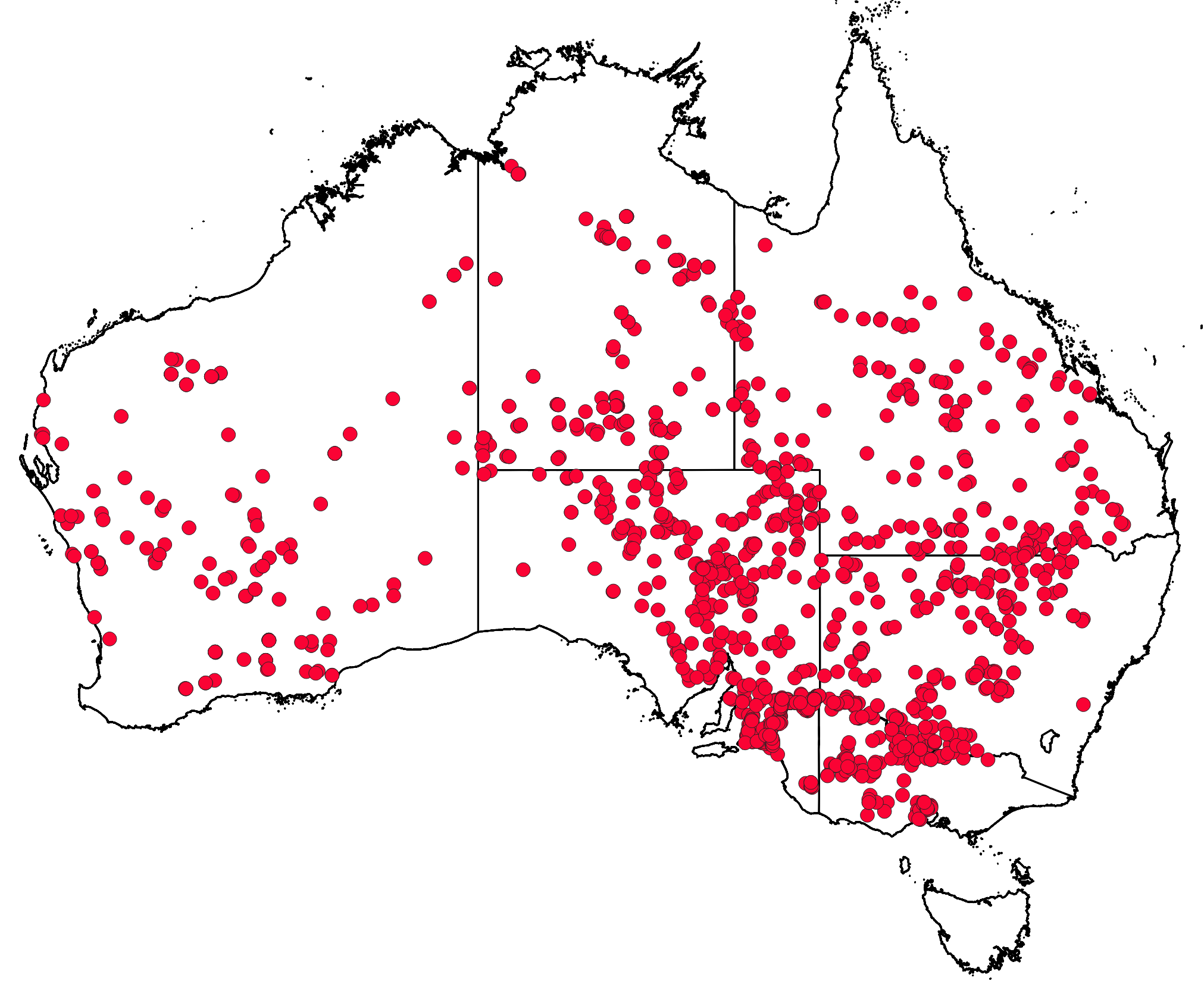
- Occurrence data from AVH

Synonyms
- Muehlenbeckia cunninghamii (Meisn.) F.Muell.; Muehlenbeckia florulenta Meisn.; Muehlenbeckia juncea (Mitch.) Druce; Polygonum cunninghamii Meisn.; Polygonum junceum Mitch.

= Duma florulenta =

Tangled lignum

Species of plant

Duma florulenta (synonym Muehlenbeckia florulenta), commonly known as tangled lignum or often simply lignum, is a plant native to inland Australia. It is associated with wetland habitats, especially those in arid and semiarid regions subject to cycles of intermittent flooding and drying out. The Wiradjuri name for the plant is gweeargal, and the Walmajarri name is Kirinykiriny, or Kurinykuriny.

== Description ==
Lignum is a perennial, dioecious shrub, growing to 2.5 m in height, with its multitude of thin, intertwined and tangled branches and branchlets forming dense thickets to the exclusion of other species. Its thin, narrow leaves are 15–70 mm long and 2–10 mm wide. The grey-green stems often end in a sharp point. The flowers are small and cream to yellowish, solitary or clustered along the branchlets and occurring through most of the year. The fruit is top-shaped, dry, and about 5 mm long.

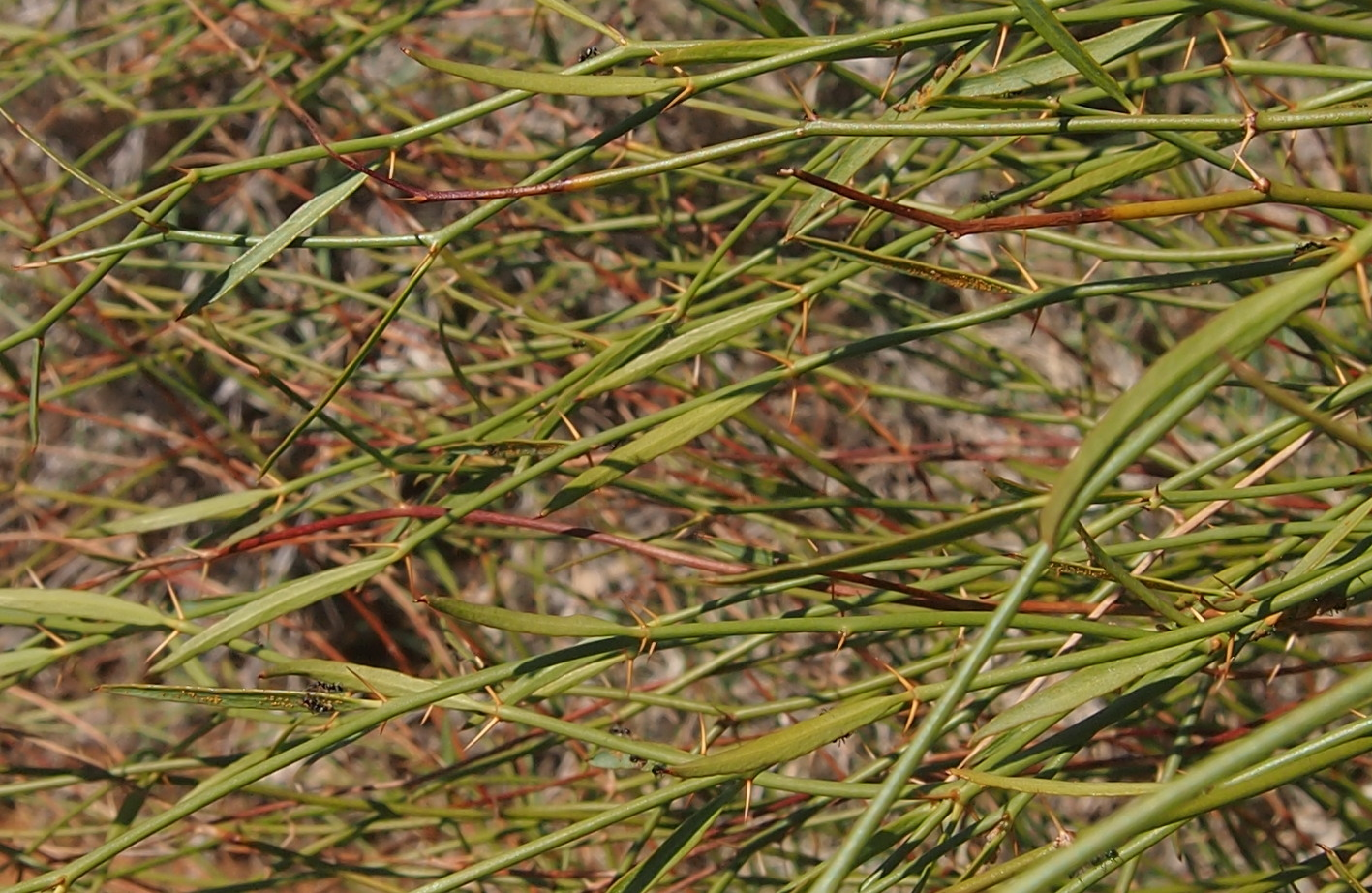
Foliage

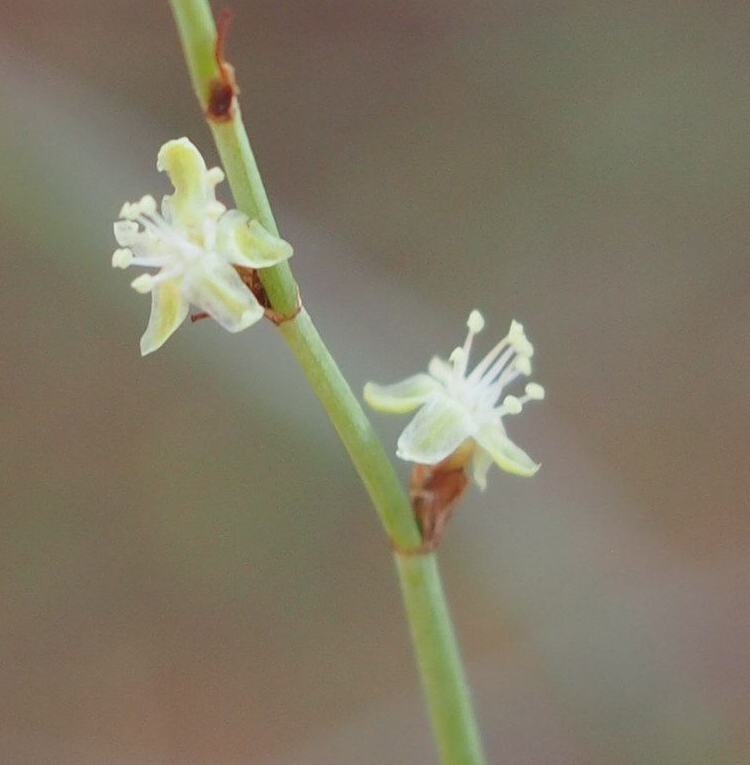
Male Flowers

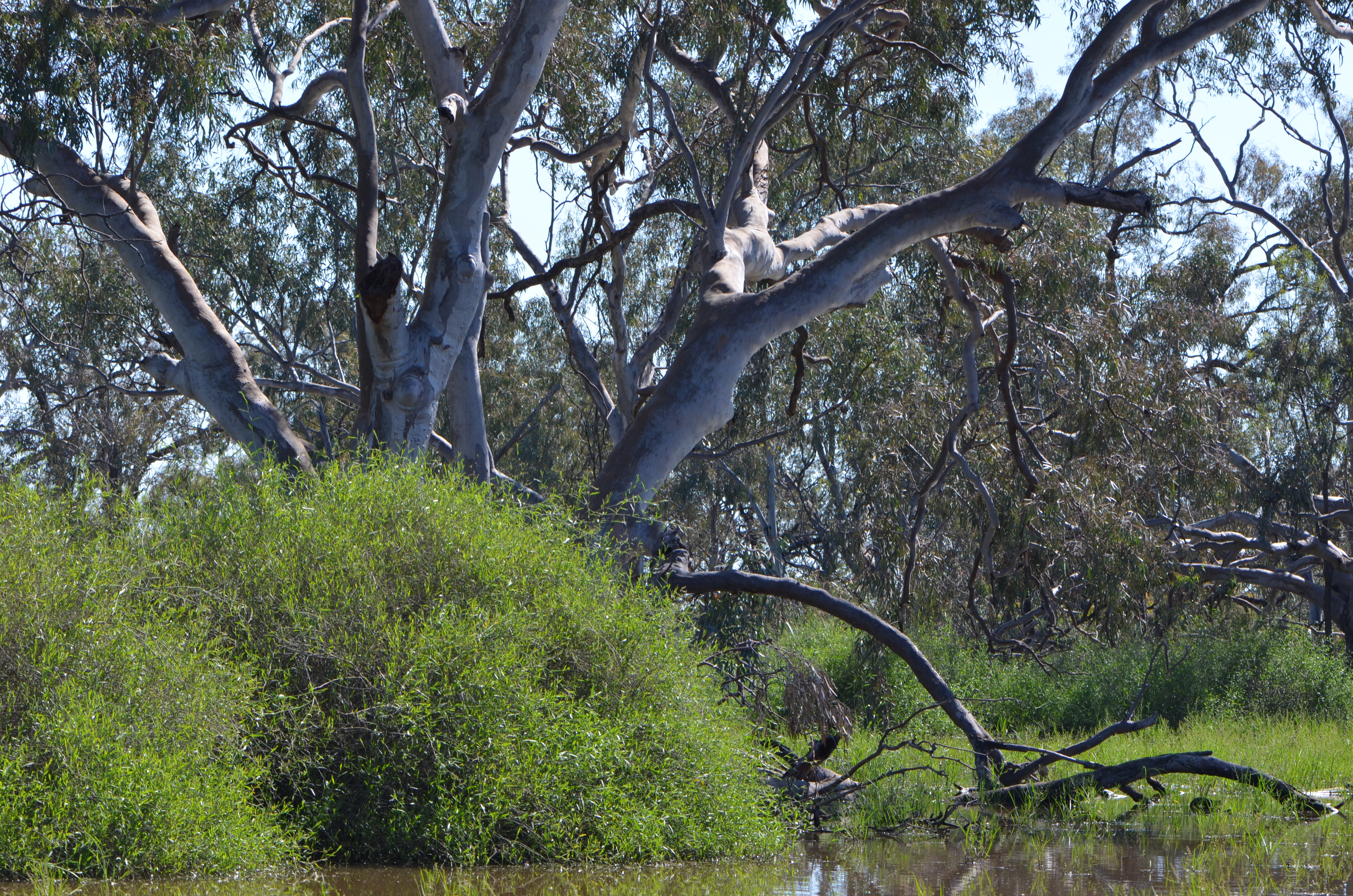
habitat, Macquarie Marshes

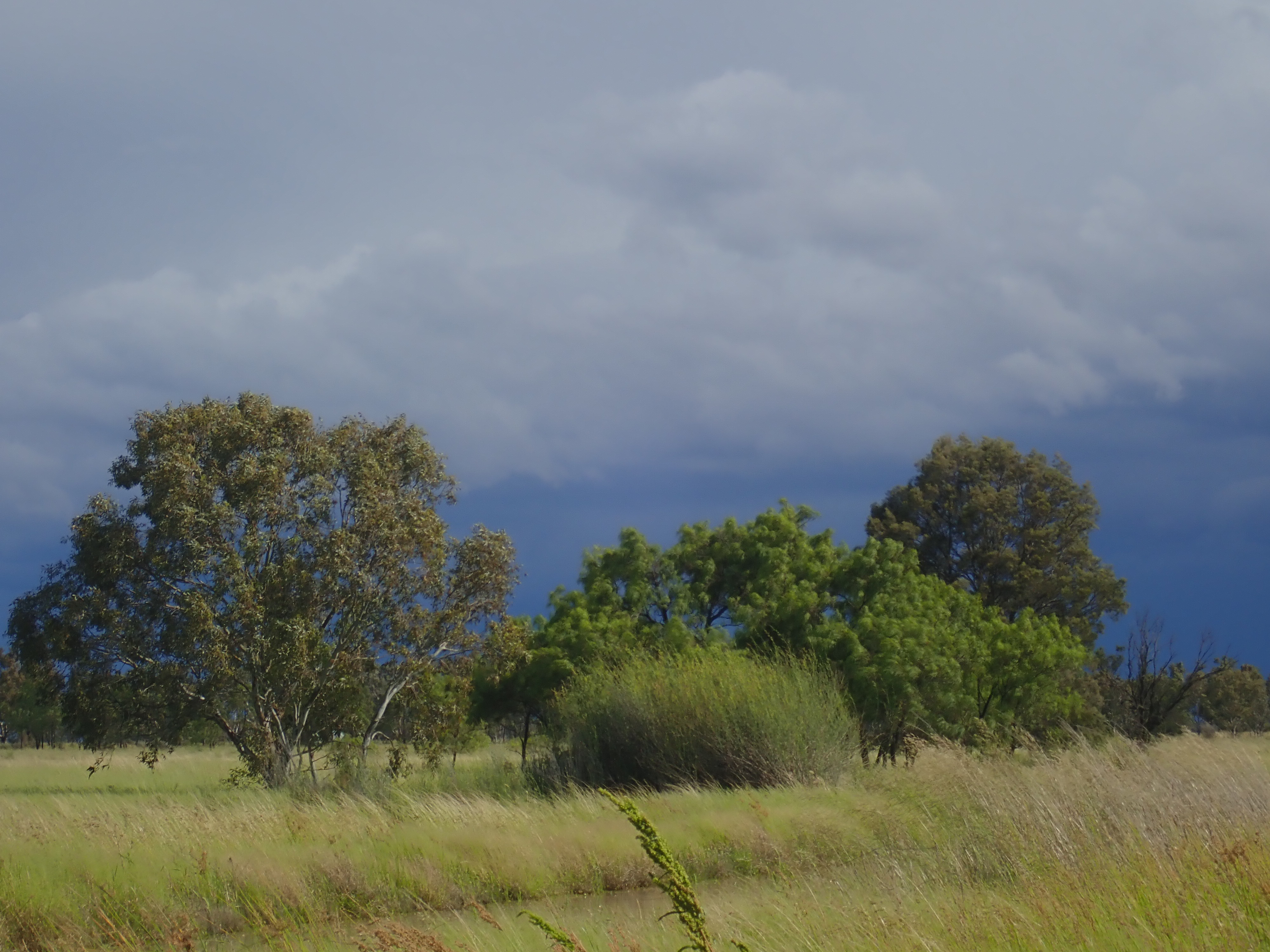
At most south-eastern edge of its distribution, north east of West Wyalong

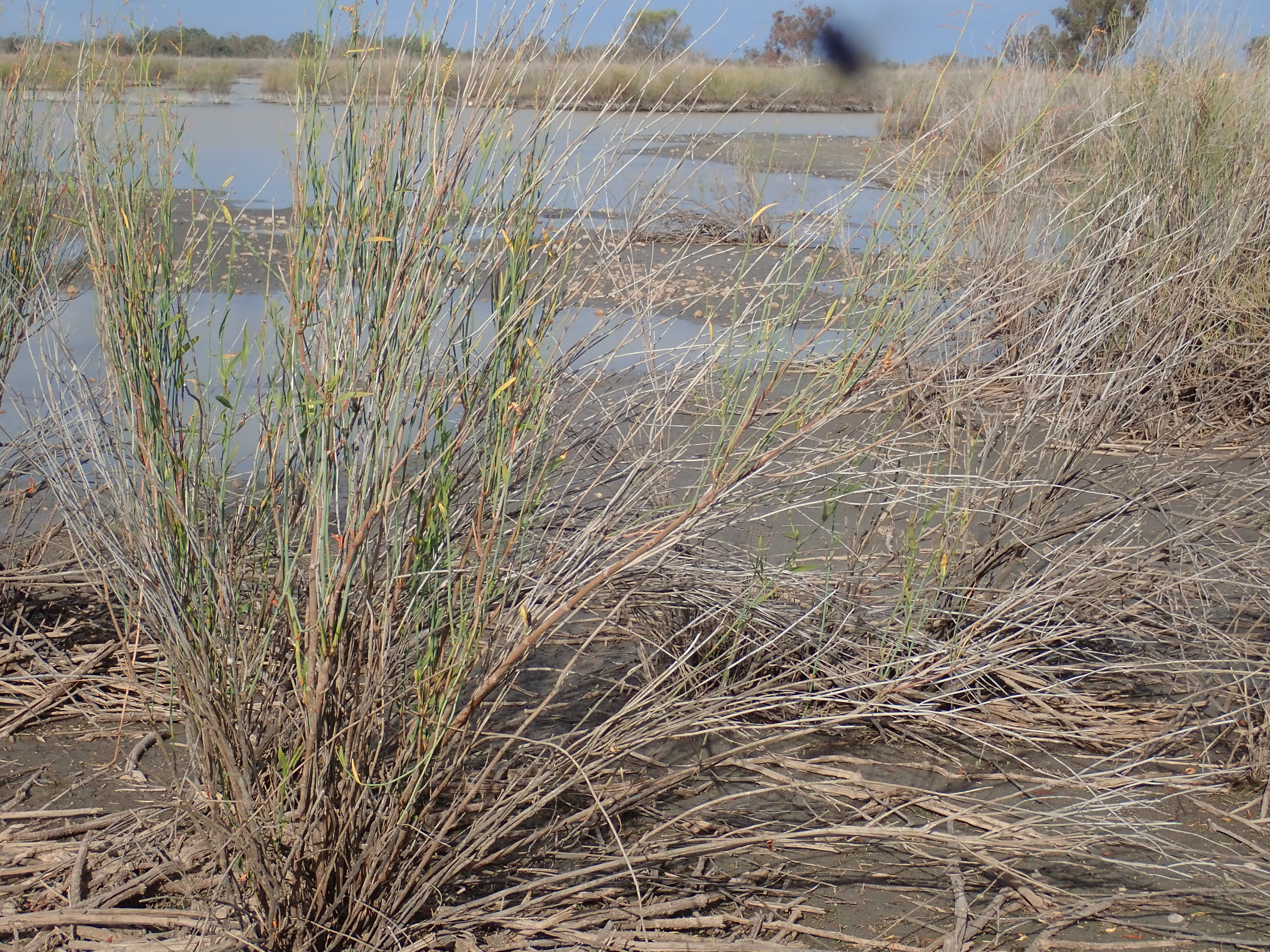
Lignum swamp, Narran Lake nature reserve

Lignum often appears leafless as the leaves are produced on younger growth but soon die off, especially in dry conditions. New leaves and shoots are rapidly produced in response to rainfall or flooding. The plant has a very deep root system, penetrating the soil to at least 3 m in depth. It is highly tolerant of salinity and drought and may be used as an indicator of dryland soil salinity. Because of its densely tangled growth habit, it provides protected breeding habitat for native wildlife such as waterbirds, though it can also provide refuge for pest species such as feral pigs, foxes and rabbits.

== Taxonomy ==
The species was first described by Carl Meisner in 1856 as Muehlenbeckia florulenta. Molecular phylogenetic studies showed that M. florulenta, along with some other species placed in the same genus, form a distinct clade, separate from Muehlenbeckia, so a new genus, Duma, was erected, and this species transferred as Duma florulenta.

== Distribution and habitat ==
Lignum occurs in all of Australia's mainland states, as well as the Northern Territory. The plant's preferred habitats include floodplains, swamps, gilgais and other intermittently flooded areas. In southern Australia it is often associated with stands of river red gum and black box.

== Aboriginal uses ==
During the long period when the Australian government took children from their aboriginal parents (see Stolen generations), the Walmajarri people hid themselves and their children within the dense tangle of these plants so that the police could not find them.
