= Calligonum leucocladum =

Scientific classification
- Kingdom: Plantae
- Clade: Tracheophytes
- Clade: Angiosperms
- Clade: Eudicots
- Order: Caryophyllales
- Family: Polygonaceae
- Genus: Calligonum
- Species: C. leucocladum

Binomial name
- Calligonum leucocladum (Schrenk) Bunge

Synonyms
- Calligonum alatiforme Pavlov; Calligonum anfractuosum Bunge; Calligonum aralense I.G.Borshch.; Calligonum batiola Litv.; Calligonum cordipterum Drobow; Calligonum elegans Drobow; Calligonum gracile Litv.; Calligonum integrum Drobow; Calligonum karakalpakense Drobow; Calligonum leucocladum subsp. elegans (Drobow) Soskov; Calligonum lipskyi Litv.; Calligonum margelanicum Drobow; Calligonum obtusum Litv.; Calligonum parvulum Drobow; Calligonum patens Litv.; Calligonum physopterum Pavlov; Calligonum plicatum Pavlov; Pterococcus leucocladus Schrenk

Species of flowering plant

Calligonum leucocladum (many synonyms including Calligonum elegans) is a species of flowering plant in the family Polygonaceae. It is native to Central Asia (Kazakhstan, Kyrgyzstan, Tajikistan, Turkmenistan and Uzbekistan) and to Xinjiang in China. In Uzbekistan, it is limited to the Sokh River basin where it is endangered with a population fragmented by habitat loss from cutting and grazing.
