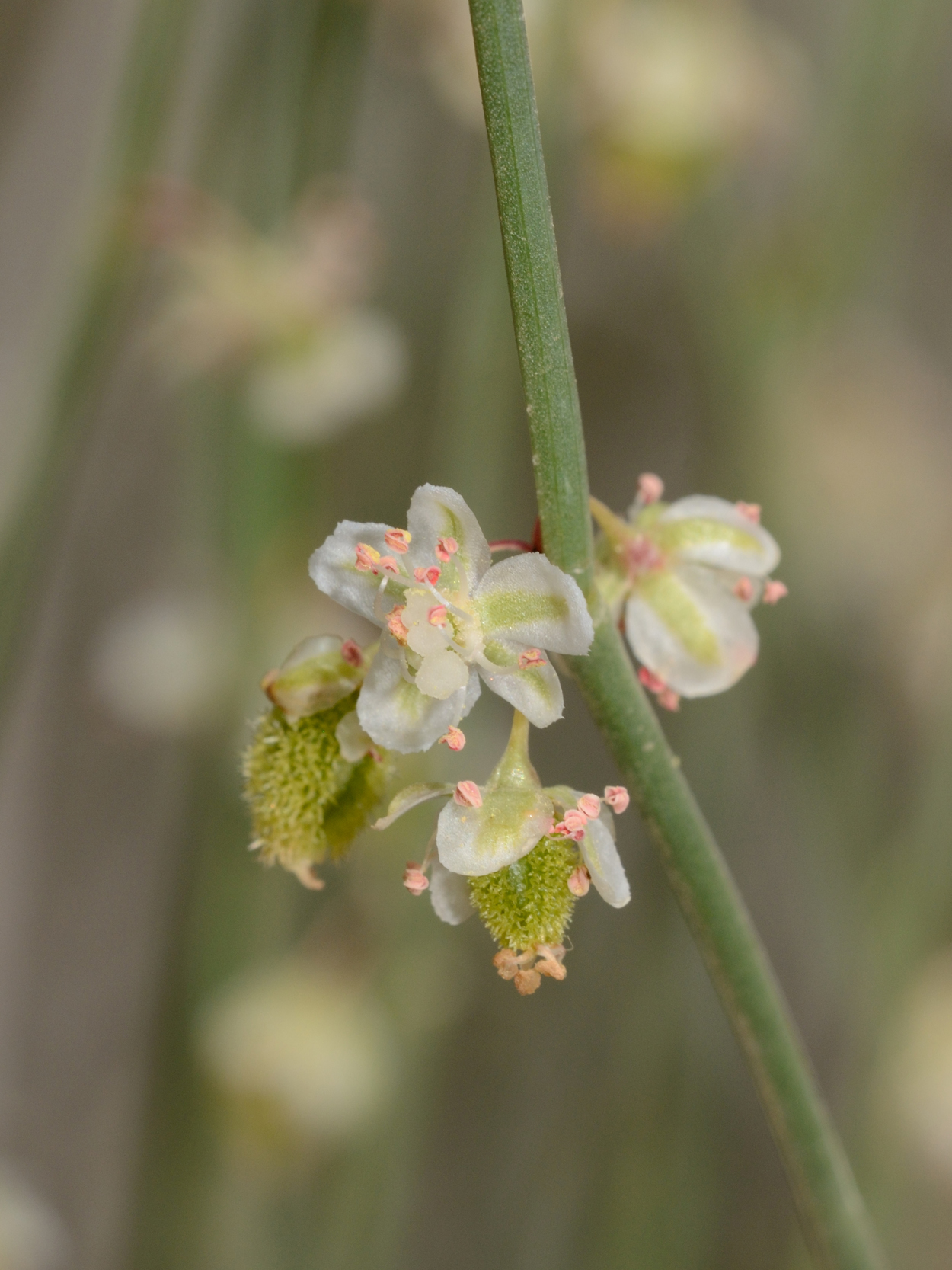
- Flowers

Scientific classification
- Kingdom: Plantae
- Clade: Tracheophytes
- Clade: Angiosperms
- Clade: Eudicots
- Order: Caryophyllales
- Family: Polygonaceae
- Genus: Calligonum
- Species: C. comosum

Binomial name
- Calligonum comosum L'Hér.

Synonyms
- Calligonum mejidum Al-Khayat; Calligonum mejidum var. thirtharicum Al-Khayat; Calligonum polygonoides subsp. comosus (L'Hér.) Soskov; Pallasia comosa (L'Hér.) Raeusch.

= Calligonum comosum =

Species of flowering plant

Calligonum comosum, the fire bush, arta or abal, is a species of flowering plant in the family Polygonaceae.

The plant grows to around 1.2 metres (4 feet) tall, with green branches that split off from the main stem like the wisps of a broom. The plant is high in sugar and nitrogen.

It is native to the Sahara, Socotra, the Arabian Peninsula, and in the Middle East as far east as Pakistan and the Rajasthan desert in western India.

The flowers can be eaten fresh. It is useful as a stabilizer of sand dunes, forage for livestock, smokeless firewood, and an indicator of fresh water.

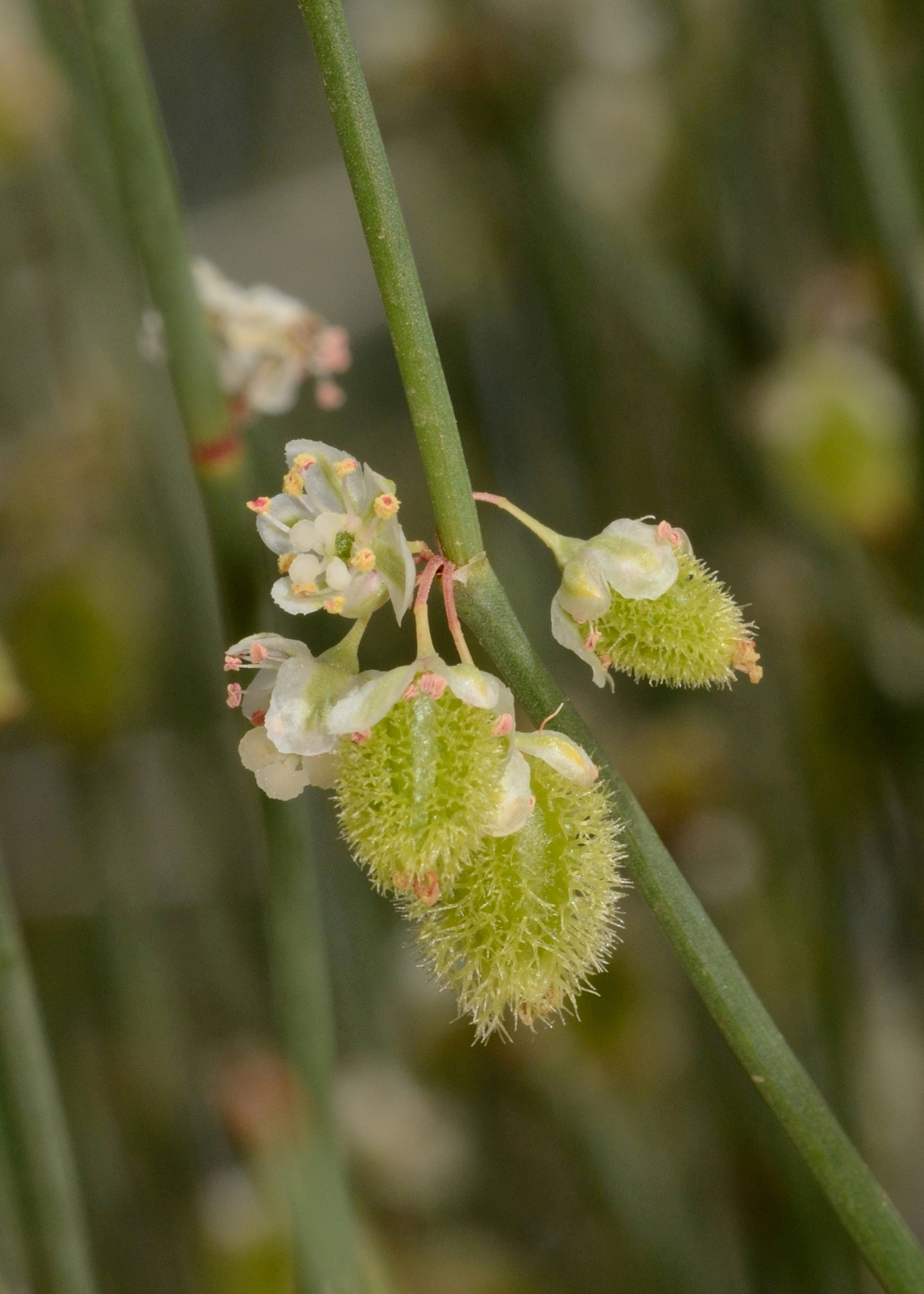
Fruit maturing
