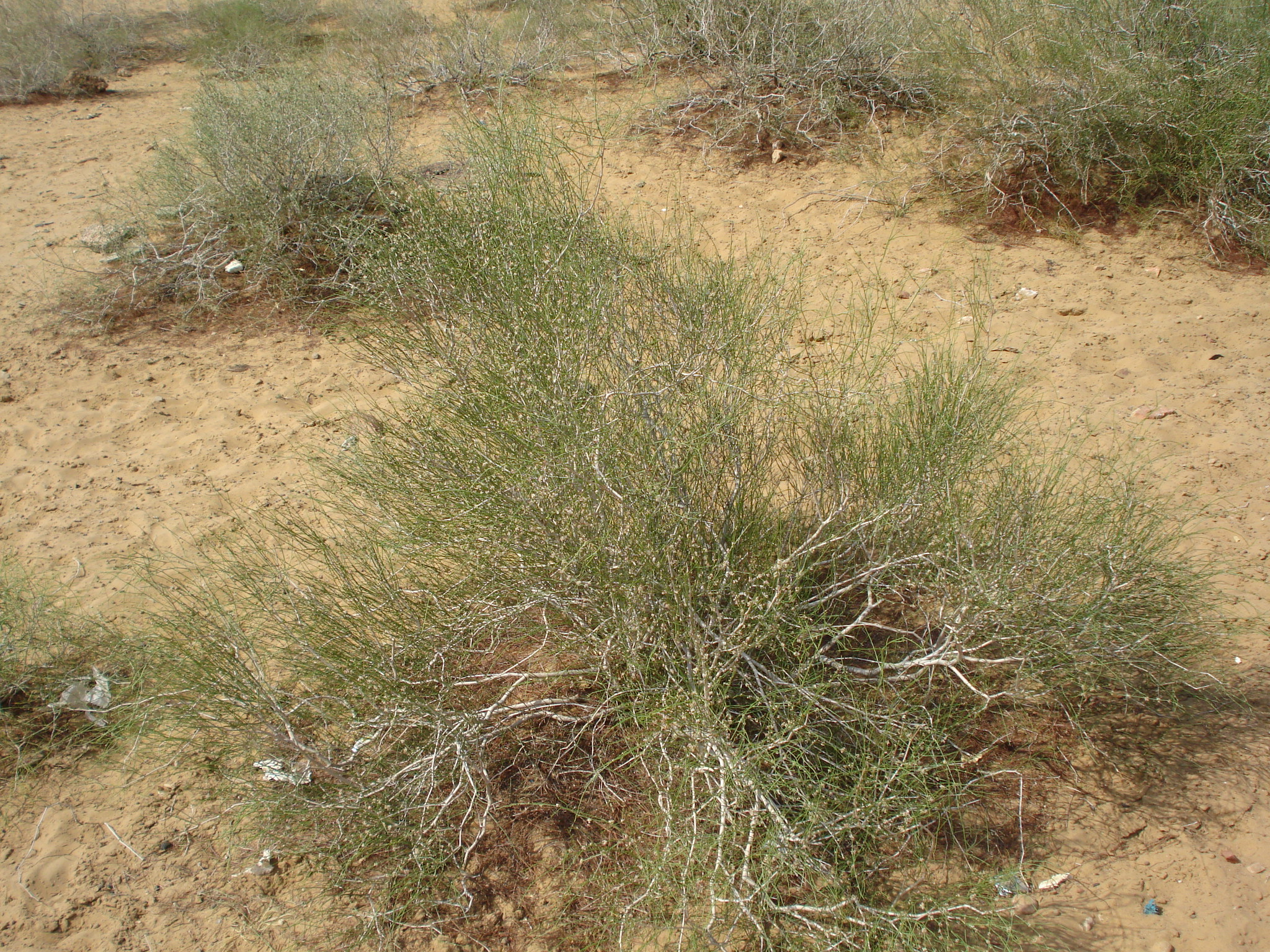
- Calligonum polygonoides

Scientific classification
- Kingdom: Plantae
- Clade: Tracheophytes
- Clade: Angiosperms
- Clade: Eudicots
- Order: Caryophyllales
- Family: Polygonaceae
- Subfamily: Polygonoideae
- Genus: Calligonum; L.

Species
- See text

Synonyms
- Calliphysa Fisch. & C.A.Mey.; Gibsonia Stocks; Pallasia L.f.; Polygonoides Ortega; Pterococcus Pall.

= Calligonum =

Genus of flowering plants

Calligonum is a genus of plants in the family Polygonaceae with about 41 species native to Northern Africa, Western, South, and Central Asia, and central China.

== Description ==
Plants of the genus Calligonum are shrubs, diffusely but irregularly branched, with flexuous woody branches. Leaves are simple, opposite, nearly sessile, linear or scale-like, sometimes absent or very small, linear or filiform, distinct or united with short membranous ochreae. Flowers are bisexual, solitary or in loose axillary inflorescences. Flowers have persistent, 5-parted perianths not accrescent in fruit, and 10-18 stamens with filaments connate at the base. The ovary is tetragonous.

== Taxonomy ==
The genus Calligonum was first published by Carl Linnaeus in 1753. It is placed in the subfamily Polygonoideae, tribe Calligoneae, along with its sister genus, Pteropyrum.

=== Species ===
41 species are accepted.

- Calligonum acanthopterum I.G.Borshch.
- Calligonum alatosetosum Maassoumi & Kazempour
- Calligonum aphyllum (Pall.) Gürke
- Calligonum arborescens Litv.
- Calligonum azel Maire
- Calligonum babakianum Godw.
- Calligonum bakuense Litv.
- Calligonum × barsukiense Soskov
- Calligonum bucocladum Bunge
- Calligonum bykovii Godw.
- Calligonum × calcareum Pavlov
- Calligonum calvescens Maire
- Calligonum caput-medusae Schrenk ex Fisch. & C.A.Mey.
- Calligonum comosum L'Hér.
- Calligonum crinitum Boiss.
- Calligonum crispum Bunge
- Calligonum cristatum Bunge
- Calligonum × densum I.G.Borshch.
- Calligonum × dissectum Popov
- Calligonum × dubianskyi Litv.
- Calligonum ebinuricum N.A.Ivanova ex Soskov
- Calligonum eriopodum Bunge
- Calligonum inerme Kamelin, Gorelova & A.V.Pavlenko
- Calligonum jeminaicum Z.M.Mao
- Calligonum junceum (Fisch. & C.A.Mey.) Litv.
- Calligonum klementzii Losinsk.
- Calligonum laristanicum Rech.f. & Schiman-Czeika
- Calligonum leucocladum (Schrenk) Bunge
- Calligonum litwinowii Drobow
- Calligonum macrocarpum I.G.Borshch.
- Calligonum matteianum Drobow
- Calligonum microcarpum I.G.Borshch.
- Calligonum mongolicum Turcz.
- Calligonum murex Bunge
- Calligonum × paletzkianum Litv.
- Calligonum polygonoides L.
- Calligonum rubicundum Bunge
- Calligonum santoanum Korovin
- Calligonum schizopterum Rech.f. & Schiman-Czeika
- Calligonum setosum (Litv.) Litv.
- Calligonum spinosetosum Maassoumi & Batooli
- Calligonum × spinulosum Drobow
- Calligonum × squarrosum Pavlov
- Calligonum taklimakanense B.R.Pan & K.M.Shen
- Calligonum tetrapterum Jaub. & Spach
- Calligonum trifarium Z.M.Mao
- Calligonum triste Litv.
- Calligonum turbineum Pavlov
- Calligonum zakirovii (Khalk.) Czerep.
