= Calligonum junceum =

Scientific classification
- Kingdom: Plantae
- Clade: Tracheophytes
- Clade: Angiosperms
- Clade: Eudicots
- Order: Caryophyllales
- Family: Polygonaceae
- Genus: Calligonum
- Species: C. junceum

Binomial name
- Calligonum junceum Litv.

Species of plant

Calligonum junceum fruit

Calligonum junceum is a small shrub native to Central Asia and China, including the Kyzylkum Desert. It has been introduced to the Sahara. It is long fruiting.
