= Glacier National Park =

Glacier National Park may refer to:

- Glacier National Park (Canada), in British Columbia, Canada
- Glacier National Park (U.S.), in Montana, USA

== See also ==
- Glacier Bay National Park, in Alaska, USA
- Los Glaciares National Park, in Patagonia, Argentina
