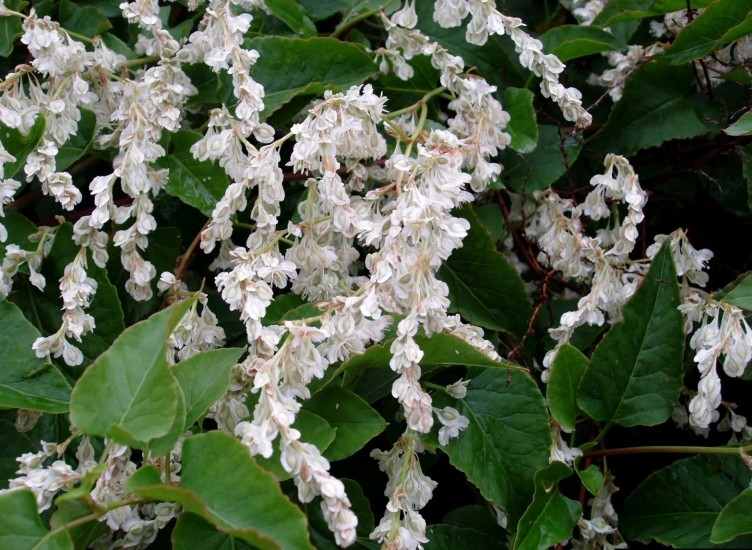
- Fallopia baldschuanica

Scientific classification
- Kingdom: Plantae
- Clade: Embryophytes
- Clade: Tracheophytes
- Clade: Angiosperms
- Clade: Eudicots
- Order: Caryophyllales
- Family: Polygonaceae
- Subfamily: Polygonoideae; Arn.

Tribes and genera
- See text.

= Polygonoideae =

Subfamily of the knotweed family of plants

Polygonoideae is a subfamily of plants in the family Polygonaceae. It includes a number of plants that can be highly invasive, such as Japanese knotweed, Reynoutria japonica, and its hybrid with R. sachalinensis, R. × bohemica. The subfamily also includes the cultivated genus Rheum, rhubarb. Boundaries between the genera placed in the subfamily and their relationships have long been problematic, but a series of molecular phylogenetic studies have clarified some of them, resulting in the division of the subfamily into seven tribes.

== Taxonomy ==
=== Phylogeny ===
A 2015 molecular phylogenetic study suggested that the genera and tribes in Polygonoideae were related as shown in the following cladogram.

- Polygonoideae
  - Oxygoneae (Oxygonum)
  - - Persicarieae (Bistorta, Koenigia, Persicaria)
    - - Fagopyreae (Fagopyrum)
      - - Pteroxygoneae (Pteroxygonum + some Fallopia)
        - - Calligoneae (Calligonum, Pteropyrum)
          - - Rumiceae (Oxyria, Rheum, Rumex)
            - Polygoneae (Atraphaxis, Duma, Fallopia, Knorringia, Muehlenbeckia, Polygonum, Reynoutria)

Rumex included Emex, and Fallopia was not monophyletic, with some species placed outside the main group in the tribe Polygoneae, and some others grouping with Pteroxygonum, placed in the tribe Pteroxygoneae.

=== Genera ===
Some of the boundaries between the genera are not settled as of February 2019; in particular, Fallopia is at least paraphyletic. A 2011 classification divided the subfamily into five tribes, Calligoneae, Fagopyreae, Persicariae, Polygoneae and Rumiceae, leaving some genera unplaced. A 2015 molecular phylogenetic study added two new tribes accommodating these genera, Oxygoneae and Pteroxygoneae. Genera and their tribal placement accepted in the 2015 study are shown below.

- Tribe Calligoneae C.A.Mey
  - Calligonum
  - Pteropyrum
- Tribe Fagopyreae Yonek.
  - Fagopyrum
- Tribe Oxygoneae T.M.Schust. & Reveal
  - Oxygonum
- Tribe Persicariae Dumort.
  - Bistorta
  - Koenigia
  - Persicaria
- Tribe Polygoneae Rchb.
  - Atraphaxis
  - Duma
  - Fallopia
  - Knorringia
  - Muehlenbeckia
  - Polygonum
  - Reynoutria
- Tribe Pteroxygoneae T.M.Schust. & Reveal
  - Pteroxygonum
- Tribe Rumiceae Dumort.
  - Oxyria
  - Rheum
  - Rumex (including Emex)

Many species in the subfamily have at one time or another been placed in different genera; for example the invasive Japanese knotweed is currently in the genus Reynoutria, but has been in Polygonum and Fallopia.
