= Pink knotweed =

Pink knotweed is a common name for several plants in the knotweed family (Polygonaceae) and may refer to:

- Persicaria capitata, an ornamental plant native to Asia
- Persicaria pensylvanica, a flowering plant native to North America
