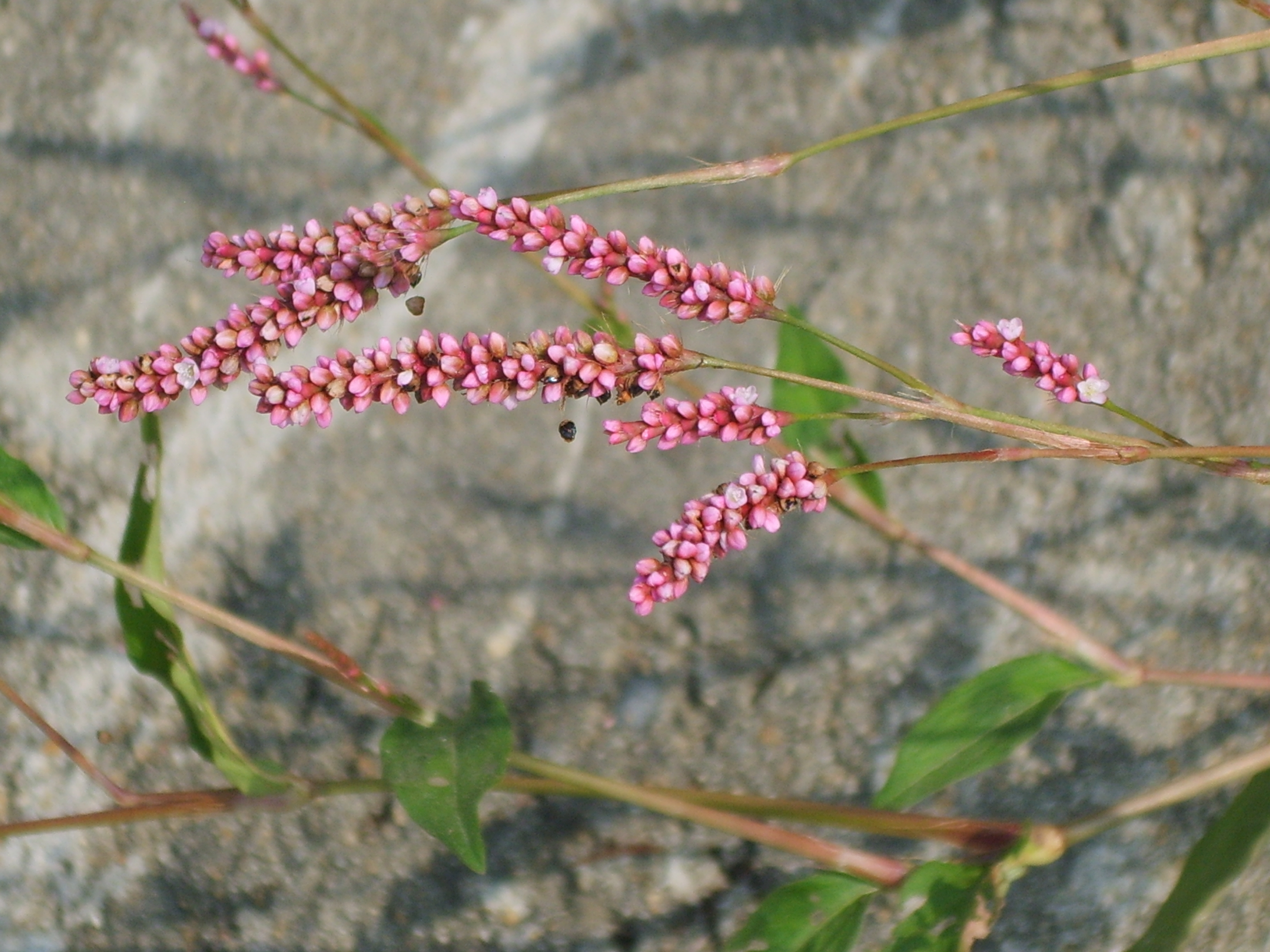

Scientific classification
- Kingdom: Plantae
- Clade: Tracheophytes
- Clade: Angiosperms
- Clade: Eudicots
- Order: Caryophyllales
- Family: Polygonaceae
- Genus: Persicaria
- Species: P. longiseta

Binomial name
- Persicaria longiseta (Bruijn) Kitagawa 1937

Synonyms
- Polygonum cespitosum var. longisetum (Bruijn) C.F.Reed 1987; Polygonum longisetum Bruijn 1854; Polygonum caespitosum var. longisetum (Bruijn) Danser; Polygonum cespitosum var. longisetum (Bruijn) Steward

= Persicaria longiseta =

Species of plant

Persicaria longiseta is a species of flowering plant in the knotweed family known by the common names Oriental lady's thumb, bristly lady's thumb, Asiatic smartweed, long-bristled smartweed, low smartweed, Asiatic waterpepper, bristled knotweed, bunchy knotweed, and tufted knotweed. It is native to Asia (China, India, Russia, Japan, Malaysia, etc.), and it is present in North America and Europe as an introduced species and often a weed.

Persicaria longiseta is an annual herb with stems 30 to 80 centimeters (12–32 inches) long, sometimes reaching one meter (40 inches). The hairless, branching stems may root at lower nodes that come in contact with the substrate. The leaves are lance-shaped and up to 8 centimeters (3.2 inches) long by 3 cm (1.2 inches) wide. They have bristly ochrea. The inflorescence is an elongate cluster up to 8 centimeters (3.2 inches) long and contains many pink flowers. The fruit is a small, smooth achene.

In its native region this plant is a common weed of rice paddies. It was introduced to North America near Philadelphia around 1910 and probably spread via the railroads. It is present in much of the eastern United States and much of Canada. It grows in moist habitat types such as wetlands, as well as dry and upland habitat. It can be found in meadows, marshes, mudflats, riverbanks, floodplains, levees, and lowland and upland forests. It is invasive in some areas.
