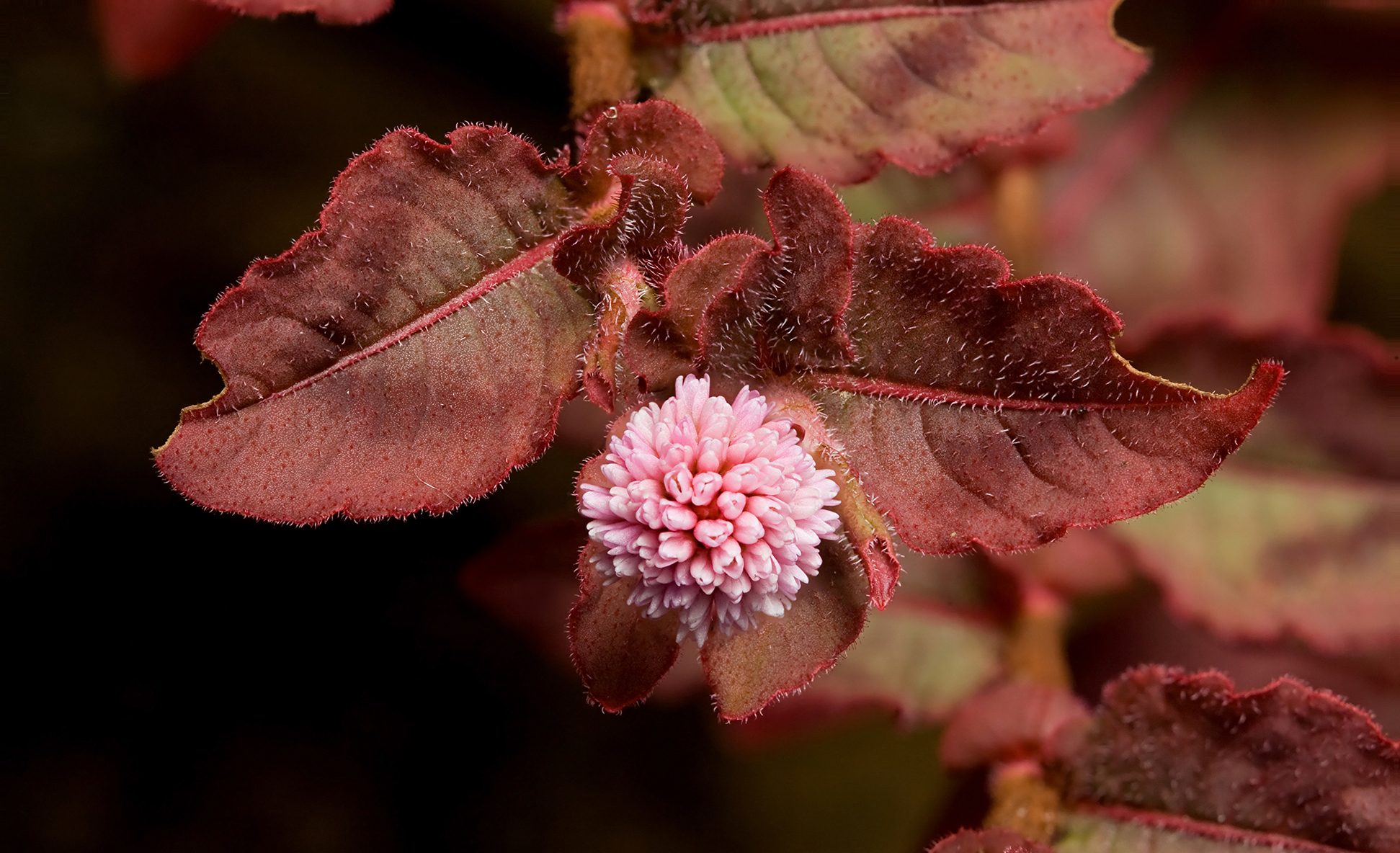
- Persicaria capitata

Scientific classification
- Kingdom: Plantae
- Clade: Tracheophytes
- Clade: Angiosperms
- Clade: Eudicots
- Order: Caryophyllales
- Family: Polygonaceae
- Subfamily: Polygonoideae
- Genus: Persicaria; Mill. 1754

Species
- See text

Synonyms
- List: Amblygonum Rchb.; Antenoron Raf.; Cephalophilon (Meisn.) Spach; Chylocalyx Hassk.; Echinocaulon (Meisn.) Spach; Echinocaulos Hassk.; Goniaticum Stokes; Heptarina Raf.; Lagunaea C.Agardh; Lagunea Lour.; Mitesia Raf.; Peutalis Raf.; Pogalis Raf.; Sunania Raf.; Tasoba Raf.; Tovara Adans.; Tracaulon Raf.; Truellum Houtt.

= Persicaria =

Genus of flowering plants in the knotweed family

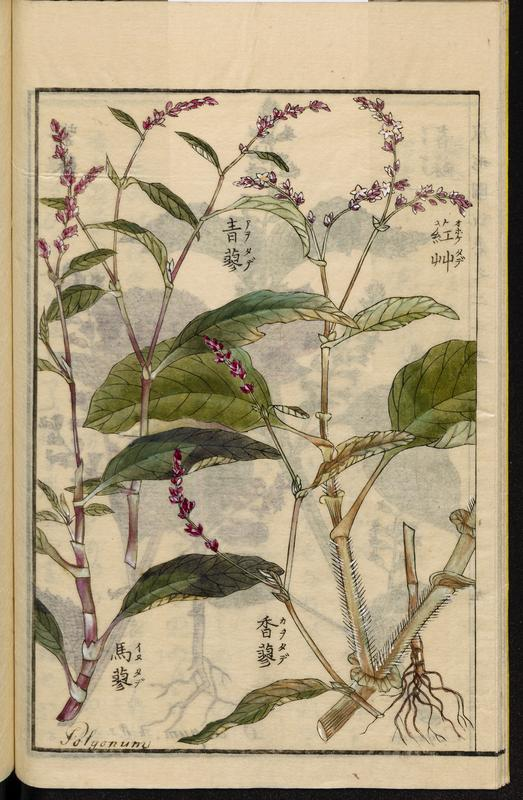
Illustration from the Japanese agricultural encyclopedia Seikei Zusetsu (1804)

Persicaria is a genus of herbaceous flowering plants in the knotweed family, Polygonaceae. Plants of the genus are known commonly as knotweeds or smartweeds. It has a cosmopolitan distribution, with species occurring nearly worldwide. The genus was segregated from Polygonum.

== Description ==
The genus includes annual and perennial herbs with taproots or fibrous root systems, or with rhizomes or stolons. The stems are often erect but may be prostrate along the ground, and some species are prickly. The stems are self-supporting or twining and climbing. The leaves are alternately arranged, deciduous, and variously shaped. The brownish or reddish ochrea may be leathery to papery. The inflorescence may be a panicle or a spikelike or headlike arrangement of fascicles of flowers. The flower is white, greenish, reddish, pink or purple, with the tepals partially fused together along the bases. The fruit is an achene which can take a number of shapes, including a disc or a sphere.

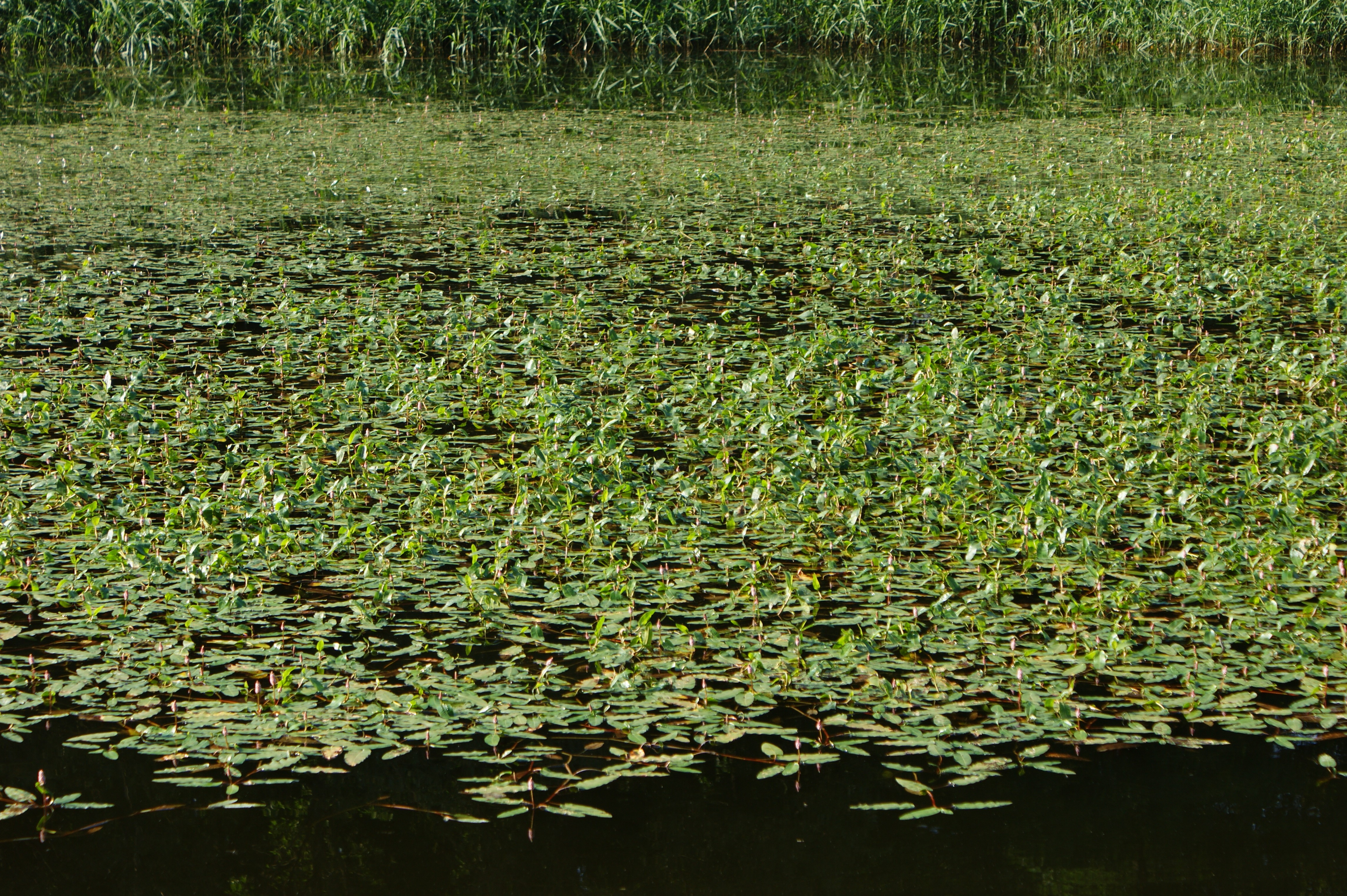
Persicaria amphibia

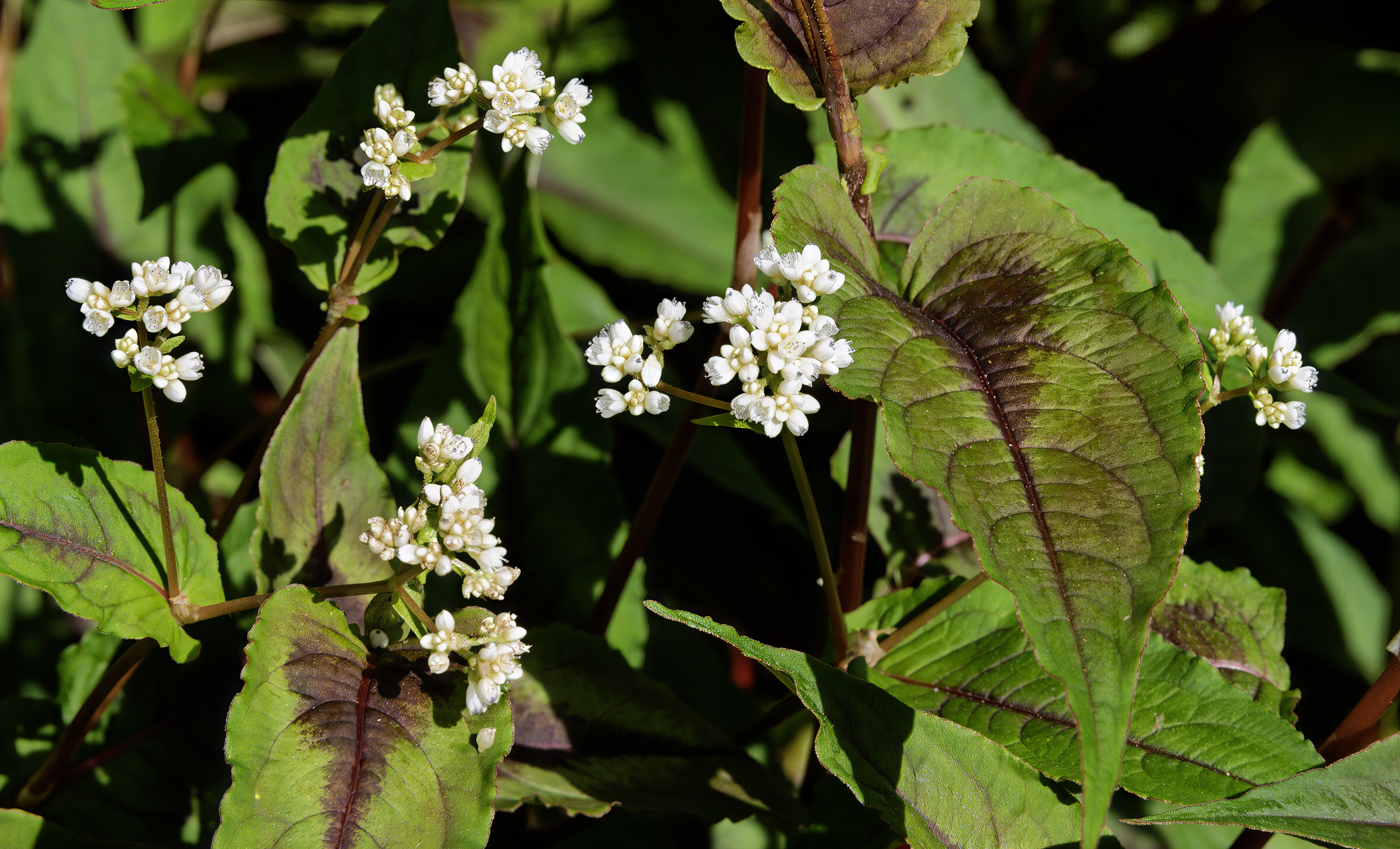
Persicaria microcephala

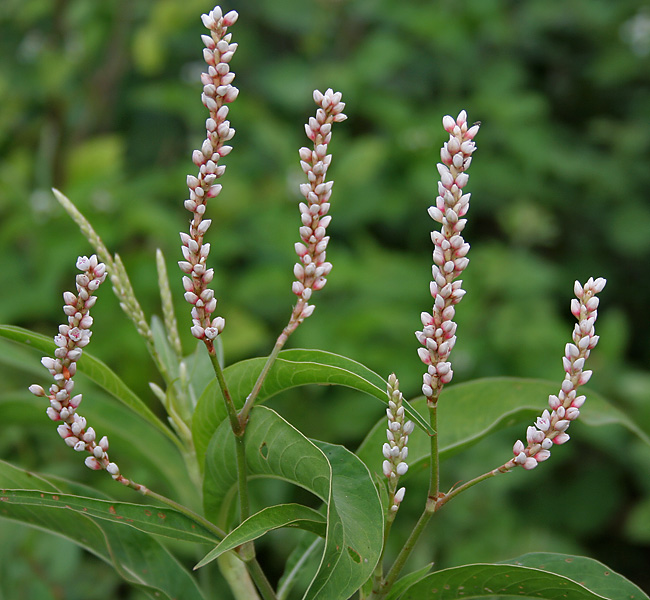
Persicaria glabra

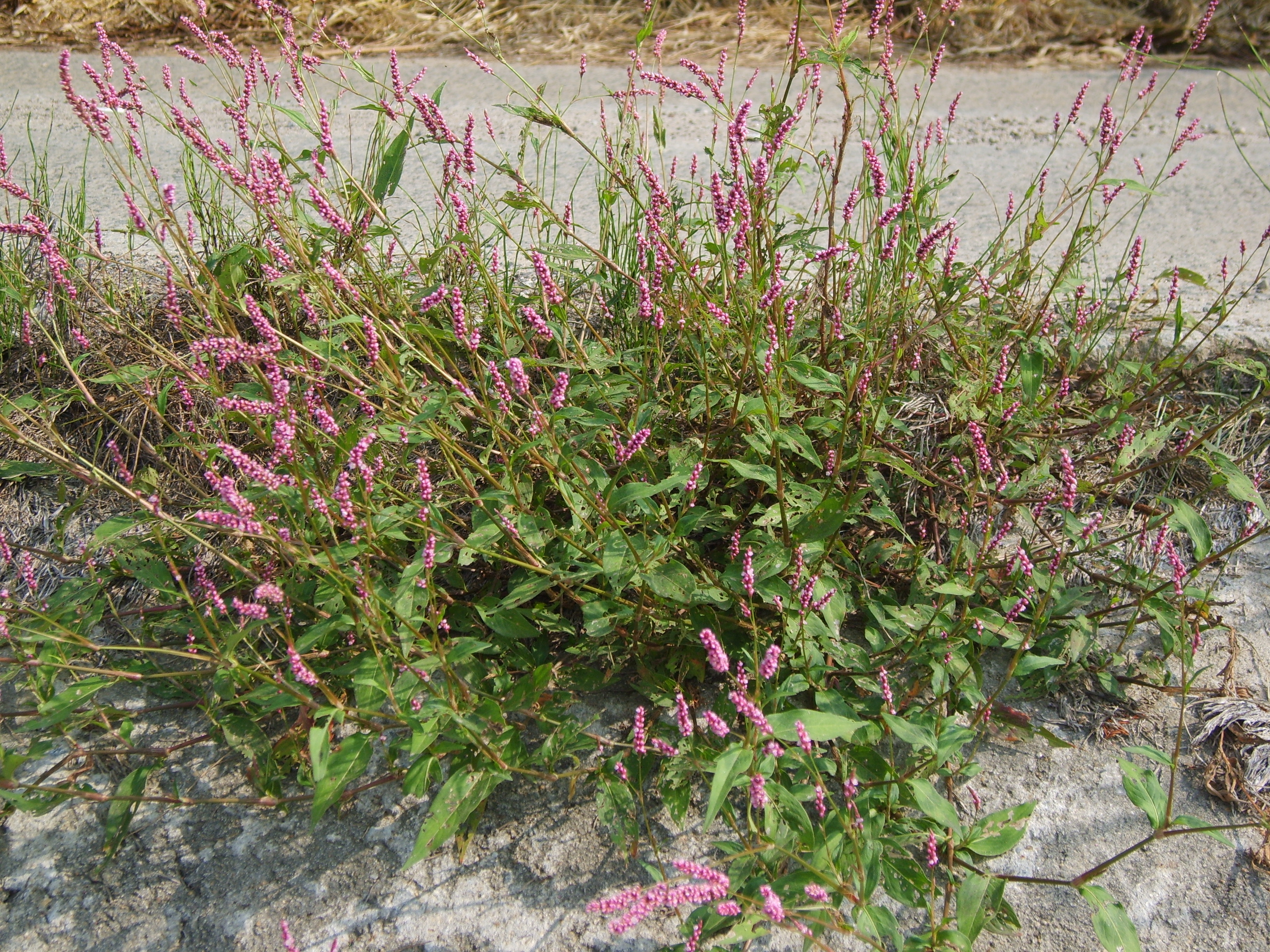
Persicaria longiseta

Persicaria minor

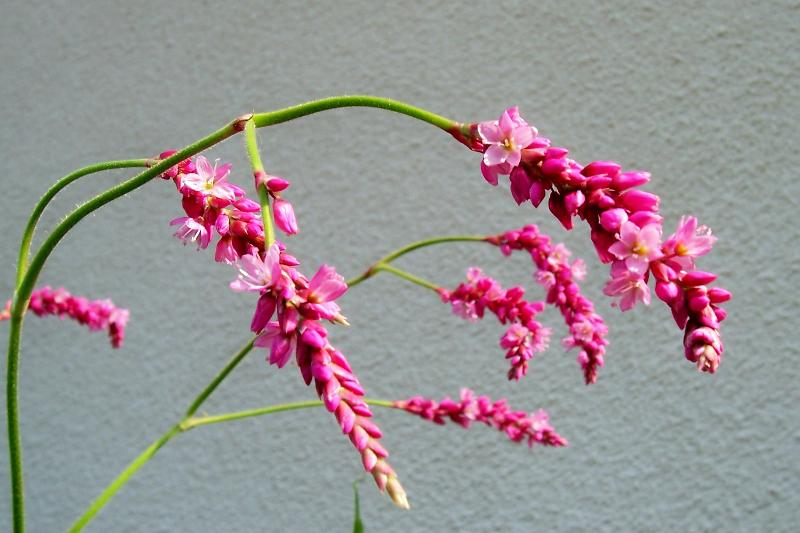
Persicaria orientalis

== Taxonomy ==
Within the family Polygonaceae, Persicaria is placed in the subfamily Polygonoideae, where the tribe Persicarieae consists of two sister genera, Bistorta and Koenigia, together with Persicaria.

- Persicarieae
  - Persicaria
  - - Bistorta
    - Koenigia

=== Species ===
As of November 2023, the following 151 species were accepted:

- Persicaria acuminata (Kunth) M.Gómez
- Persicaria akakiensis (Cufod.) Soják
- Persicaria × ambigua (Meisn.) B.Bock
- Persicaria amphibia (L.) Delarbre
- Persicaria arifolia (L.) Haraldson
- Persicaria assamica (Meisn.) Soják
- Persicaria attenuata (R.Br.) Soják
- Persicaria barbata (L.) H.Hara
- Persicaria × bicolor (Borbás) Soják
- Persicaria biconvexa (Hayata) Nemoto
- Persicaria bicornis (Raf.) Nieuwl.
- Persicaria borneensis (Meisn.) Soják
- Persicaria × brauniana (F.W.Schultz) Soják
- Persicaria breviochreata (Makino) Ohki
- Persicaria bungeana (Turcz.) Nakai
- Persicaria capitata (Buch.-Ham. ex D.Don) H.Gross
- Persicaria careyi (Olney) Greene
- Persicaria castilloi J.J.Ancona & J.J.Ortiz-Diaz
- Persicaria celebica (Danser) Soják
- Persicaria cespitosa (Blume) Nakai
- Persicaria changhuaensis H.W.Zhang & X.F.Jin
- Persicaria chinensis (L.) H.Gross
- Persicaria clivorum Seriz.
- Persicaria coccinea (Muhl. ex Willd.) Greene
- Persicaria × condensata (F.W.Schultz) Soják
- Persicaria criopolitana (Hance) Migo
- Persicaria debilis (Meisn.) H.Gross ex W.Lee
- Persicaria decipiens (R.Br.) K.L.Wilson
- Persicaria dichotoma (Blume) Masam.
- Persicaria diospyrifolia (Cham. & Schltdl.) Funez & Hassemer
- Persicaria dissitiflora (Hemsl.) H.Gross ex T.Mori
- Persicaria eciliata M.A.Hassan
- Persicaria elatior (R.Br.) Soják
- Persicaria erectominor (Makino) Nakai
- Persicaria extremiorientalis (Vorosch.) Tzvelev
- Persicaria ferruginea (Wedd.) Soják
- Persicaria × figertii (Beck) Soják
- Persicaria filiformis (Thunb.) Nakai
- Persicaria foliosa (H.Lindb.) Kitag.
- Persicaria galapagensis (Caruel) Galasso
- Persicaria geocarpica Suyama & K.Ueda
- Persicaria glabra (Willd.) M.Gómez
- Persicaria glacialis (Meisn.) H.Hara
- Persicaria glandulopilosa (De Wild.) Soják
- Persicaria glomerata (Dammer) S.Ortiz & Paiva
- Persicaria greuteriana Galasso
- Persicaria hassegawae Hanai & Seriz.
- Persicaria hastatosagittata (Makino) Nakai
- Persicaria × hervieri (Beck) Soják
- Persicaria hirsuta (Walter) Small
- Persicaria hispida (Kunth) M.Gómez
- Persicaria huananensis (A.J.Li) B.Li
- Persicaria humboldtiana Funez & Hassemer
- Persicaria humilis (Meisn.) H.Hara
- Persicaria × hybrida (Chaub. ex St.-Amans) Soják
- Persicaria hydropiper (L.) Delarbre
- Persicaria hydropiperoides (Michx.) Small
- Persicaria hystricula (J.Schust.) Soják
- Persicaria imeretina (Kom.) Soják
- Persicaria × intercedens (Beck) Soják
- Persicaria japonica (Meisn.) Nakai
- Persicaria javanica (Bruyn) Soják
- Persicaria jucunda (Meisn.) Migo
- Persicaria kawagoeana (Makino) Nakai
- Persicaria lanata (Roxb.) Tzvelev
- Persicaria lankeshanensis T.J.Liang & Bo Li
- Persicaria lapathifolia (L.) Delarbre
- Persicaria lii Kitag.
- Persicaria limbata (Meisn.) H.Hara
- Persicaria limicola (Sam.) Yonek. & H.Ohashi
- Persicaria longiflora (Courchet) Borodina
- Persicaria longiseta (Bruijn) Kitag.
- Persicaria maackiana (Regel) Nakai
- Persicaria macrantha (Meisn.) Haraldson
- Persicaria maculosa Gray
- Persicaria madagascariensis (Meisn.) S.Ortiz & Paiva
- Persicaria manshuricola Kitag.
- Persicaria meisneriana (Cham. & Schltdl.) M.Gómez
- Persicaria microcephala (D.Don) H.Gross
- Persicaria mikawana Hanai & Seriz.
- Persicaria minor (Huds.) Opiz
- Persicaria mitis (Schrank) Assenov
- Persicaria muricata (Meisn.) Nemoto
- Persicaria × musashinoensis Hiyama
- Persicaria nakaii (H.Hara) Cubey
- Persicaria nataliae Stepanov
- Persicaria neofiliformis (Nakai) Ohki
- Persicaria nepalensis (Meisn.) H.Gross
- Persicaria nogueirae S.Ortiz & Paiva
- Persicaria obtusifolia (Täckh. & Boulos) Greuter & Burdet
- Persicaria odorata (Lour.) Soják
- Persicaria orientalis (L.) Spach
- Persicaria palmae J.J.Ancona & J.J.Ortiz-Diaz
- Persicaria palmata (Dunn) Yonek. & H.Ohashi
- Persicaria paradoxa (H.Lév.) Kantachot
- Persicaria paraguayensis (Wedd.) S.T.Kim & Donoghue
- Persicaria paralimicola (A.J.Li) B.Li
- Persicaria pensylvanica (L.) M.Gómez
- Persicaria perfoliata (L.) H.Gross
- Persicaria peruviana (Meisn.) Soják
- Persicaria pilushanensis (Y.C.Liu & C.H.Ou) C.F.Kuo ex T.C.Hsu & S.W.Chung
- Persicaria pinetorum (Hemsl.) H.Gross
- Persicaria poiretii (Meisn.) K.L.Wilson
- Persicaria posumbu (Buch.-Ham. ex D.Don) H.Gross
- Persicaria praetermissa (Hook.f.) H.Hara
- Persicaria pringlei (Small) J.J.Ancona & J.J.Ortiz-Diaz
- Persicaria prostrata (R.Br.) Soják
- Persicaria × pseudoincana (Klokov) Doweld
- Persicaria × pseudolapathum (Schur) D.H.Kent
- Persicaria pubescens (Blume) H.Hara
- Persicaria pulchra Soják
- Persicaria punctata (Elliott) Small
- Persicaria puritanorum (Fernald) Soják
- Persicaria robustior (Small) E.P.Bicknell
- Persicaria rotunda (Z.Z.Zhou & Q.Y.Sun) Bo Li
- Persicaria rubricaulis (Cham.) Galasso
- Persicaria runcinata (Buch.-Ham. ex D.Don) H.Gross
- Persicaria sagittata (L.) H.Gross
- Persicaria sagittifolia H.Gross
- Persicaria segetum (Kunth) Small
- Persicaria senegalensis (Meisn.) Soják
- Persicaria senticosa (Meisn.) H.Gross
- Persicaria setacea (Baldwin) Small
- Persicaria setosula (A.Rich.) K.L.Wilson
- Persicaria sinica Migo
- Persicaria sinuata (Royle ex Bab.) H.Gross
- Persicaria snobarii Munshi & Javeid
- Persicaria stagnina (Buch.-Ham. ex Meisn.) M.A.Hassan
- Persicaria stelligera (Cham.) Galasso
- Persicaria strigosa (R.Br.) H.Gross
- Persicaria strindbergii (J.Schust.) Galasso
- Persicaria subsessilis (R.Br.) K.L.Wilson
- Persicaria subterranea Bo Li
- Persicaria sylvestris Funez & Hassemer
- Persicaria taitoinsularis (Masam.) Yonek.
- Persicaria taquetii (H.Lév.) Koidz.
- Persicaria thunbergii (Siebold & Zucc.) H.Gross
- Persicaria tinctoria (Aiton) Spach
- Persicaria tirathgarhensis K.C.Mohan
- Persicaria tomentosa (Schrank) E.P.Bicknell
- Persicaria trigonocarpa (Makino) Nakai
- Persicaria tuminensis Czubarj
- Persicaria umbrosa (Sam.) Galasso
- Persicaria veracruzana J.J.Ancona & J.J.Ortiz-Diaz
- Persicaria virginiana (L.) Gaertn.
- Persicaria viscofera (Makino) H.Gross
- Persicaria viscosa (Buch.-Ham. ex D.Don) H.Gross ex T.Mori
- Persicaria wellensii (De Wild.) Soják
- Persicaria × wilmsii (Beck) Soják
- Persicaria wugongshanensis Bo Li
- Persicaria zhenaiguoi Bo Li

== General and cited references ==
- Schuster, Tanja M.; Reveal, James L.; Bayly, Michael J. & Kron, Kathleen A. (2015). "An updated molecular phylogeny of Polygonoideae (Polygonaceae): Relationships of Oxygonum, Pteroxygonum, and Rumex, and a new circumscription of Koenigia". Taxon. 64 (6): 1188–1208. Bibcode:2015Taxon..64.1188S. doi:10.12705/646.5.
