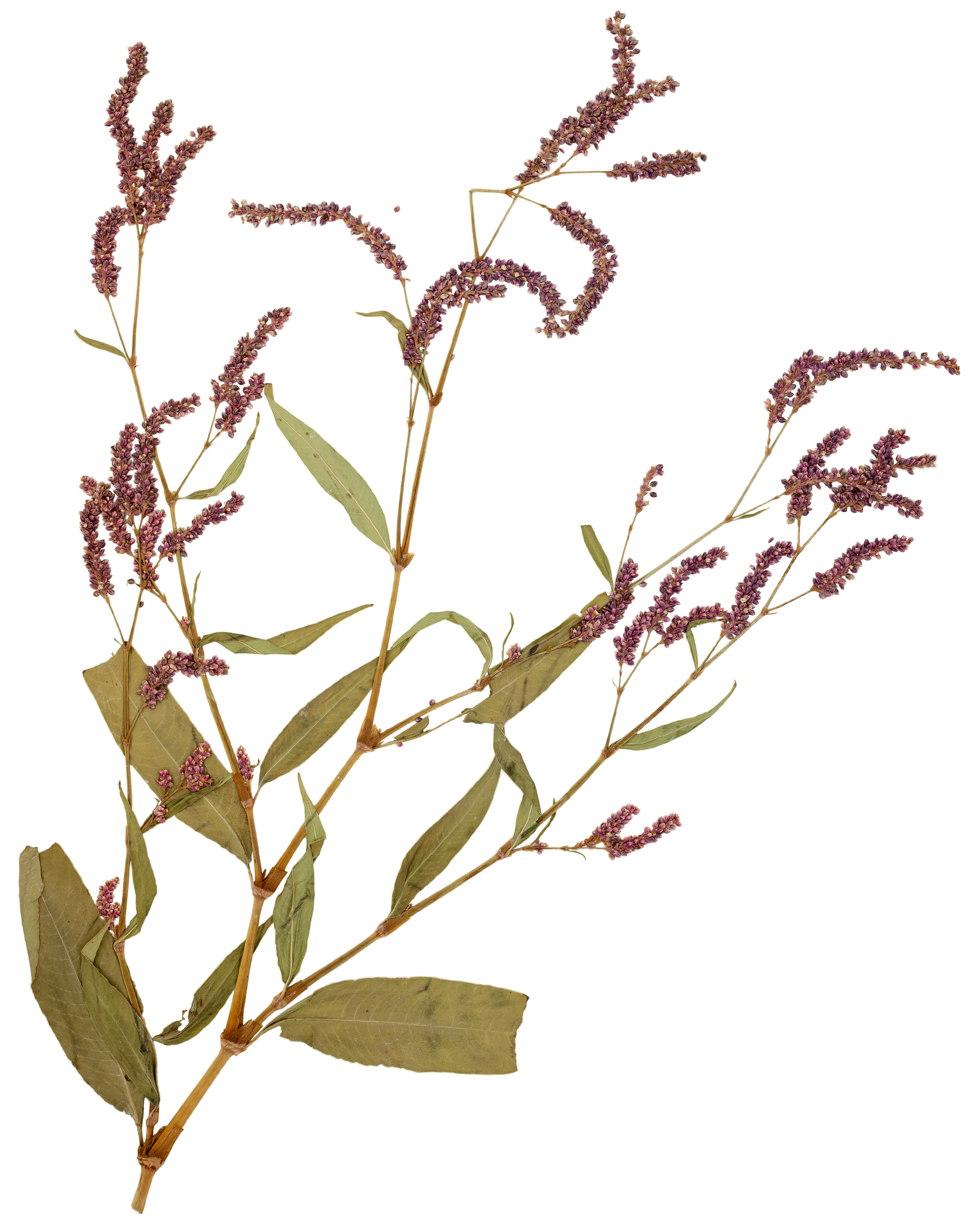

Scientific classification
- Kingdom: Plantae
- Clade: Tracheophytes
- Clade: Angiosperms
- Clade: Eudicots
- Order: Caryophyllales
- Family: Polygonaceae
- Genus: Persicaria
- Species: P. extremiorientalis

Binomial name
- Persicaria extremiorientalis (Vorosch.) Tzvelev

= Persicaria extremiorientalis =

Species of plant

Persicaria extremiorientalis, the east Asian smartweed, is a plant species in the buckwheat family, native to Japan, China, Korea, and far eastern Russia and introduced to the eastern United States where it is found from North Carolina to Massachusetts.
