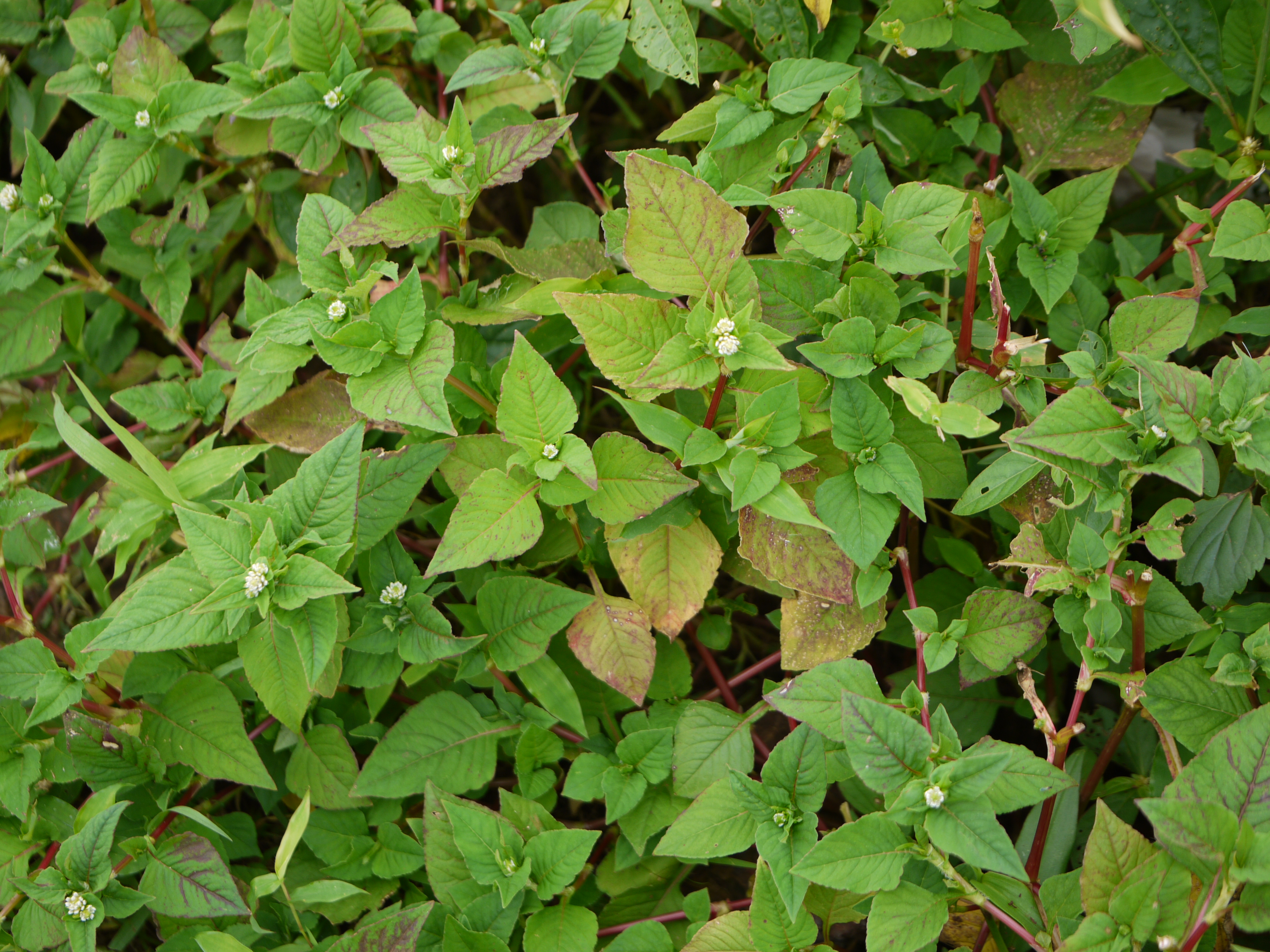

Scientific classification
- Kingdom: Plantae
- Clade: Tracheophytes
- Clade: Angiosperms
- Clade: Eudicots
- Order: Caryophyllales
- Family: Polygonaceae
- Genus: Persicaria
- Species: P. nepalensis

Binomial name
- Persicaria nepalensis (Meisn.) H.Gross

Synonyms
- Cephalophilon nepalense (Meisn.) Tzvelev; Persicaria alata (D.Don) Nakai; Persicaria lyrata (Nakai) Nakai; Persicaria perforata (Meisn.) H.Gross; Polygonum alatum (D.Don) Buch.-Ham. ex Spreng.; Polygonum guttuliferum Miq. ex Meisn.; Polygonum lyratum Nakai; Polygonum nepalense Meisn.; Polygonum perforatum Meisn.

= Persicaria nepalensis =

Species of plant

Persicaria nepalensis is a species of flowering plant in the family Polygonaceae, native to eastern Africa, including Madagascar, and parts of Asia. It has been introduced elsewhere: parts of Europe (including Great Britain), North America (including British Columbia, Connecticut, Massachusetts, New York and Pennsylvania) and northern South America. The species was first described as Polygonum nepalense by Carl Meissner in 1826, and transferred to Persicaria by Hugo Gross in 1913. (The same transfer was made later, in 1934, by Kingo Miyabe; as of 3 May 2019, Plants of the World Online used this transfer for the authorship of the combination.)

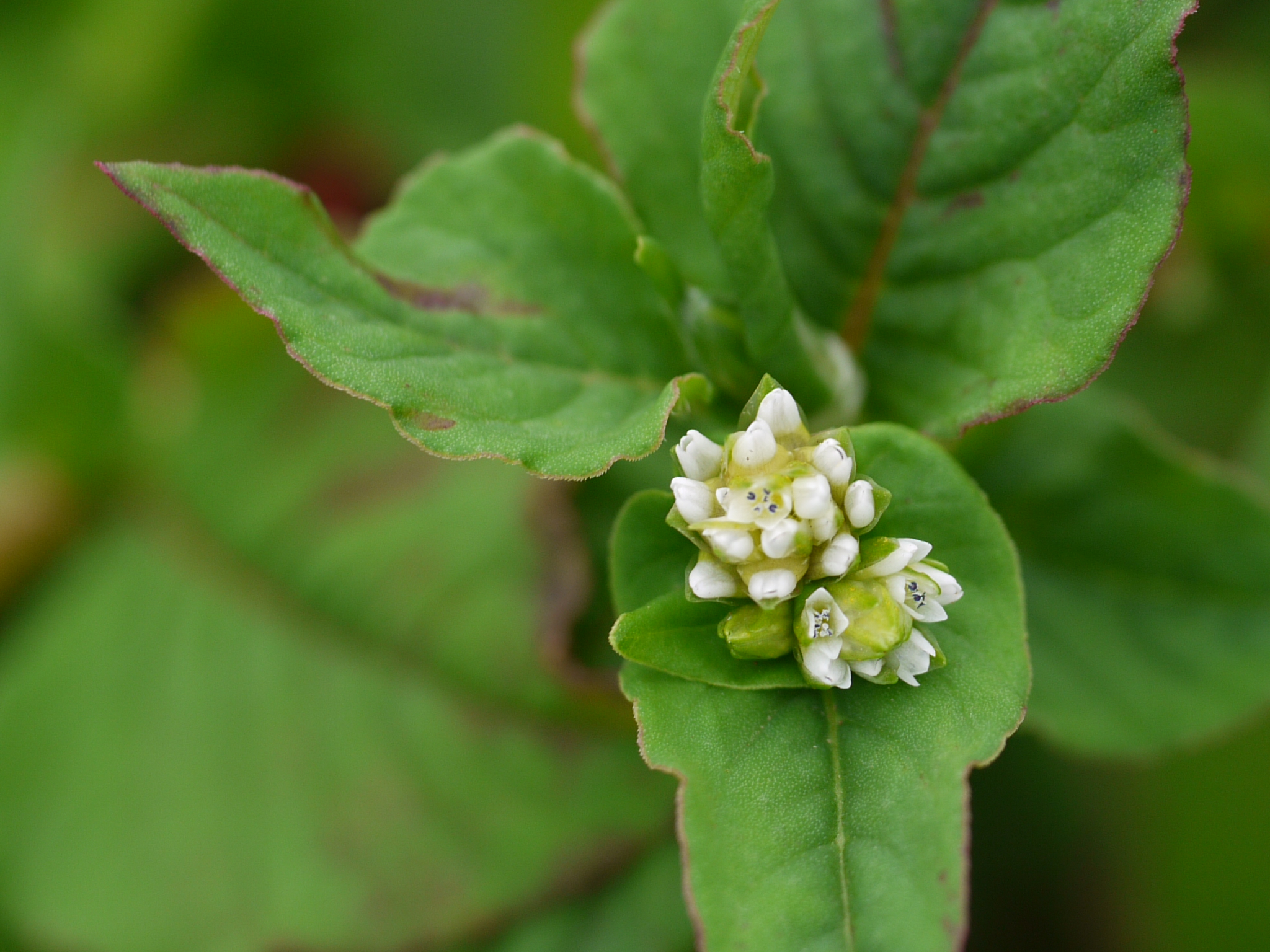
White flowers

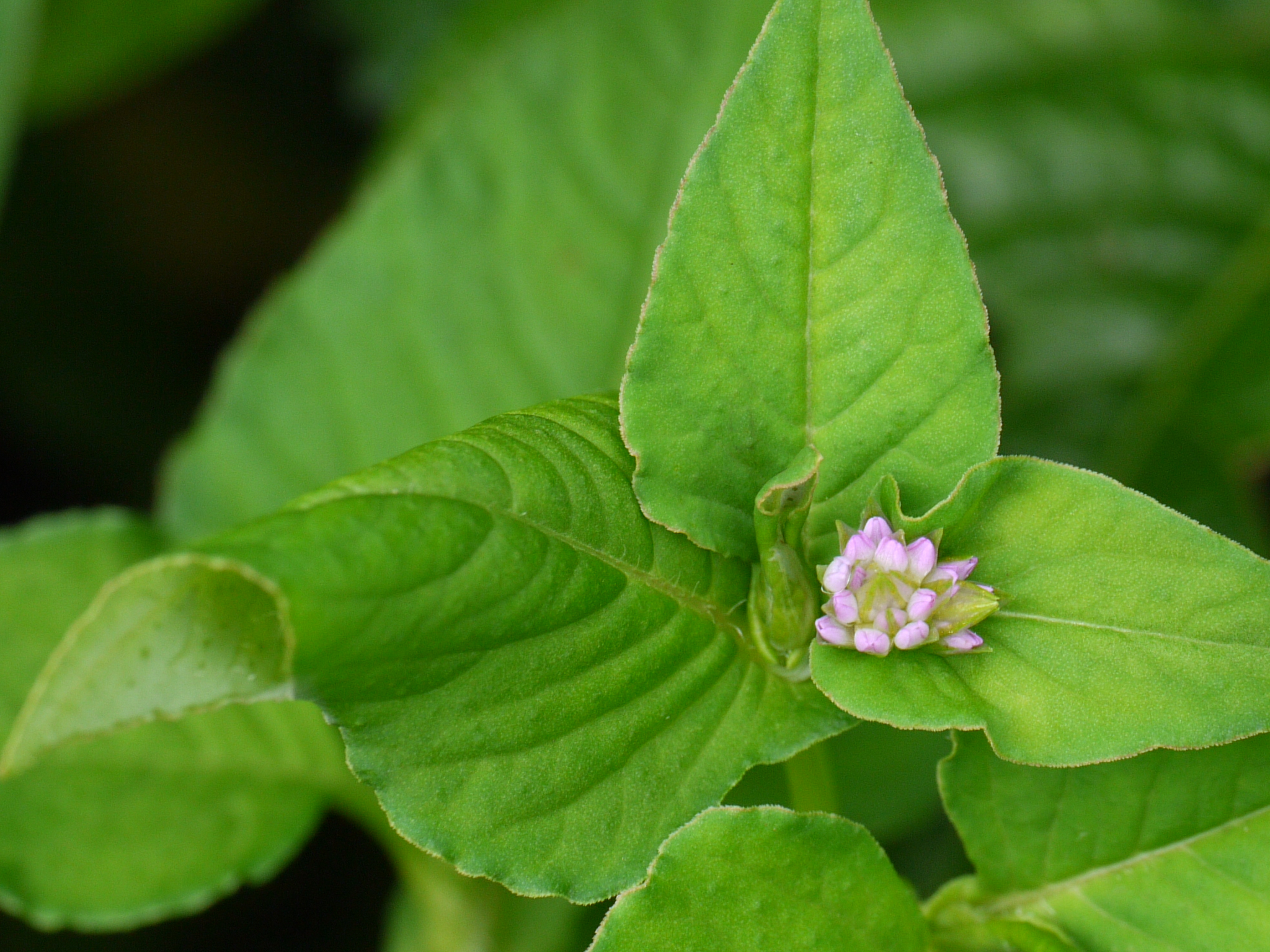
Pink flowers
