= Persicaria bungeana =

Scientific classification
- Kingdom: Plantae
- Clade: Tracheophytes
- Clade: Angiosperms
- Clade: Eudicots
- Order: Caryophyllales
- Family: Polygonaceae
- Genus: Persicaria
- Species: P. bungeana

Binomial name
- Persicaria bungeana (Turcz.) Nakai

Species of plant

Persicaria bungeana is a herbaceous annual, flowering plant species in the family Polygonaceae. Commonly known as prickly smartweed or Bunge's smartweed, it is a weed found in soybean fields of the Mid-Western United States of America.

== Description ==
Prickly smartweed is a small, herbaceous plant which ranges in 0.3-0.8 meters tall. It contains a pale green with red tint perianth on its uninterrupted inflorescences. The blades are lancelet to narrow elliptic, ranging from 0.05-0.125 meters in length and 0.015-0.035 in width. There are eight (8) stamen with two (2) styles and pink anthers.

== Distribution ==
Persicaria bungeana originates in China, Japan, Manchuria, and Korea. It is an introduced species of cultivated fields in Illinois, Minnesota, and Iowa.

== Uses ==
Prickly smartweed is found as a weed in soybean fields of Illinois, Minnesota, and Iowa. It is reported as an invasive species of the United States, but it is unknown when the species was introduced to the United States. Recently, it has been reported as an invasive species in Aitkin and Blue Earth Counties of Missouri.

== Disparities ==
Persicaria bungeana was first identified by Nikolai Turczaninow and further identified by Takenoshin Nakai in 1922. By this credit, Persicaria bungeana is an annual herb. However, Polygonum bungeana was credited first as a perennial herb by Nikolai Turczaninow in 1840. The difference in flowering identifies the difference between the two species. However, the two species are synonymous which is why there is a difference in their common names--Prickly smartweed and Bunge's smartweed. Bunge's smartweed refers to Turczaninow's original identification in 1840 while prickly smartweed is in reference to the accepted name of the species which was identified by Nakai.
