= Persicaria bicornis =

Scientific classification
- Kingdom: Plantae
- Clade: Tracheophytes
- Clade: Angiosperms
- Clade: Eudicots
- Order: Caryophyllales
- Family: Polygonaceae
- Genus: Persicaria
- Species: P. bicornis

Binomial name
- Persicaria bicornis (Raf.) Nieuwl.

Synonyms
- Dioctis bicorne; Persicaria longistyla; Polygonum bicorne; Polygonum longistylum

Plant species in the family

Persicaria bicornis is a North American species of flowering plant in the buckwheat family (Polygonaceae). The common name is pink smartweed. It is native to the central and southwestern United States from northern Texas west to Arizona, east to Louisiana, and north as far as eastern Wyoming, South Dakota, Iowa, and Illinois.

== Description ==
Persicaria bicornis is an annual herb that grows up to 180 cm (5.9 ft) tall. It has lanceolate leaves up to 18 cm (7 in) long and groups of small pink flowers with 5 pink tepals. Its pink flowers contain 6-8 stamens with pink or red anthers. These flowers contain 1 compound pistil with 2-3 styles coming out of the base of the flower. The blooms appear to be fringed, and its heterostylous flowers are positioned very closely together. Persicaria bicornis has leaf blades that are more narrow than P. pensylvanica, which helps to distinguish the two.

== Taxonomy ==
In 1817 Constantine Samuel Rafinesque published the scientific name Polygonum bicorne. In 1914 this species was reclassified from Polygonum to Persicaria by Julius Nieuwland, with the species name slightly modified to Persicaria bicornis. Along with the rest of its genus it is part of the Polygonaceae family and has four synonyms.

Table of Synonyms
Name	Year	Notes
Dioctis bicorne (Raf.) Raf.	1837	≡ hom.
Persicaria longistyla (Small) Small	1903	= het.
Polygonum bicorne Raf.	1817	≡ hom.
Polygonum longistylum Small	1894	= het.
Notes: ≡ homotypic synonym; = heterotypic synonym

== Distribution and habitat ==
This species can be found in North America: Arkansas, Colorado, Illinois, Louisiana, Missouri, and Texas amongst other places. It can be found in disturbed places such as moist ditches, and on the shorelines of ponds and reservoirs. Persicaria bicornis typically grows from June to October.

== Uses ==
There are currently no known human uses for this particular species.
