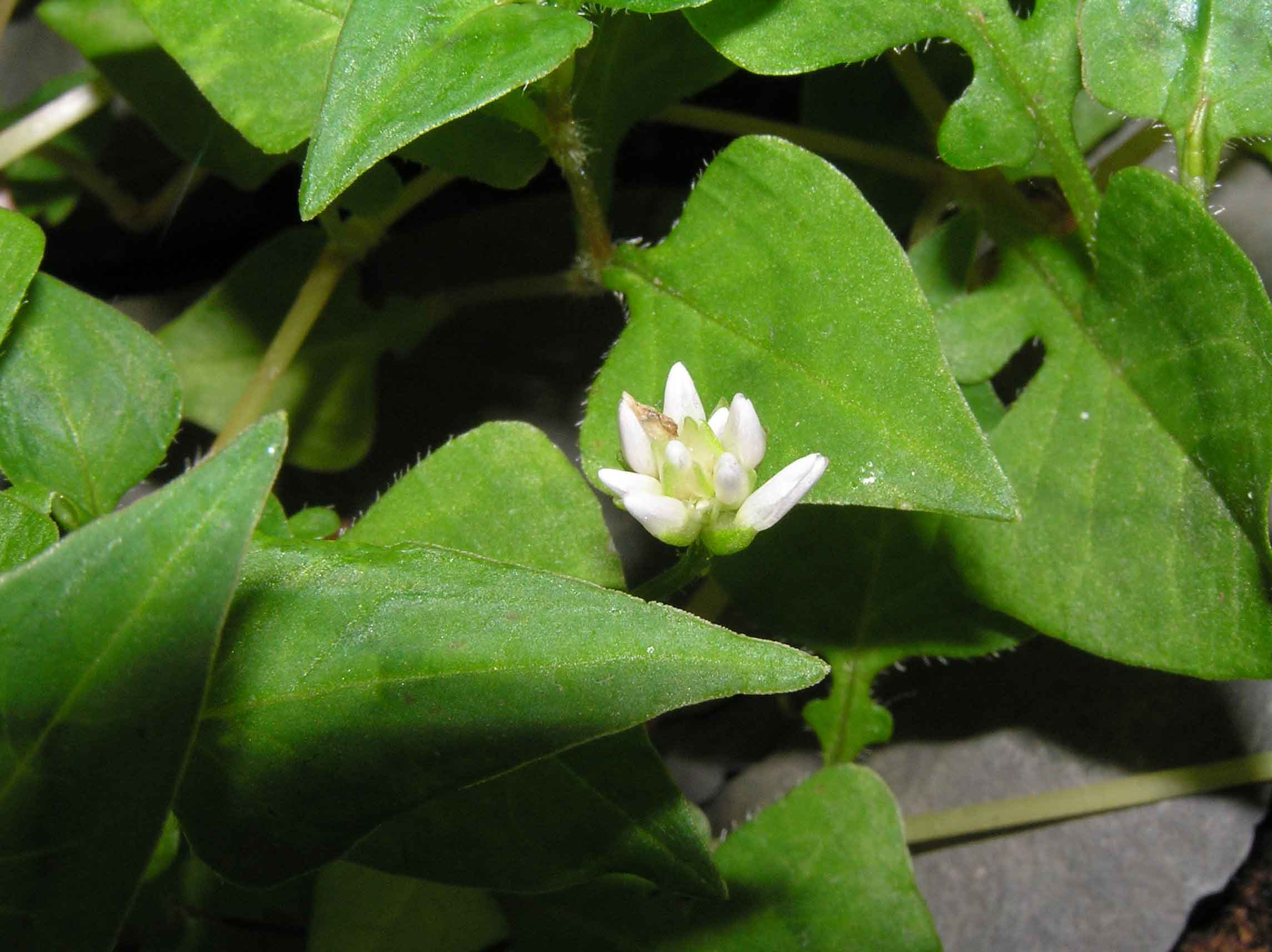

Scientific classification
- Kingdom: Plantae
- Clade: Tracheophytes
- Clade: Angiosperms
- Clade: Eudicots
- Order: Caryophyllales
- Family: Polygonaceae
- Genus: Persicaria
- Species: P. runcinata

Binomial name
- Persicaria runcinata (Buch.-Ham. ex D.Don) H.Gross

Synonyms
- Cephalophilon runcinatum (Buch.-Ham.) Tzvelev; Polygonum runcinatum Buch.-Ham.

= Persicaria runcinata =

Species of plant

Persicaria runcinata is a species of flowering plant in the family Polygonaceae, native from the Himalayas east through mainland China to Taiwan and south to Java and the Philippines. It was first described in 1825 as Polygonum runcinata.
