= Persicaria dichotoma =

Conservation status
- Least Concern (IUCN 3.1)

Scientific classification
- Kingdom: Plantae
- Clade: Tracheophytes
- Clade: Angiosperms
- Clade: Eudicots
- Order: Caryophyllales
- Family: Polygonaceae
- Genus: Persicaria
- Species: P. dichotoma

Binomial name
- Persicaria dichotoma (Blume) Masam.

Species of plant

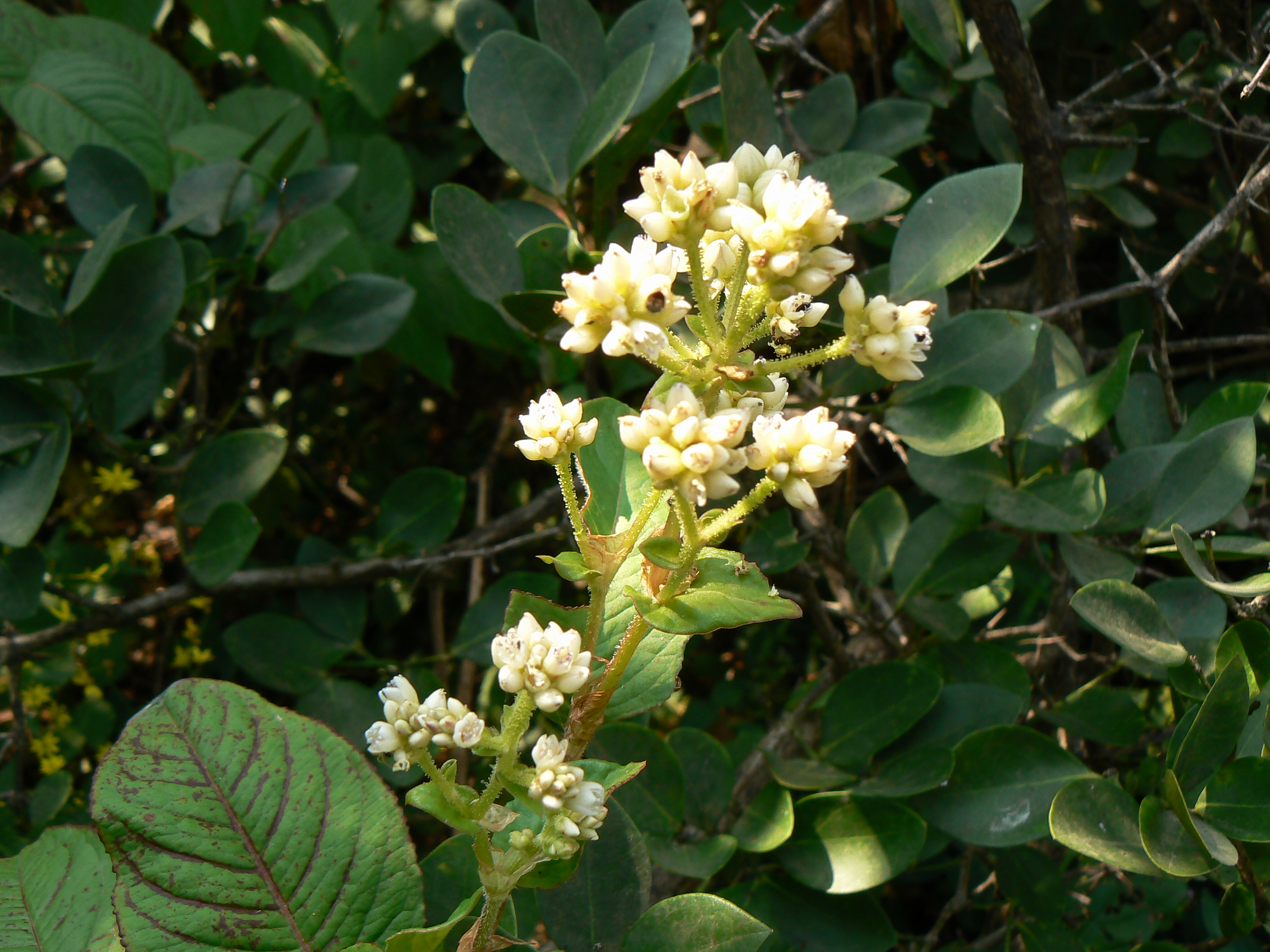

Persicaria dichotoma is a species of flowering plant native to Australia and Asia.
