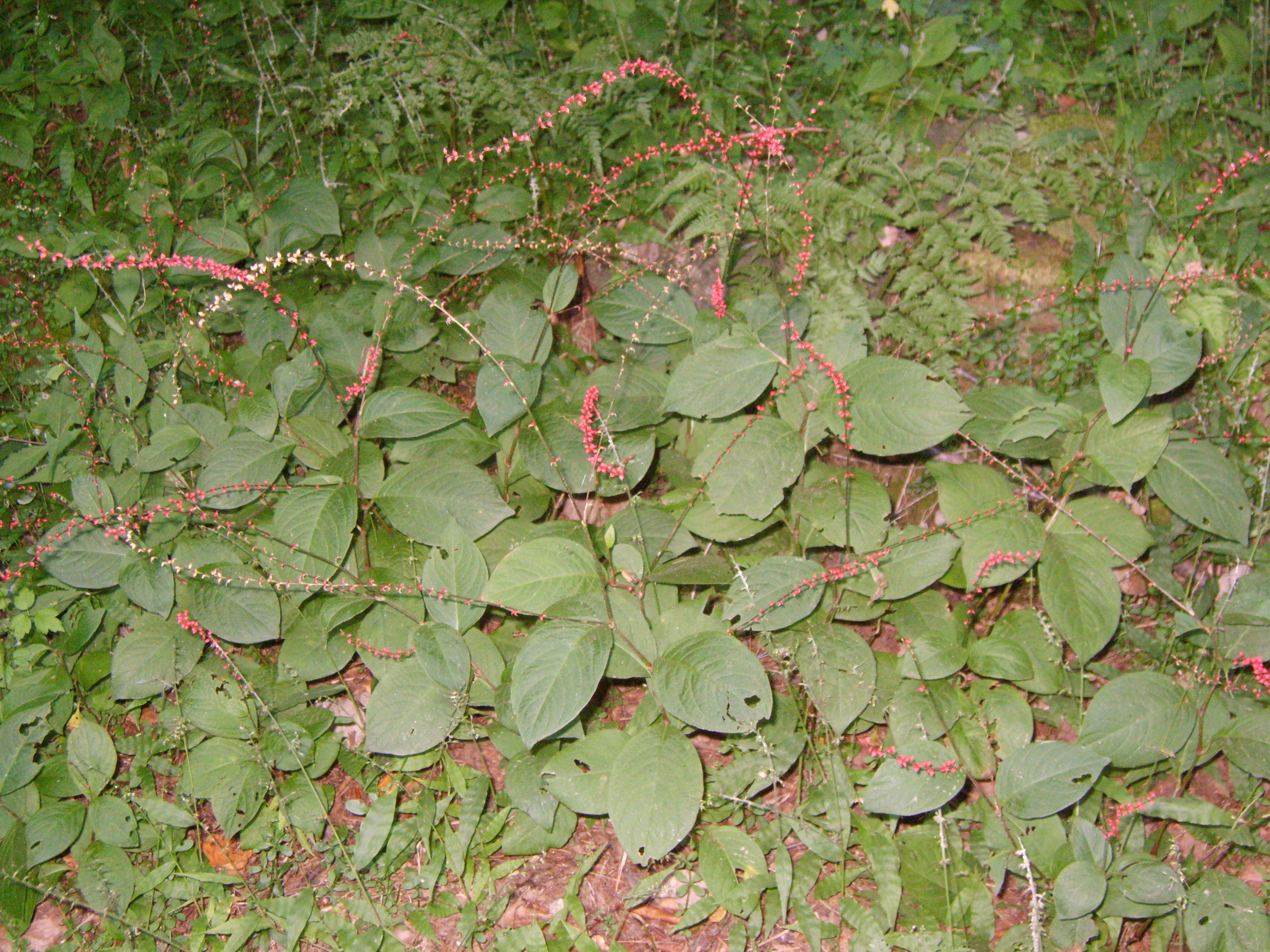
- In Korea

Scientific classification
- Kingdom: Plantae
- Clade: Tracheophytes
- Clade: Angiosperms
- Clade: Eudicots
- Order: Caryophyllales
- Family: Polygonaceae
- Genus: Persicaria
- Species: P. filiformis

Binomial name
- Persicaria filiformis (Thunb.) Nakai

Synonyms
- Antenoron filiforme (Thunb.) Roberty & Vautier; Persicaria virginiana var. filiformis (Thunb.) J.M.H.Shaw; Polygonum apoense Elmer; Polygonum filiforme Thunb.; Sunania filiformis (Thunb.) Raf.; Tovara apoensis (Elmer) H.L.Li; Tovara filiformis (Thunb.) Nakai; Tovara ryukuyuensis Masam.; Tovara smaragdina Nakai ex F.Maek.

= Persicaria filiformis =

Species of plant

Persicaria filiformis is a species of flowering plant in the family Polygonaceae, native to the Kuril Islands, Japan (including the Ryukyu Islands), Korea, Myanmar, the Philippines and Vietnam. It was first described as Polygonum filiforme in 1784 by Carl Thunberg and transferred to the genus Persicaria in 1819 by Takenoshin Nakai. The species has been treated as the variety filiformis of Persicaria virginiana, a North American species. The leaves are light green, eliptical, and about 15 cm (5.9 in) long. They are commonly (but not always) marked with a pair of brown spots near the center of the leaf.

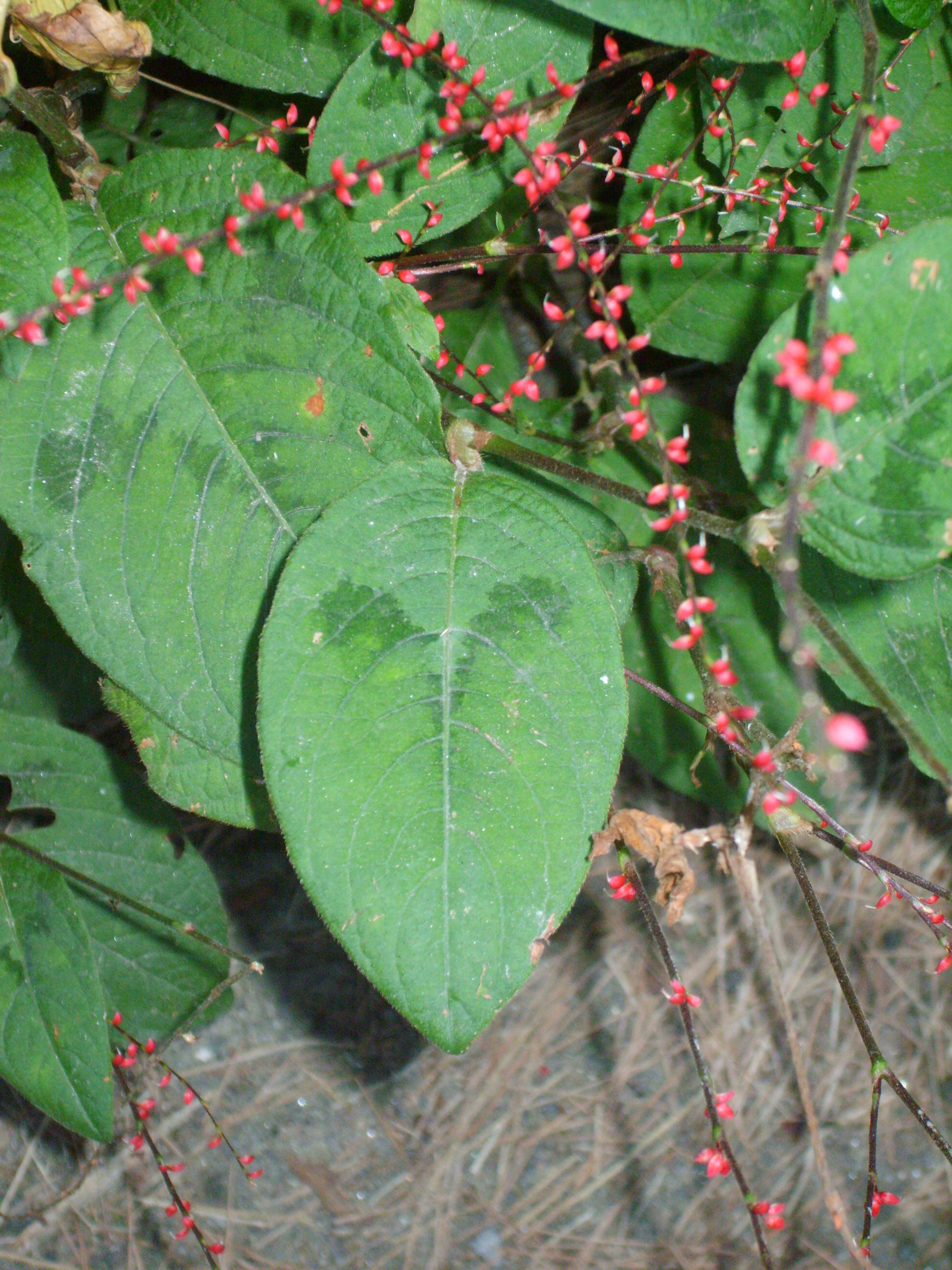
Form with marked leaves
