= Persicaria foliosa =

Scientific classification
- Kingdom: Plantae
- Clade: Tracheophytes
- Clade: Angiosperms
- Clade: Eudicots
- Order: Caryophyllales
- Family: Polygonaceae
- Genus: Persicaria
- Species: P. foliosa

Binomial name
- Persicaria foliosa (H.Lindb.) Kitag.

Species of flowering plant

Persicaria foliosa is a species of flowering plant belonging to the family Polygonaceae.

Its native range is Northern and Northeastern Europe to Japan.
