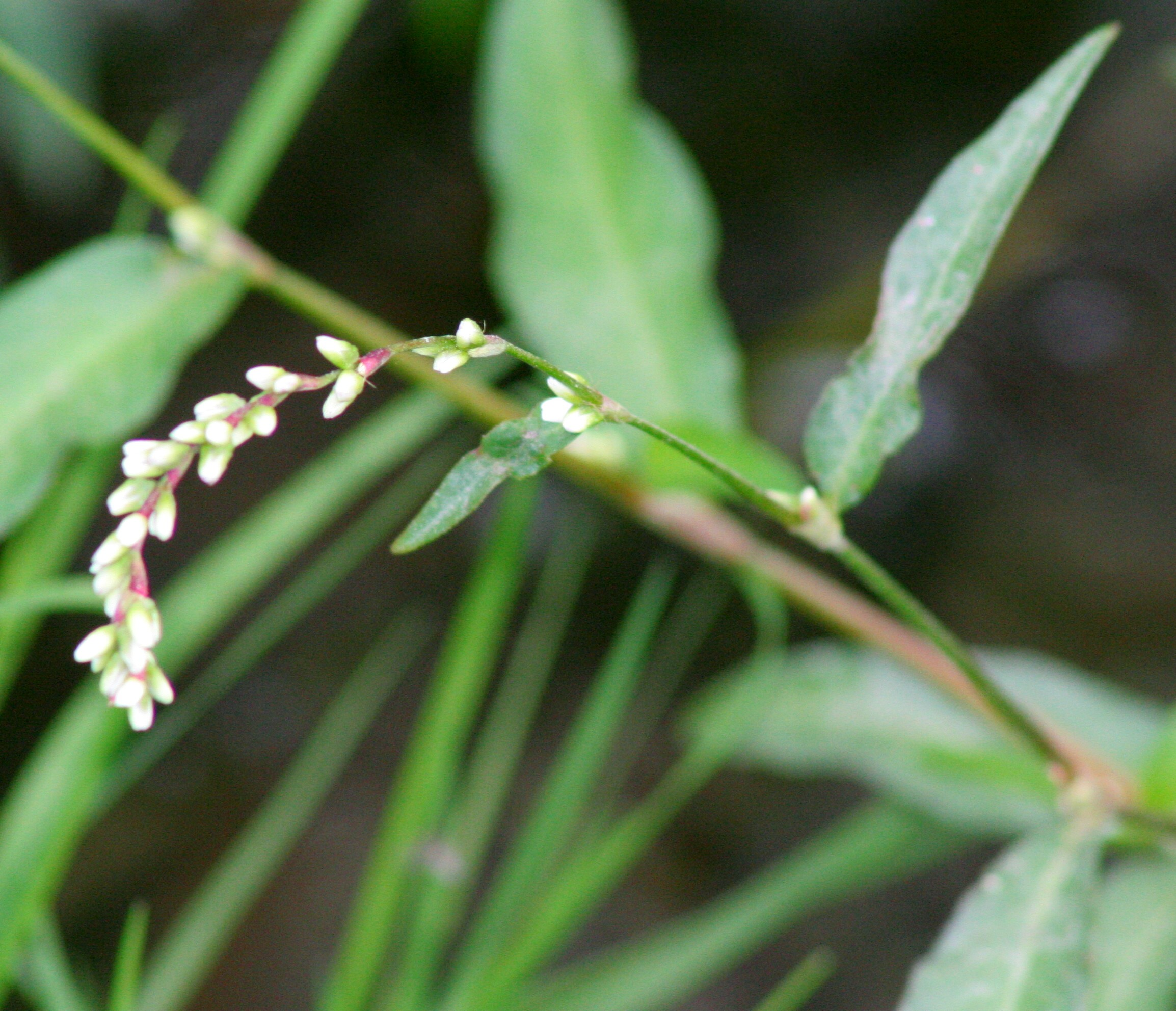

Scientific classification
- Kingdom: Plantae
- Clade: Tracheophytes
- Clade: Angiosperms
- Clade: Eudicots
- Order: Caryophyllales
- Family: Polygonaceae
- Genus: Persicaria
- Species: P. mitis

Binomial name
- Persicaria mitis (Schrank) Assenov (nom. cons.)

Synonyms
- Persicaria dubia (Stein ex A.Braun) Fourr.; Persicaria laxiflora (Weihe) Opiz; Polygonum dubium Stein ex A.Braun; Polygonum laxiflorum Weihe; Polygonum mite Schrank

= Persicaria mitis =

Species of plant

Persicaria mitis (Schrank) Assenov is a species of flowering plant in the family Polygonaceae, native to Europe. (Persicaria mitis Delarbre is a different species, being a rejected synonym of Persicaria maculosa.)

== Taxonomy ==
The species was first described by Franz von Paula Schrank in 1789 as Polygonum mite. In 1966, Vulevi Ivan Assenov transferred it to Persicaria under the name "Persicaria mitis". However, this name had already been used in 1800 by Antoine Delarbre as a replacement name for Carl Linnaeus's Polygonum persicaria when this species was transferred to Persicaria (the International Code of Nomenclature for algae, fungi, and plants does not allow the same genus name and specific epithet, so it could not be called "Persicaria persicaria"). This would make Persicaria mitis (Schrank) Assenov an illegitimate name; however it has been conserved.
