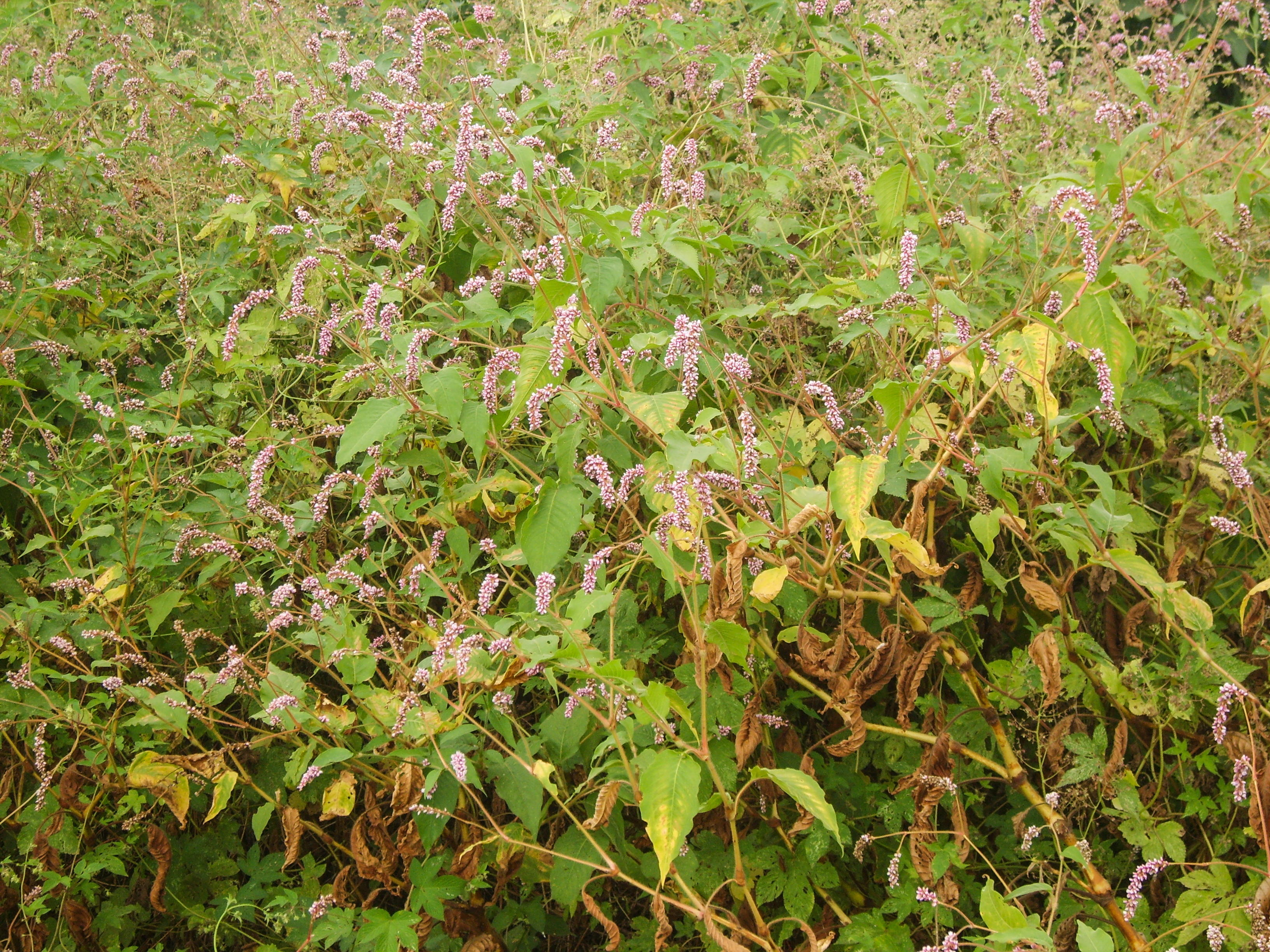
- In Korea

Scientific classification
- Kingdom: Plantae
- Clade: Tracheophytes
- Clade: Angiosperms
- Clade: Eudicots
- Order: Caryophyllales
- Family: Polygonaceae
- Genus: Persicaria
- Species: P. orientalis

Binomial name
- Persicaria orientalis (L.) Spach

Synonyms
- Amblygonum orientale (L.) Nakai; Goniaticum solitarium Stokes; Heptarina orientalis (L.) Raf.; Lagunea cochinchinensis Lour.; Lagunea orientalis (L.) Nakai; Persicaria cochinchinensis (Lour.) Kitag.; Polygonum amoenum Blume; Polygonum cochinchinense (Lour.) Meisn.; Polygonum orientale L.; Polygonum pilosum Roxb. ex Wall.; Polygonum spaethii Dammer; Polygonum torquatum Bruyn; Reynoutria spaethii (Dammer) Moldenke

= Persicaria orientalis =

Species of plant

Persicaria orientalis is a species of flowering plant in the family Polygonaceae, known as kiss-me-over-the-garden-gate and princess-feather. It was first described, as Polygonum orientale, by Carl Linnaeus in 1753. It was transferred to the genus Persicaria by Édouard Spach in 1841. Its native distribution is unclear. As of April 2023, Kew's Plants of The World Online lists its native distribution as ranging from the Russian far east to Indochina, Malesia and Australia. It is widely cultivated and naturalized.

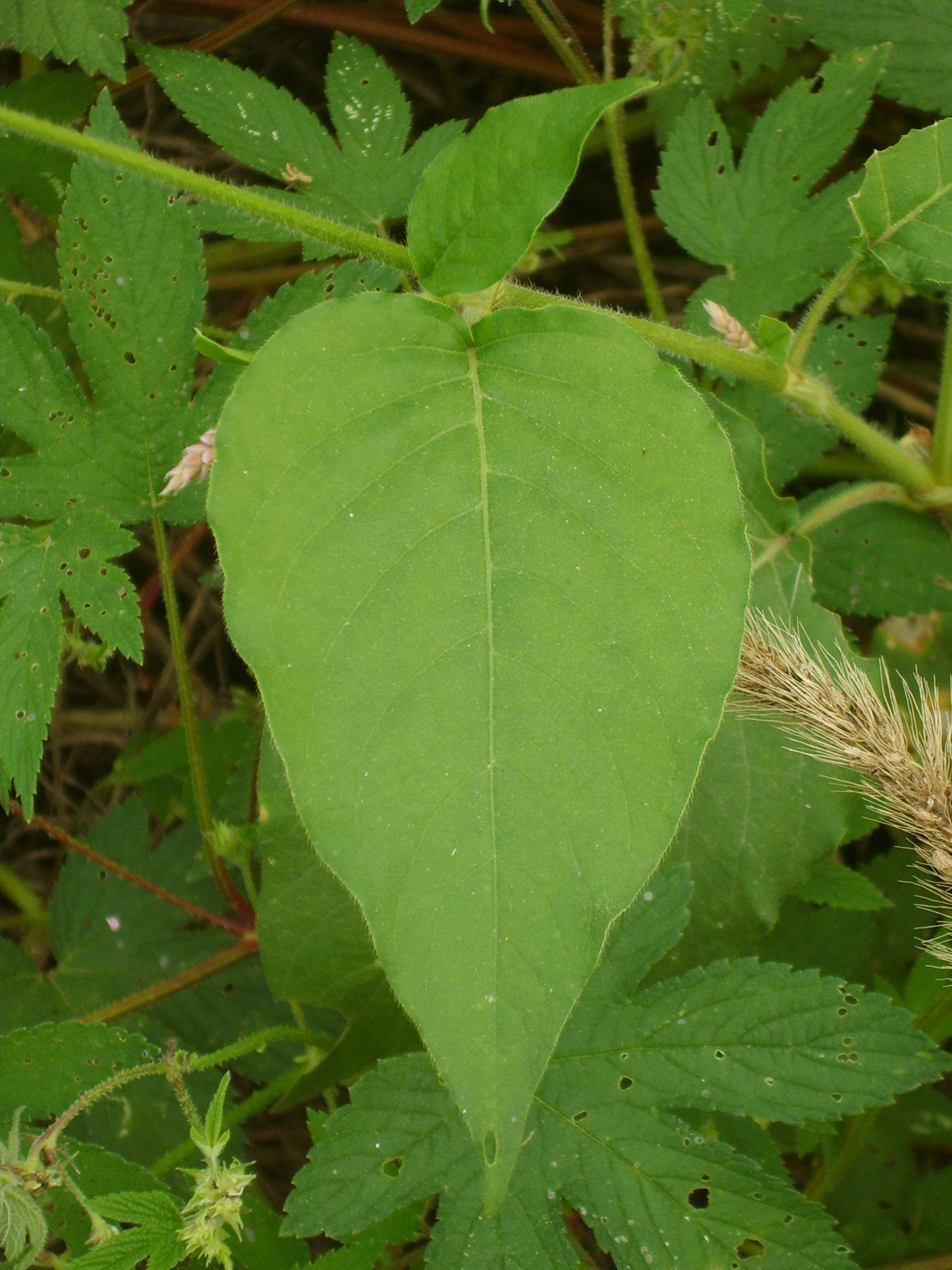
Leaf

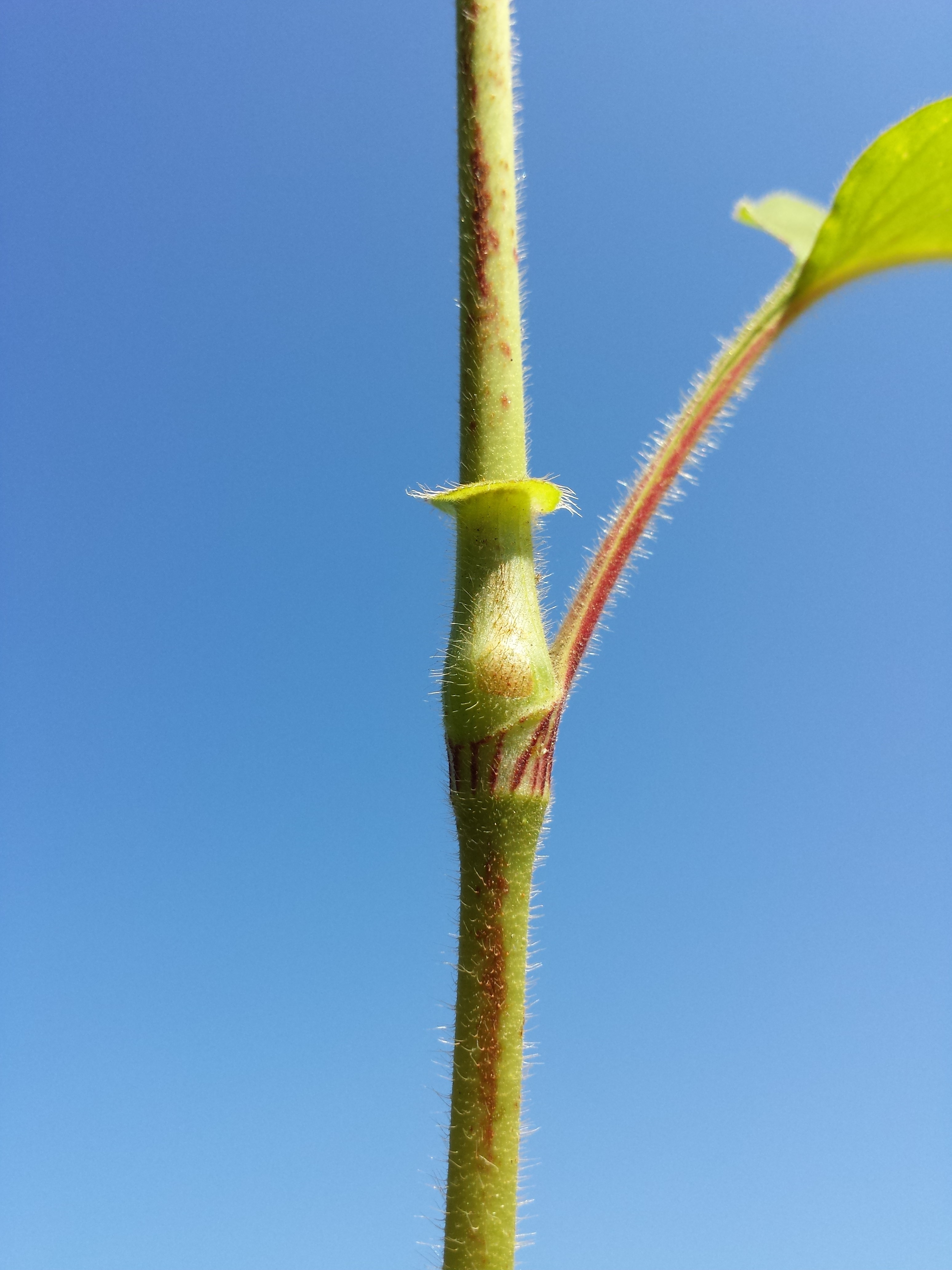
Stem with ochrea (sheath)

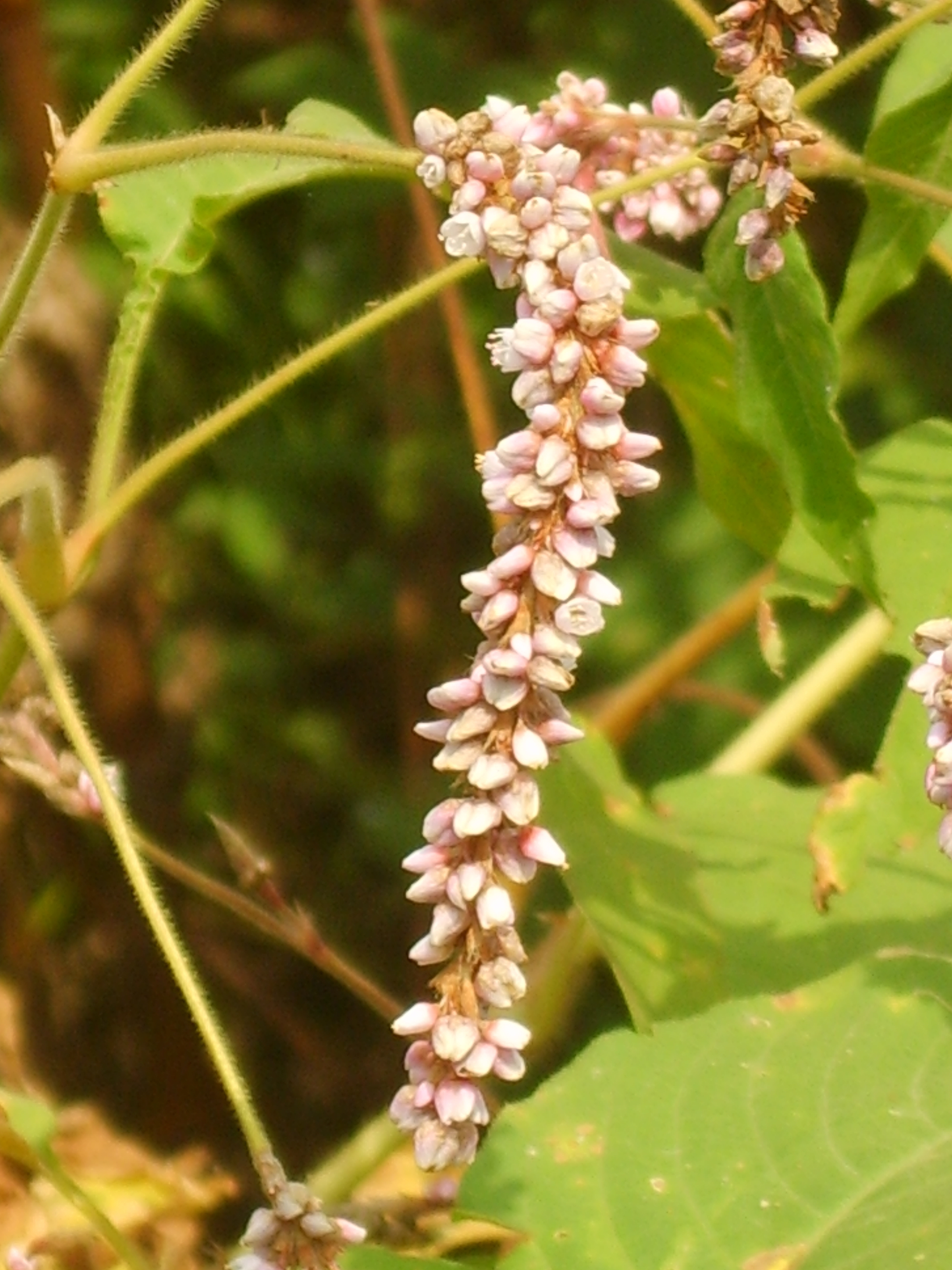
Inflorescence

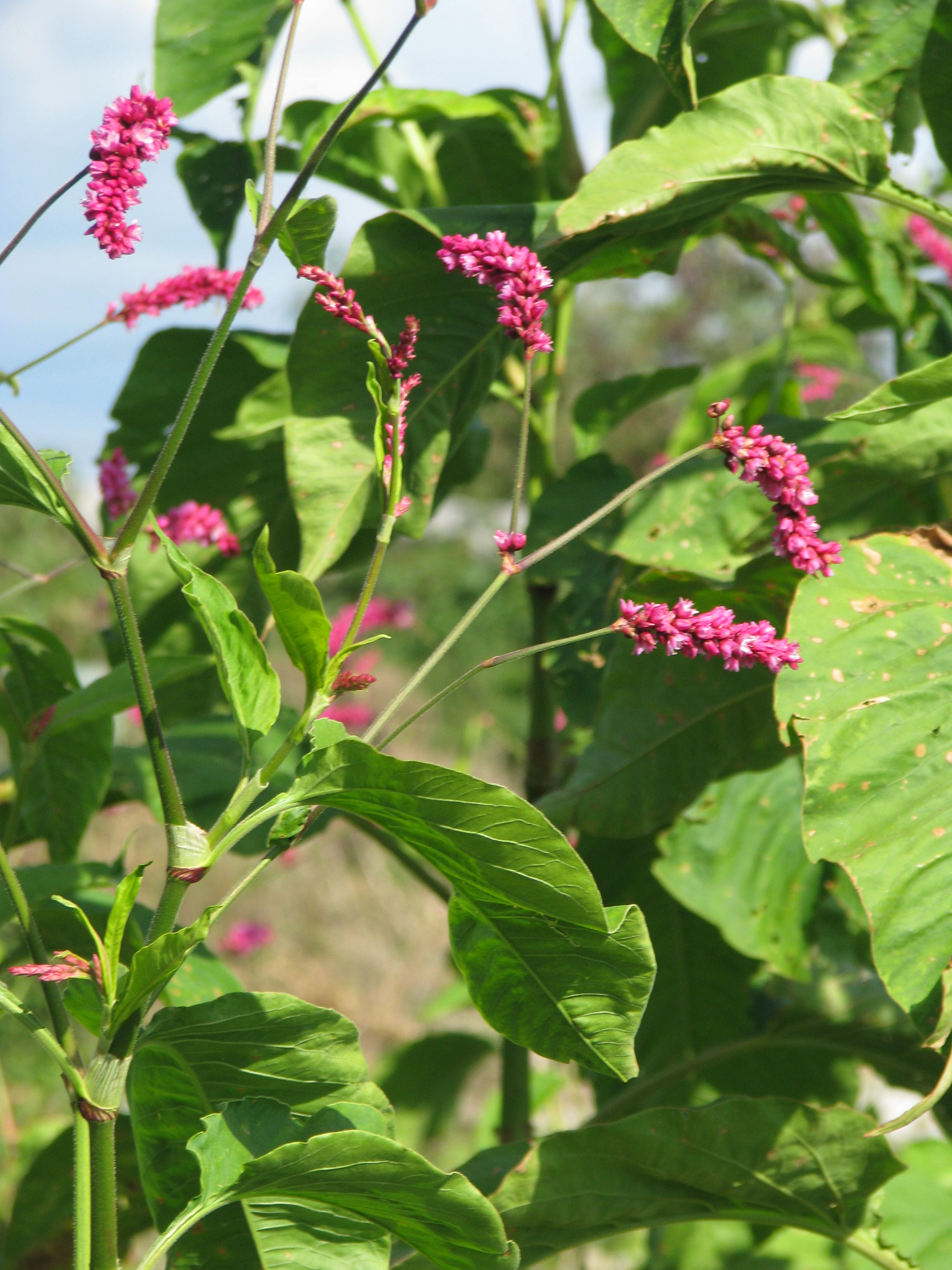
In cultivation in England
