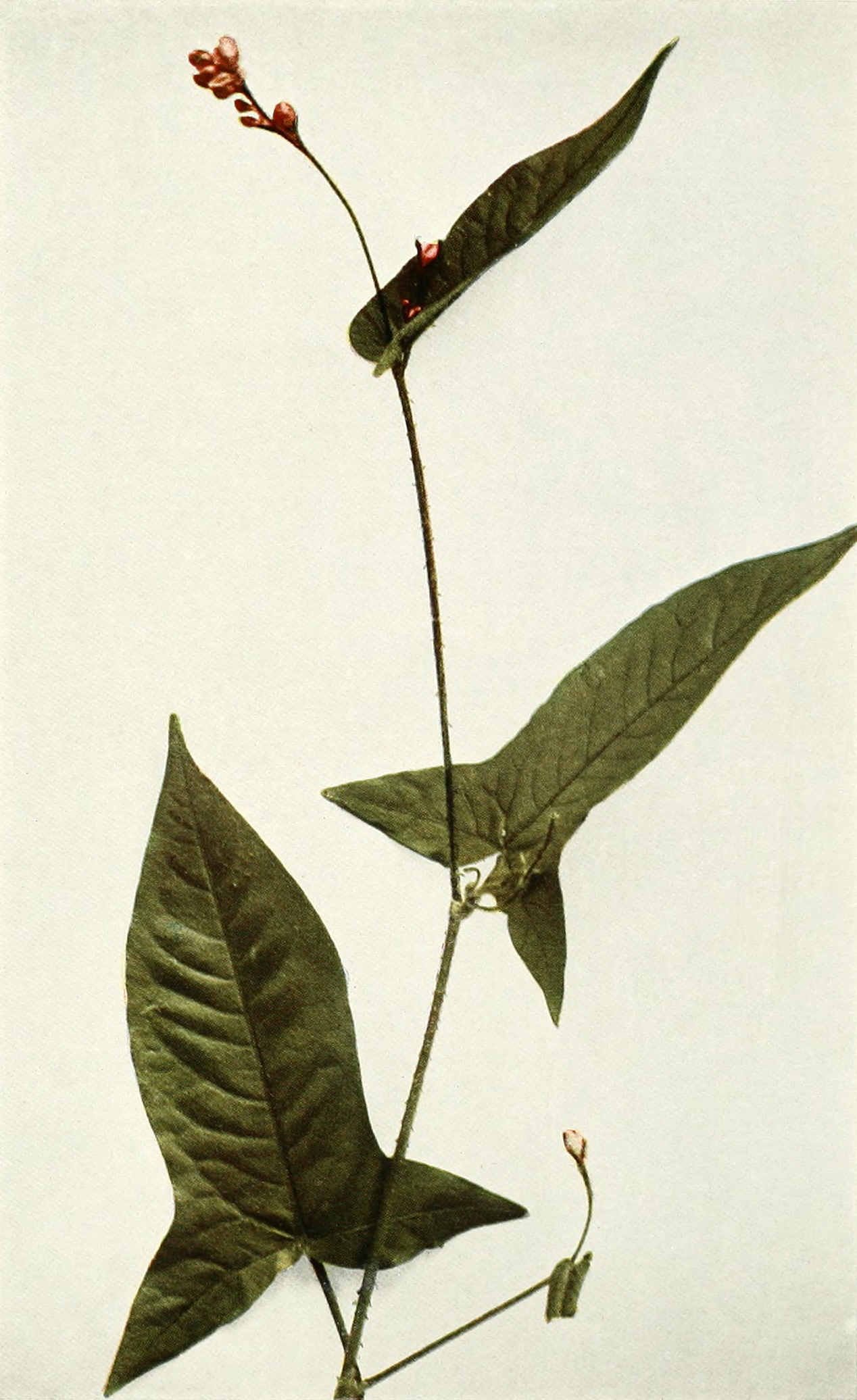

Scientific classification
- Kingdom: Plantae
- Clade: Tracheophytes
- Clade: Angiosperms
- Clade: Eudicots
- Order: Caryophyllales
- Family: Polygonaceae
- Genus: Persicaria
- Species: P. arifolia

Binomial name
- Persicaria arifolia (L.) Haraldson

= Persicaria arifolia =

Species of plant

Persicaria arifolia is a flowering plant species in the family Polygonaceae. Commonly called Halberd-leaf tearthumb, Persicaria arifolia is found in high concentrations in the midwest and northeast United states predominantly. It grows in damp areas usually close to bodies of water such as; ponds, rivers, and marshes.

== Description ==
Persicaria arifolia was originally described by Charles Linneas in 1753. The plant is annual and it flowers between the summer and the fall. Once flowers bloom, they have a pink and white appearance. At maturity, Persicaria arifolia grows to be 2-4 feet tall. The common name of Halberd-leaf tearthumb is because of the small thorns on the stem of the plant that can cut into the skin.

== Distribution ==
Persicaria arifolia can be found in many places across North America. The plant can be found along the Eastern side of the United States and Canada; ranging from as south as Georgia to as north as Quebec. Persicaria arifolia can also be found in high concentrations in the midwest region of the United States. The plant can be found near marshes and brushy areas.

== Uses ==
There are no known uses for Persicaria arifolia.
