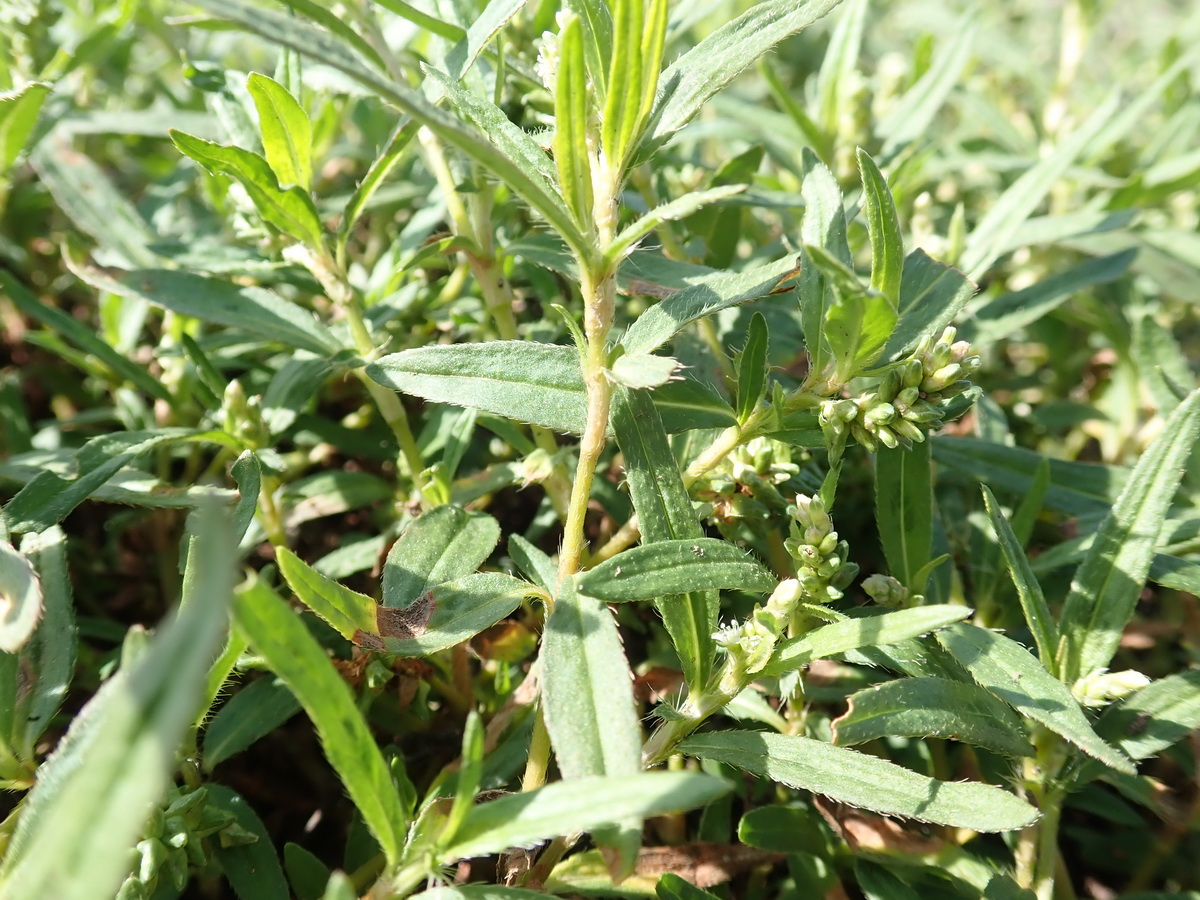

Scientific classification
- Kingdom: Plantae
- Clade: Tracheophytes
- Clade: Angiosperms
- Clade: Eudicots
- Order: Caryophyllales
- Family: Polygonaceae
- Genus: Persicaria
- Species: P. prostrata

Binomial name
- Persicaria prostrata (R.Br.) Soják
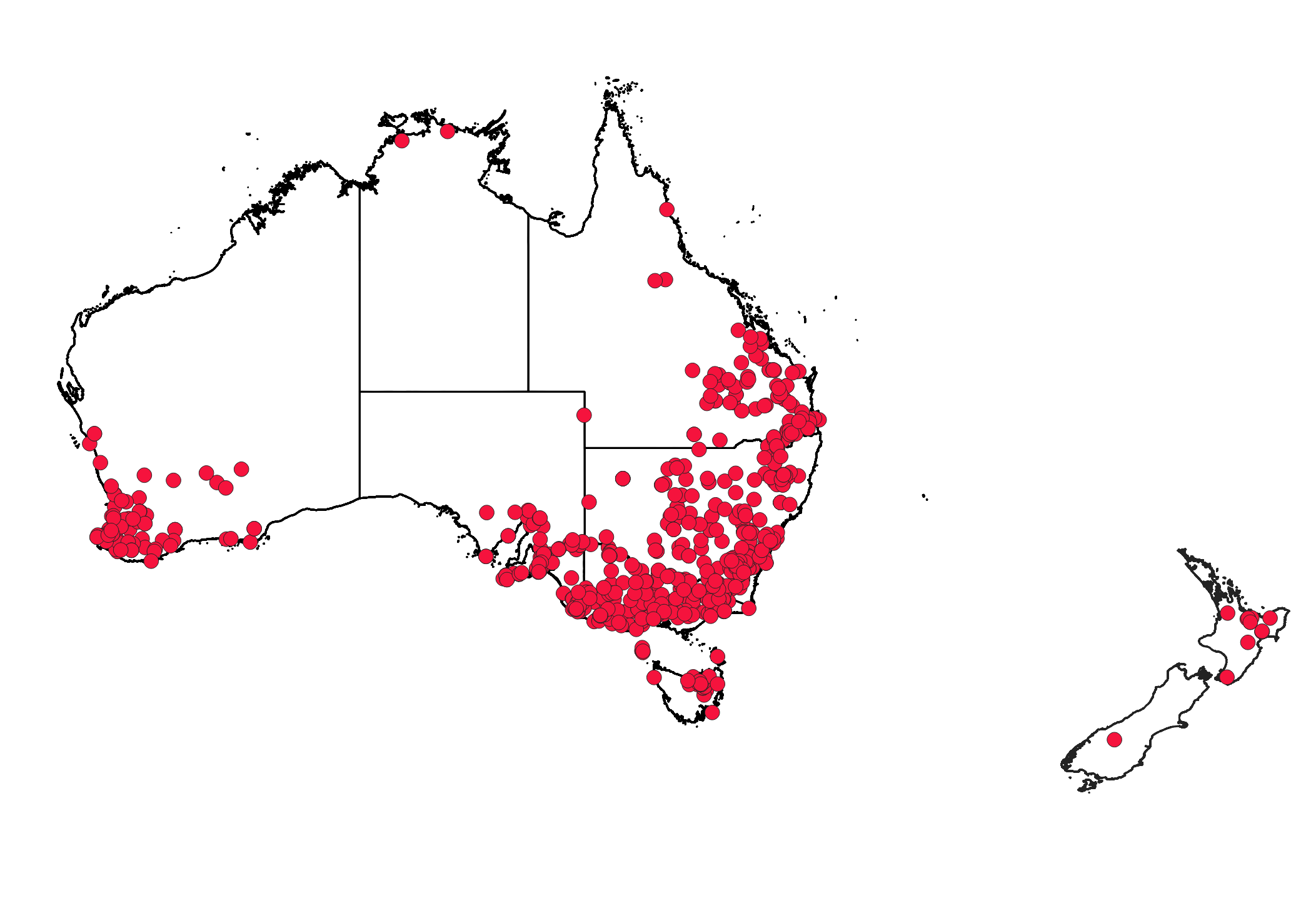
- Occurrence data from AVH

Synonyms
- Polygonum prostratum R.Br.

= Persicaria prostrata =

Species of plant

Persicaria prostrata, basionym Polygonum prostratum, is a species of flowering plant in the family Polygonaceae, native to Australia and perhaps New Zealand. It is known by the common name of creeping knotweed.

== Description ==
Decumbent perennial herb with stems up to about 40 cm long. Leaves lanceolate to narrowly elliptic, 1–5 cm long, 3–10 mm wide with short hairs on the margins and main veins. Ochreas lobed with hairs 1–2 mm long. Compact short cylindrical flower spikes from 0.6–4 cm long and 4–7 mm diameter.

== Ecology ==
Persicaria prostrata grows on banks of streams, ground-tanks and ditches and on heavy soils in areas prone to inundation.

== Taxonomy ==
The plant was first described in 1810 by Robert Brown as Polygonum prostratum, but was assigned to the genus Persicaria by Jiří Soják in 1974.

== Gallery ==
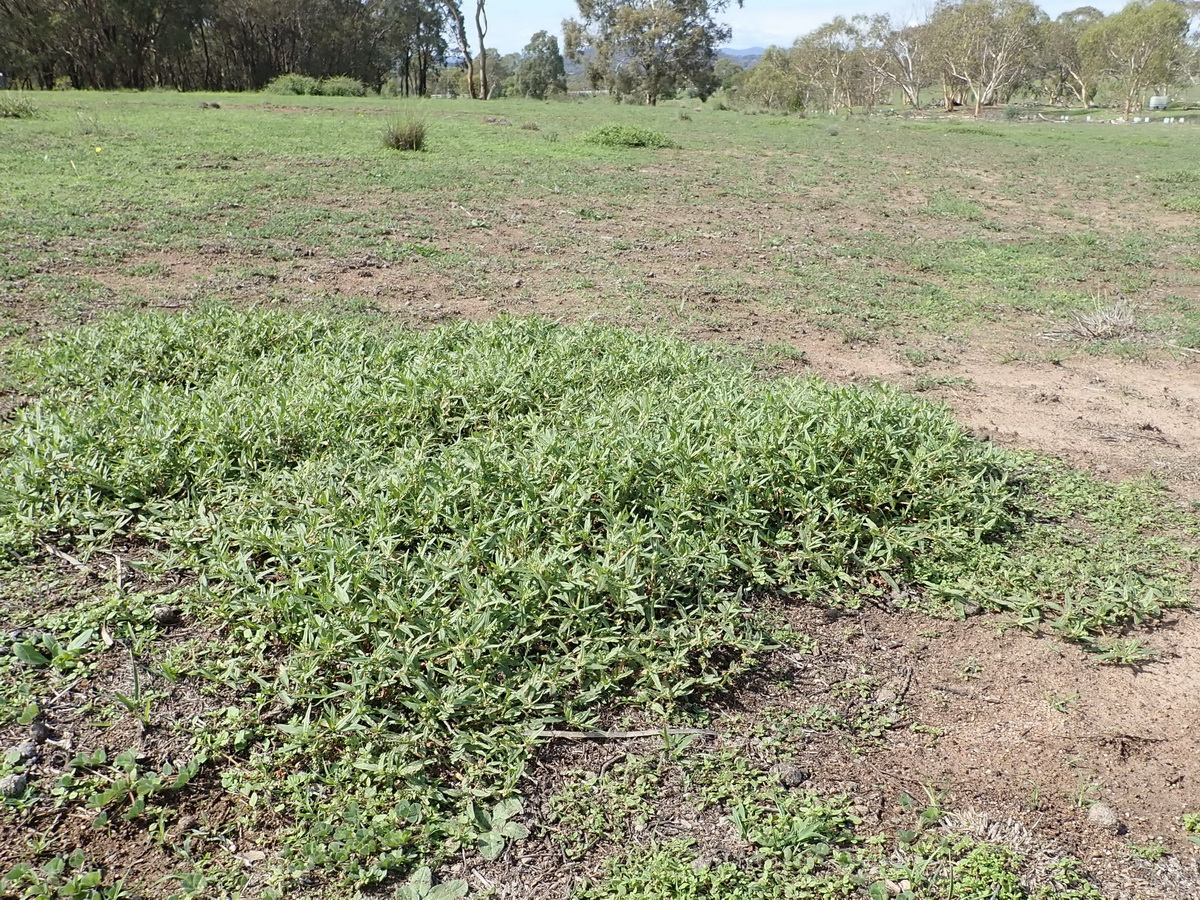
Habitat

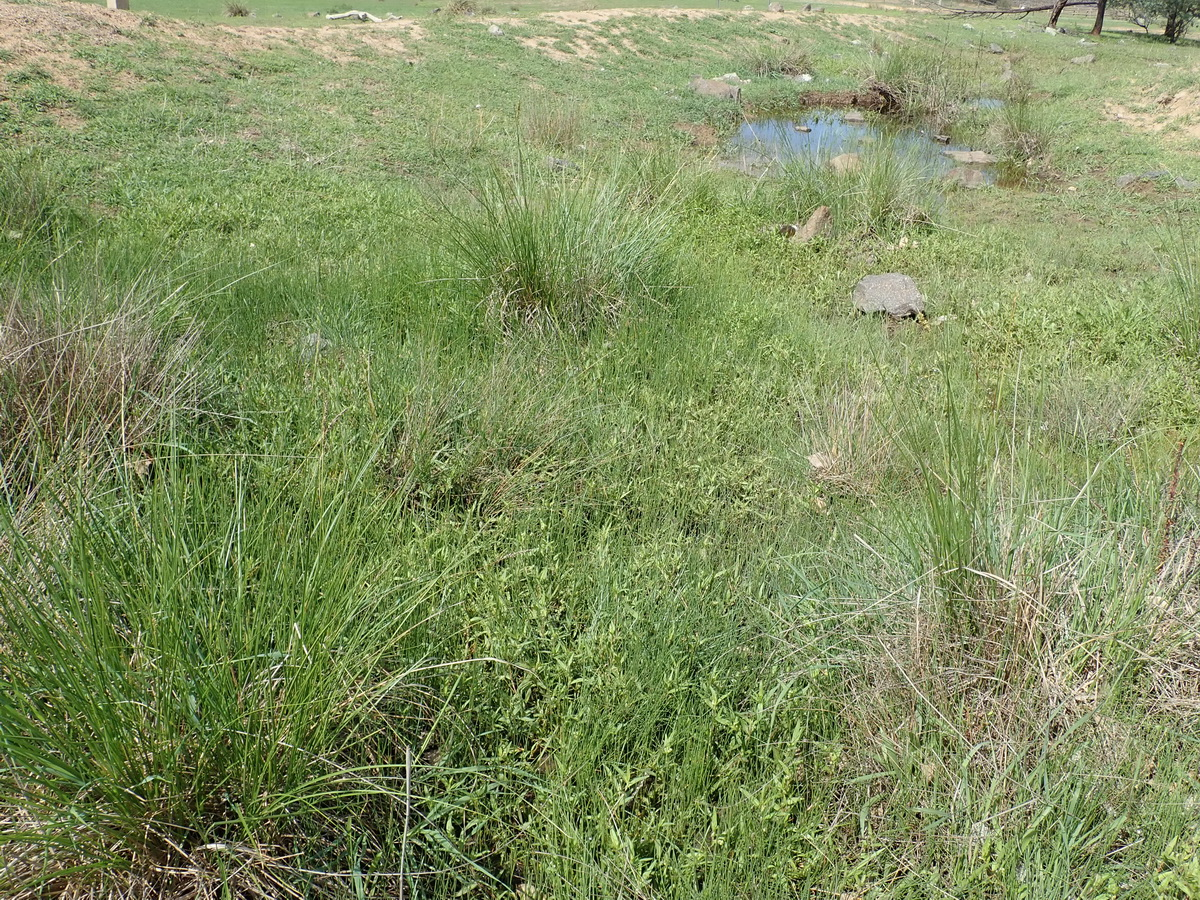
Habitat

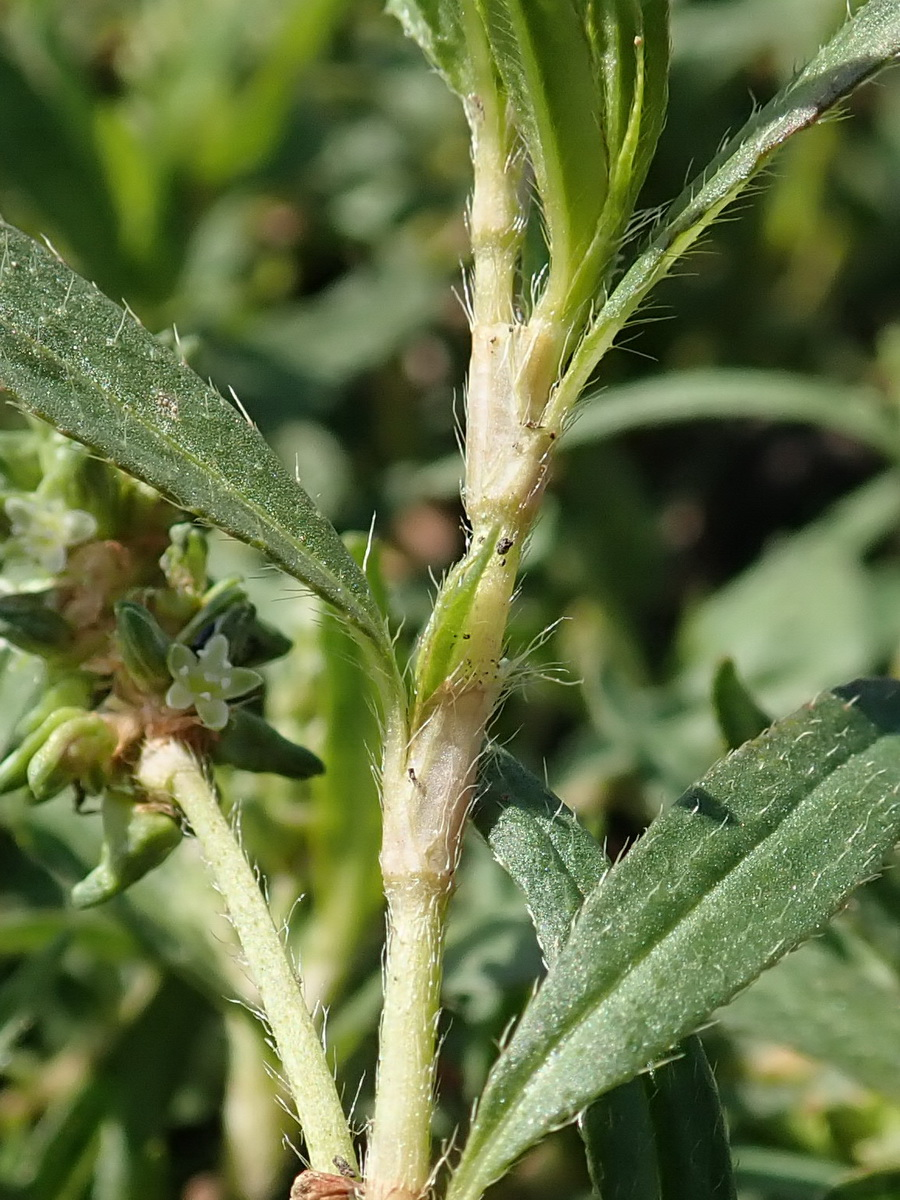
Detail of leaves and ochreas

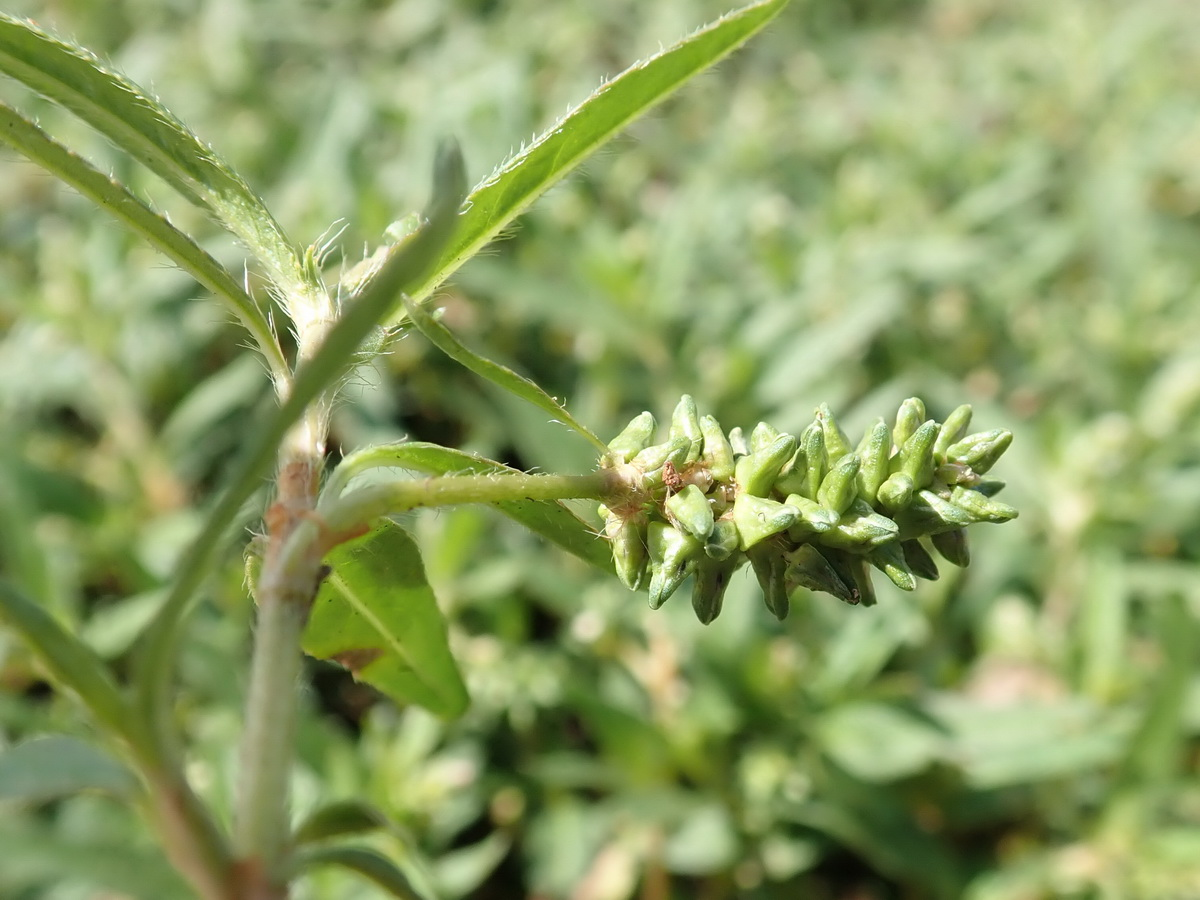
Flower spike

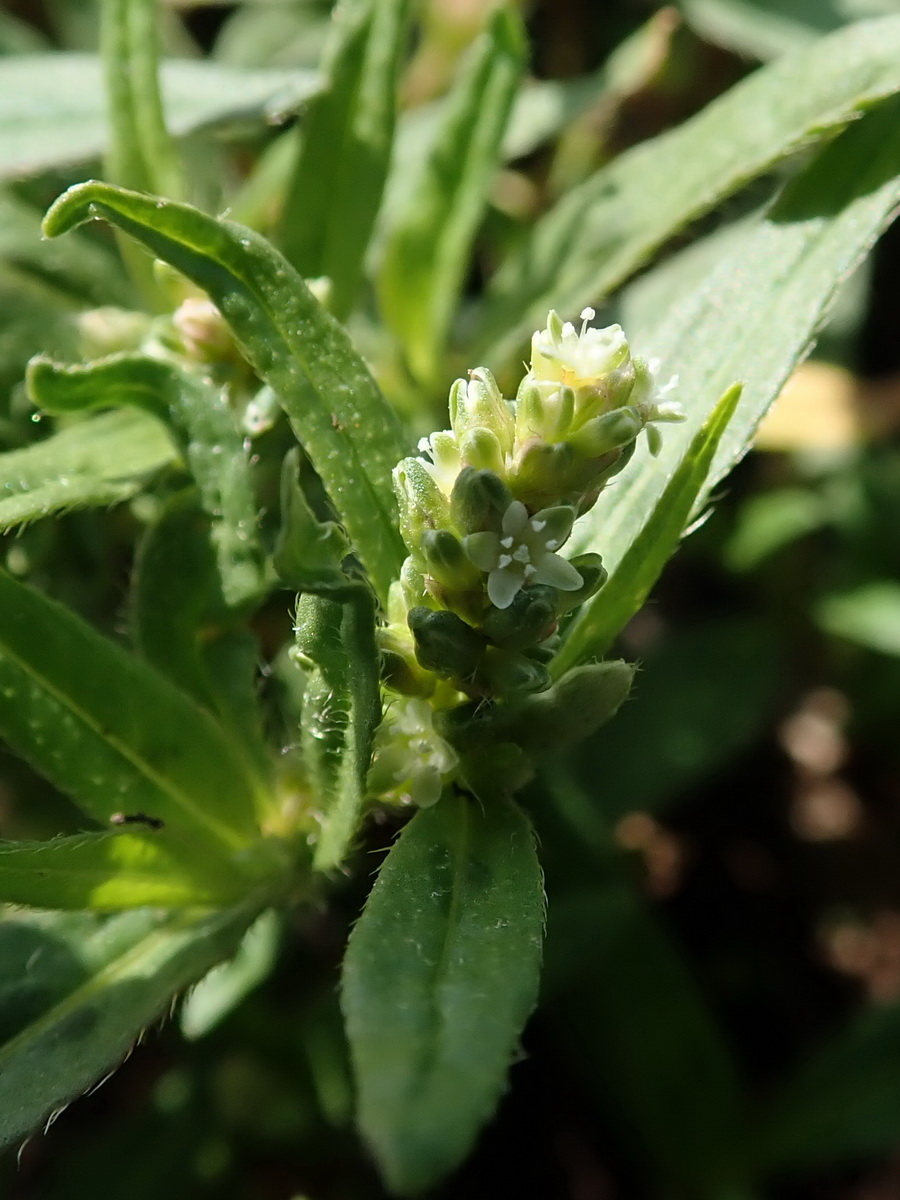
Flowers
