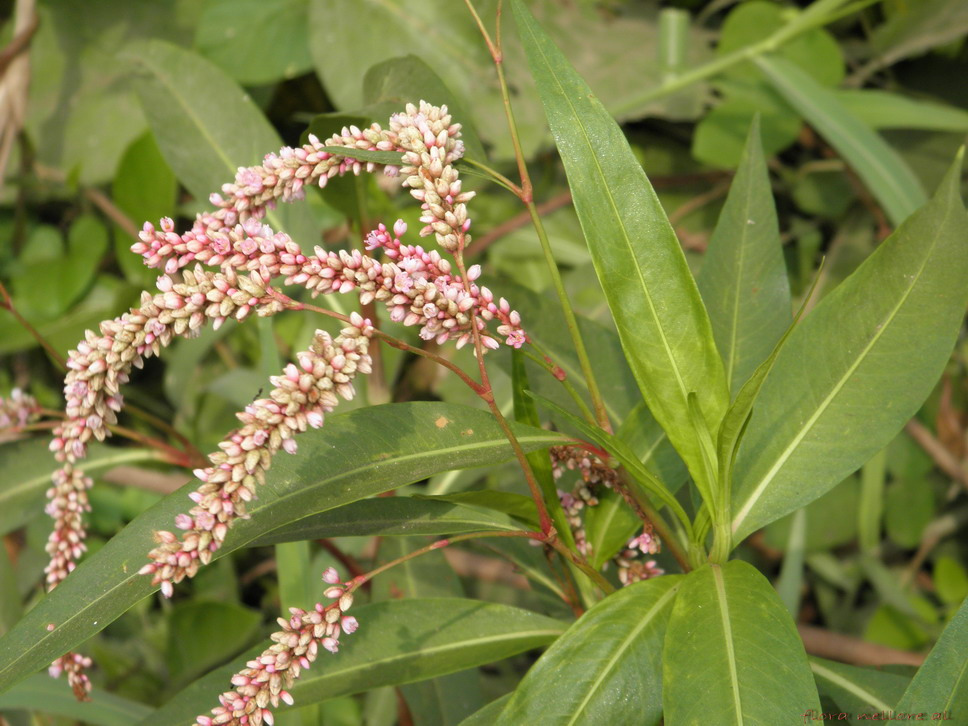

Scientific classification
- Kingdom: Plantae
- Clade: Embryophytes
- Clade: Tracheophytes
- Clade: Spermatophytes
- Clade: Angiosperms
- Clade: Eudicots
- Order: Caryophyllales
- Family: Polygonaceae
- Genus: Persicaria
- Species: P. glabra

Binomial name
- Persicaria glabra (Willd.)M.Gómez

Synonyms
- Persicaria densiflora

= Persicaria glabra =

Species of plant

Persicaria glabra, also known as denseflower knotweed, is a species of flowering plant native to North America and Eurasia.

== Description ==
It is similar in appearance to P. longiseta and P. lapathifolia. The plant is a medium-sized perennial herb with red, swollen joints and lanceolate leaves. The inflorescence is a dense raceme of small pink or white flowers, the fruit a flattened black nut.
