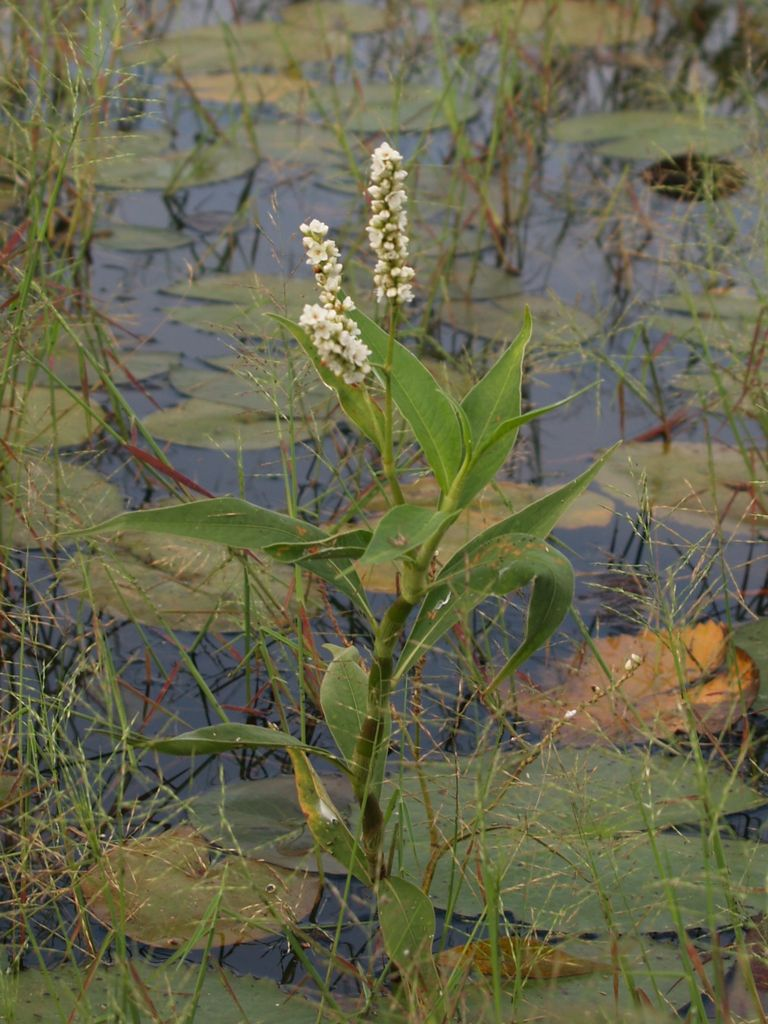

Scientific classification
- Kingdom: Plantae
- Clade: Tracheophytes
- Clade: Angiosperms
- Clade: Eudicots
- Order: Caryophyllales
- Family: Polygonaceae
- Genus: Persicaria
- Species: P. attenuata

Binomial name
- Persicaria attenuata (R.Br.) Soják

= Persicaria attenuata =

Species of plant

Persicaria attenuata is a species of flowering plant native to Australia and Asia. It typically grows in wet land or streams.
