= Persicaria senegalensis =

Scientific classification
- Kingdom: Plantae
- Clade: Tracheophytes
- Clade: Angiosperms
- Clade: Eudicots
- Order: Caryophyllales
- Family: Polygonaceae
- Genus: Persicaria
- Species: P. senegalensis

Binomial name
- Persicaria senegalensis (Meisn.) Soják

Synonyms
- Polygonum senegalensis

Species of plant

Persicaria senegalensis is a species of perennial herb in the family Polygonaceae. They have a self-supporting growth form and simple, broad leaves.

== Sources ==
This article incorporates text from a free content work. Licensed under CC0 (license statement/permission). Text taken from Persicaria senegalensis. Encyclopedia of Life.
