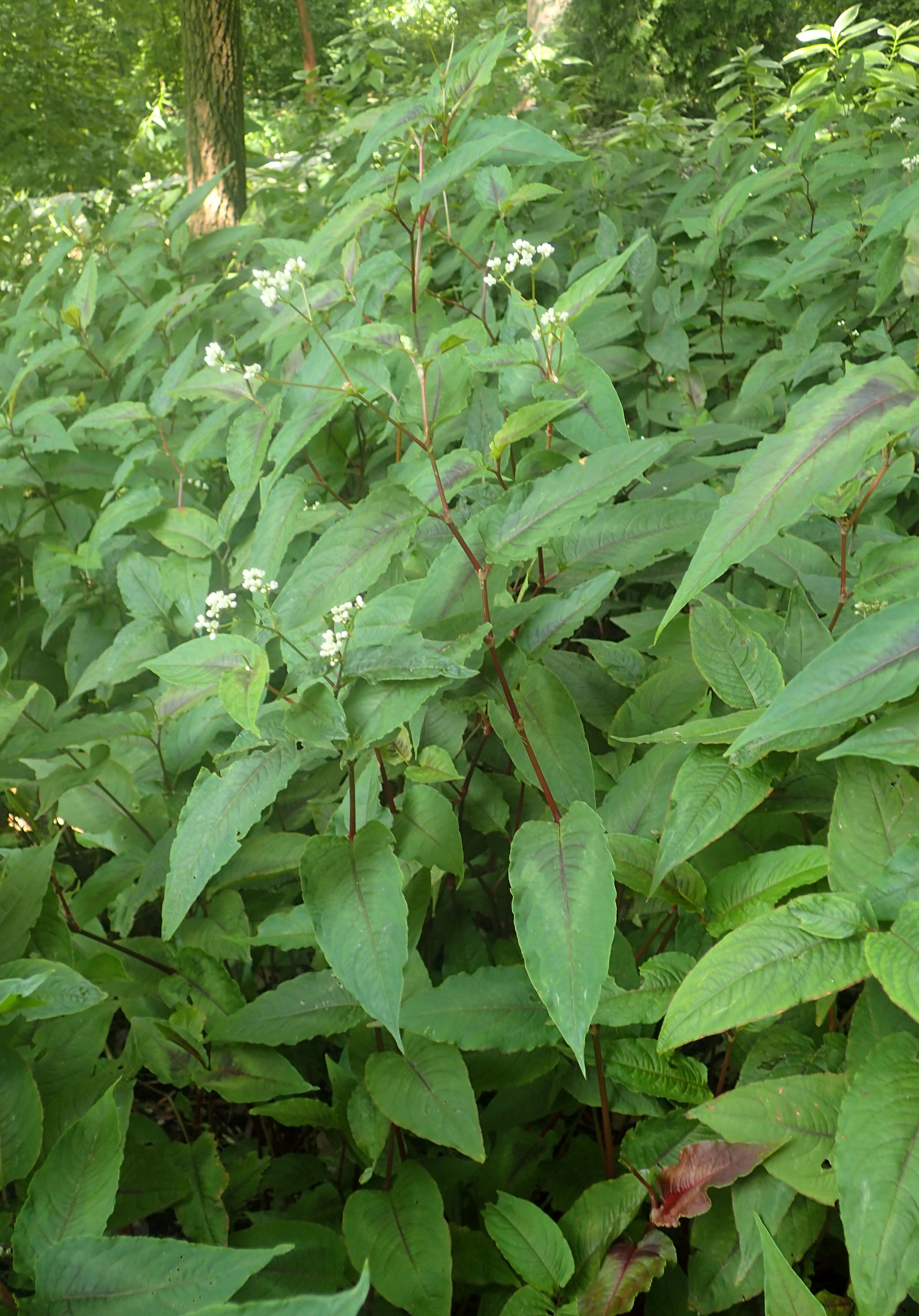
- At the Missouri Botanical Garden
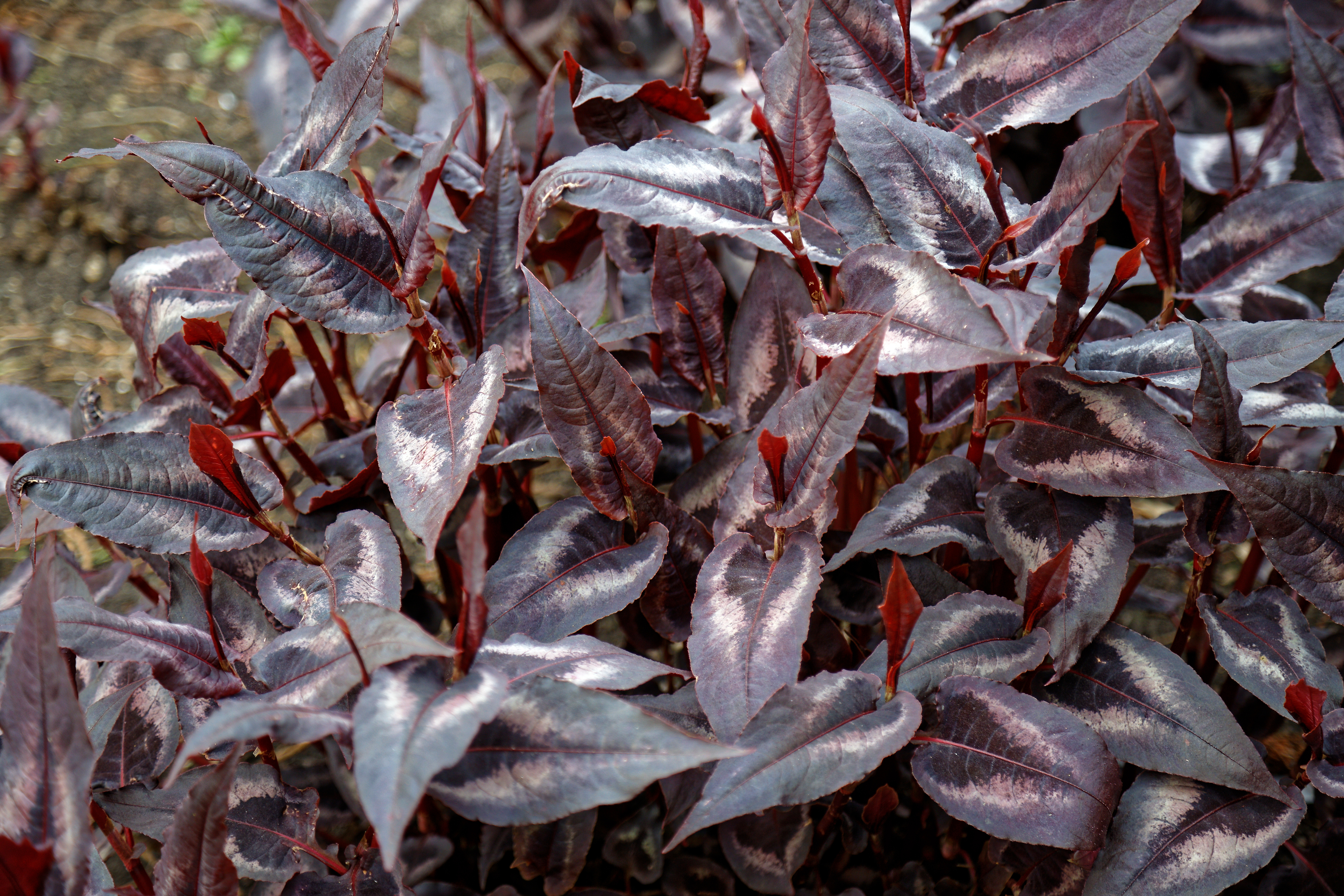
- 'Red Dragon' cultivar at RHS Garden Hyde Hall

Scientific classification
- Kingdom: Plantae
- Clade: Tracheophytes
- Clade: Angiosperms
- Clade: Eudicots
- Order: Caryophyllales
- Family: Polygonaceae
- Genus: Persicaria
- Species: P. microcephala

Binomial name
- Persicaria microcephala (D.Don) H.Gross

Synonyms
- List: Ampelygonum microcephalum (D.Don) M.A.Hassan; Persicaria sphaerocephala (Wall. ex Meisn.) H.Gross; Polygonum ciliatum Buch.-Ham. ex D.Don; Polygonum microcephalum D.Don; Polygonum microcephalum var. sphaerocephalum (Wall. ex Meisn.) Murata; Polygonum podocephalum Klotzsch; Polygonum sphaerocephalum Wall. ex Meisn.; Polygonum staticiflorum Wall.; Polygonum wallichii Wight

= Persicaria microcephala =

Species of plant

Persicaria microcephala (syn. Polygonum microcephalum), the small-headed knotweed, is a species of flowering plant in the family Polygonaceae. It is native to the Himalayas, and central and southern China, and it has been introduced to Great Britain. Its cultivar 'Red Dragon' has gained the Royal Horticultural Society's Award of Garden Merit.

== Subtaxa ==
The following varieties are accepted:

- Persicaria microcephala var. microcephala
- Persicaria microcephala var. sphaerocephala (Wall. ex Meisn.) H.Hara
