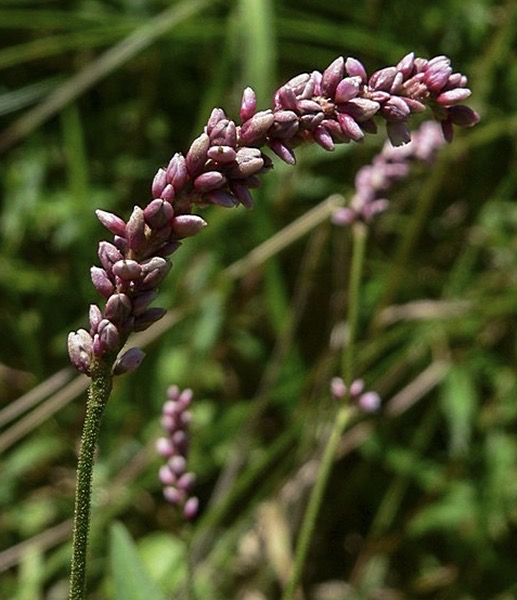

Conservation status
- Vulnerable (EPBC Act)

Scientific classification
- Kingdom: Plantae
- Clade: Tracheophytes
- Clade: Angiosperms
- Clade: Eudicots
- Order: Caryophyllales
- Family: Polygonaceae
- Genus: Persicaria
- Species: P. elatior

Binomial name
- Persicaria elatior (R.Br.) K.L.Wilson

Synonyms
- Polygonum elatius R.Br.

= Persicaria elatior =

Species of flowering plant

Persicaria elatior, commonly known as tall knotweed, is a species of flowering plant native to eastern Australia. It was one of eleven species selected for the Save a Species Walk campaign in April 2016; scientists walked 300 km to raise money for the collection of seeds to be prepared and stored at the Australian PlantBank at the Australian Botanic Garden Mount Annan.

== Conservation status ==
Persicaria elatior is classified as "Vulnerable" under the Environment Protection and Biodiversity Conservation Act 1999.
