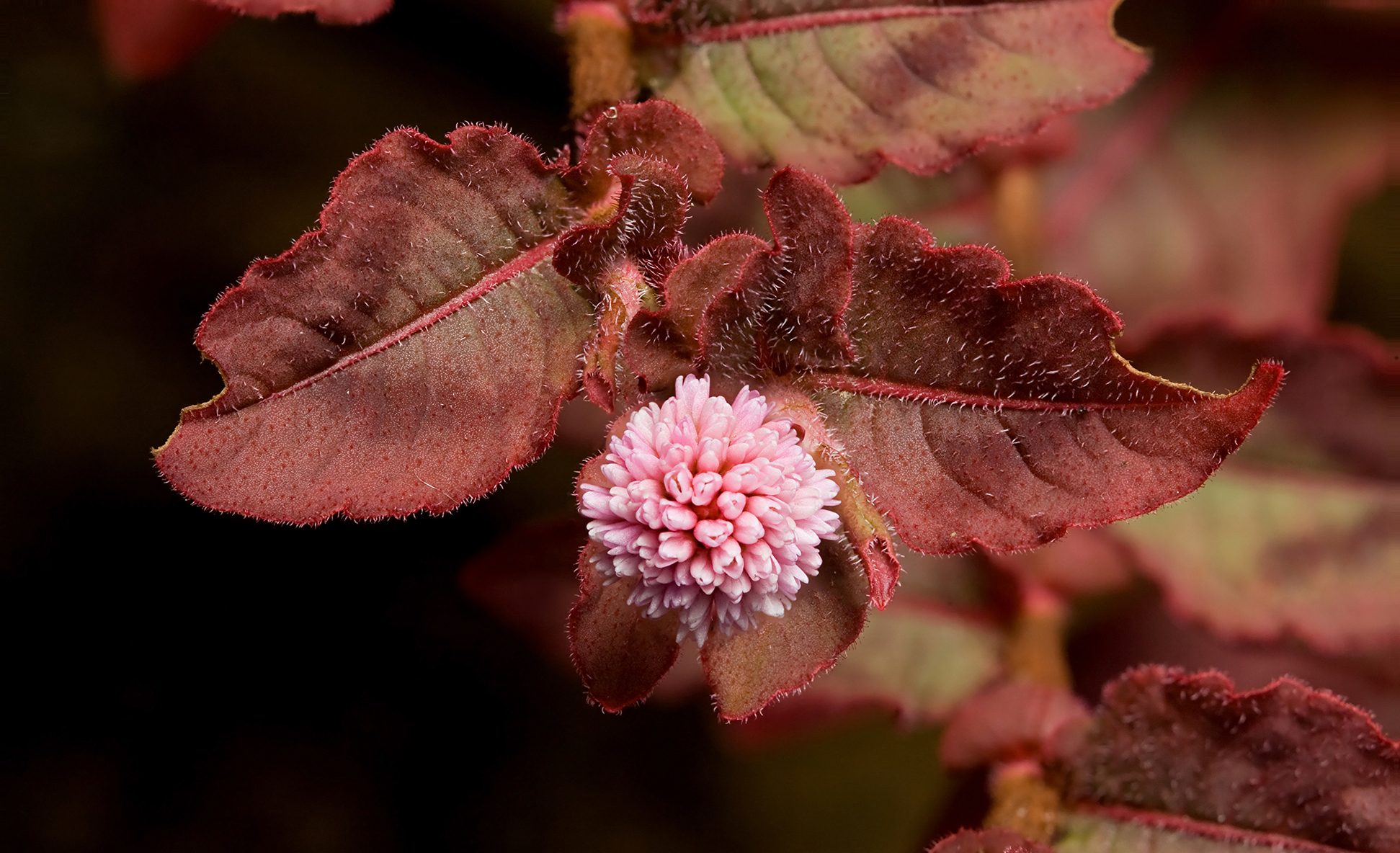

Scientific classification
- Kingdom: Plantae
- Clade: Tracheophytes
- Clade: Angiosperms
- Clade: Eudicots
- Order: Caryophyllales
- Family: Polygonaceae
- Genus: Persicaria
- Species: P. capitata

Binomial name
- Persicaria capitata (Buch.-Ham. ex D.Don) H.Gross 1913

Synonyms
- Polygonum capitatum Buch.-Ham. ex D. Don 1825; Cephalophilon capitatum (Buch.-Ham. ex D. Don) Tzvelev

= Persicaria capitata =

Species of plant

Persicaria capitata, the pink-headed persicaria, pinkhead smartweed, pink knotweed, Japanese knotweed, or pink bubble persicaria, is an Asian species of plants in the genus Persicaria within the Polygonaceae (US: buckwheat) family. It is native to Asia (China, South Asia, Indochina) and grown as an ornamental in other countries. It has become naturalized in Australia, South Africa and a few scattered locations in the Americas.

== Description ==
Persicaria capitata is a prostrate herb. The leaves are 1–6 cm long, 0.7–3 cm wide with pink to red bands or blotches and short scattered hairs. The spikes are 5–10 mm long and 5–7 mm in diameter.

== Distribution and habitat ==
Persicaria capitata is a native of Asia. It has naturalised in parts of Australia and North America. Between 2008 and 2013 it has been recorded as an invasive plant in Ireland from the Counties Fermanagh, Kilkenny, Wexford and Mayo.

== Uses ==
Persicaria capitata has been widely used in China in the treatment of various urologic disorders including urinary calculi and urinary tract infections.

== See also ==
- Reynoutria japonica for another plant species called Japanese knotweed.
