= Bistort =

Bistort is a common name for several plants and may refer to:

- Bistorta, a genus recognized by some sources including the species:
  - Bistorta bistortoides, native to North America
  - Bistorta officinalis (Persicaria bistorta), native to Europe
