= B. macrophylla =

B. macrophylla may refer to:

- Bistorta macrophylla a flowering plant species native to China, Bhutan, India and Nepal
- Bouea macrophylla, a tropical fruit tree native to Southeast Asia

== Synonyms ==
- Banksia macrophylla, a synonym for Banksia robur, a plant species found in Australia

== See also ==
- Macrophylla
