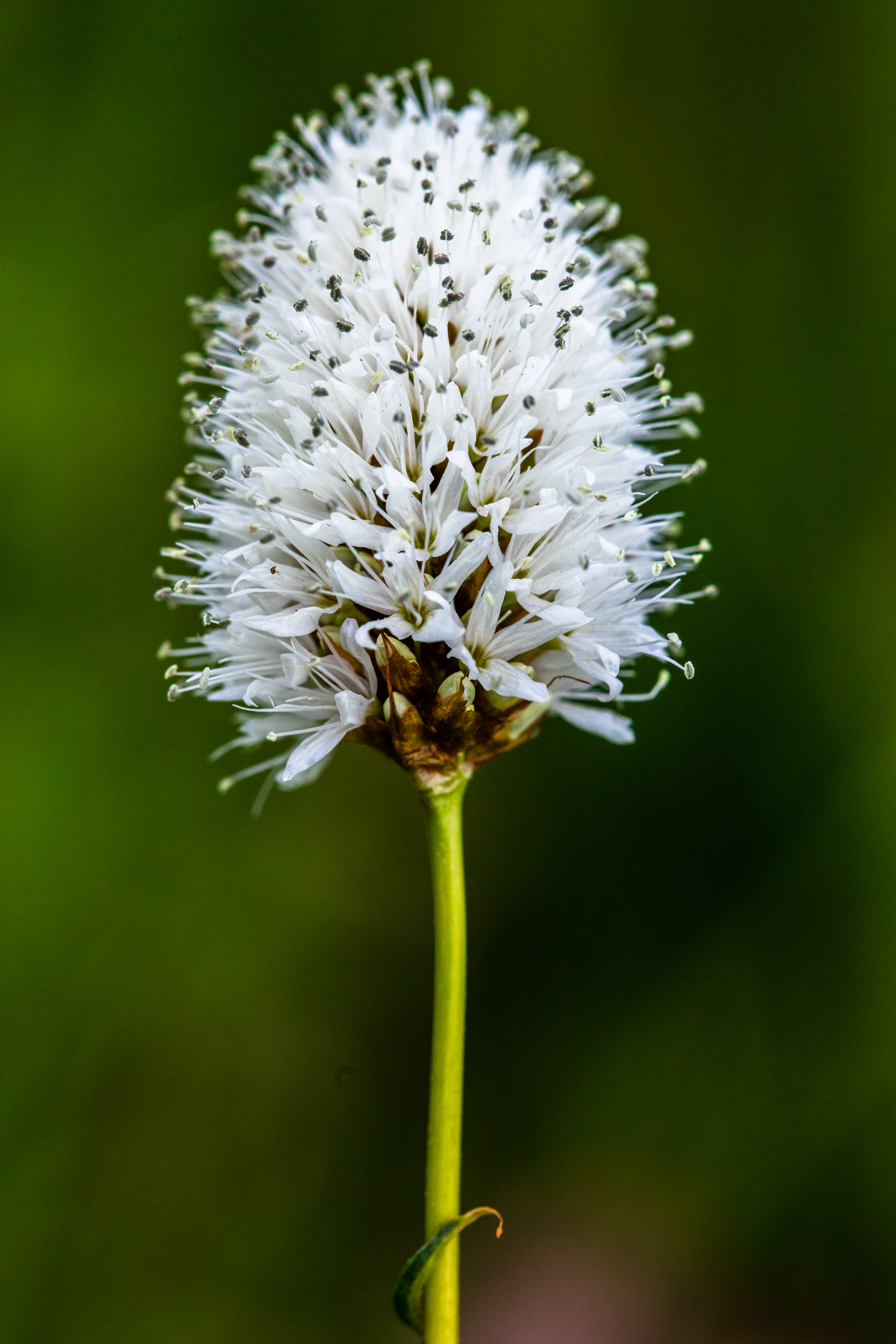
- Inflorescence photographed in Yellowstone National Park

Conservation status
- Secure (NatureServe)

Scientific classification
- Kingdom: Plantae
- Clade: Embryophytes
- Clade: Tracheophytes
- Clade: Spermatophytes
- Clade: Angiosperms
- Clade: Eudicots
- Order: Caryophyllales
- Family: Polygonaceae
- Genus: Bistorta
- Species: B. bistortoides

Binomial name
- Bistorta bistortoides (Pursh) Small

Synonyms
- Persicaria bistortoides (Pursh) H.R.Hinds; Polygonum bistortoides Pursh

= Bistorta bistortoides =

Species of flowering plant in the buckwheat family

Bistorta bistortoides, commonly called western bistort, is a perennial herb in the buckwheat family. It grows mainly in the western United States, but also extends into small areas of southern Canada and northern Mexico. It is an edible plant that is part of the traditional diet of native peoples.

== Description ==
Western bistort grows from a twisted rhizome at a shallow depth in the soil. These range from about the size of a pea to that of a thumb. The buds form at the near end of the rhizome as much as four years before they sprout. The older, far end, of the rhizome eventually dies, but this may take several decades. It is a perennial plant growing up to 10 to 75 centimeters (4 to 30 in) tall in maturity. Each plant has one to three flowering stems, with no woody parts.

The ocreae, the sheath formed from two stipules at the base of each leaf, is round, hairless, brown, smooth, and 9–32 millimeters (3/8–1 1/4 in) long. The plants have mostly basal leaves, those attached to the plant at ground level, but also have some smaller leaves on the flowering stems. The leaves are long and narrow, usually 5–22 cm (2–8 1/2 in) long, only rarely as short as 3.5 cm, and 0.8 to 4.8 cm wide. Their shape is lanceolate, oblanceolate, or elliptic with an often asymmetrical base. There are two to six leaves attached to each flowering stem with the lower ones being attached by short stalks and the upper ones without. When first revealed by the melting snow the young leaves are quite red in color.

There is usually one inflorescence per stem, occasionally two. It is dense and cylindrical to oblong, ranging from 1–5 centimeters (3/8–2 inches) long and 0.8–2.5 cm (3/8–1 in) in diameter. They are packed with small white to pinkish flowers, each a few millimeters wide and with eight protruding stamens. Each individual flower has five tepals, petallike sepals, and a sharp smell somewhat like that of dirty socks. The blooming period is in the local elevation's springtime. This is as early as May at low elevations and as late as September at high altitudes. The development of the plant in the Rocky Mountains is rapid, with a studied population in the Medicine Bow Mountains taking one month from first appearance of leaves to flowering.

The seed-like fruit is simple and dry, an achene, with a shiny yellow-brown to olive-brown surface and three sides. They measure 3.2–4.2 mm long by 1.3–2 mm wide. Plants from the coastal grasslands along the Pacific Ocean and those of the coastal mountains and Sierra Nevada reproduce by rhizomes and are polyploidal. Those of the Rocky Mountains reproduce by seed and are diploid and do not spread by rhizomes.

== Taxonomy ==
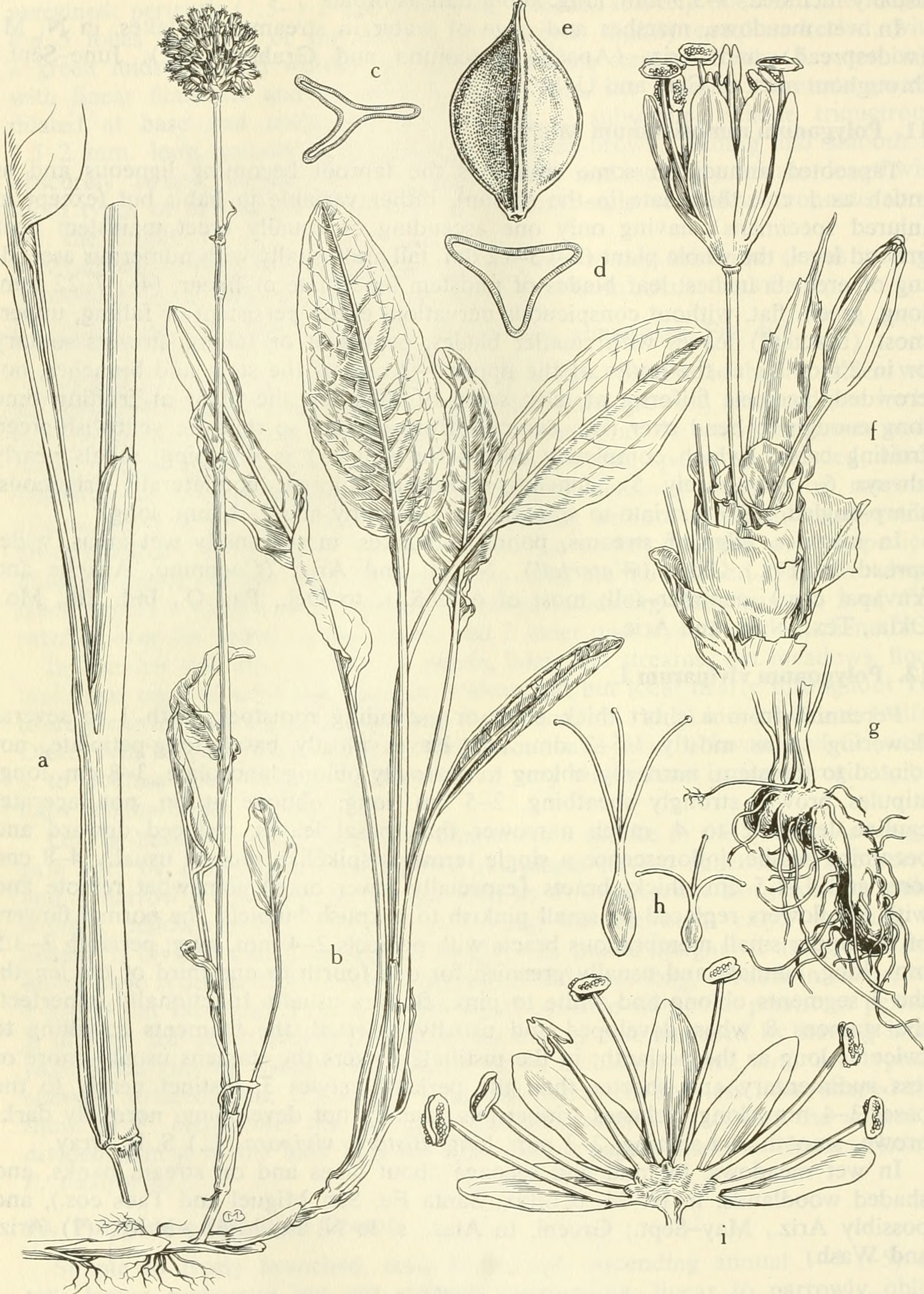
Illustration from Aquatic and Wetland Plants of Southwestern United States

Bistorta bistortoides was scientifically described and named Polygonum bistortoides by Frederick Traugott Pursh in 1813. He was working with specimens collected by Meriwether Lewis on 12 June 1806. The botanist John Kunkel Small moved it to the genus Bistorta in 1906, creating its accepted name. Together with its genus it is classified in the family Polygonaceae. It has no accepted varieties, but according to Plants of the World Online it has 27 synonyms.

Table of Synonyms
| Name | Year | Rank | Notes |
|---|---|---|---|
| Bistorta bernardina (Greene) Greene | 1904 | species | = het. |
| Bistorta bistortoides var. oblongifolia (Meisn.) Moldenke | 1973 | variety | = het. |
| Bistorta calophylla Greene | 1904 | species | = het. |
| Bistorta cephalophora (Greene) Greene | 1904 | species | = het. |
| Bistorta glastifolia (Greene) Greene | 1904 | species | = het. |
| Bistorta jejuna (Greene) Greene | 1904 | species | = het. |
| Bistorta leptophylla Greene | 1904 | species | = het. |
| Bistorta lilacina Greene | 1904 | species | = het. |
| Bistorta linearifolia (Greene) Greene | 1904 | species | = het. |
| Bistorta scaberula Greene | 1904 | species | = het. |
| Bistorta vulcanica (Greene) Greene | 1904 | species | = het. |
| Persicaria bistortoides (Pursh) H.R.Hinds | 1995 | species | ≡ hom. |
| Polygonum bernardinum Greene | 1903 | species | = het. |
| Polygonum bistorta var. linearifolium S.Watson | 1871 | variety | = het. |
| Polygonum bistorta var. oblongifolium Meisn. | 1856 | variety | = het. |
| Polygonum bistortoides Pursh | 1813 | species | ≡ hom. |
| Polygonum bistortoides var. linearifolium (S.Watson) Small | 1892 | variety | = het. |
| Polygonum bistortoides var. oblongifolium (Meisn.) H.St.John | 1937 | variety | = het. |
| Polygonum calophyllum (Greene) Fedde | 1905 | species | = het. |
| Polygonum cephalophorum Greene | 1903 | species | = het. |
| Polygonum glastifolium Greene | 1903 | species | = het. |
| Polygonum jejunum Greene | 1903 | species | = het. |
| Polygonum leptophyllum (Greene) Fedde | 1905 | species | = het. |
| Polygonum lilacinum (Greene) Fedde | 1905 | species | = het. |
| Polygonum linearifolium Greene | 1903 | species | = het. |
| Polygonum scaberulum (Greene) Fedde | 1905 | species | = het. |
| Polygonum vulcanicum Greene | 1903 | species | = het. |
Notes: ≡ homotypic synonym; = heterotypic synonym

=== Names ===
The species name, bistortoides, was applied by Pursh for its similarity to the Eurasian Bistorta officinalis. Bistorta bistortoides is very often known by the common name western bistort; it is similarly known as American bistort. Other names include mountain buckwheat, mountain meadow buckwheat, and mountain meadow knotweed. Somewhat non-specifically it is known as just smartweed, knotweed, and bistort, Lastly, it is sometimes called smokeweed, ladies' thumb, or snakeweed, but plants in the genus Gutierrezia are frequently known as snakeweeds.

In the Cheyenne language they are called ā ĭs' tō mĭmĭs' sĭs and the diminutive name toco.

== Distribution and habitat ==
Western bistort is distributed throughout the mountainous west of North America from British Columbia and Alberta south to California and eastwards into the Rocky Mountains with some plants found in Chihuahua, in northern Mexico. They are typically found at high elevations of 1,300 to 3,800 meters (4,300 to 12,500 ft), however the Jepson Herbarium reports that it is also uncommonly found in coastal freshwater marshes at sea level to 20 m (66 ft) in northern and central California.

The common habitat of western bistort is in open meadows of the western mountains into the alpine tundra above timberline. It can be found alongside streams and lakes, in boggy meadows and in moderately moist clearings. Populations in the Rocky Mountains tend to grow in the subalpine zone and alpine tundra while those in the Sierra Nevada and coastal mountains tend towards lower areas into the montane environment.

== Ecology ==
Similarly to other plants of the alpine and arctic tundras, western bistort maintains a high carbohydrate level to cope with the challenges of its environment. Approximately half of the reserves in the rhizome are used by the plant in the first week of growth as the leaves expand. The lowest levels of carbohydrates in its roots and shoots are immediately before the flower buds develop. The type of carbohydrate in the plant varies with the season, with it containing much more sugar during the winter and spring and much more starch during the fall.

Rodents and bears consume the roots, while elk and deer browse the foliage. Western bistort is one of the preferred food for pikas. During the summer the leaves and make up a moderate amount of the diet of the American pika, around 9% with the flowers contributing about another 1%. The leaves are not consumed as part of the pika's winter horde, but flowers make up around 2.5% of a haypile.

In addition to their more usual feeding upon Viola species, the caterpillars of the Mormon fritillary (Speyeria mormonia) feeds on western bistort in alpine meadows.

== Uses ==
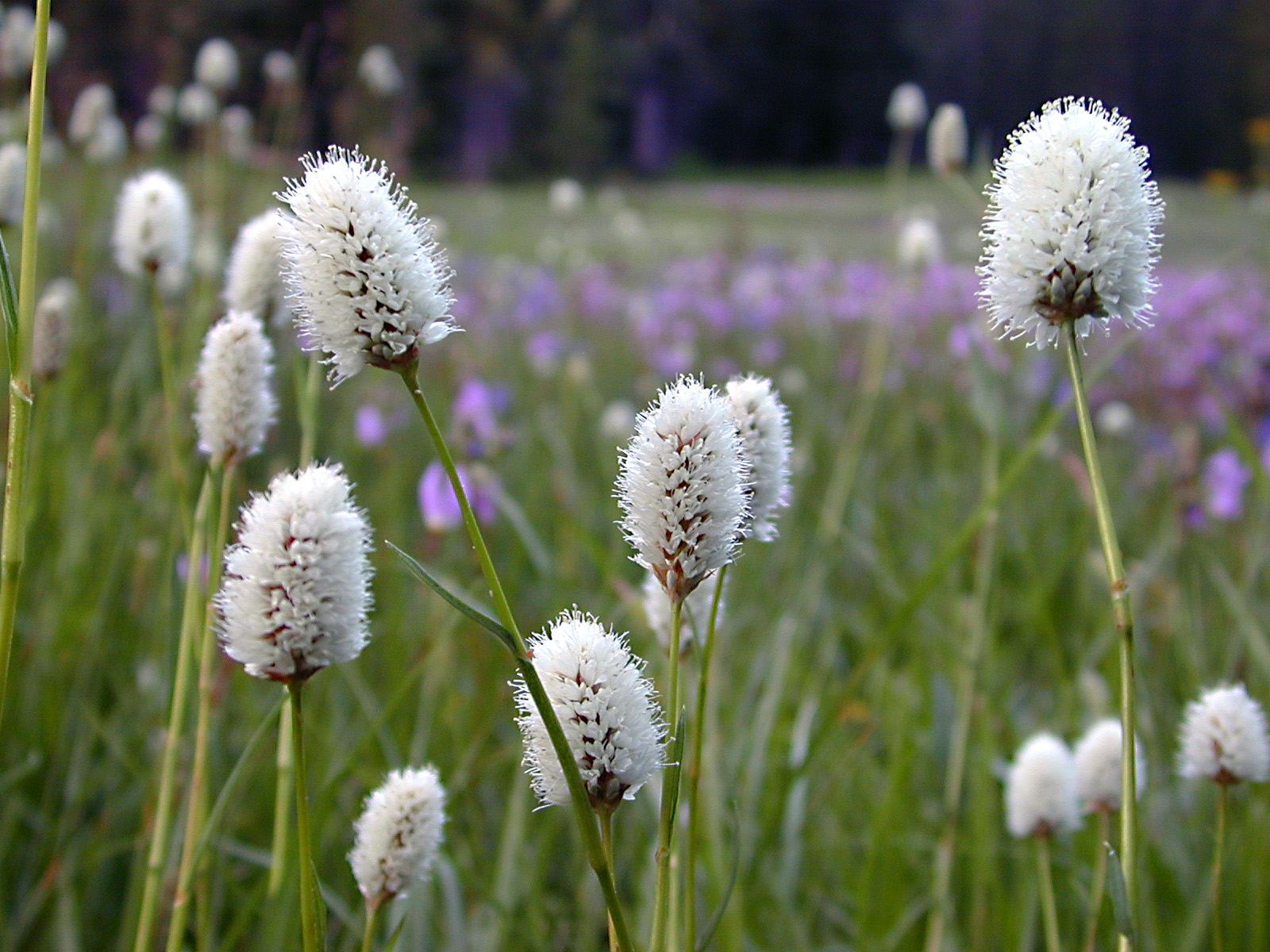
In a meadow near Glacier Point Road in Yosemite National Park, July 2005

Western bistort is an important food plant in traditional hunting and gathering practices of many peoples living in the Mountain West, including the Blackfoot and Cheyenne. The roots are edible either raw, fire-roasted, or boiled; they are starchy and flavorful when raw, but older rootstocks are moderately fibrous. The taste is somewhat like that of water chestnut (Eleocharis dulcis) when cooked. It has larger rootstalks than the related alpine bistort (Bistorta vivipara).

The young leaves are eaten raw or cooked and have a tart, though pleasant, flavor. The seeds are edible either as a boiled whole grain or ground into flour and used to make bread. The writer Doug Benoliel cautions against eating large amounts of this plant until the digestion system becomes accustomed to it; raw parts of all knotweeds can cause diarrhea if consumed to excess.

In traditional Cheyenne cooking practices the roots were boiled with meat and were held in high regard.

It is occasionally cultivated in naturalistic meadows. It is hardy in USDA zones 3b to 8b, but requires moist to wet soils.
