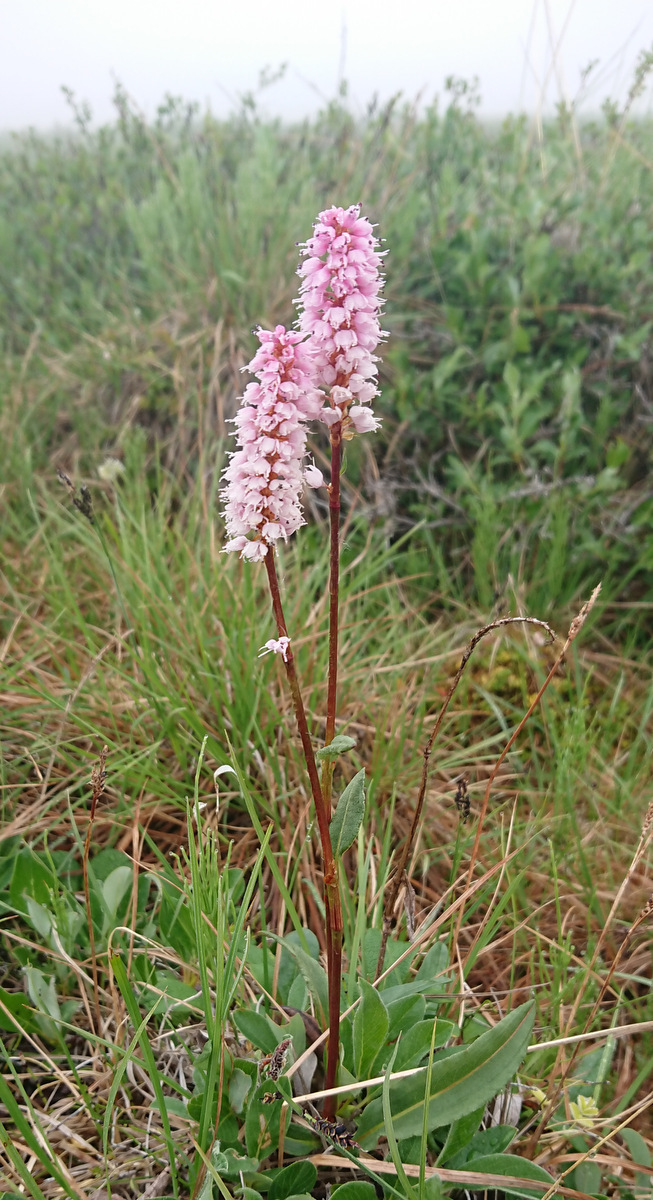

Scientific classification
- Kingdom: Plantae
- Clade: Tracheophytes
- Clade: Angiosperms
- Clade: Eudicots
- Order: Caryophyllales
- Family: Polygonaceae
- Genus: Bistorta
- Species: B. plumosa

Binomial name
- Bistorta plumosa (Small) Greene

= Bistorta plumosa =

Species of flowering plant

Bistorta plumosa is a species of flowering plant in the buckwheat family Polygonaceae. Common names for Bistorta Plumosa include meadow bistort. Bistorta plumosa is monoecious, with flowers containing both male and female reproductive parts that are pollinated by insects. Birstorta plumosa flowers annually in the summer months from May to June and can be found in habitats ranging from moist to dry sites and tundra in North America, Alaska, Yukon, the Northwest Territory, and East Asia.

== Description ==
Bistorta plumosa is a perennial herb characterized by its spiky bright pink or purplish flowers. Bistorta plumosa grows 10–40 cm tall originating from a dense, contorted rhizome. Bistorta plumosa has simple alternate leaves with winged petioles. The winged petioles are sheathing at the base. Its leaves are dark green on the surface and grey on the underside. Bistorta Plumosa's blades are commonly asymmetrical with a lanceolate or ovate shape. Stems range from single to several, depending on the plant. The stem terminates with a cylindric to egg-shaped inflorescence that Is usually greater than 1 cm in width. The flower contains tepals, stamens, and stigmas. The tepals are oblong to elliptic with the apex either obtuse or acute. The stamens can be exserted, with dark purple or black anthers.

== Distribution ==
Bistorta plumosa has an arctic-alpine distribution, and is endemic to Beringia, both Alaska and Siberia. It is found at elevations ranging from 289 m to 1575 m and is more commonly found on north facing slopes. Bistorta plumosa is an important plant in alpine tundra ecosystems.

== Taxonomy ==
Carl Linnaeus separated Bistorta into an unranked group under the genus Polygonum in 1753. Giovanni Antonio Scopoli altered the taxonomy of Bistorta by categorizing it as an independent genus in 1754. Bistorta plumosa was originally described as Polygonum plumosum by John Small in 1901. It was then placed in the genus Bistorta by Edward Greene in 1904.

== Uses ==
Bistorta plumosa's leaves contain high vitamin A and C content and are eaten as a vegetable similar to spinach. Bistorta plumosa been historically used by Alaskan Natives as a dietary aide and made into stew by boiling the roots Bistorta plumosa has been used as a model organism in studies of plant physiology, specifically carbon assimilation rates.
