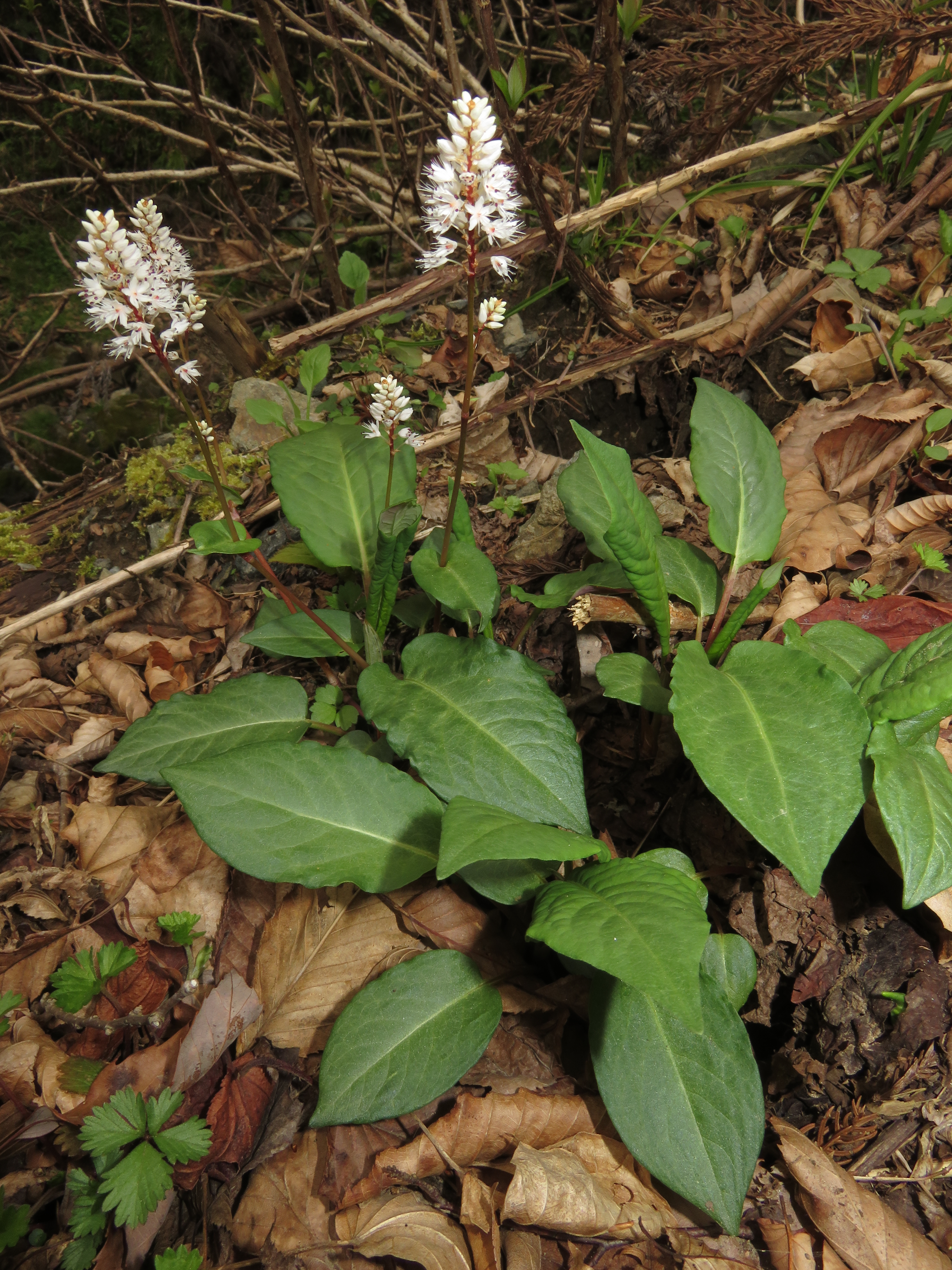

Scientific classification
- Kingdom: Plantae
- Clade: Tracheophytes
- Clade: Angiosperms
- Clade: Eudicots
- Order: Caryophyllales
- Family: Polygonaceae
- Genus: Bistorta
- Species: B. abukumensis

Binomial name
- Bistorta abukumensis Yonek., Iketsu & H.Ohashi

= Bistorta abukumensis =

Species of flowering plant

Bistorta abukumensis is a species of flowering plant in the family Polygonaceae, native to Japan. It was first described in 1995.

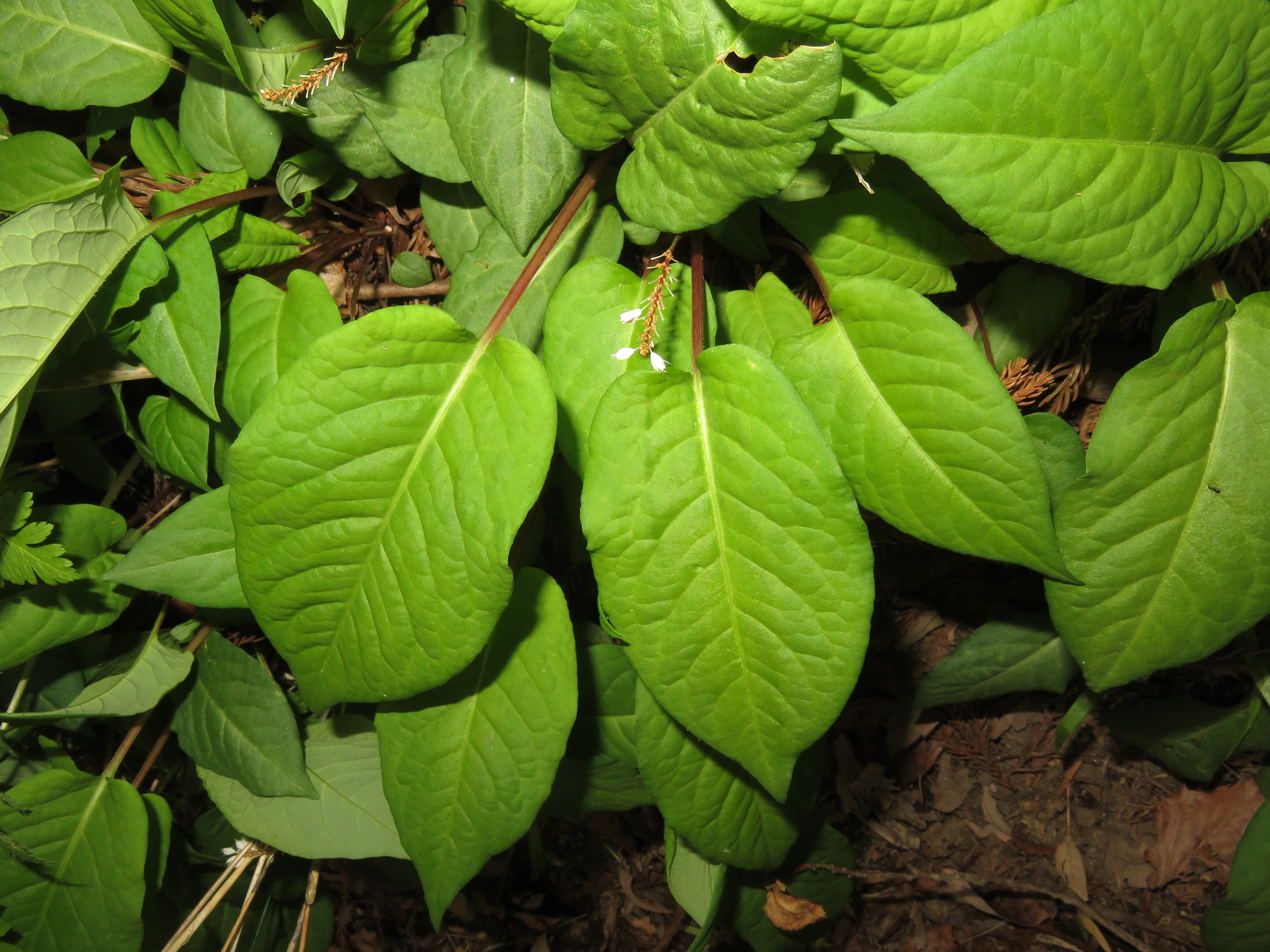
Leaves

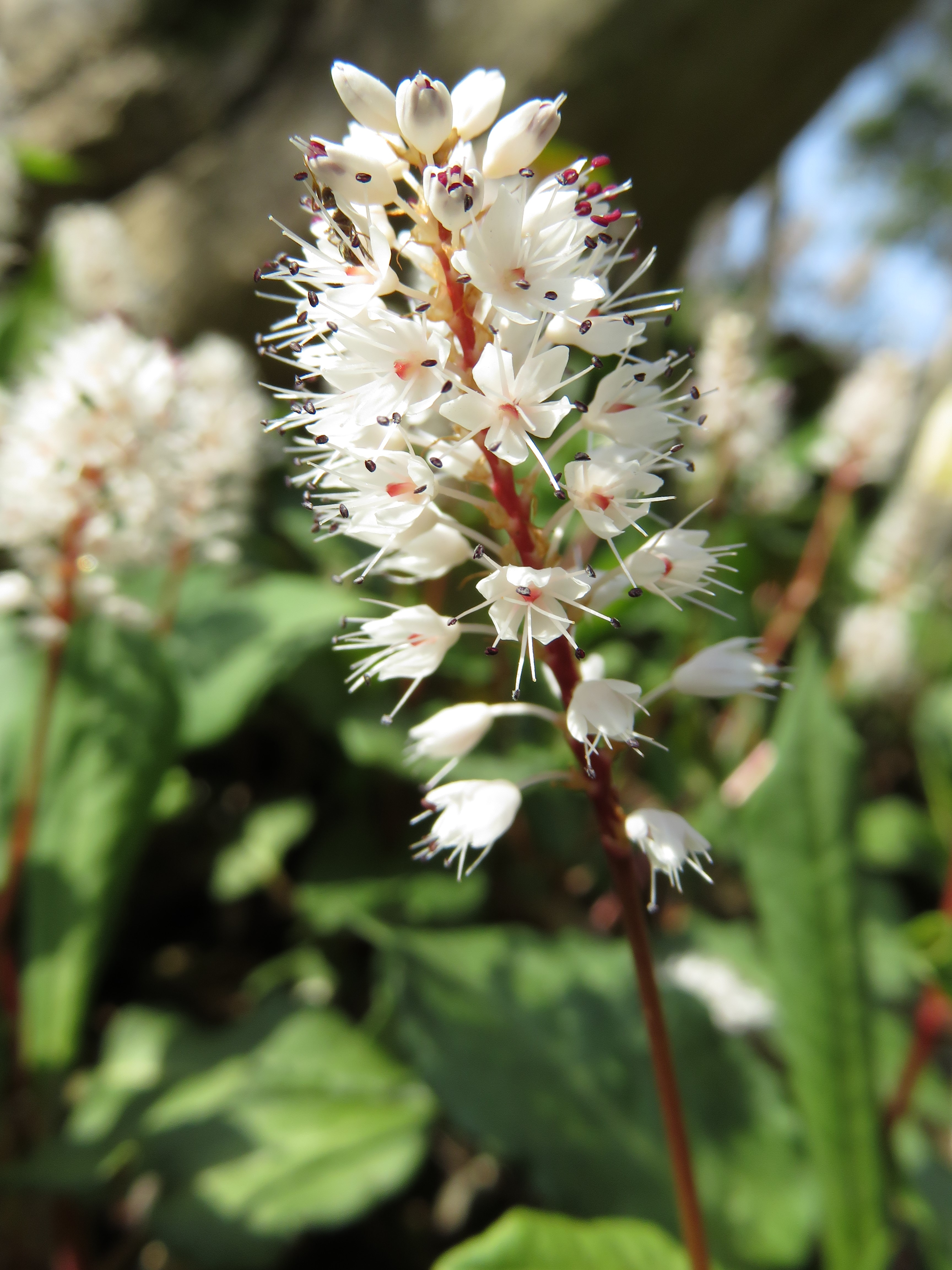
Flowers
