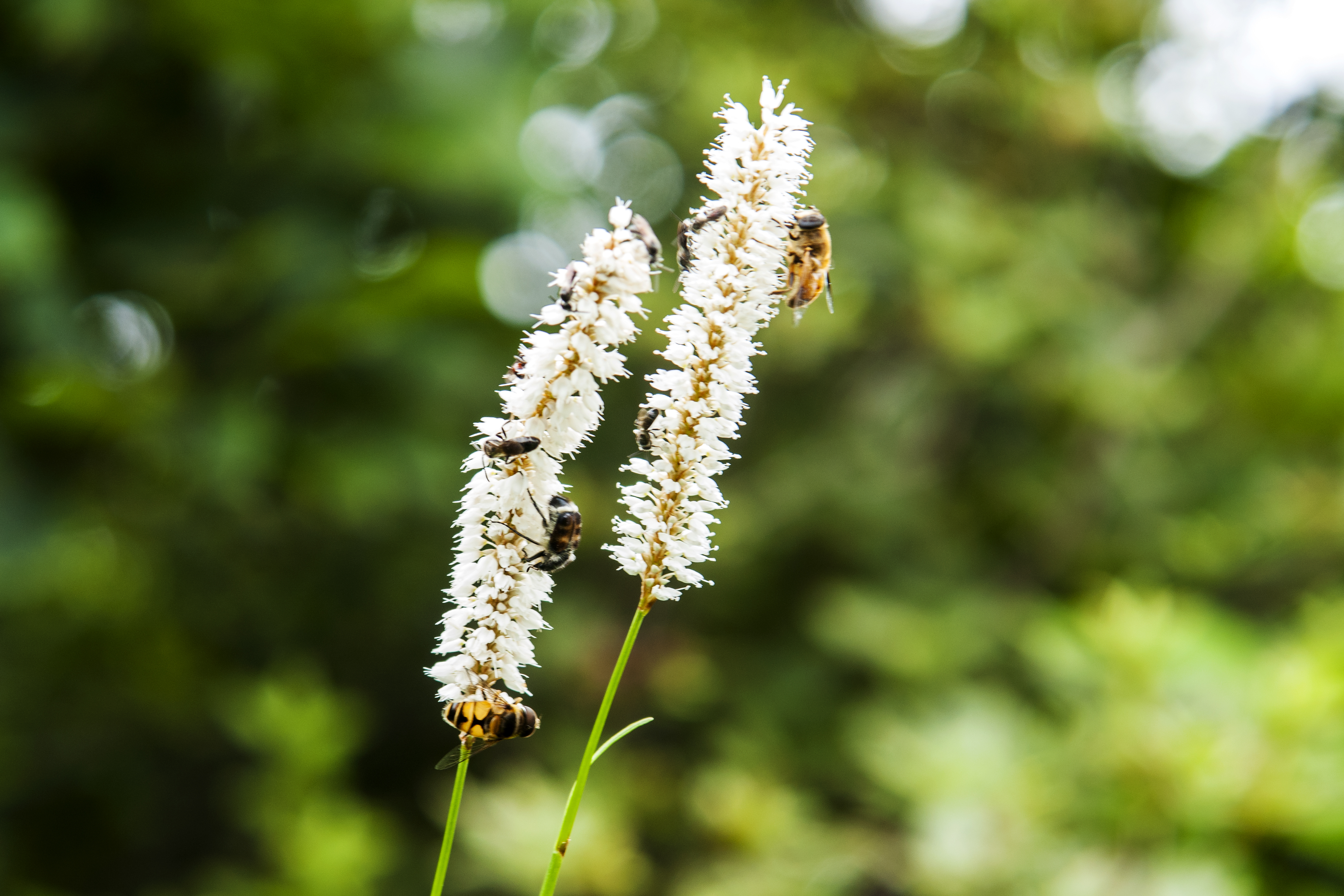

Scientific classification
- Kingdom: Plantae
- Clade: Tracheophytes
- Clade: Angiosperms
- Clade: Eudicots
- Order: Caryophyllales
- Family: Polygonaceae
- Genus: Bistorta
- Species: B. manshuriensis

Binomial name
- Bistorta manshuriensis Kom.

= Bistorta manshuriensis =

Species of flowering plant

Bistorta manshuriensis (Hangul: 범꼬리), Asian bistort, is an unresolved name for a proposed flowering plant species in the buckwheat family Polygonaceae. It is a perennial herbaceous plant found in mountain valleys and lowlands in Korea and Japan. It grows well in sunny or slightly shaded places. It grows up to 30 centimetres (12 in) - 80 centimetres (31 in).

== Medicinal uses ==
The plant contains tannins and flavonoids. Their roots are used in Korean traditional medicine for treating diarrhoea and bleeding.
