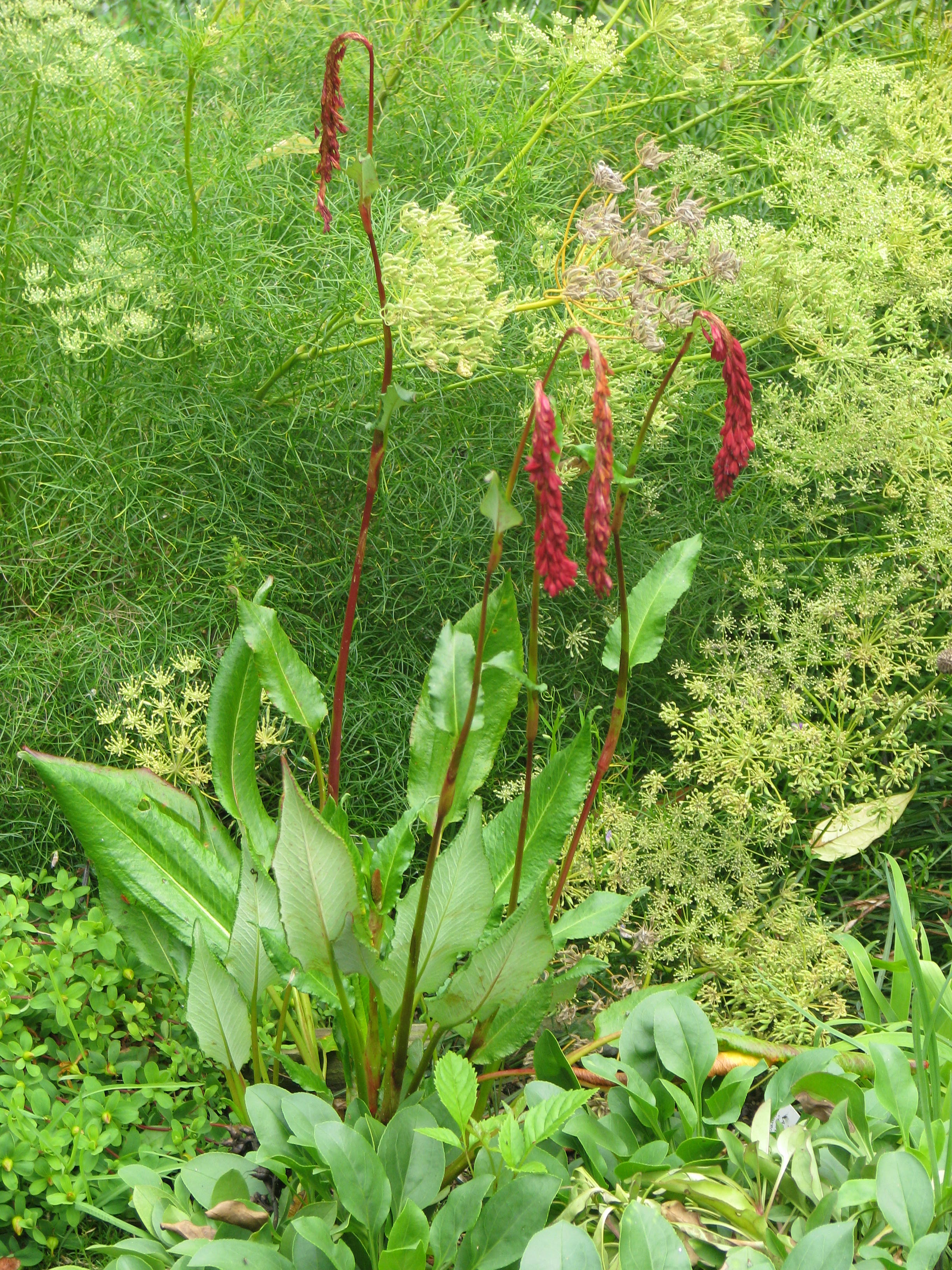

Scientific classification
- Kingdom: Plantae
- Clade: Tracheophytes
- Clade: Angiosperms
- Clade: Eudicots
- Order: Caryophyllales
- Family: Polygonaceae
- Genus: Bistorta
- Species: B. griffithii

Binomial name
- Bistorta griffithii (Hook.f.) Grierson

Synonyms
- Bistorta calostachya (Diels) Soják; Persicaria griffithii (Hook.f.) Cubey; Polygonum calostachyum Diels; Polygonum griffithii Hook.f.

= Bistorta griffithii =

Species of flowering plant

Bistorta griffithii is a species of flowering plant in the family Polygonaceae, native to Tibet, East Himalaya, South-Central China and Myanmar.

== Taxonomy ==
Bistorta griffithii was first described in 1886 by Joseph Dalton Hooker as Polygonum griffithii. It was transferred to the genus Bistorta in 1982 by Andrew Grierson.

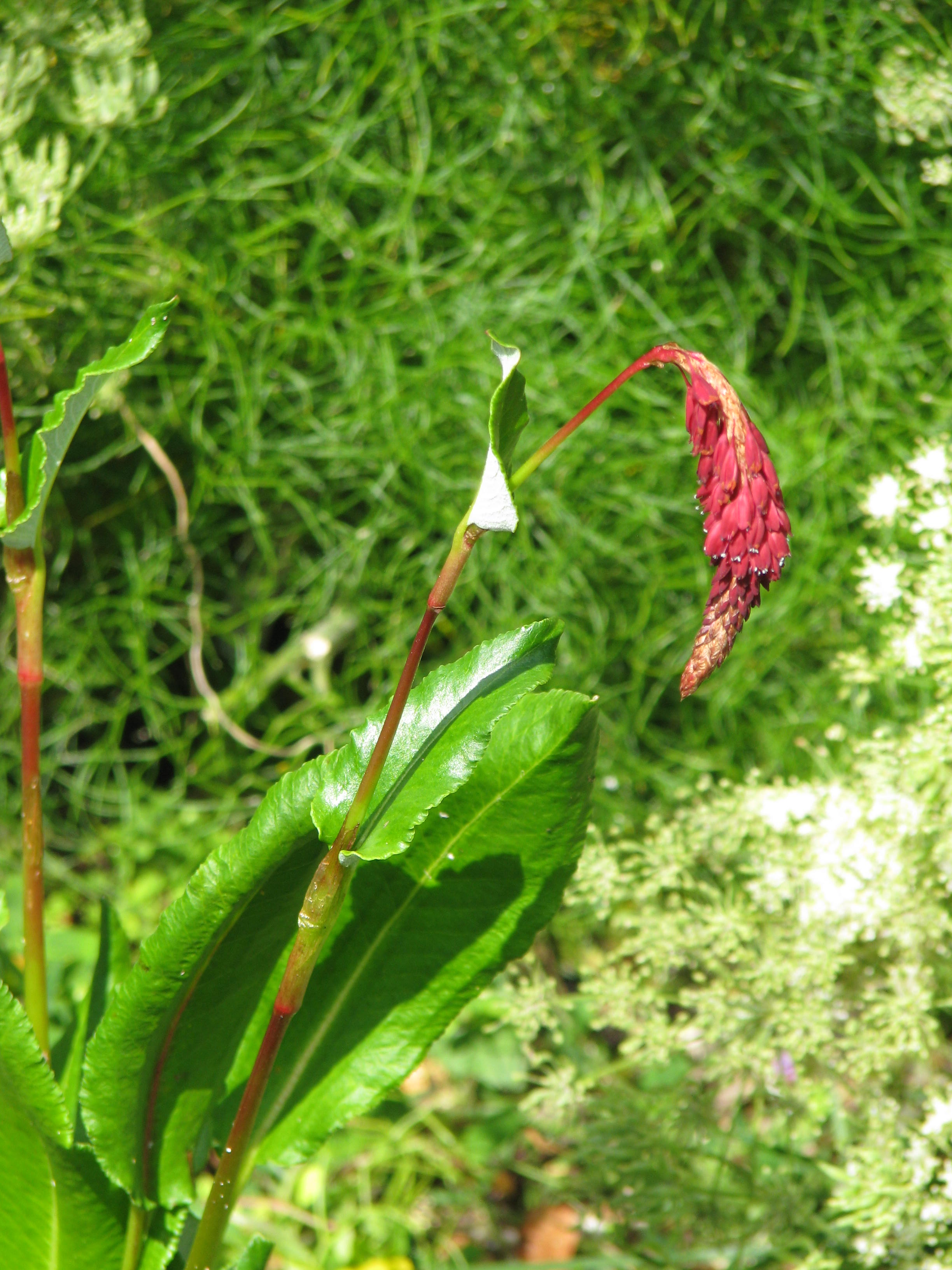
Flowers and leaves

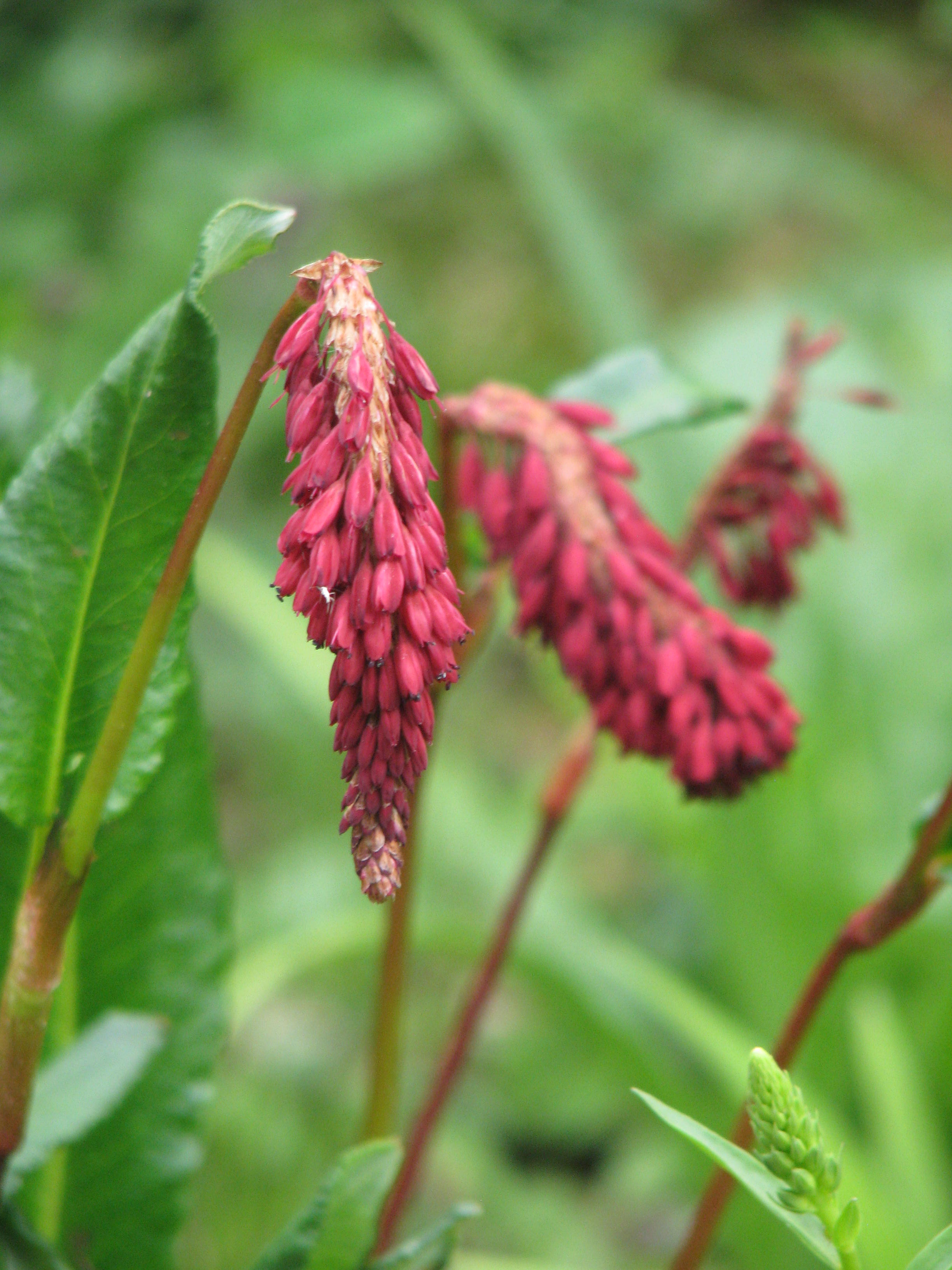
Flowers
