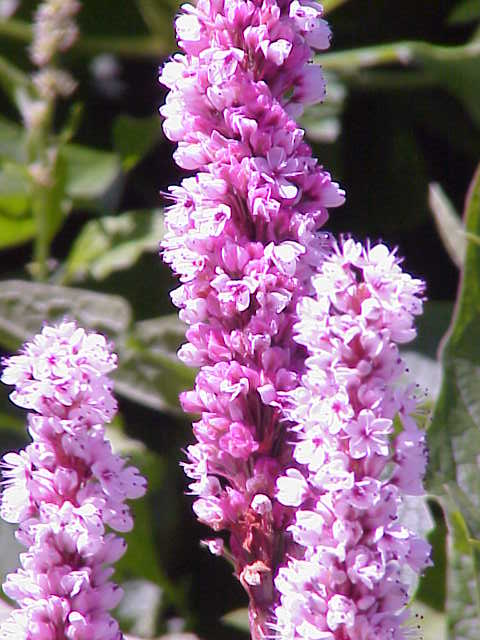

Scientific classification
- Kingdom: Plantae
- Clade: Tracheophytes
- Clade: Angiosperms
- Clade: Eudicots
- Order: Caryophyllales
- Family: Polygonaceae
- Genus: Bistorta
- Species: B. affinis

Binomial name
- Bistorta affinis (D. Don) Greene

Synonyms
- Persicaria affinis (D.Don) Ronse Decr.; Polygonum affine D.Don

= Bistorta affinis =

Species of plant

Bistorta affinis (synonyms Polygonum affine, Persicaria affinis), the Himalayan bistort, fleece flower, or knotweed, is a species of flowering plant in the family Polygonaceae, native to the Himalayas (Tibet, Nepal, northern India, Pakistan, Kashmir).

== Description ==
Bistorta affinis is a creeping, densely tufted, mat-forming perennial, growing to 25 cm (10 in) tall by 60 cm (24 in) broad. The narrow elliptic leaves are white on the underside because of a waxy coating. Leaves are mostly at the base, 3–8 cm long, with the base narrowed to a short stalk. Leaf margins are entire or very finely toothed. The mid-vein is prominent. Cylindrical spikes of many pale pink or rose-red flowers are borne at the top of short erect stems, from midsummer to autumn. Flower-spikes are 5–7.5 cm (2–3 in) long, with densely crowded flowers. Stamens protrude slightly out of the flowers. Flowering stems are several, 5–25 cm tall, with very few smaller leaves. When the flowers have died, they tend to persist on the plant into winter.

== Habitat ==
Bistorta affinis is found in the Himalayas, from Afghanistan to eastern Nepal, at altitudes of 3,000–4,800 m (9,843–15,748 ft).

== Cultivation ==
Bistorta affinis is used ornamentally as groundcover. Under the synonym Persicaria affinis the following cultivars have gained the Royal Horticultural Society's Award of Garden Merit:

- 'Darjeeling Red'
- 'Donald Lowndes'
- 'Superba'
