= Bistorta amplexicaulis =

Scientific classification
- Kingdom: Plantae
- Clade: Tracheophytes
- Clade: Angiosperms
- Clade: Eudicots
- Order: Caryophyllales
- Family: Polygonaceae
- Genus: Bistorta
- Species: B. amplexicaulis

Binomial name
- Bistorta amplexicaulis (D. Don) Greene

Synonyms
- Bistorta henryi Yonek. & H.Ohashi; Bistorta oxyphylla (Wall. ex Meisn.) Greene; Bistorta petiolata (D.Don) Petrov; Bistorta speciosa Greene; Persicaria amplexicaulis (D.Don) Ronse Decr.; Polygonum amplexicaule D.Don; Polygonum oxyphyllum Wall. ex Meisn.; Polygonum petiolatum D.Don

Species of flowering plant

Bistorta amplexicaulis (synonym Persicaria amplexicaulis), the red bistort or mountain fleece, is a species of flowering plant in the buckwheat family Polygonaceae, native to China, the Himalayas, and Pakistan. It is a damp-loving herbaceous perennial growing to 1.2 m (4 ft) tall and wide, with heart-shaped pointed leaves, downy beneath, and narrow spikes of rose-red or white flowers in summer.

Numerous cultivars have been developed for garden use, including 'Firetail'.

== Etymology ==
The Latin specific epithet amplexicaulis means "clasping or embracing the stem", and refers to the leaves' habit of growing around the stem.
