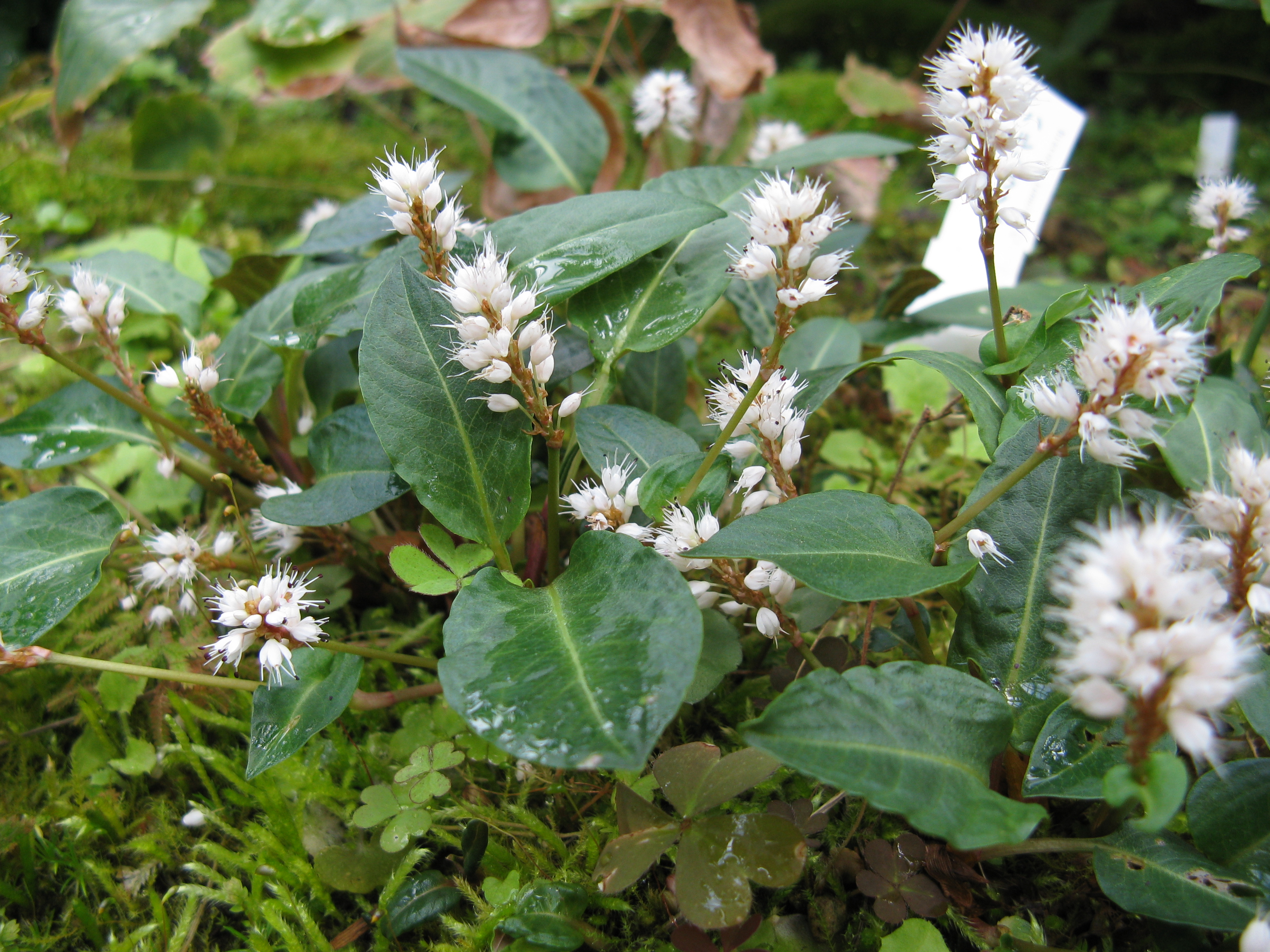

Scientific classification
- Kingdom: Plantae
- Clade: Tracheophytes
- Clade: Angiosperms
- Clade: Eudicots
- Order: Caryophyllales
- Family: Polygonaceae
- Genus: Bistorta
- Species: B. tenuicaulis

Binomial name
- Bistorta tenuicaulis (Bisset & S.Moore) Nakai

Synonyms
- Persicaria tenuicaulis (Bisset & S.Moore) Cubey; Polygonum tenuicaule Bisset & S.Moore

= Bistorta tenuicaulis =

Species of flowering plant

Bistorta tenuicaulis is a species of flowering plant in the family Polygonaceae, native to South Korea and Japan. The species was first described as Polygonum tenuicaule by James Bisset and Spencer Moore in 1878, and transferred to the genus Bistorta by Takenoshin Nakai in 1926.
