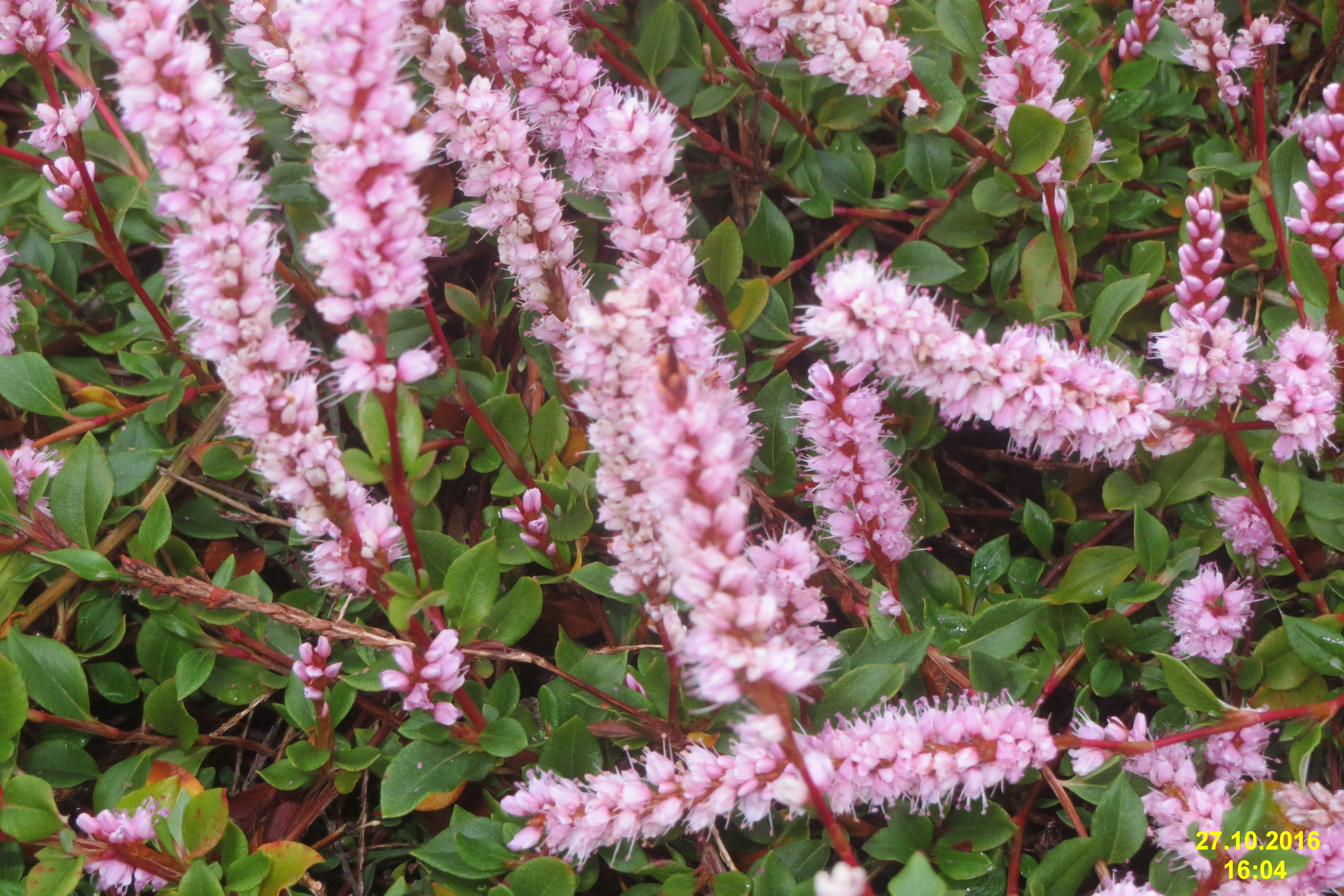
- In bloom
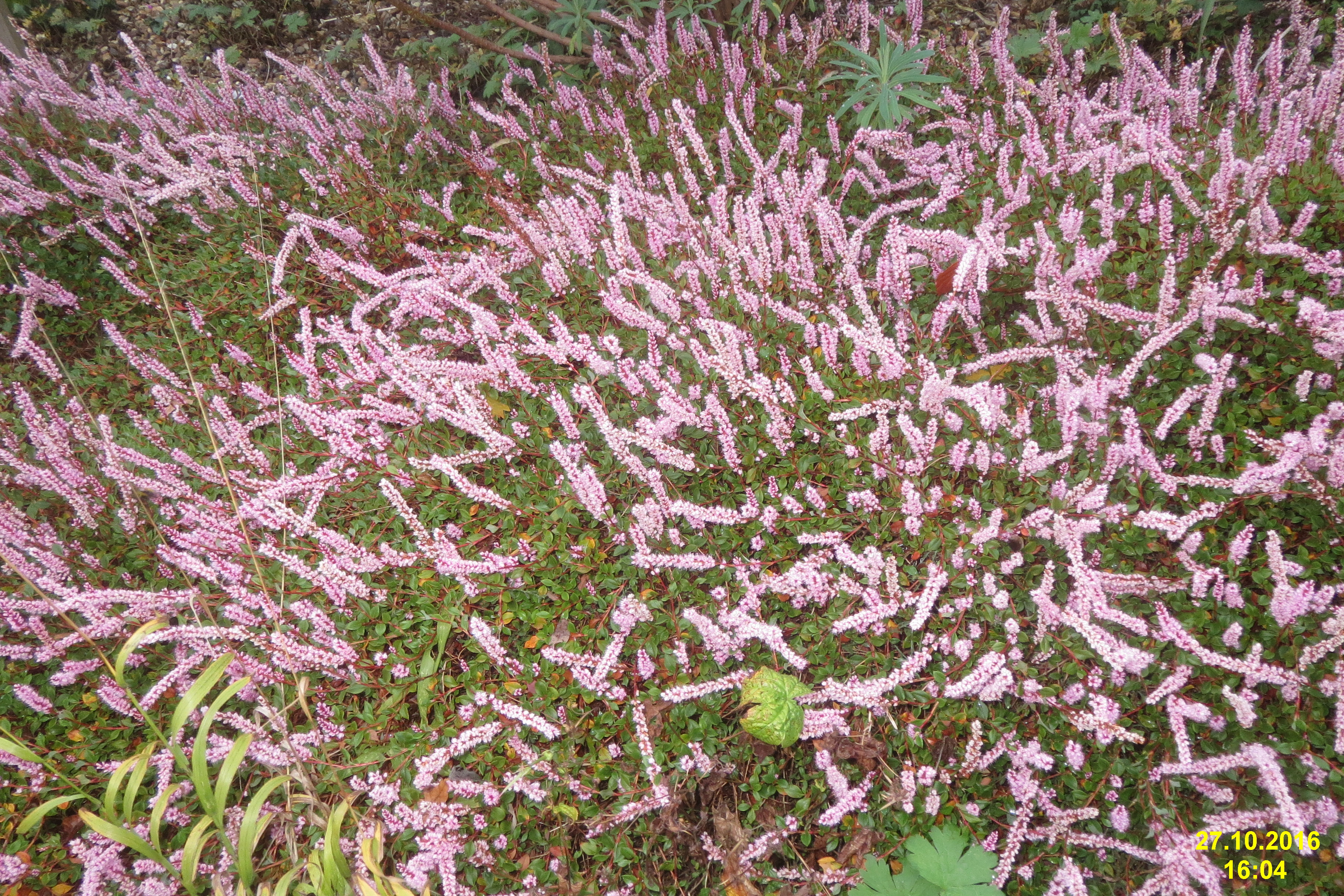
- Mass effect

Scientific classification
- Kingdom: Plantae
- Clade: Embryophytes
- Clade: Tracheophytes
- Clade: Spermatophytes
- Clade: Angiosperms
- Clade: Eudicots
- Order: Caryophyllales
- Family: Polygonaceae
- Genus: Bistorta
- Species: B. vacciniifolia

Binomial name
- Bistorta vacciniifolia (Wall. ex Meisn.) Greene

Synonyms
- List: Persicaria vacciniifolia (Wall. ex Meisn.) Ronse Decr.; Polygonum vacciniifolium Wall. ex Meisn.; Polygonum vacciniifolium var. flagelliforme Meisn.; Polygonum vacciniifolium var. medium Meisn.; Polygonum vacciniifolium var. obtusifolium Meisn.

= Bistorta vacciniifolia =

Species of flowering plant

Bistorta vacciniifolia, the whortleberry-leaved knotweed, is a species of flowering plant in the family Polygonaceae, native to Tibet and the Himalaya. Well-suited for clay soils, as its synonym Persicaria vacciniifolia it has gained the Royal Horticultural Society's Award of Garden Merit.
