= Dock pudding =

Savoury dish

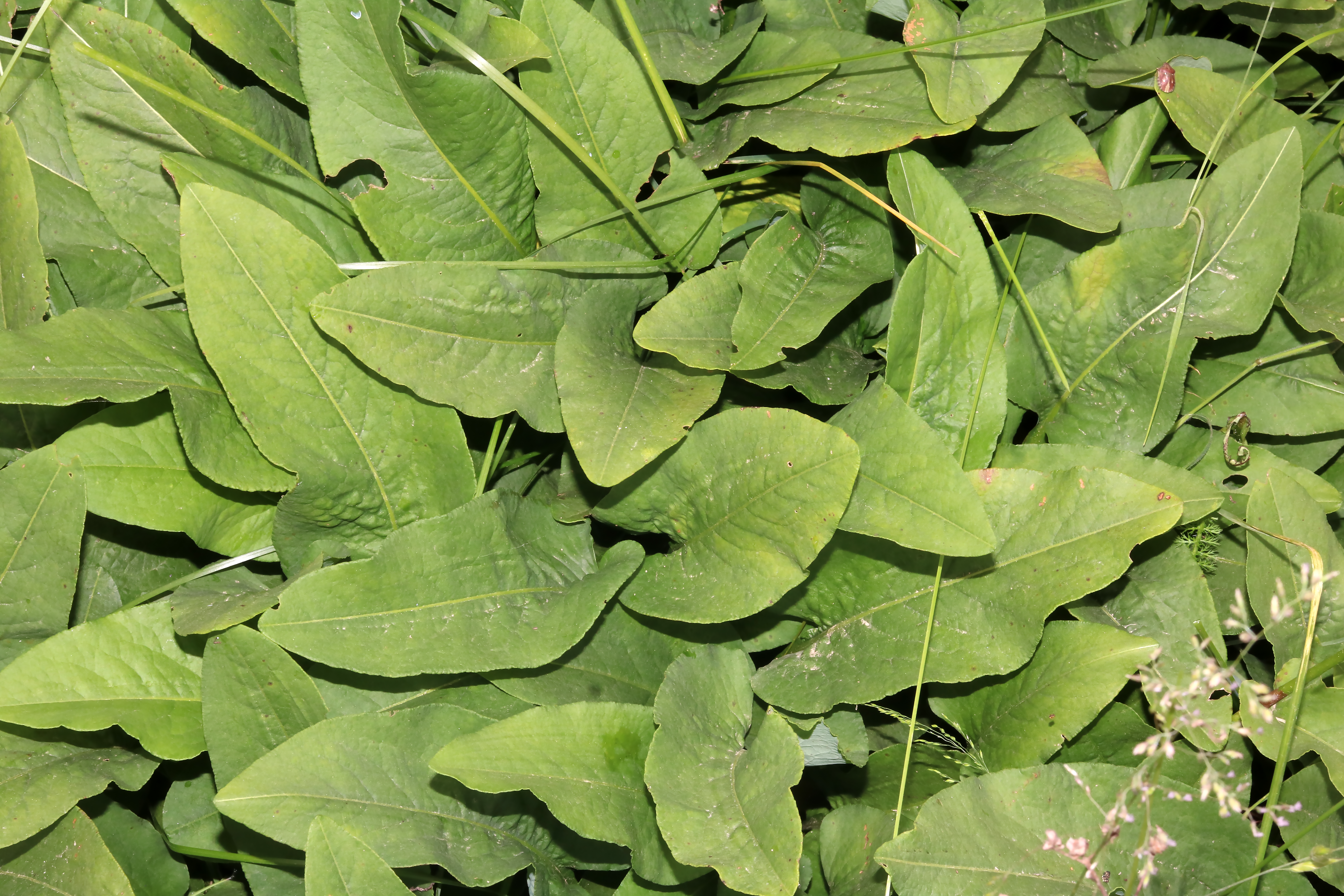
- Bistort leaves, the main ingredient in dock pudding.
- Type: Pudding
- Place of origin: England
- Region or state: Calder Valley, West Yorkshire
- Main ingredients: Bistort leaves, oatmeal, nettles, onions

Dock pudding is a West Yorkshire dish produced chiefly in the Calder Valley area. Its main ingredients are the leaves of bistort (sometimes called "gentle dock" or "Passion dock", though it is not a member of the genus Rumex), together with oatmeal, nettles, onion, and seasoning to taste. Other ingredients are added but each personal family recipe does differ. Traditionally the "pudding" is fried in a frying pan along with bacon. Starting in 1971, an annual World Dock Pudding Championship is held at the local community centre in the village of Mytholmroyd.

The dish is most strongly associated with Calderdale in modern times, but is not unique to that region in history. Like tansy cakes, dock pudding has long been associated with Eastertide, and is still prepared as a Lenten dish in northern England.

== See also ==
- Laver bread
- English cuisine
