= Bistorta incana =

Scientific classification
- Kingdom: Plantae
- Clade: Tracheophytes
- Clade: Angiosperms
- Clade: Eudicots
- Order: Caryophyllales
- Family: Polygonaceae
- Genus: Bistorta
- Species: B. incana

Binomial name
- Bistorta incana (Nakai) Nakai ex T. Mori

Synonyms
- Polygonum bistorta var. incanum Nakai

Species of flowering plant

Bistorta incana is a species of flowering plant in the family Polygonaceae, native to Korea and Manchuria.

== Taxonomy ==
Bistorta incana was first described in 1911 by Takenoshin Nakai as Polygonum bistorta var. incanum. In 1922, he elevated it to species status.

== Description ==
It is an erec perennial herb growing to a height of 1 m. The stem leaves are opposite, ovate- lanceolate, have short or no petioles, and the margins are entire. The backs of the leaves are covered with dense white hairs, giving them a silvery white color. The light-red flowers bloom from June to September, and hang in spikes at the ends of flower stalks that are 80-100 cm long. The fruit is a triangular achene.

In Korea, it is native to Yanggang-do and Hamgyeong-do, and grows in alpine meadows.

== Uses ==
In Korea, it is used as a dye, and its rhizome is used as medicine.
