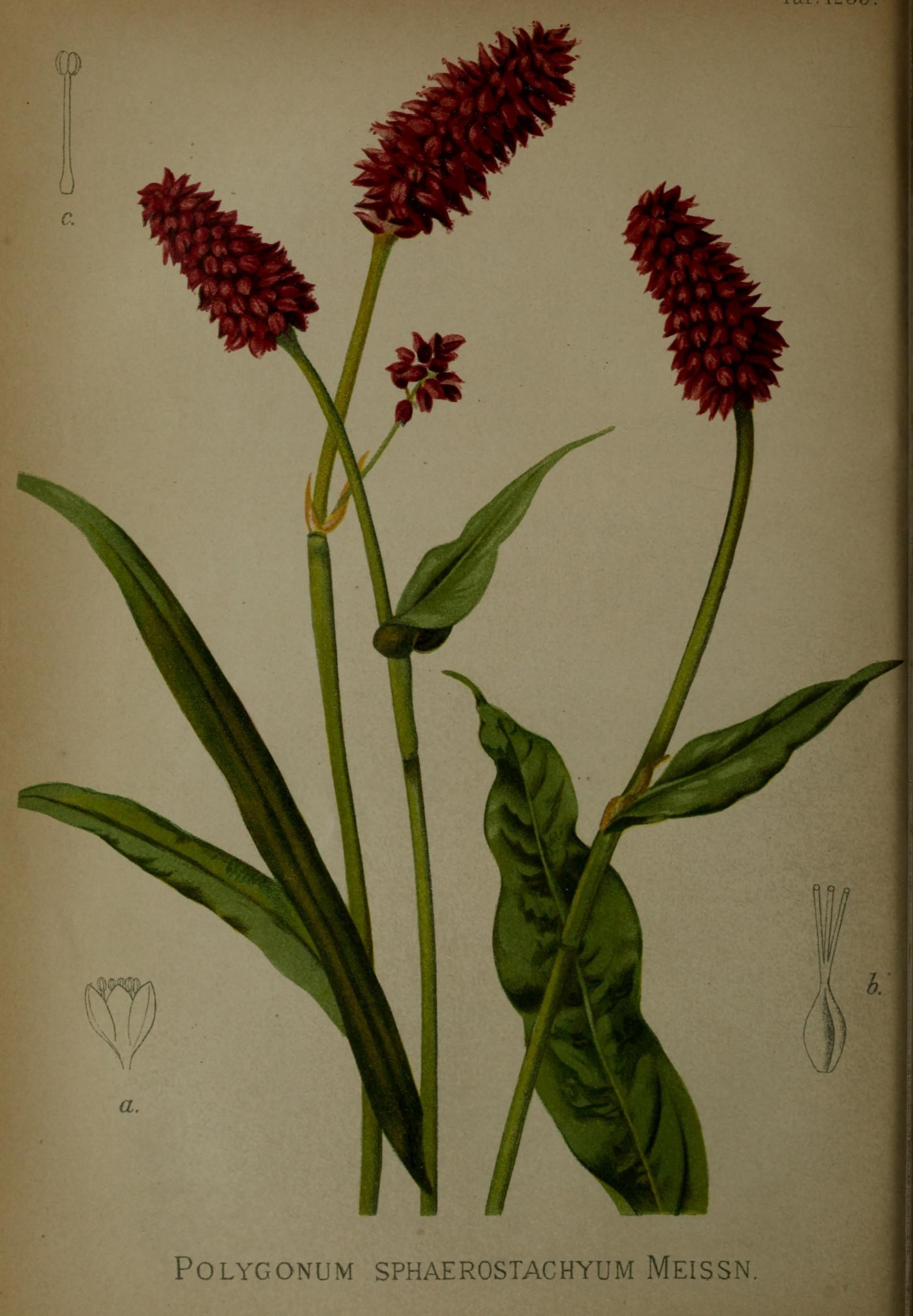

Scientific classification
- Kingdom: Plantae
- Clade: Tracheophytes
- Clade: Angiosperms
- Clade: Eudicots
- Order: Caryophyllales
- Family: Polygonaceae
- Genus: Bistorta
- Species: B. macrophylla

Binomial name
- Bistorta macrophylla (D.Don) Sojak, 1974

Synonyms
- Persicaria macrophylla (D.Don) Cubey; Polygonum macrophyllum D. Don; Bistorta sphaerostachya (Meisn.) Greene; Polygonum sphaerostachyum Meisn.

= Bistorta macrophylla =

Species of plant

Bistorta macrophylla (syn. Polygonum macrophyllum, syn. Persicaria macrophylla) is a flowering plant species in the buckwheat family Polygonaceae. It is native to mountain regions of West and South China (Gansu, Guizhou, Henan, Hubei, Qinghai, Shaanxi, Sichuan, Tibet, Yunnan), Bhutan, Nepal, northern India (Himachal Pradesh, Uttarakhand), and Pakistan.

In Nepal, its rhizomes are dried to be used as food.

In India (Uttarakhand), its leaves are used in traditional medicine to treat wounds. The paste made from the roots is given to infants for stomach problems.

Vernacular names:

- English: red knotweed or large leaved knotweed
- Chinese: 圆穗拳参; pinyin: yuan sui quan shen
- Nepali: Dalle ghans, Dalle jhar
- India: Kukhri, Chhota ninayin, Kande-re-ninai

Compounds (-)-Epicatechin-5-O-beta-D-glucopyranoside, (+)-catechin-7-O-beta-D-glucopyranoside, 1-(3-O-beta-D-glucopyranosyl 4,5-dihydroxy-phenyl)-ethanone, (-)-epicatechin, chlorogenic acid and gallic acid can be found in the species.
