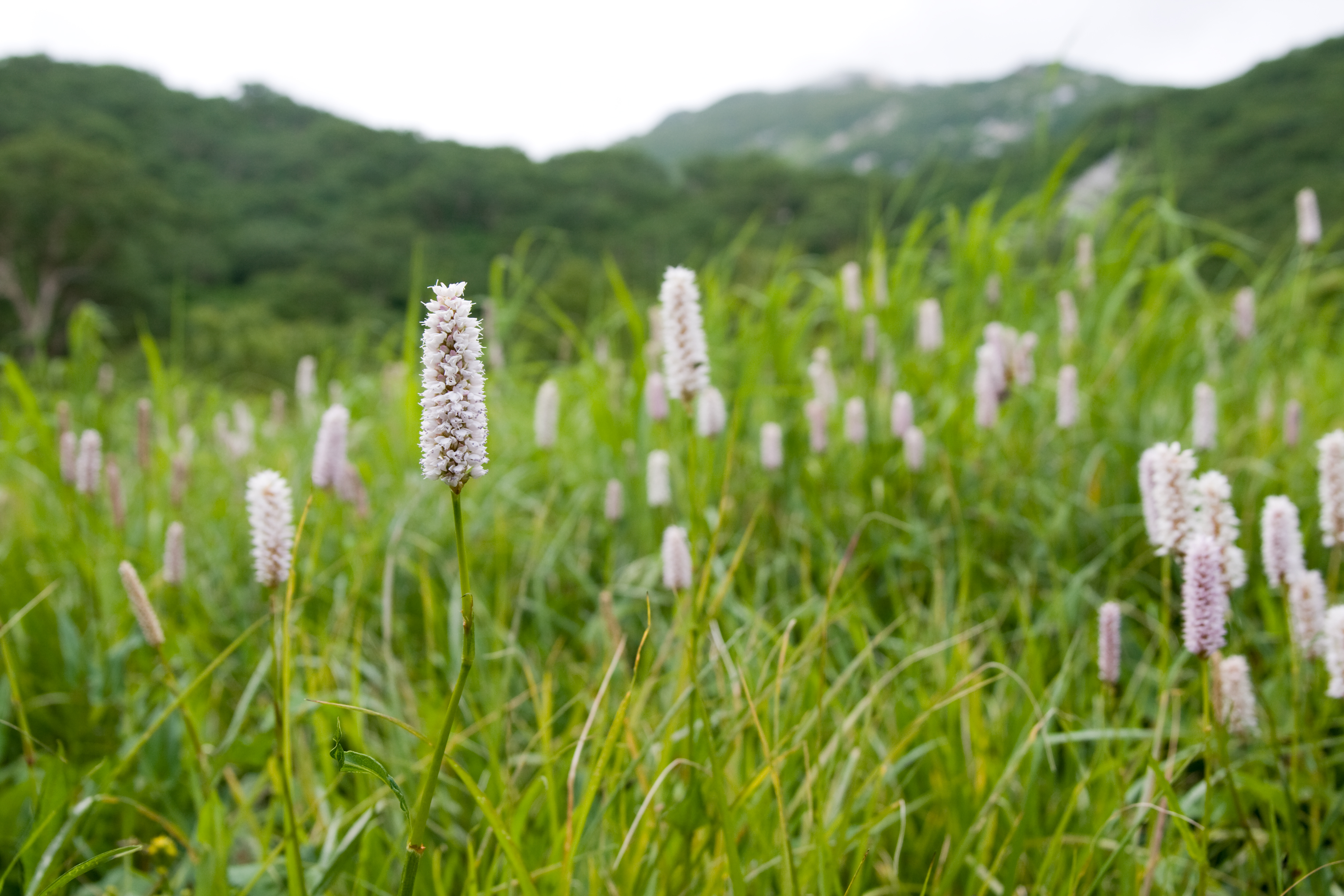
- Bistorta officinalis in Japan

Scientific classification
- Kingdom: Plantae
- Clade: Embryophytes
- Clade: Tracheophytes
- Clade: Spermatophytes
- Clade: Angiosperms
- Clade: Eudicots
- Order: Caryophyllales
- Family: Polygonaceae
- Subfamily: Polygonoideae
- Genus: Bistorta (L.) Scop.

Synonyms
- Colubrina Montandon

= Bistorta =

Genus of flowering plants in the knotweed family

Bistorta is a genus of flowering plants in the family Polygonaceae. As of February 2019 about 40 species are accepted. It has been supported as a separate clade by molecular phylogenetic analysis. Bistorta species are native throughout much of the Northern Hemisphere, as far south as Mexico in North America and Thailand in Asia.

== Description ==
Species of Bistorta are perennial herbaceous plants. Their roots are fibrous, forming rhizomes. They have erect, unbranched stems. Their leaves are usually longer than wide, mostly basal, but with some arranged alternately on the stems. The inflorescences are spikelike. The individual flowers have five white to purple-pink (rarely red) tepals. The flowers are bisexual, although the 5–8 stamens are sometimes poorly developed. There are three styles. The fruits are in the form of achenes, that are brown or dark brown, unwinged, and three-angled. The monoploid number of chromosomes, x, is 11 or 12.

== Taxonomy ==
In 1753, Carl Linnaeus divided up his genus Polygonum into unranked groups, one of which was Bistorta. In 1754, Giovanni Antonio Scopoli elevated Bistorta to a genus.

Bistorta is placed in the subfamily Polygonoideae, tribe Persicarieae, along with the genera Koenigia and Persicaria. A 2015 molecular phylogenetic study suggested that the tribes in Polygonoideae were related as shown in the following cladogram.

- Polygonoideae
  - Oxygoneae
  - - Persicarieae (Bistorta, Koenigia, Persicaria)
    - - Fagopyreae
      - - Pteroxygoneae
        - - Calligoneae
          - - Rumiceae
            - Polygoneae

Within the tribe Persicarieae, Bistorta is most closely related to Koenigia:

- Persicarieae
  - Persicaria
  - - Bistorta
    - Koenigia

=== Species ===
As of November 2025, Plants of the World Online accepted the following 44 species and one natural hybrid.

- Bistorta abukumensis Yonek., Iketsu & H.Ohashi
- Bistorta affinis (D.Don) Greene
- Bistorta albiflora Miyam. & H.Ohba
- Bistorta alopecuroides (Turcz. ex Kom.) Nakai
- Bistorta amplexicaulis (D.Don) Greene
- Bistorta arunachalensis M.Das & S.S.Dash
- Bistorta attenuata Kom.
- Bistorta attenuatifolia Miyam. & H.Ohba
- Bistorta bistortoides (Pursh) Small
- Bistorta burmanica Yonek. & H.Ohashi
- Bistorta carnea (K.Koch) Kom.
- Bistorta coriacea (Sam.) Yonek. & H.Ohashi
- Bistorta diopetes H.Ohba & S.Akiyama
- Bistorta elliptica (Willd. ex Spreng.) V.V.Petrovsky, D.F.Murray & Elven
- Bistorta emodi (Meisn.) H.Hara
- Bistorta griersonii Yonek. & H.Ohashi
- Bistorta griffithii (Hook.f.) Grierson
- Bistorta hayachinensis (Makino) H.Gross
- Bistorta honanensis (H.W.Kung) Yonek. & H.Ohashi
- Bistorta incana (Nakai) T.Mori
- Bistorta jaljalensis H.Ohba & S.Akiyama
- Bistorta krascheninnikovii N.A.Ivanova
- Bistorta longispicata Yonek. & H.Ohashi
- Bistorta ludlowii Yonek. & H.Ohashi
- Bistorta macrophylla (D.Don) Soják
- Bistorta manshuriensis (Petrov ex Kom.) Kom.
- Bistorta milletii H.Lév.
- Bistorta milletioides H.Ohba & S.Akiyama
- Bistorta ochotensis Kom.
- Bistorta officinalis Delarbre
- Bistorta perpusilla (Hook.f.) Greene
- Bistorta plumosa (Small) Greene
- Bistorta purpureonervosa (A.J.Li) Yonek. & H.Ohashi
- Bistorta × rhaetica (Brügger) Dostál
- Bistorta rubra Yonek. & H.Ohashi
- Bistorta sherei H.Ohba & S.Akiyama
- Bistorta sinomontana (Sam.) Miyam.
- Bistorta subscaposa (Diels) Petrov
- Bistorta suffulta (Maxim.) Greene ex H.Gross
- Bistorta tenuicaulis (Bisset & S.Moore) Nakai
- Bistorta tenuifolia (H.W.Kung) Miyam. & H.Ohba
- Bistorta tubistipulis Miyam. & H.Ohba
- Bistorta vacciniifolia (Wall. ex Meisn.) Greene
- Bistorta vivipara (L.) Delarbre
- Bistorta yunnanensis H.Gross
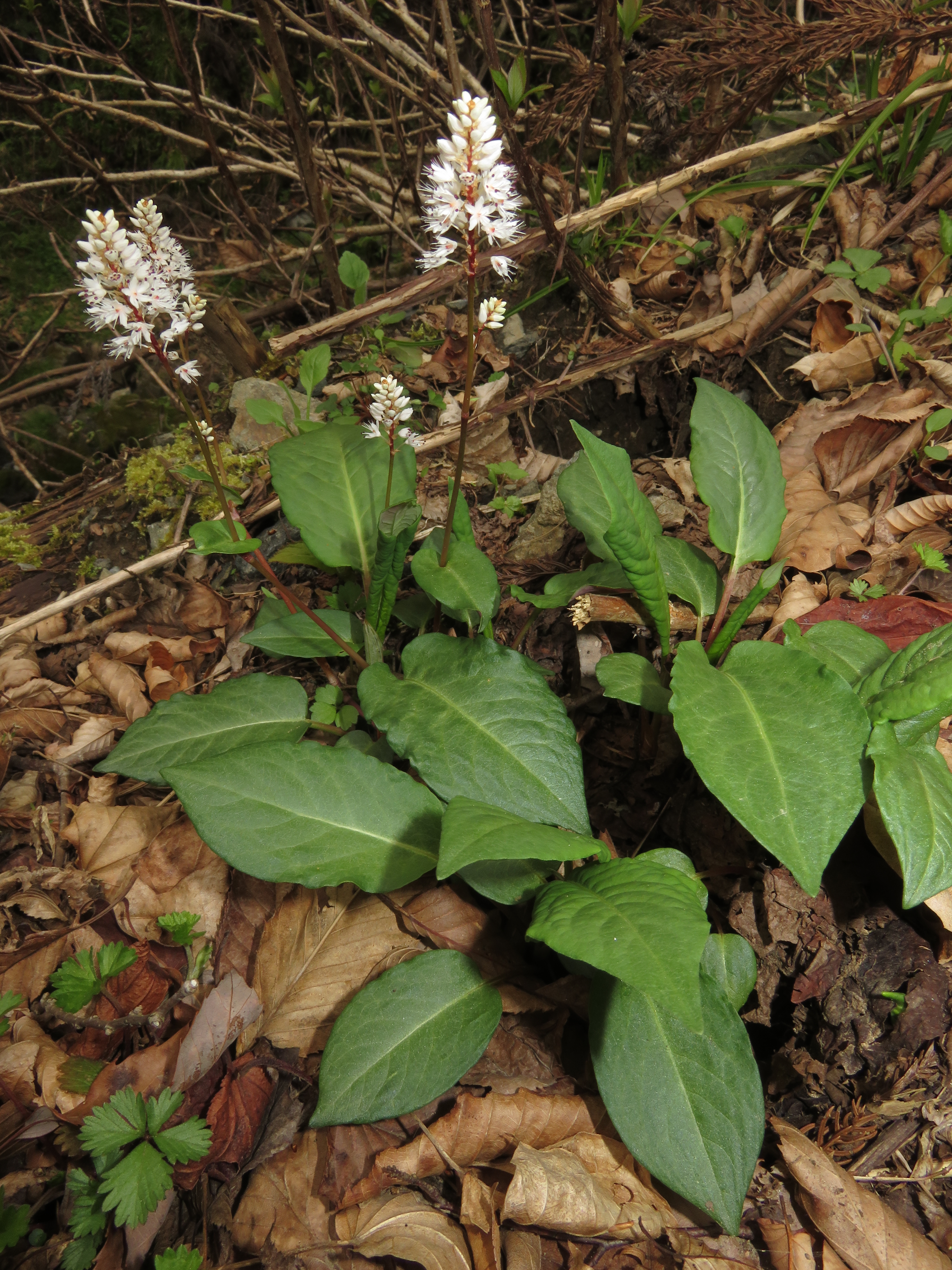
Bistorta abukumensis

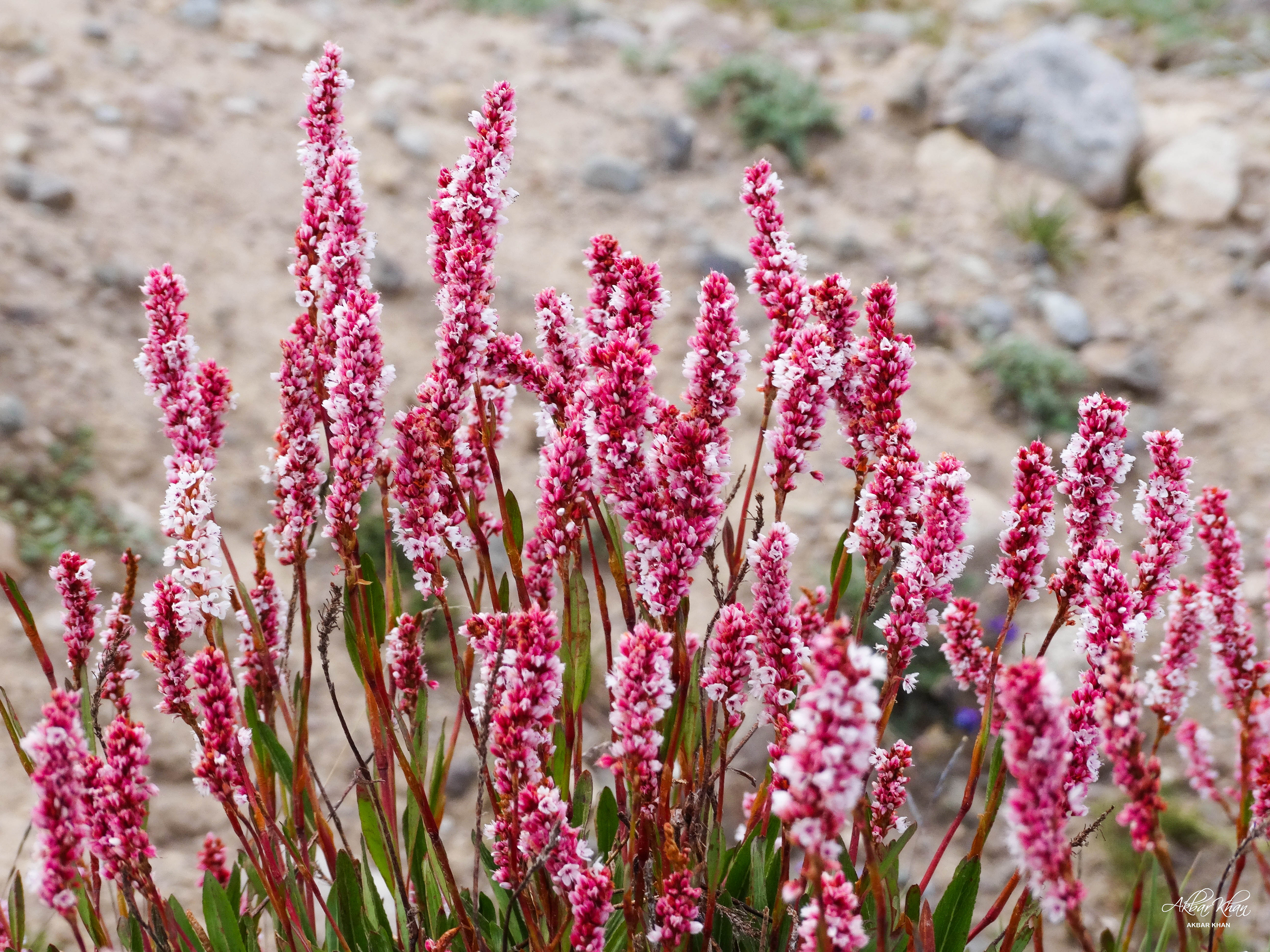
Bistorta affinis

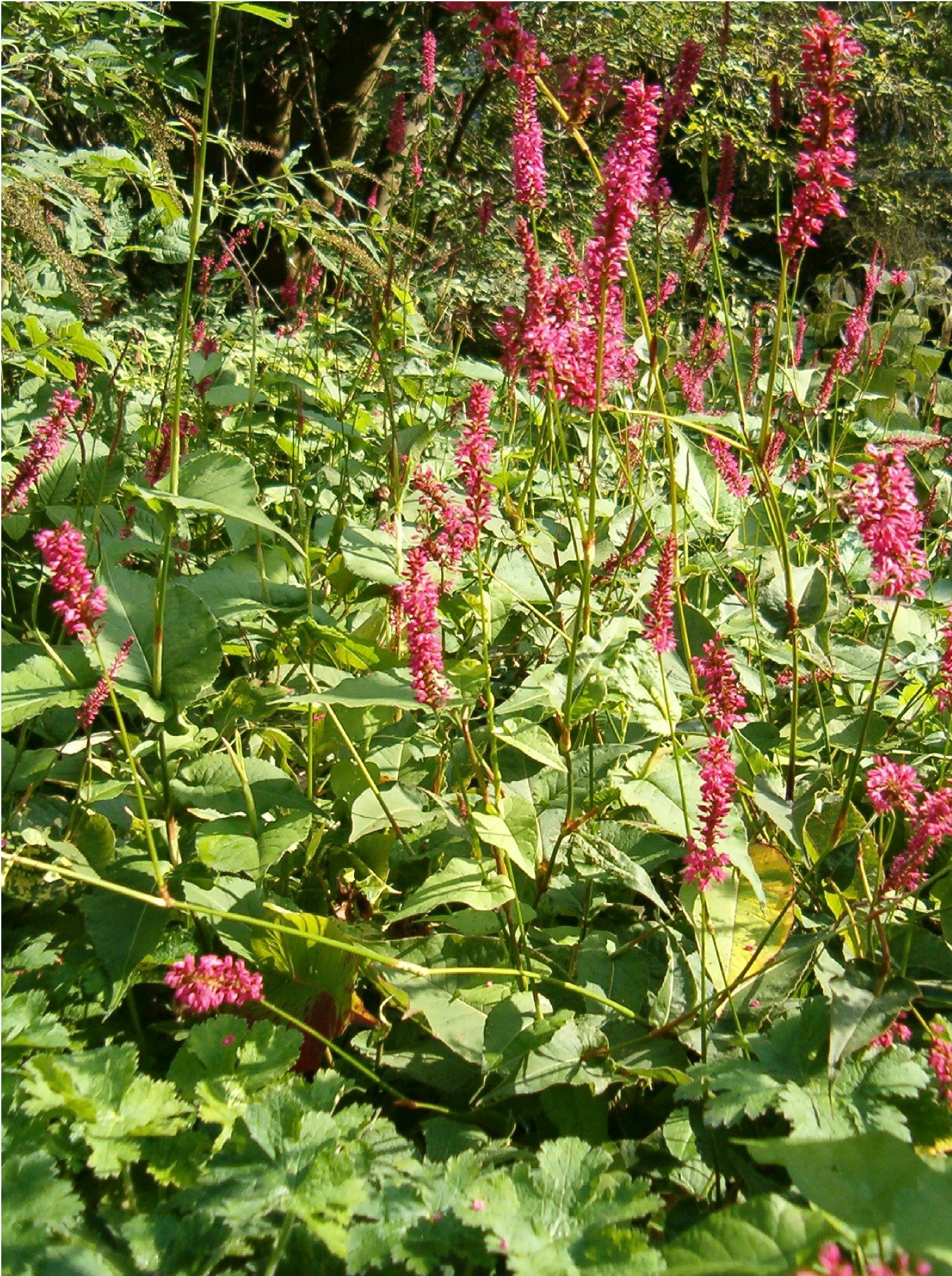
Bistorta amplexicaulis

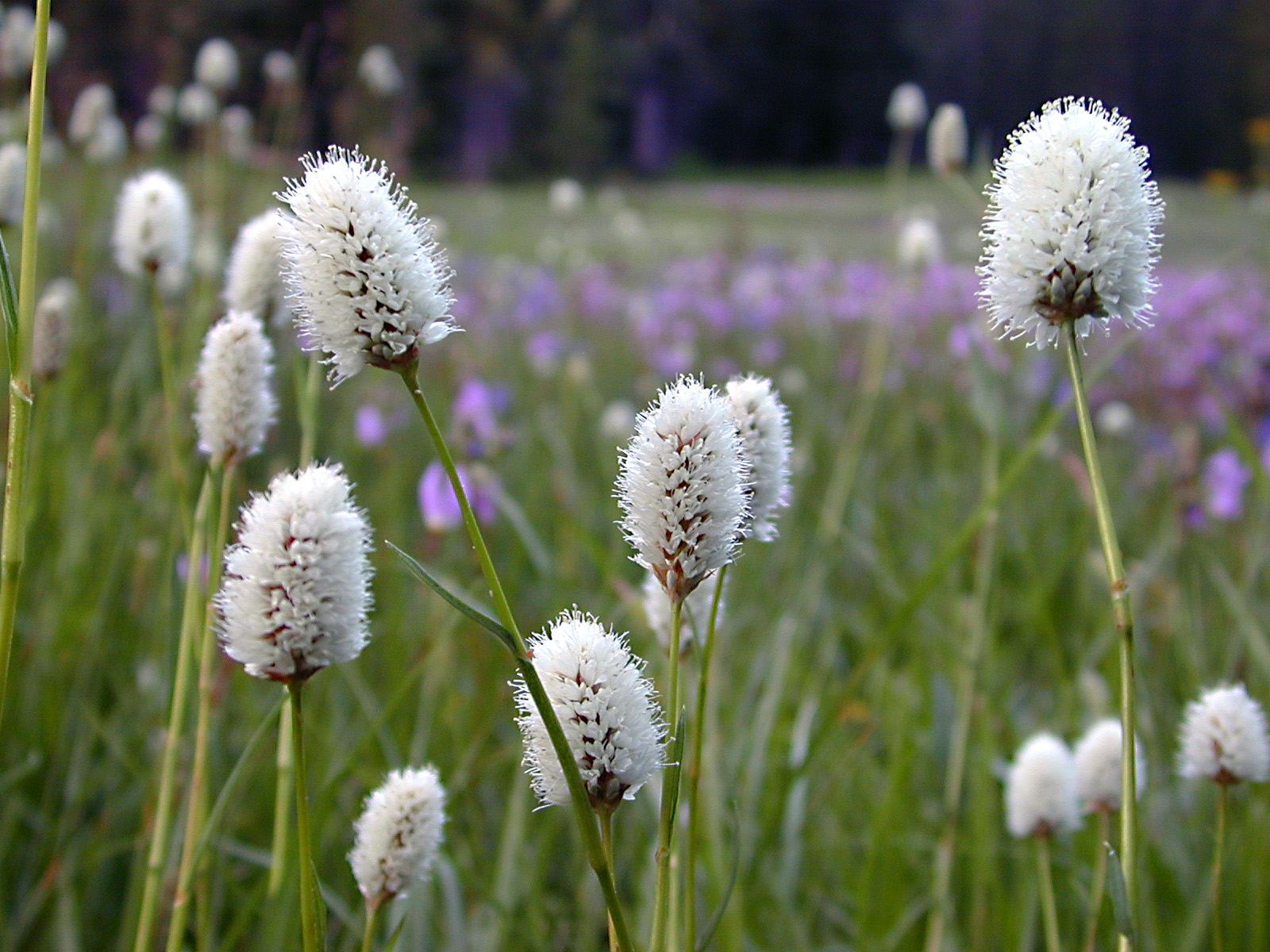
Bistorta bistortoides

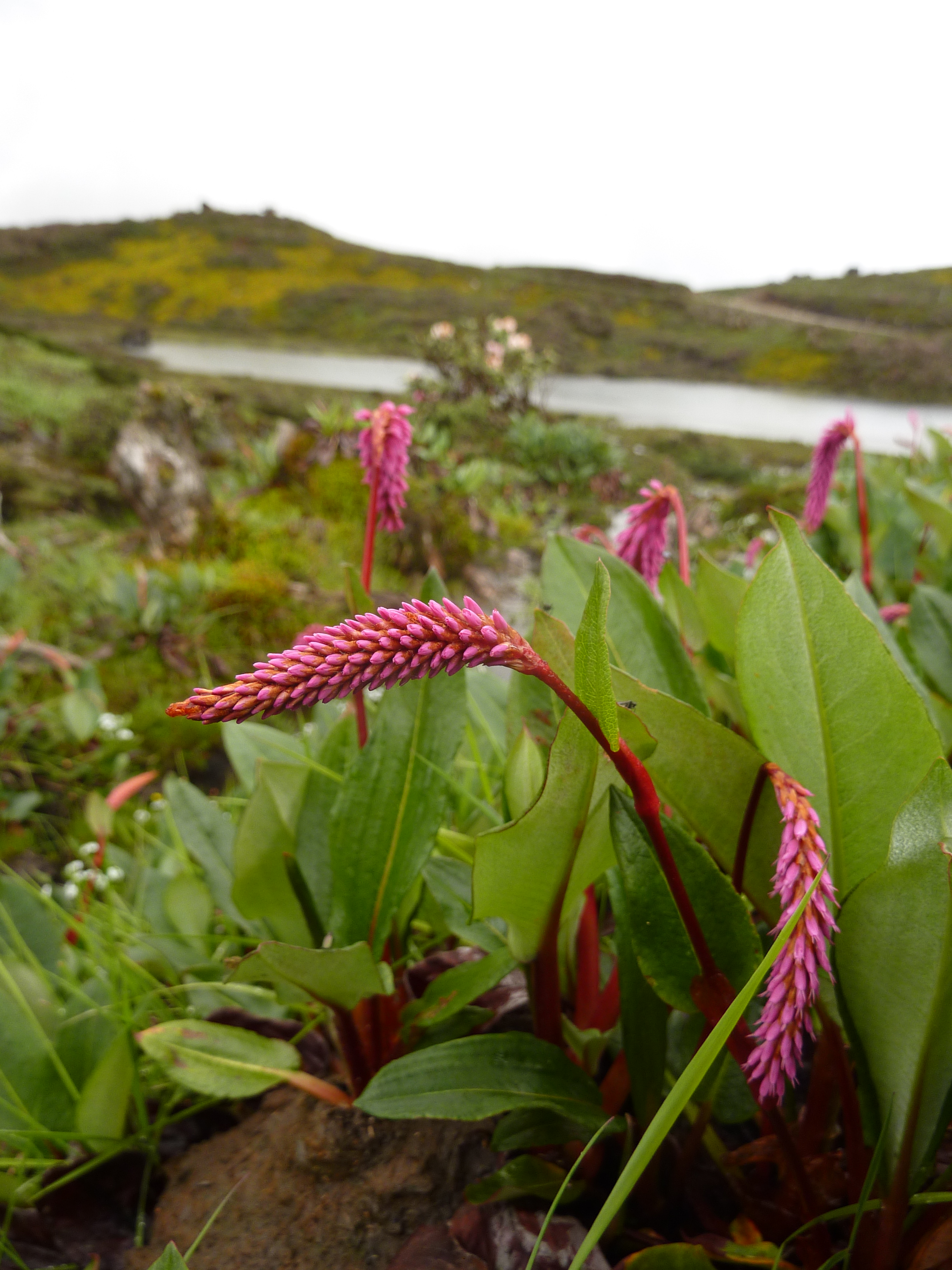
Bistorta macrophylla

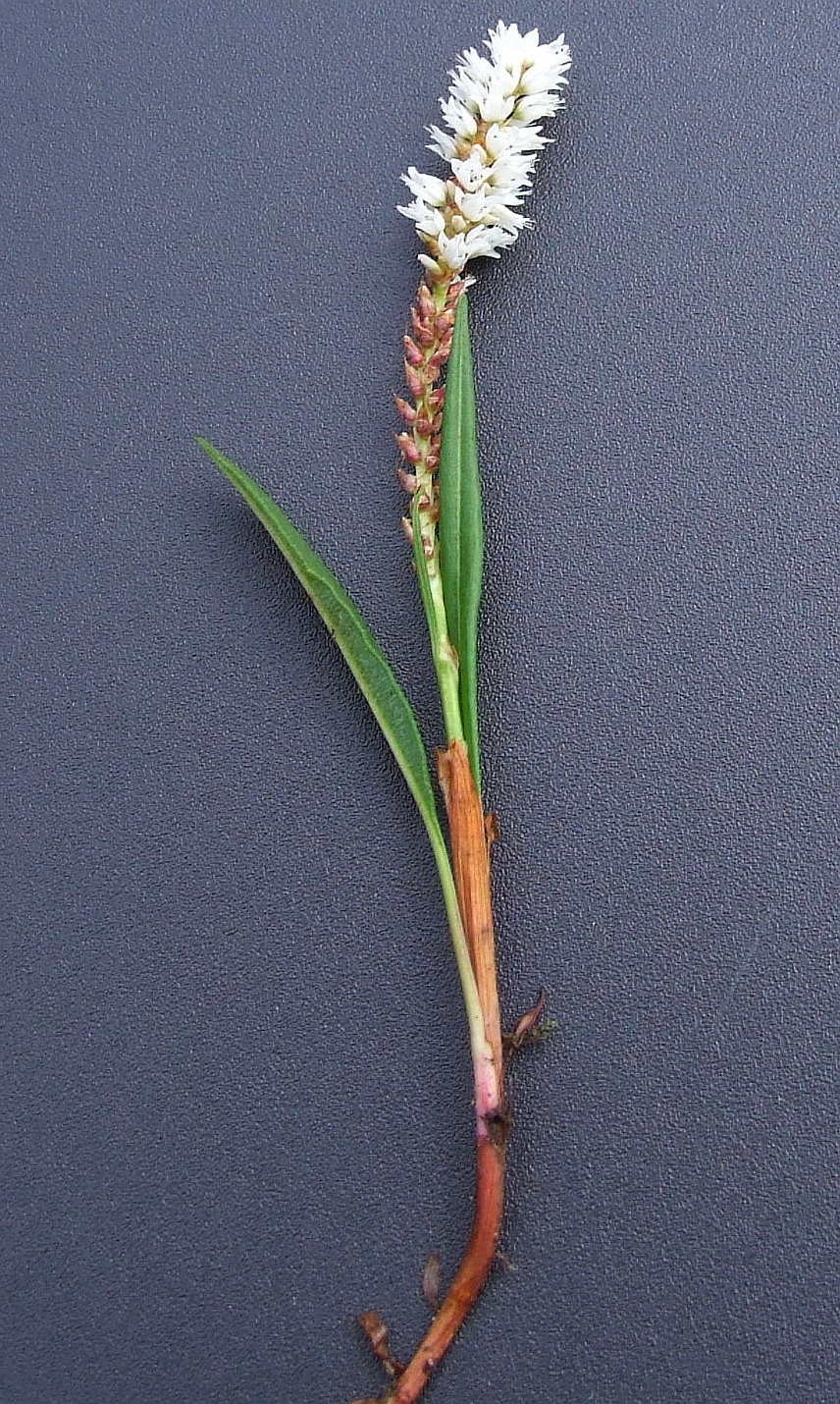
Bistorta vivipara
