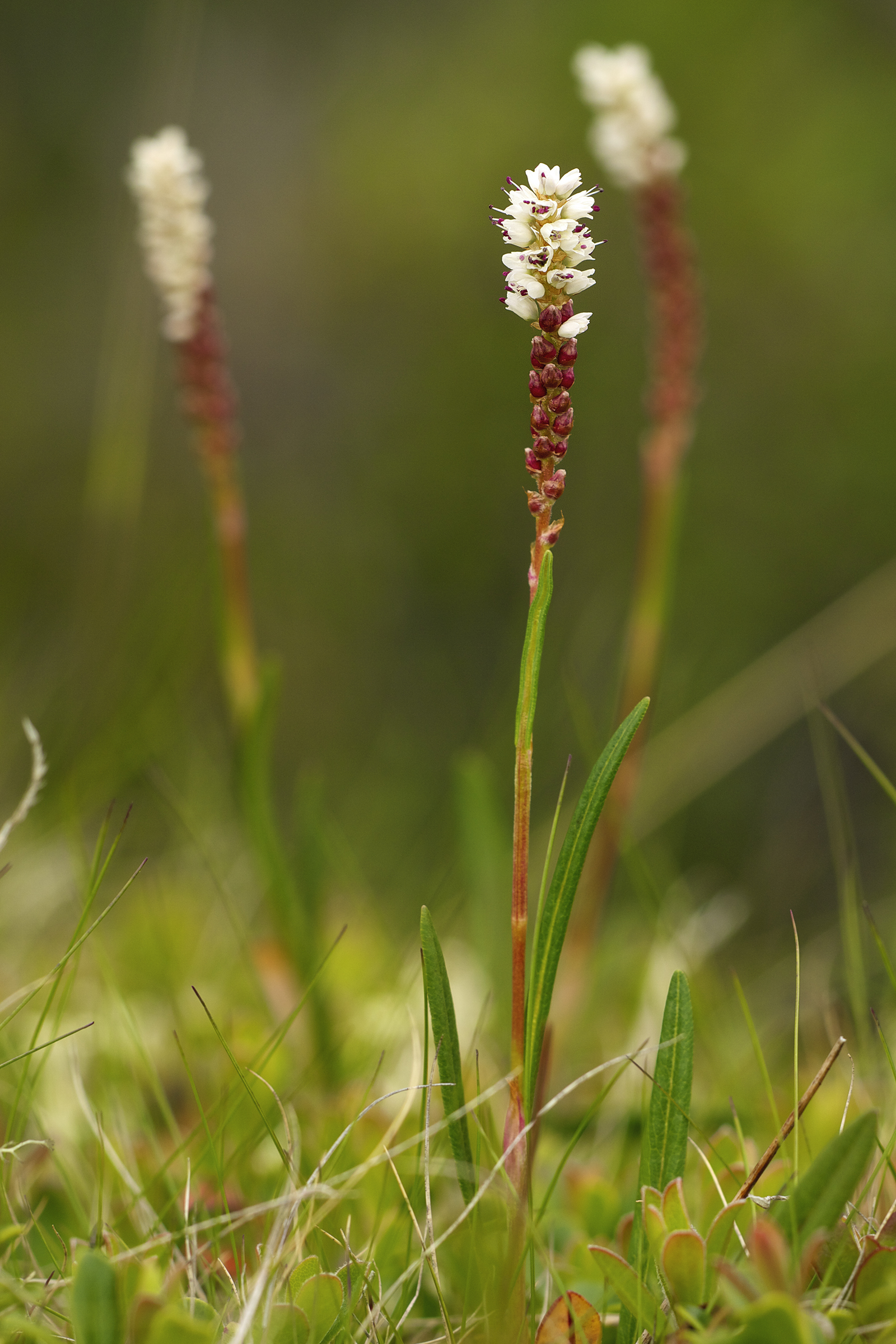
- Bistorta vivipara

Conservation status
- Secure (NatureServe)

Scientific classification
- Kingdom: Plantae
- Clade: Embryophytes
- Clade: Tracheophytes
- Clade: Angiosperms
- Clade: Eudicots
- Order: Caryophyllales
- Family: Polygonaceae
- Genus: Bistorta
- Species: B. vivipara

Binomial name
- Bistorta vivipara (L.) Delarbre

Synonyms
- List: Bistorta americana Raf.; Bistorta bulbifera (Royle ex Bab.) Greene; Bistorta insularis Soják; Bistorta littoralis Greene; Bistorta macounii (Small ex Macoun) Greene; Bistorta ophioglossa Greene; Bistorta scopulina Greene; Bistorta vivipara var. alpina Gray; Bistorta vivipara var. angustifolia Nakai; Bistorta vivipara subsp. fugax (Small) Soják; Bistorta vivipara subsp. macounii (Small ex Macoun) Soják; Bistorta vivipara f. ramosa Nakai; Bistorta vivipara var. roessleri (Beck) F.Maek.; Bistorta vivipara f. roessleri (Beck) Kitag.; Colubrina vivipara (L.) Montandon; Persicaria americana (Meisn.) Ohki; Persicaria sagittata var. americana (Meisn.) Miyabe; Persicaria vivipara (L.) Ronse Decr.; Polygonum angustifolium D.Don; Polygonum blancheanum Gand.; Polygonum bracteatum Spreng.; Polygonum bulbiferum Royle ex Bab.; Polygonum camptostachys Gand.; Polygonum chevrolatii Gand.; Polygonum fugax Small; Polygonum insulare Maximova; Polygonum littorale (Greene) Fedde; Polygonum macounii Small ex Macoun; Polygonum proliferum Houtt.; Polygonum renii L.C.Wang; Polygonum sagittatum var. americanum Meisn.; Polygonum sagittatum modif. aculeolata R.Keller; Polygonum scopulinum (Greene) Fedde; Polygonum viviparum L.; Polygonum viviparum var. alpinum Wahlenb.; Polygonum viviparum f. alpinum (Wahlenb.) Polunin; Polygonum viviparum var. capitatum Torr.; Polygonum viviparum f. elatior Kurtz; Polygonum viviparum f. linearifolium J.Q.Fu; Polygonum viviparum var. macounii (Small ex Macoun) Hultén; Polygonum viviparum f. nanum Bolzon; Polygonum viviparum monstr. paniculatum Porsild; Polygonum viviparum var. pseudobistorta J.Rousseau; Polygonum viviparum f. pusillum Kurtz; Polygonum viviparum var. ramiflorum L.Villar; Polygonum viviparum f. ramosum (Nakai) T.Shimizu; Polygonum viviparum f. roessleri Beck; Polygonum viviparum var. subacaule Pursh

= Bistorta vivipara =

Alpine bistort

Plant species in the buckwheat family

Bistorta vivipara (synonym Persicaria vivipara) is a perennial herbaceous flowering plant in the knotweed and buckwheat family Polygonaceae, commonly known as alpine bistort. Scientific synonyms include Bistorta vivipara and Polygonum viviparum. It is common all over the high Arctic through Europe, North America, incl. Greenland, and temperate and tropical Asia. Its range stretches further south in high mountainous areas such as the Alps, Carpathians, Pyrenees, Caucasus, Alaska and the Tibetan Plateau.

== Taxonomy ==
Molecular phylogenetic work has demonstrated that the genus Bistorta represents a distinct lineage within the family Polygonaceae. The genus Bistorta contains at least 42 accepted species.

Bistorta vivipara was originally named Polygonum viviparum by Carl Linnaeus in 1753, placing it in the Polygonum genus. It was moved to Bistorta in 1800 by Antoine Delarbre. Other proposed moves, that did not become accepted, were to Colubrina by F. Jules Montandon in 1856 and to Persicaria by Louis-Philippe Ronse Decraene in 1988. Together with its genus it is part of the Polygonaceae family. In addition to its three homotypic synonyms from reclassification there are 45 heterotypic synonyms including varieties, forms, and 24 other species names.

Table of Synonyms
Name	Year	Notes
Bistorta americana Raf.	1837	= het.
Bistorta bulbifera (Royle ex Bab.) Greene	1904	= het.
Bistorta insularis Soják	1981	= het.
Bistorta littoralis Greene	1904	= het.
Bistorta macounii (Small ex Macoun) Greene	1904	= het.
Bistorta ophioglossa Greene	1904	= het.
Bistorta scopulina Greene	1904	= het.
Colubrina vivipara (L.) Montandon	1856	≡ hom.
Persicaria americana (Meisn.) Ohki	1926	= het.
Persicaria vivipara (L.) Ronse Decr.	1988	≡ hom.
Polygonum angustifolium D.Don	1825	= het., nom. illeg. homonym. post.
Polygonum blancheanum Gand.	1875	= het.
Polygonum bracteatum Spreng.	1827	= het.
Polygonum bulbiferum Royle ex Bab.	1838	= het.
Polygonum camptostachys Gand.	1875	= het.
Polygonum chevrolatii Gand.	1875	= het.
Polygonum fugax Small	1901	= het.
Polygonum insulare Maximova	1979	= het., nom. illeg. homonym. post.
Polygonum littorale (Greene) Fedde	1905	= het., nom. illeg. homonym. post.
Polygonum macounii Small ex Macoun	1899	= het.
Polygonum proliferum Houtt.	1777	= het.
Polygonum renii L.C.Wang	1998	= het.
Polygonum scopulinum (Greene) Fedde	1905	= het.
Polygonum viviparum L.	1753	≡ hom.
Notes: ≡ homotypic synonym; = heterotypic synonym

== Description ==
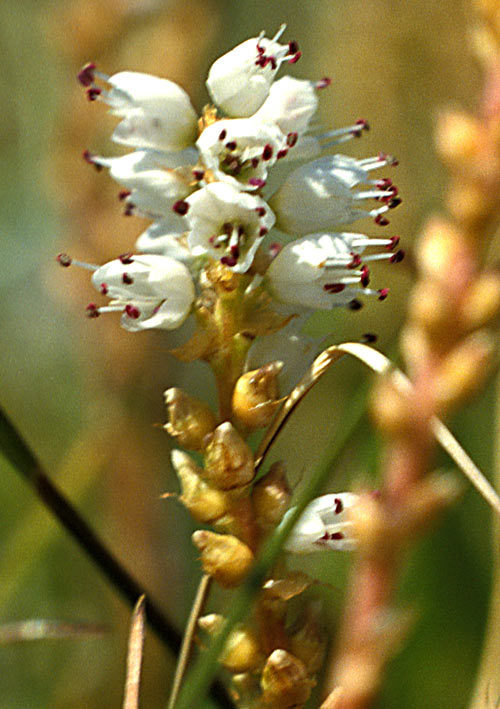
Alpine bistort flower detail

Alpine bistort is a perennial herb that grows to 5 to 15 cm (2 to 6 in) tall. It has a thick rhizomatous rootstock and an erect, unbranched, hairless stem. The leaves are hairless on the upper surfaces, but hairy and greyish-green below. The basal ones are longish-elliptical with long stalks and rounded bases; the upper ones are few and are linear and stalkless. The tiny flowers are white or pink in the upper part of the spike with five perianth segments, eight stamens with purple anthers and three fused carpels. The lower ones are replaced by bulbils. Flowers rarely produce viable seeds and reproduction is normally by the bulbils, which are small bulb-like structures that develop in the axils of the leaves and may develop into new plants. Very often, a small leaf develops when the bulbil is still attached to the mother plant. The bulbils are rich in starch and are a preferred food for rock ptarmigans (Lagopus mutus) and reindeer; they are also occasionally used by Arctic peoples. Alpine bistort flowers in June and July.

== Habitat ==
Alpine bistort grows in many different plant communities, very often in abundance. Typical habitats include moist short grassland, yards, the edges of tracks, and nutrient-rich fens.

As with many other alpine plants, Alpine bistort is slow-growing and produces embryonic buds one year that grow and open a few years after their formation (flower preformation), with an individual leaf or inflorescence taking three to four years to reach maturity from the time the buds are formed.

== Mycorrhiza ==
Alpine bistort has been shown to form an ectomycorrhizal root symbiosis with fungi.

== Uses ==
The bulbils can be stripped from the lower flower stalks and eaten raw. The young roots are edible raw, while older ones must be cooked. The young leaves can be eaten raw or cooked.

The roots are eaten in Russia, especially by the Samoyed peoples.

== In place names ==
The Kokolik River in Alaska is named after Qaqalik, the Iñupiaq name for alpine bistort.
