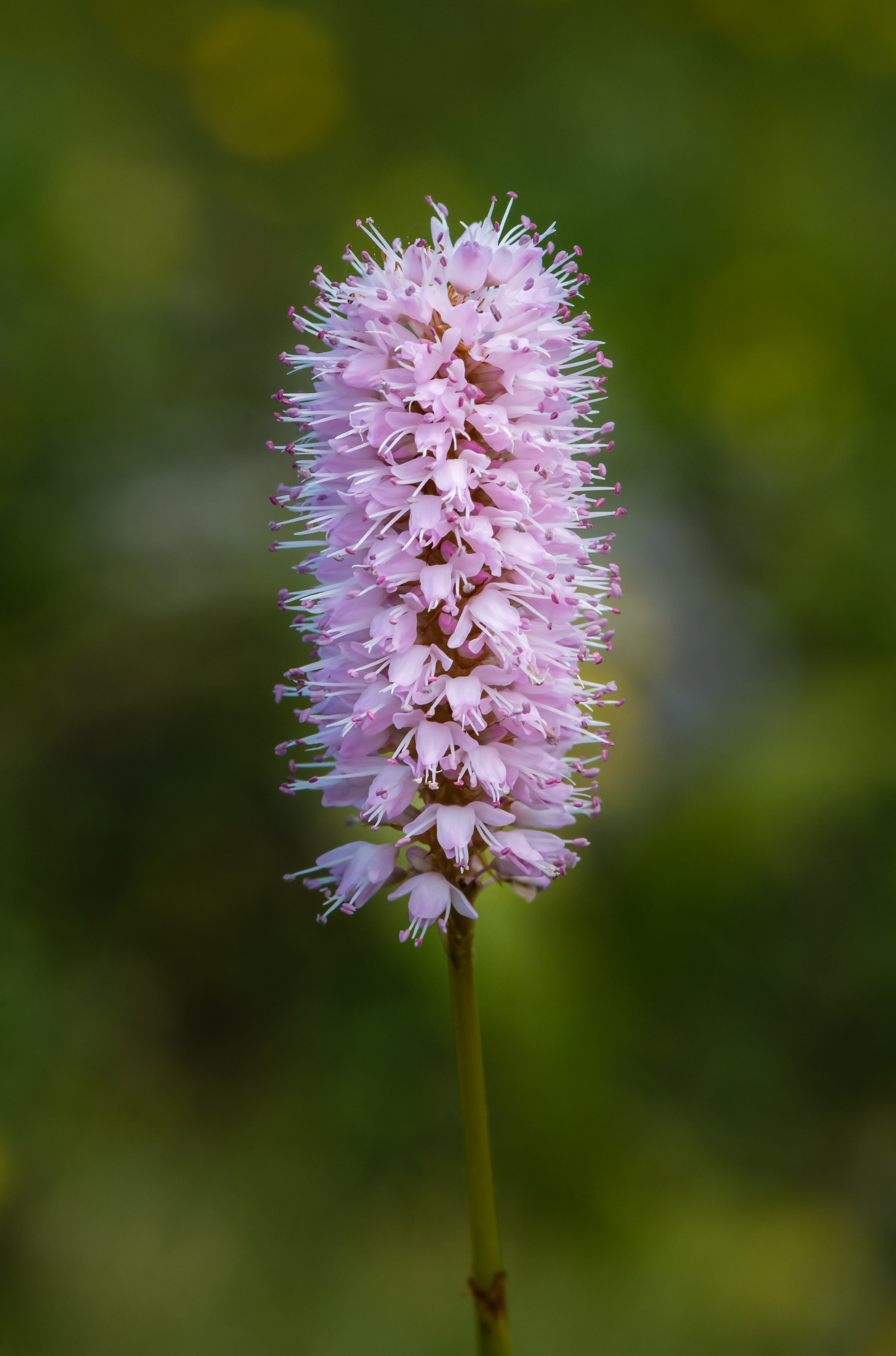

Scientific classification
- Kingdom: Plantae
- Clade: Embryophytes
- Clade: Tracheophytes
- Clade: Spermatophytes
- Clade: Angiosperms
- Clade: Eudicots
- Order: Caryophyllales
- Family: Polygonaceae
- Genus: Bistorta
- Species: B. officinalis

Binomial name
- Bistorta officinalis Delarbre

Synonyms
- Bistorta abbreviata Kom.; Bistorta carnea (K.Koch) Kom. ex Tzvelev; Bistorta confusa (Meisn.) Greene; Bistorta ensigera (Juz.) Tzvelev; Bistorta lapidosa Kitag.; Bistorta major Gray; Bistorta subauriculata Kom.; Persicaria bistorta (L.) Samp.; Polygonum abbreviatum Kom.; Polygonum bistorta L.; Polygonum carneum K.Koch; Polygonum confusum Meisn.; Polygonum ensigerum Juz.; Polygonum lapidosum (Kitag.) Kitag.

= Bistorta officinalis =

Species of flowering plant

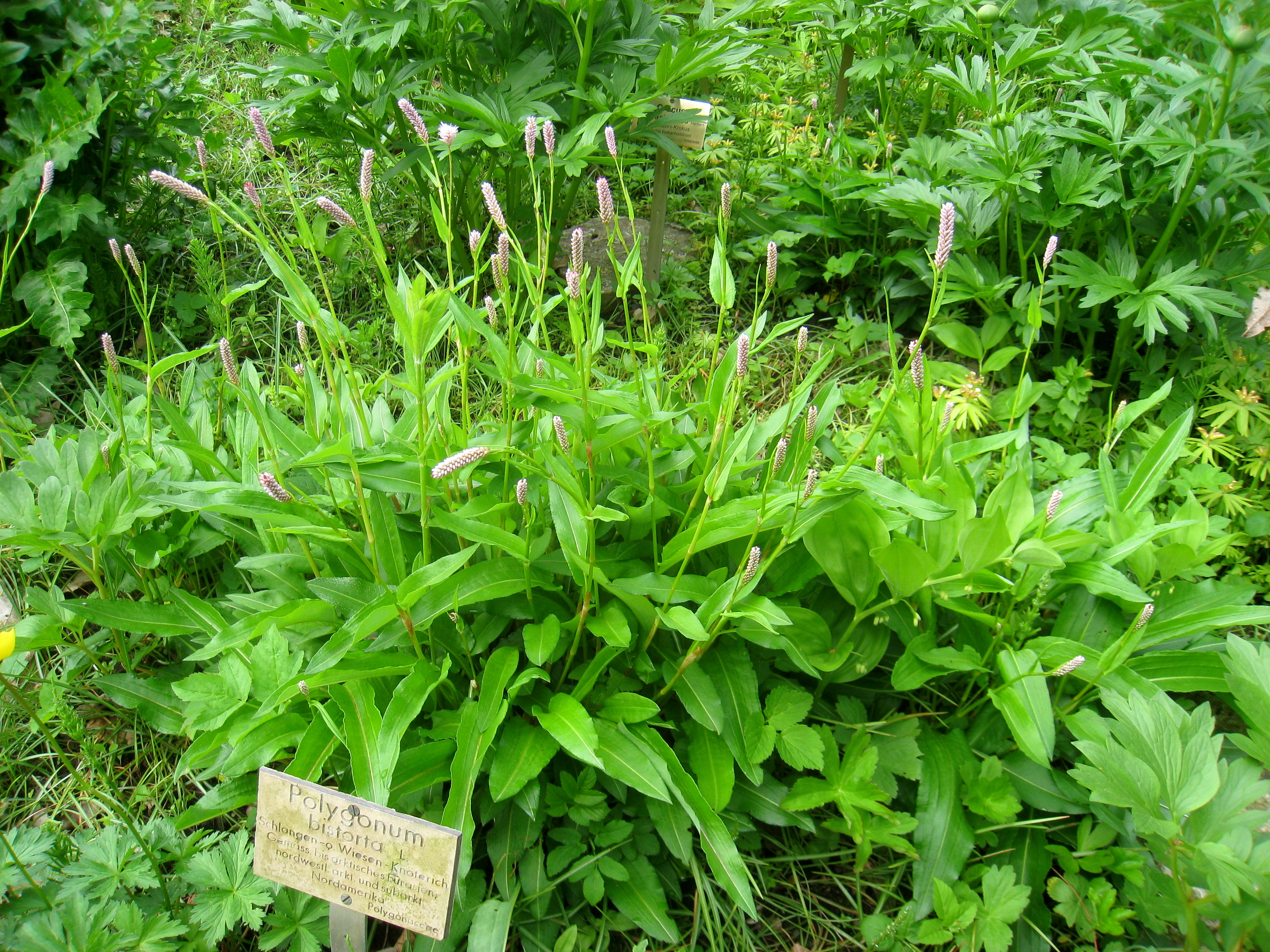
Bistorta officinalis

Bistorta officinalis (synonym Persicaria bistorta), known as bistort, common bistort, European bistort, or meadow bistort, is a species of flowering plant in the dock family Polygonaceae native to Europe and northern and western Asia. Other common names include snakeroot, snake-root, snakeweed, and Easter-ledges.

== Description ==
Bistorta officinalis is an herbaceous perennial growing to 20 to 80 centimetres (8 to 31 in) tall by 90 cm (35 in) wide. It has a thick, twisted rootstock which has probably given it its common name of snakeroot. The foliage is normally basal with a few smaller leaves produced near the lower end of the flowering stems. The leaves usually hairless; the basal ones are longish-oval with long winged stalks and rounded or heart-shaped bases; the upper ones are few and are triangular, tapered and stalkless. There are stipules at their base which are fused into a sheath surrounding the stem. The petioles are broadly winged. The inflorescence is a spike. The plant blooms from late spring into autumn, producing tall, erect, unbranched, and hairless stems ending in single terminal racemes that are club-like spikes, 5–7 cm (2–3 in) long, of rose-pink flowers. The individual flowers are pink with five perianth segments, eight stamens, three fused carpels, and three free styles. The fruit is a glossy black nut. Flowering takes place in June and July. The plant grows in moist soils and under dry conditions goes dormant, losing its foliage until adequate moisture exists again.

== Taxonomy ==
The generic placement of this species was historically in flux, having been placed in Polygonum or Persicaria but is now accepted as Bistorta.

=== Etymology ===
The Latin name bistorta, from bis ("twice") + torta ("twisted"), refers to the twisted appearance of the root.

Numerous other vernacular names have been recorded for the species in historical texts, though none is used to any extent. Many of the following refer to the plant's use in making puddings:

- Adderwort
- Dragonwort
- Easter giant
- Easter ledger
- Easter ledges
- Easter magiant
- Easter man-giant
- Gentle dock
- Great bistort
- Osterick
- Oysterloit
- Passion dock
- Patience dock
- Patient dock
- Pink pokers
- Pudding grass
- Pudding dock
- Red legs
- Snakeweed
- Twice-writhen
- Water ledges

== Distribution and habitat ==
Bistort is a native of Europe but is often cultivated and has become naturalized in other parts of the world such as in the United States in New England. It is typically found growing in moist meadows, nutrient-rich wooded swamps, forest edges, wetlands, parks, gardens, and disturbed ground.

== Cultivation ==
This species is grown as an ornamental garden plant, especially the form 'Superba' which has larger, more showy flowers, and has gained the Royal Horticultural Society's Award of Garden Merit. It is suitable for use as a marginal or in bog gardens. Bistort has been cultivated as a vegetable, its roots, leaves, and young shoots being steamed or boiled. Many of its occurrences in the wild may be as a garden escape.

== Uses ==
Bistort has been used traditionally for medicinal purposes. The roots are rich in tannic and gallic acids and both these and the leaves have been used to treat wounds.

In Northern England, the plant was used to make a bitter pudding in Lent from a combination of the leaves, oatmeal, egg, and other herbs. It is the principal ingredient of dock pudding or Easter-Ledge pudding. The root of Bistort can be used to produce an astringent that was used in medicine. The roots are also eaten in Russia and northern Asia.

== Gallery ==
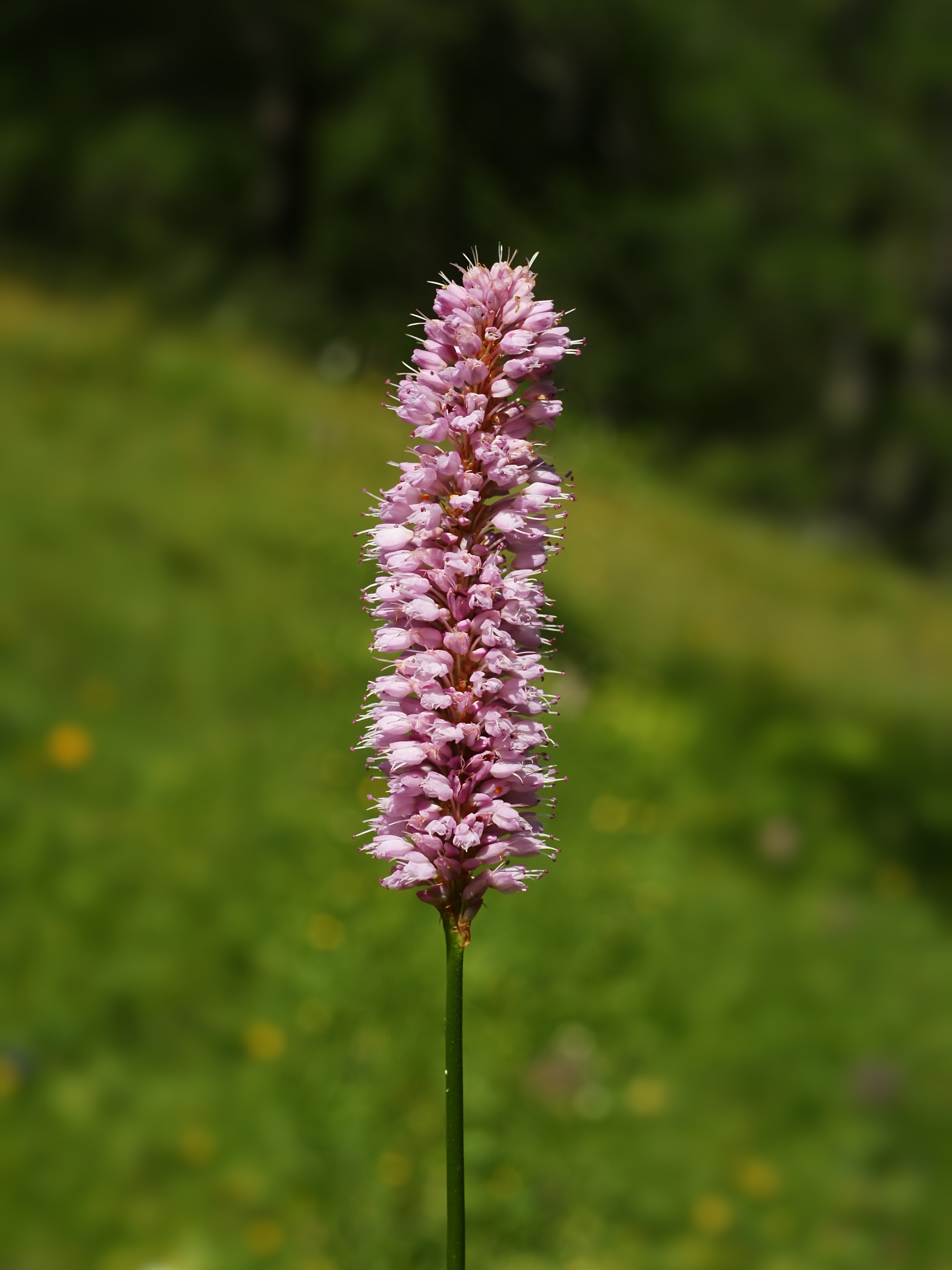
Common bistorta, in Valais, Switzerland

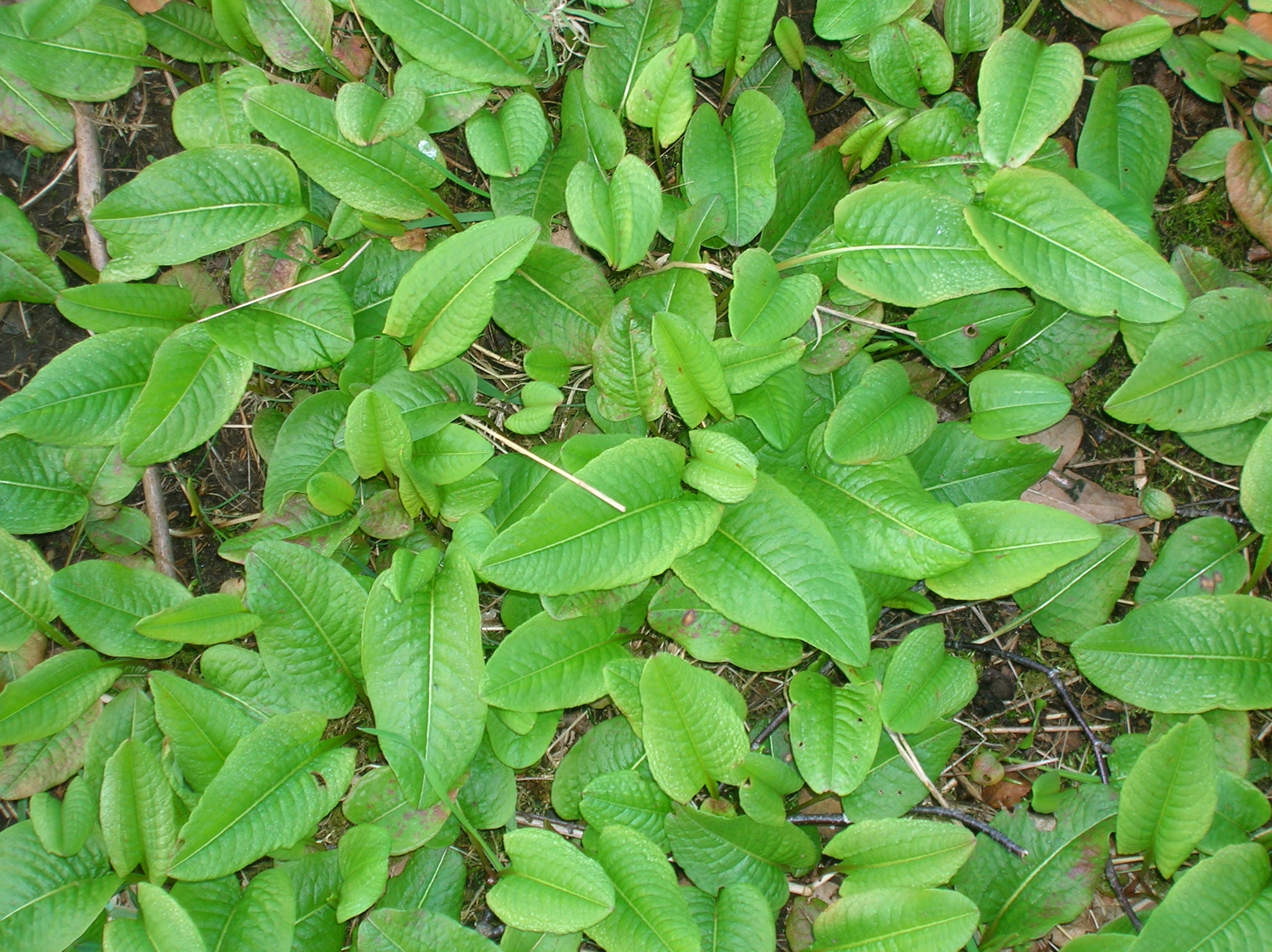
Bistort or Easter Ledges in the spring in Scotland

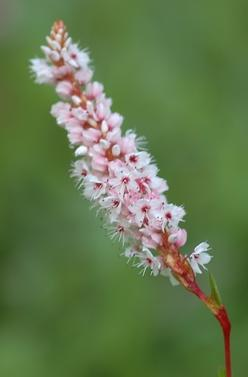
Common bistort stem

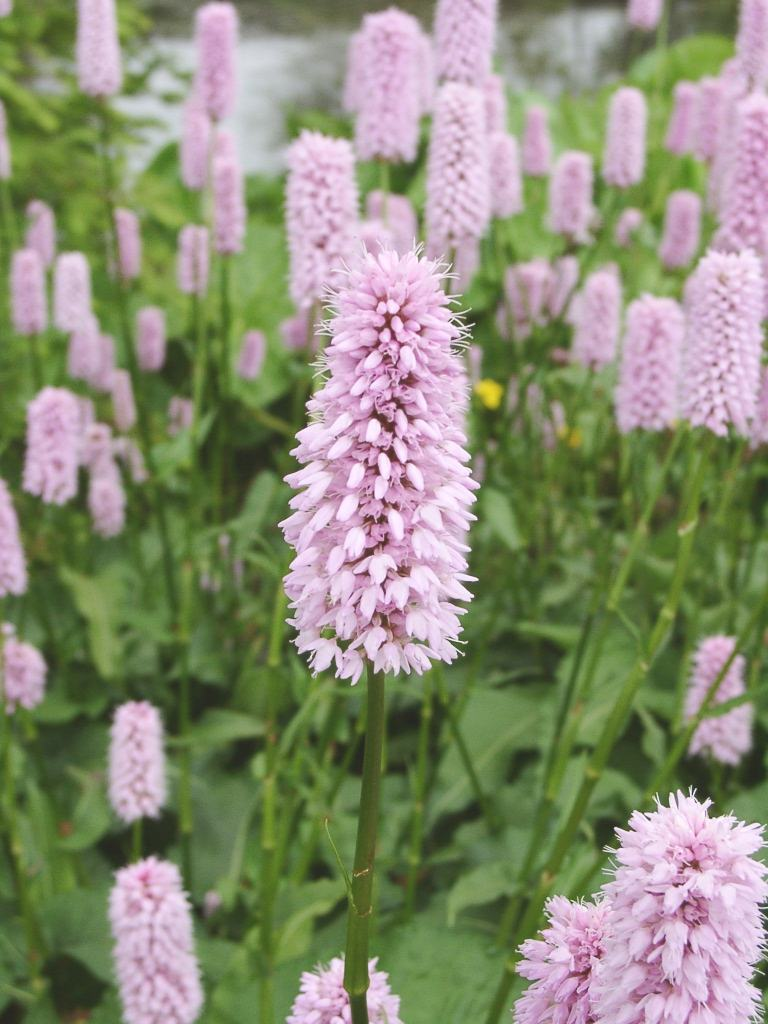
The large-flowered cultivar Bistorta officinalis 'Superba' is grown as an ornamental plant.

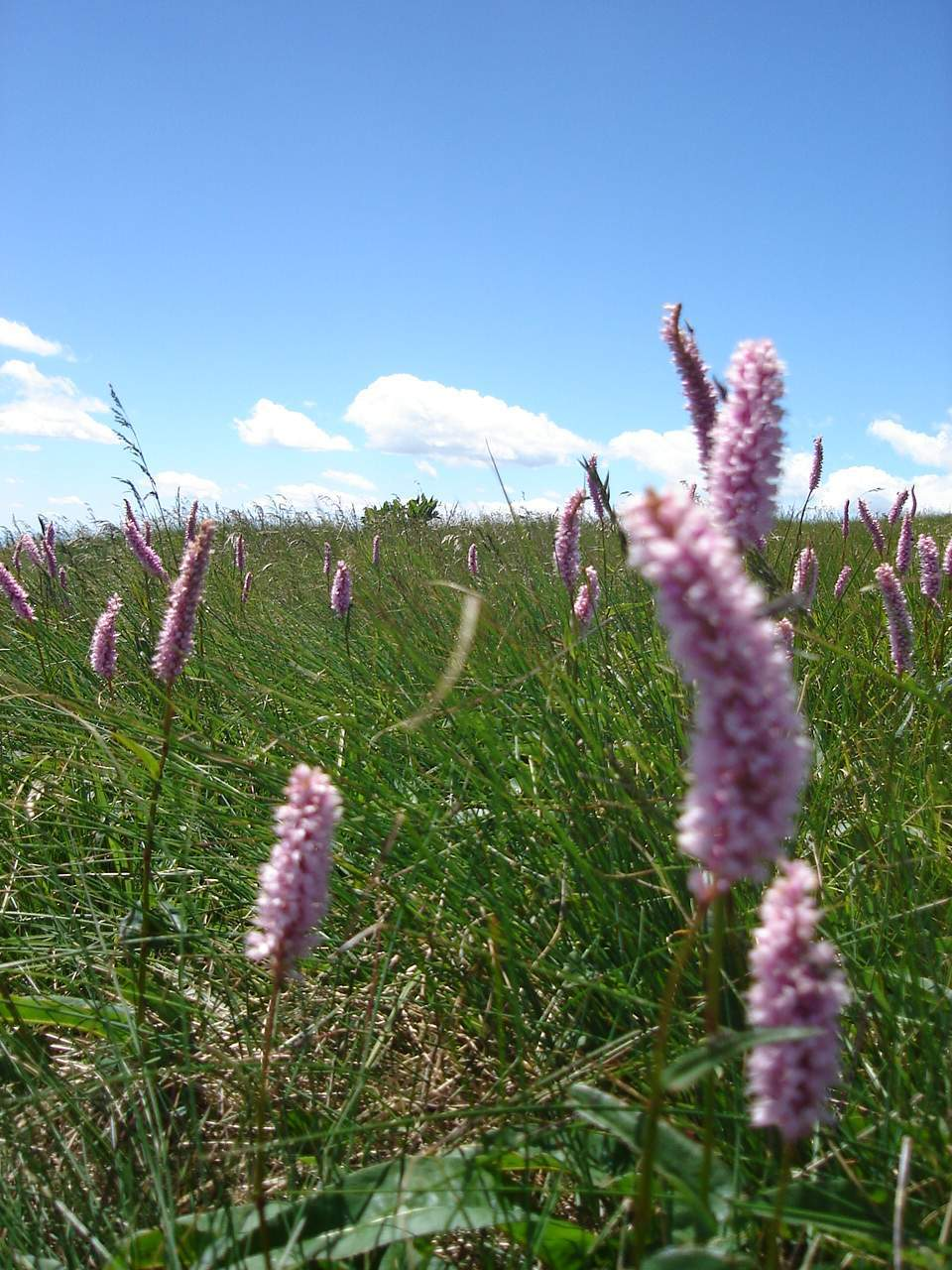
In Vitosha, Bulgaria

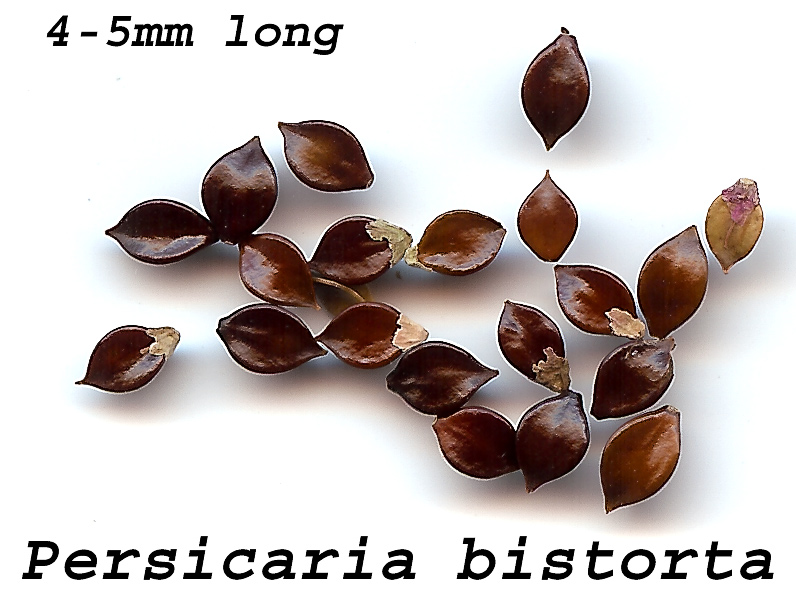
Seeds

== Bibliography ==
- Schuster, Tanja M.; Reveal, James L.; Bayly, Michael J. & Kron, Kathleen A. (2015). "An updated molecular phylogeny of Polygonoideae (Polygonaceae): Relationships of Oxygonum, Pteroxygonum, and Rumex, and a new circumscription of Koenigia". Taxon. 64 (6): 1188–1208. Bibcode:2015Taxon..64.1188S. doi:10.12705/646.5.
