= Polygonum microspermum =

Polygonum microspermum has been published three times and is a botanical synonym of two species of plant:

- Polygonum arenastrum, synonym published in 1857 by Alexandre Boreau
- Polygonum engelmannii, synonym published in 1894 by Edmund Perry Sheldon
- Polygonum engelmannii, synonym published in 1892 by John Kunkel Small
