= Slender knotweed =

Slender knotweed can refer to multiple plants:

- Persicaria decipiens, native to Asia and Australia
- Polygonum tenue, native to North America
