= Polygonum polyneuron =

Scientific classification
- Kingdom: Plantae
- Clade: Tracheophytes
- Clade: Angiosperms
- Clade: Eudicots
- Order: Caryophyllales
- Family: Polygonaceae
- Genus: Polygonum
- Species: P. polyneuron

Binomial name
- Polygonum polyneuron Franch. & Sav.

Species of flowering plant

Polygonum polyneuron is a species of flowering plant in the family Polygonaceae, native to Japan, Korea, the Kuril Islands, and Primorye. It was first described by Adrien René Franchet & Ludovic Savatier.

It has also been treated as a synonym of Polygonum aviculare subsp. depressum (Meisn.) Arcang.
