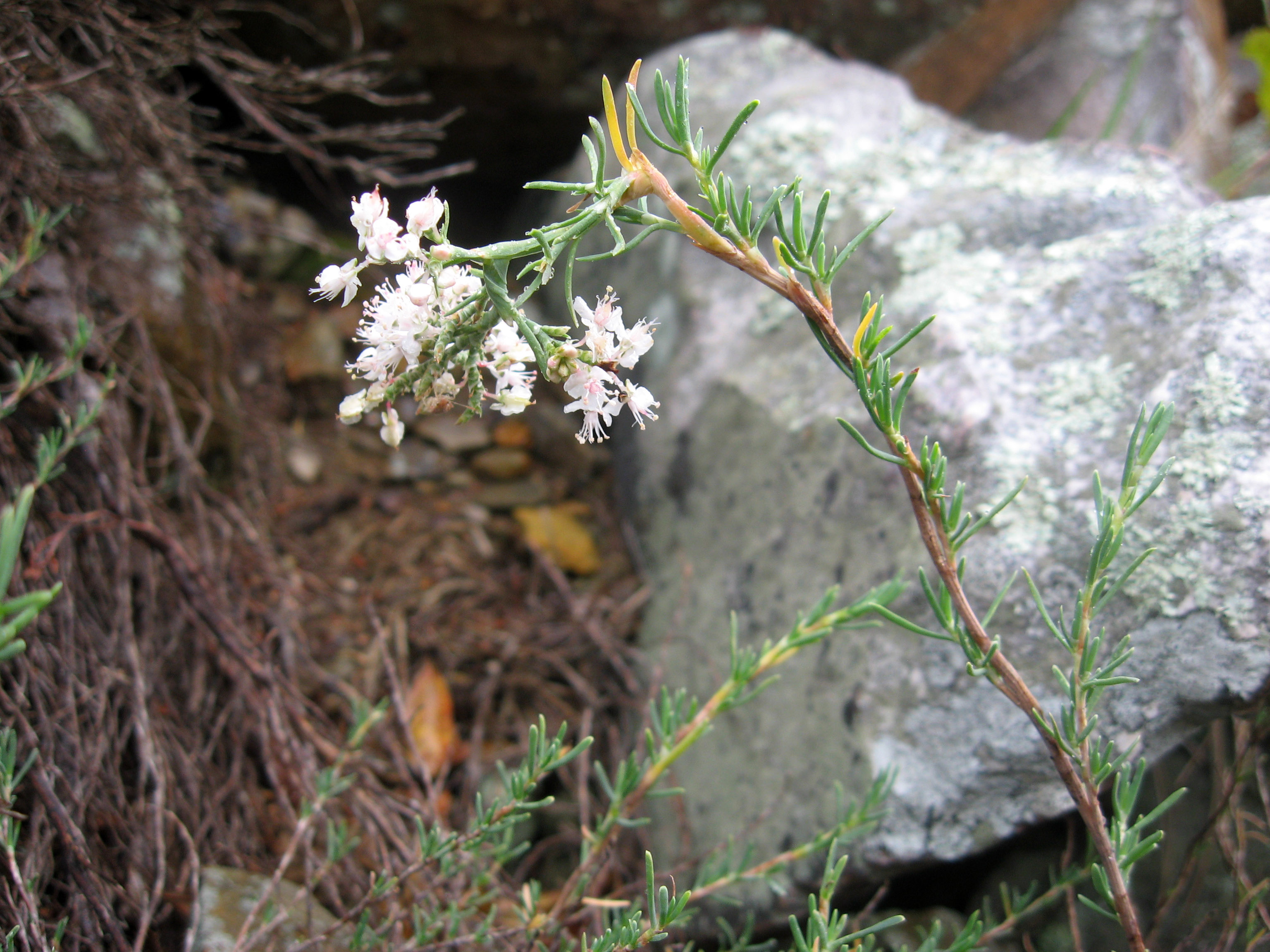

Scientific classification
- Kingdom: Plantae
- Clade: Tracheophytes
- Clade: Angiosperms
- Clade: Eudicots
- Order: Caryophyllales
- Family: Polygonaceae
- Genus: Polygonum
- Species: P. americanum

Binomial name
- Polygonum americanum (Fisch. & C.A.Mey.) T.M.Schust. & Reveal

Synonyms
- Gonopyrum americanum Fisch. & C.A.Mey.; Pleurostena serotina (Raf.) Raf.; Polygonella americana (Fisch. & C.A.Mey.) Small; Polygonella ericoides Engelm. & A.Gray; Polygonella meissneriana Shuttlew. ex Meisn.; Psammogonum americanum (Fisch. & C.A.Mey.) Nieuwl.

= Polygonum americanum =

Species of flowering plant

Polygonum americanum, commonly called southern jointweed or American jointweed, is a species of flowering plant in the knotweed family. It is native to Southeastern United States extending in scattered locations west to New Mexico. Its preferred habitat is dry, sandy areas.

Polygonum americanum was first described in 1845. It was at one time placed in the genus Polygonella (under the name Polygonella americana), but in 2015, following a series of molecular phylogenetic studies, this genus was subsumed into Polygonum.

Line drawing
