= Polygonum tenerum =

Conservation status
- Apparently Secure (NatureServe)

Scientific classification
- Kingdom: Plantae
- Clade: Tracheophytes
- Clade: Angiosperms
- Clade: Eudicots
- Order: Caryophyllales
- Family: Polygonaceae
- Genus: Polygonum
- Species: P. tenerum

Binomial name
- Polygonum tenerum Spreng.

Species of plant

Polygonum tenerum, common name tall jointweed, slender jointweed, or wireweed, is a species of flowering plant. It grows in the southeastern United States including parts of Florida, Georgia, Mississippi, North Carolina, South Carolina, and southern Alabama. It is an annual in the Polygonaceae family. It grows in sandhill and dry pineland habitats. It has small wiry stems and can grow to five feet tall. The white and pink flowers. It is dioecious. It produces reddish-brown achenes

Polygonella gracilis is a synonym.
