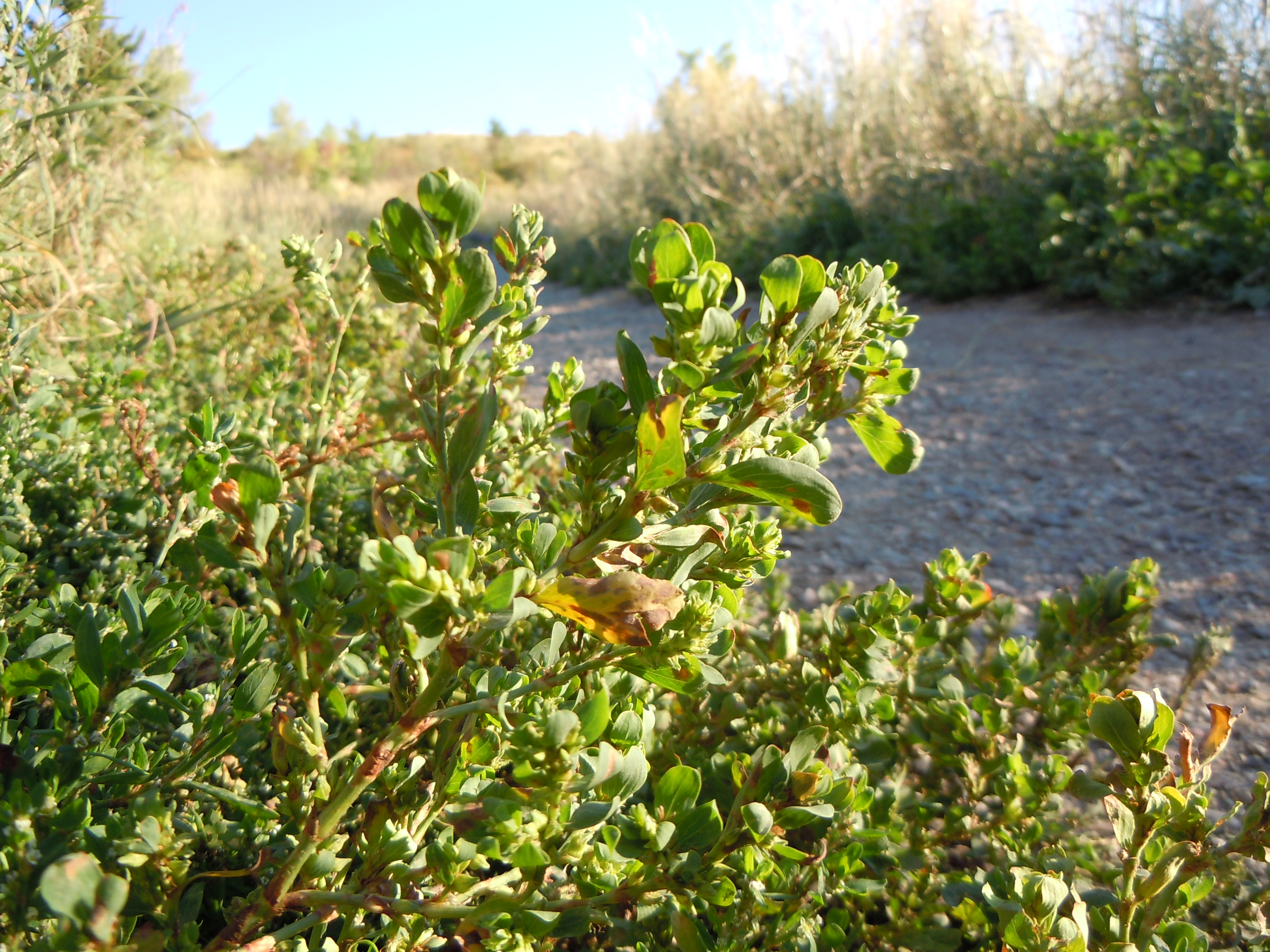

Conservation status
- Secure (NatureServe)

Scientific classification
- Kingdom: Plantae
- Clade: Tracheophytes
- Clade: Angiosperms
- Clade: Eudicots
- Order: Caryophyllales
- Family: Polygonaceae
- Genus: Polygonum
- Species: P. achoreum

Binomial name
- Polygonum achoreum S.F.Blake

Synonyms
- Polygonum erectum subsp. achoreum (S.F.Blake) Á.Löve & D.Löve

= Polygonum achoreum =

Plant species in the buckwheat family

Polygonum achoreum, common names Blake's knotweed, leathery knotweed or striate knotweed, is a North American species of plants in the buckwheat family. It is widespread across much of Canada and the northern United States.

Polygonum achoreum is an herb up to 70 cm (28 in) tall with yellow-green flowers in flat-topped clusters.

== Taxonomy ==
Polygonum achoreum was scientifically described and named in 1917 by Sidney Fay Blake. The species is part of the Polygonum genus within the Polygonaceae family. It has no subspecies, but was described as a subspecies of Polygonum erectum in 1982 by Áskell Löve and Doris Löve.
