= Polygonum smallianum =

Conservation status
- Vulnerable (NatureServe)

Scientific classification
- Kingdom: Plantae
- Clade: Tracheophytes
- Clade: Angiosperms
- Clade: Eudicots
- Order: Caryophyllales
- Family: Polygonaceae
- Genus: Polygonum
- Species: P. smallianum

Binomial name
- Polygonum smallianum T.M.Schust. & Reveal

Synonyms
- Polygonella macrophylla Small

Species of flowering plant

Polygonum smallianum (synonym Polygonella macrophylla) is a species of flowering plant in the knotweed family known by the common name largeleaf jointweed. It is native to a small area around the border between Alabama and Florida in the United States.

== Description ==
This plant is a perennial herb or subshrub with stiff, erect stems coming from a woody base and taproot. It may exceed one meter in height. The leathery leaves are alternately arranged. The largest near the stem bases are up to 6.8 centimeters long. They are mostly oval with smooth edges and rounded tips. The inflorescence is made up of a number of racemes of flowers. There is a white- or pinkish-flowered form and a red-flowered form.

== Taxonomy ==
The species was first described in 1856 by John Kunkel Small as Polygonella macrophylla. In 2015, following a series of molecular phylogenetic studies, the genus Polygonella was subsumed into Polygonum. However, the name "Polygonum macrophylla" was unavailable, so the replacement name Polygonum smallianum was published in 2011.

== Distribution, habitat and conservation ==
This species occurs in the Florida scrub of the Florida Panhandle and a part of southern Alabama. It grows in open scrub and coastal dunes. Rare in general, it can be common in its range.

The main threat to the species is the loss of its scrub habitat to development and silviculture.
