= Polygonum hickmanii =

Conservation status
- Critically Imperiled (NatureServe)

Scientific classification
- Kingdom: Plantae
- Clade: Embryophytes
- Clade: Tracheophytes
- Clade: Spermatophytes
- Clade: Angiosperms
- Clade: Eudicots
- Order: Caryophyllales
- Family: Polygonaceae
- Genus: Polygonum
- Species: P. hickmanii

Binomial name
- Polygonum hickmanii H.R.Hinds & R.Morgan

Species of flowering plant

Polygonum hickmanii is a rare species of flowering plant in the buckwheat family known by the common names Scotts Valley polygonum and Hickman's knotweed. It is endemic to Santa Cruz County, California, where it is known from only two sites in the Scotts Valley. It grows on coastal prairie on mudstone and sandstone substrates, in an area known for its spring wildflowers. The small plant was first noted in 1990 and described as a new species in 1995. The plant is a federally listed endangered species.

Polygonum hickmanii is a small annual plant forming compact patches on the ground, its stem growing no more than about 5 centimeters (2 inches) tall. It is lined with linear leaves especially near the tips of the branches, and has a cylindrical, shreddy ochrea. Solitary flowers occur in the leaf axils. They are only 2 or 3 millimeters long and white or pink-tinged in color. The eight tiny stamens are tipped with orange-pink anthers.

Threats to Polygonum hickmanii include proposed development in its small, patchy habitat and the invasion of non-native plants.
