= Polygonum rupestre =

Scientific classification
- Kingdom: Plantae
- Clade: Embryophytes
- Clade: Tracheophytes
- Clade: Angiosperms
- Clade: Eudicots
- Order: Caryophyllales
- Family: Polygonaceae
- Genus: Polygonum
- Species: P. rupestre

Binomial name
- Polygonum rupestre Kar. & Kir.

Species of flowering plant

Polygonum rupestre Kar. & Kir. is a species of flowering plant in the family Polygonaceae, native to Kazakhstan, Kyrgyzstan, Tajikistan and Uzbekistan. It was first described by Grigorij Silych Karelin and Ivan Kirilov in 1841.

(Polygonum rupestre (Wedd.) Kuntze is a different species, and is a synonym of Muehlenbeckia volcanica.)
