= Polygonum utahense =

Scientific classification
- Kingdom: Plantae
- Clade: Tracheophytes
- Clade: Angiosperms
- Clade: Eudicots
- Order: Caryophyllales
- Family: Polygonaceae
- Genus: Polygonum
- Species: P. utahense

Binomial name
- Polygonum utahense Brenckle & Cottam 1940

Synonyms
- Polygonum utahensis; Polygonum douglasii var. utahense (Brenckle & Cottam) S.L.Welsh

Species of flowering plant

Polygonum utahense, the Utah knotweed, is an unresolved name for a putative North American species of plants in the buckwheat family. It has been found only in the States of Utah and Arizona in the southwestern United States.

Polygonum utahense is a herb up to 50 cm (20 in) tall. Stems are green or brown, not wiry. Leaves are narrow, up to 4 cm (1.6 in) long. Flowers are pink or white.
