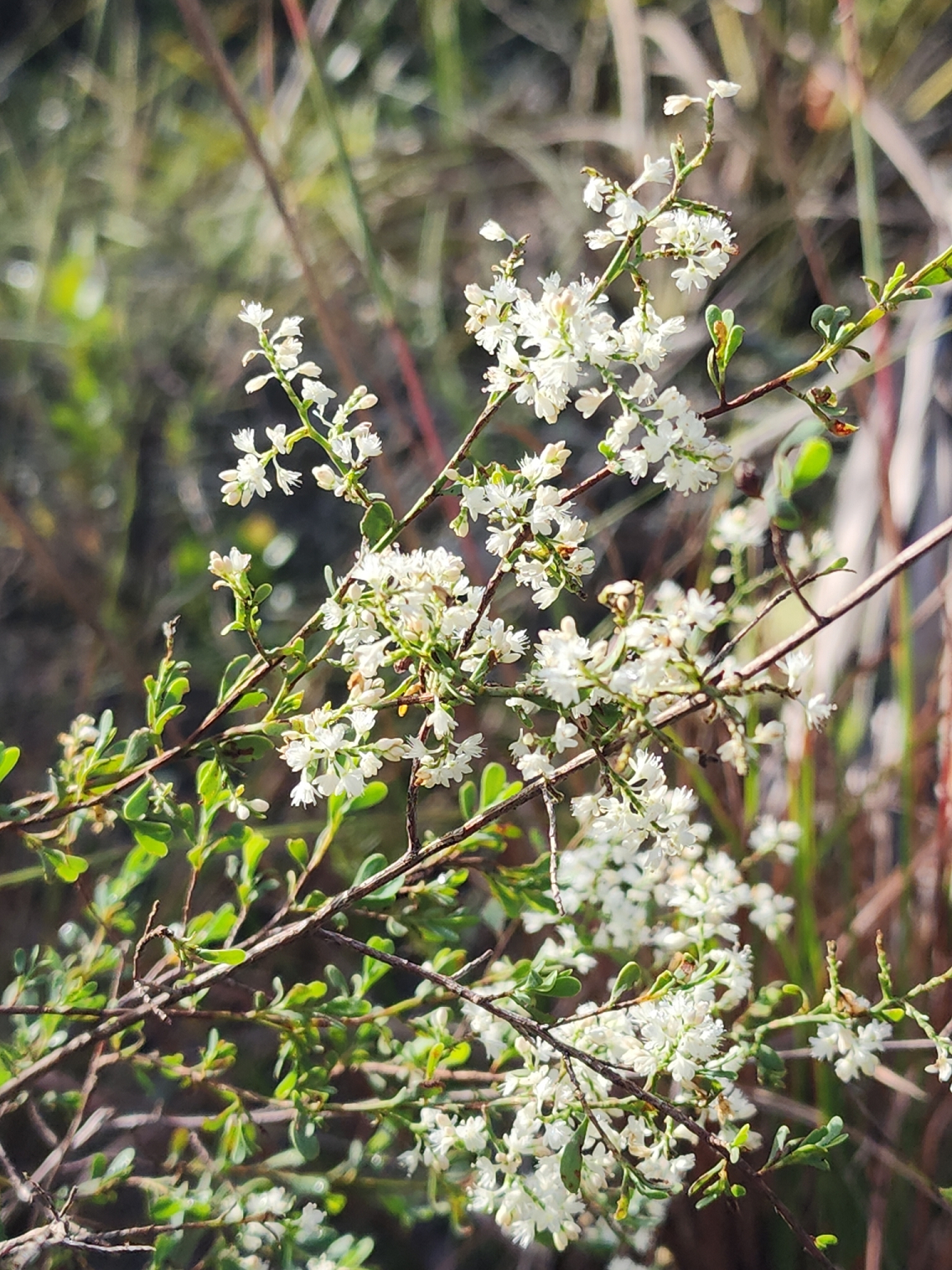
- Blooming in open-canopy Florida scrub habitat

Conservation status
- Secure (NatureServe)

Scientific classification
- Kingdom: Plantae
- Clade: Tracheophytes
- Clade: Angiosperms
- Clade: Eudicots
- Order: Caryophyllales
- Family: Polygonaceae
- Genus: Polygonum
- Species: P. polygamum

Binomial name
- Polygonum polygamum Vent.

Synonyms
- Polygonella polygama (Vent.) Engelm. & A.Gray

= Polygonum polygamum =

Species of flowering plant

Polygonum polygamum, commonly referred to as october-flower, is a species of flowering plant endemic to the US southeast coastal plain.

== Habitat ==
It grows in the xeric fire-dependent habitats of the region, including longleaf pine sandhill and Florida scrub.

== Conservation ==
The species is relatively widespread and can be locally abundant where suitable habitat persists. It, like other dry site endemics of the region, may face long-term threats due to habitat loss for real estate, agriculture, and pine silviculture.

As an obligate heliophile, the species cannot persist in areas with closed canopy and low sunlight exposure, so additional threats include fire suppression and invasive species.
