= Polygonum marinense =

Conservation status
- Imperiled (NatureServe)

Scientific classification
- Kingdom: Plantae
- Clade: Tracheophytes
- Clade: Angiosperms
- Clade: Eudicots
- Order: Caryophyllales
- Family: Polygonaceae
- Genus: Polygonum
- Species: P. marinense

Binomial name
- Polygonum marinense T.R.Mert. & P.H.Raven 1965

Species of flowering plant

Polygonum marinense is a rare North American species of flowering plants in the buckwheat family known by the common name Marin knotweed. It is endemic to California, where it is known from just a few locations north and east of San Francisco Bay.

The taxonomy of the plant is uncertain. It has been suggested that the species may be native to the Mediterranean, and that the California specimens may actually be introduced. If, however, it is a true Bay Area endemic, the plant is rare and threatened by habitat destruction and disturbance. It is a resident of salt marsh and other wet coastal habitat.

Polygonum marinense is an annual herb producing a ribbed, reddish stem growing prostrate or erect to a maximum height near 40 centimeters (16 inches). The narrow oval or lance-shaped leaves are alternately arranged along the slender stem. Each reddish leaf has a funnel-shaped stipule that wraps around the leaf base to form an ochrea. Flowers occur in the leaf axils. They are greenish with white or pink-tinged edges.
