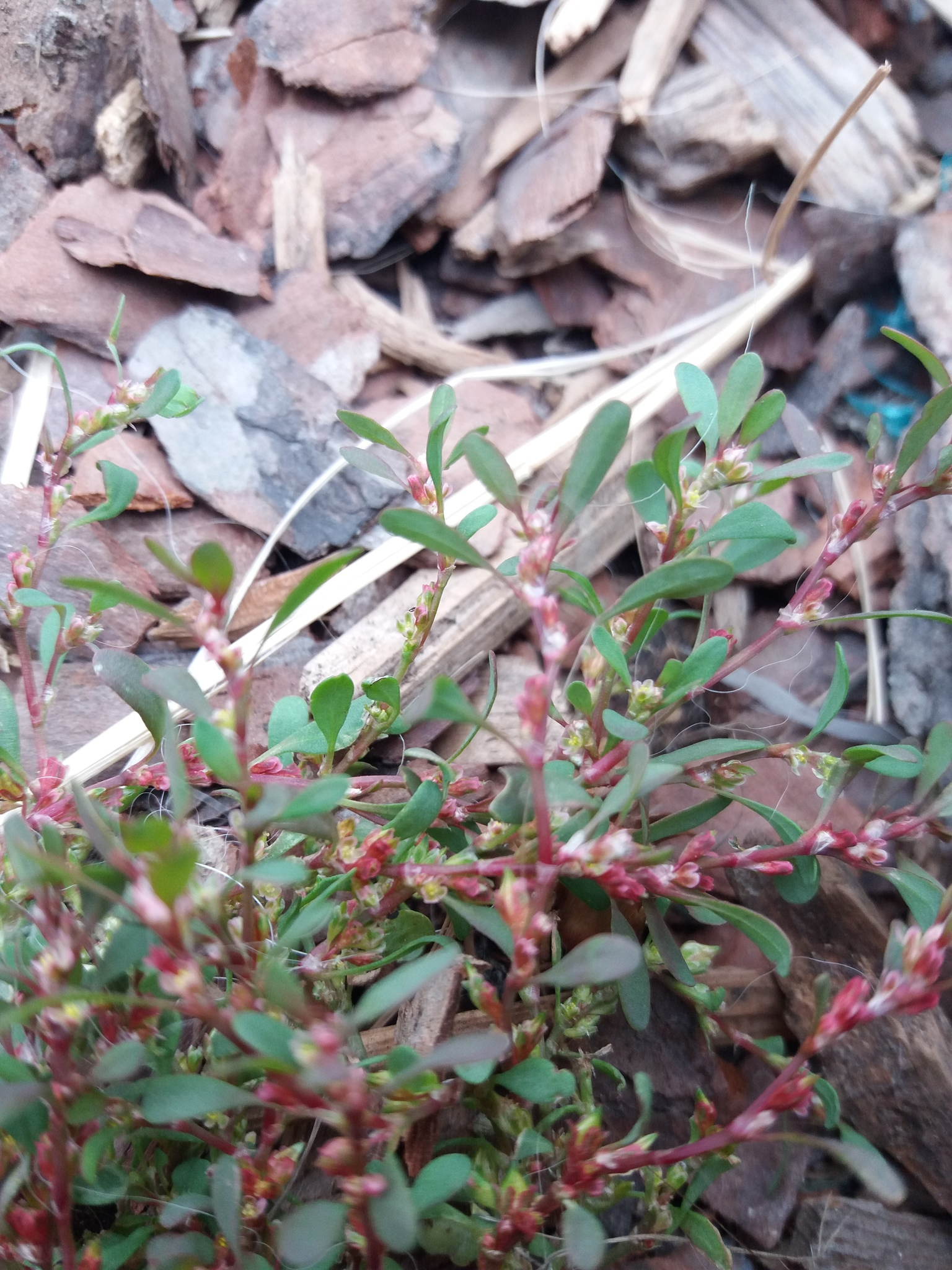

Scientific classification
- Kingdom: Plantae
- Clade: Embryophytes
- Clade: Tracheophytes
- Clade: Angiosperms
- Clade: Eudicots
- Order: Caryophyllales
- Family: Polygonaceae
- Genus: Polygonum
- Species: P. humifusum

Binomial name
- Polygonum humifusum C.Merck ex K.Koch

Subspecies
- Polygonum humifusum subsp. caurianum (B.L.Rob.) Costea & Tardif; Polygonum humifusum subsp. humifusum

Synonyms
- Polygonum humifusum f. yamatutae (Kitag.) C.F. Fang; Polygonum mandshuricum Skvortsov; Polygonum yamatutae Kitag.; Polygonum caurianum B.L. Rob.

= Polygonum humifusum =

Species of flowering plant

Polygonum humifusum is a species of Asian and North American flowering plant in the buckwheat family, Polygonaceae.

It grows in arctic and subarctic regions of eastern Russia, Mongolia, northeastern China, Alaska, and Canada (Yukon, Northwest Territory, Nunavut, British Columbia, northern Ontario).

Polygonum humifusum is a branching herb with erect or reclining stems up to 30 cm (1 foot) tall. Flowers are green, pink, or white, produced in groups of 2–5. It grows in fields and on riverbanks at elevations less than 400 m (1300 feet).
