= Polygonum austiniae =

Scientific classification
- Kingdom: Plantae
- Clade: Tracheophytes
- Clade: Angiosperms
- Clade: Eudicots
- Order: Caryophyllales
- Family: Polygonaceae
- Genus: Polygonum
- Species: P. austiniae

Binomial name
- Polygonum austiniae Greene 1885

Synonyms
- Polygonum austinae Greene; Polygonum douglasii subsp. austiniae (Greene) A.E. Murray; Polygonum douglasii subsp. austiniae (Greene) J.C. Hickman; Polygonum douglasii var. austiniae (Greene) M.E. Jones

Species of flowering plant

Polygonum austiniae, common name Mrs. Austin's knotweed, is a plant species in the buckwheat family. It is native to western Canada and the western United States, from Alberta and British Columbia south as far as California, Nevada, and Wyoming.

Polygonum austiniae is an branching herb up to 20 cm (7.9 in) tall. Its habitats include sagebrush plains and ponderosa-pine forest.
