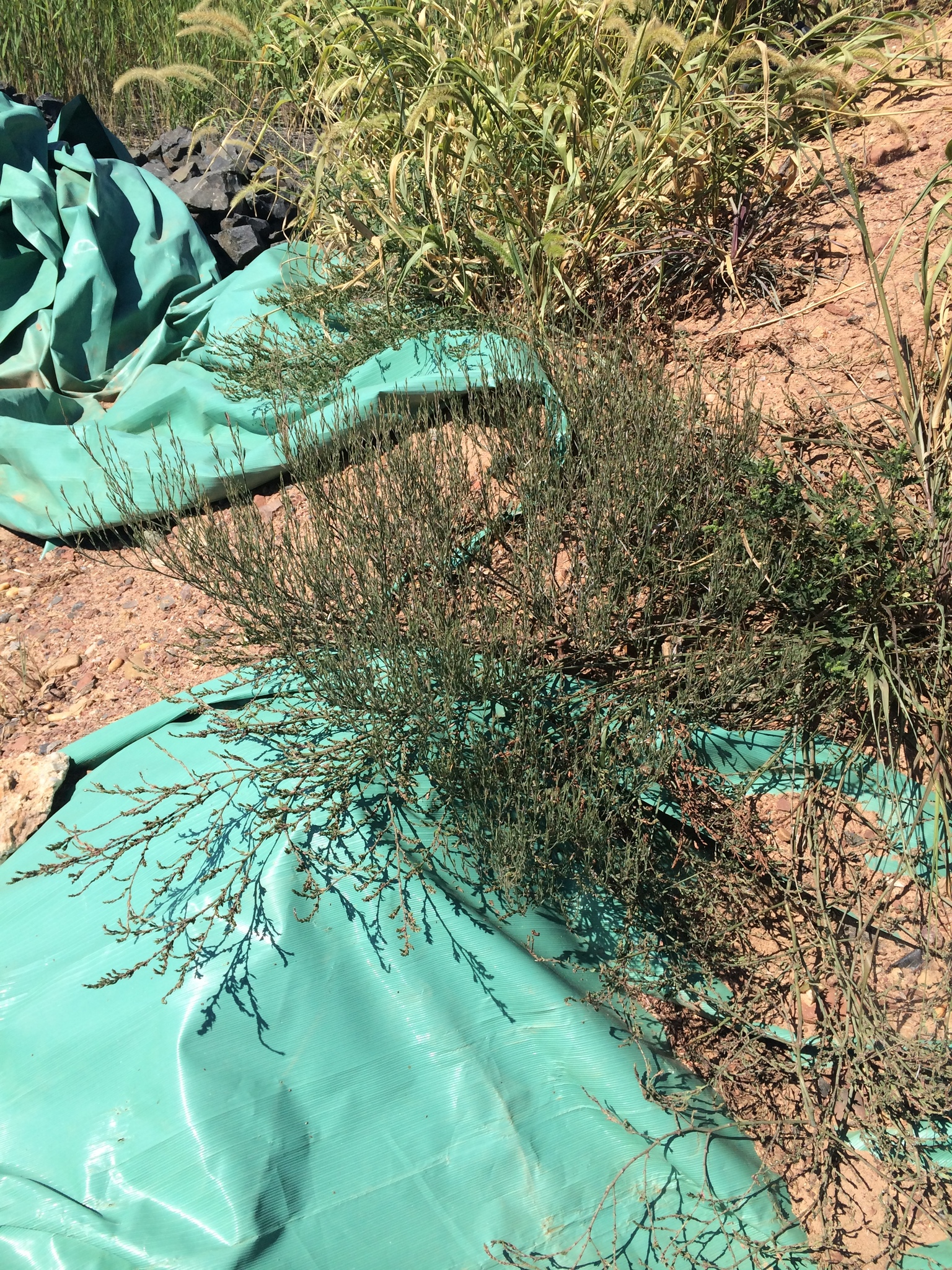

Scientific classification
- Kingdom: Plantae
- Clade: Tracheophytes
- Clade: Angiosperms
- Clade: Eudicots
- Order: Caryophyllales
- Family: Polygonaceae
- Genus: Polygonum
- Species: P. ramosissimum

Binomial name
- Polygonum ramosissimum Michx. 1803

Synonyms
- Synonymy: Cnopos ramosissimum (Michx.) Raf.; Polygonum atlanticum (B.L. Rob.) E.P. Bicknell; Polygonum exsertum Small; Polygonum interior Brenckle; Polygonum latum Small ex Rydb.; Polygonum leptocarpum B.L. Rob.; Polygonum stevensii Brenckle; Polygonum triangulum E.P. Bicknell ex Small; Polygonum autumnale Brenckle; Polygonum prolificum (Small) B.L. Rob.

= Polygonum ramosissimum =

Species of flowering plant

Polygonum ramosissimum is a North American species of herbaceous annual plants in the buckwheat family, widespread across much of Canada and the United States, where it is commonly called bushy knotweed. It is susceptible to downy mildew caused by the oomycete species Peronospora americana.

== Description ==
Polygonum ramosissimum has erect stems growing 30 to 100 cm (12 to 39.5 in) (sometimes to 200 cm or 80 inches) tall, with yellowish-green to blue-green foliage. The stems are freely branched with closed flowers produced in groups of (1) 2 to 3(5) flowers in the upper ocreae of racemes that are up to 15 cm (6 in) long, the inflorescences are spike-like. The greenish-yellow, rarely pink or white marked flowers, are on pedicels that are longer than the calyx. The calyx is around 3 mm (0.12 in) long and 5-parted with the outer three sepals longer than the inner sepals. The seeds are produced in fruits called achenes, which are egg-shaped, dark brown and around 3 mm (0.12 in) long. The achenes also have a smooth shiny surface. The late season achenes are larger, from 4 to 15 mm long.

Subspecies

There are a number of forms and two subspecies, that vary in flower and foliage coloration. Polygonum ramosissimum has great morphological variability, which is notable on the same plant, between flowers and fruits produced early in the blooming season verses those produced late in the season, plants also show great variation over geographical areas. The following names are widely recognized.

- Polygonum ramosissimum subsp. prolificum (Small) Costea & Tardif
- Polygonum ramosissimum subsp. ramosissimum

In Maryland, the species is listed as endangered or extirpated from the state, in Pennsylvania it has been exterminated from the state, and New Hampshire lists it as threatened.
