= Polygonum striatulum =

Scientific classification
- Kingdom: Plantae
- Clade: Tracheophytes
- Clade: Angiosperms
- Clade: Eudicots
- Order: Caryophyllales
- Family: Polygonaceae
- Genus: Polygonum
- Species: P. striatulum

Binomial name
- Polygonum striatulum B.L.Rob. 1904

Synonyms
- Polygonum striatulum var. texense (M.C. Johnst.) Costea & Tardif; Polygonum texense M.C. Johnst.

Species of flowering plant

Polygonum striatulum, the striped knotweed or Texas knotweed, is endemic to the U.S. state of Texas but cultivated as an ornamental elsewhere. It occurs there in sterile prairies, granitic soils, and in places that are seasonally moist, at elevations of 100–700 m (330–2,300 ft).

Polygonum striatulum is a perennial herb that spreads by means of underground rhizomes. Leaves are lanceolate, up to 35 mm (1.4 in) long, the leaves in the upper part of the plant decidedly larger than those closer to the ground. Inflorescences are at the top of the plant and also at the tips of branches, each with 2–6 white to pinkish flowers.
