= Polygonum rurivagum =

Scientific classification
- Kingdom: Plantae
- Clade: Tracheophytes
- Clade: Angiosperms
- Clade: Eudicots
- Order: Caryophyllales
- Family: Polygonaceae
- Genus: Polygonum
- Species: P. rurivagum

Binomial name
- Polygonum rurivagum Jord. ex Boreau

Species of flowering plant

Polygonum rurivagum is a species of flowering plant belonging to the family Polygonaceae.

Its native range is Europe, Africa and Temperate Asia.
