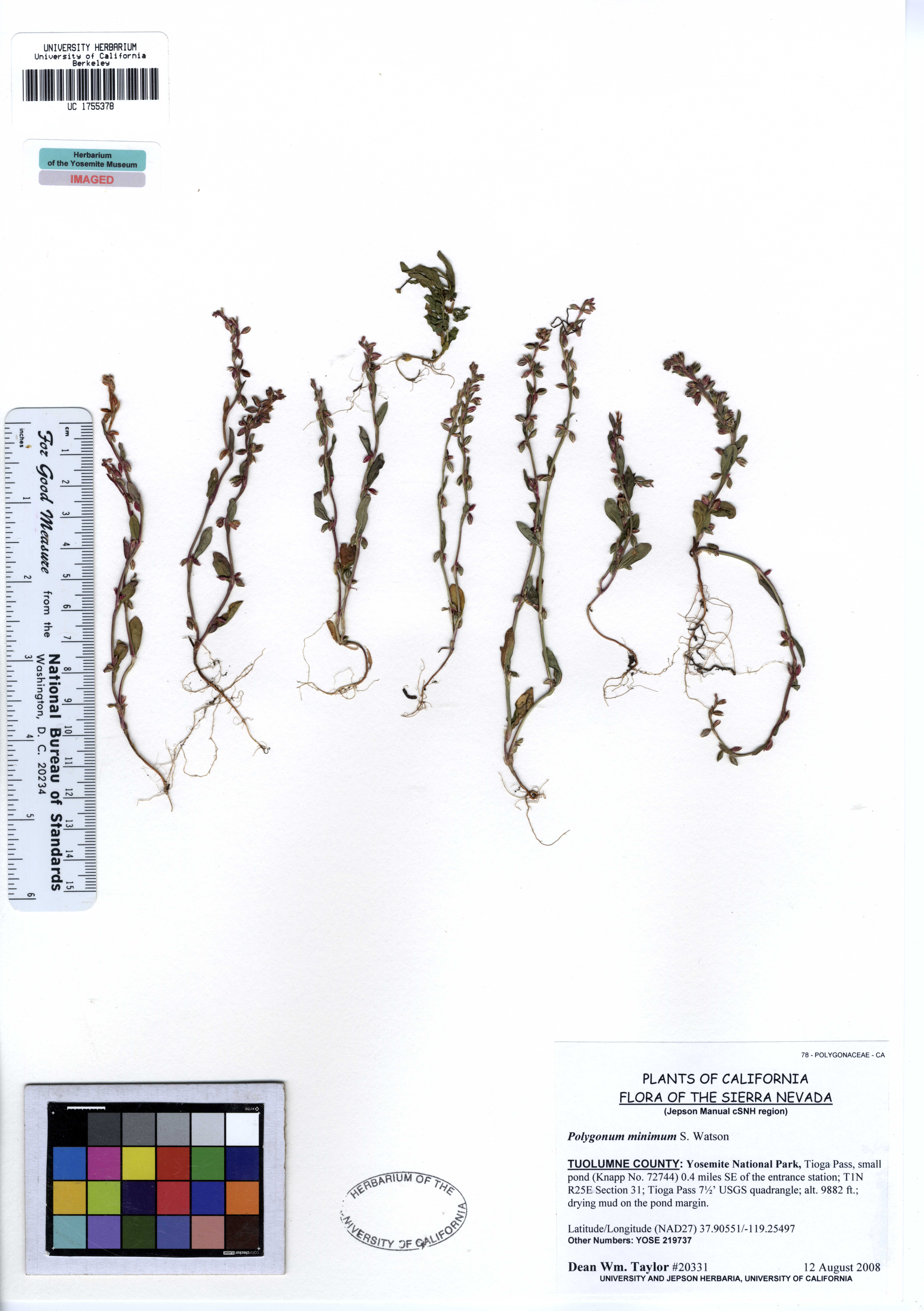

Scientific classification
- Kingdom: Plantae
- Clade: Tracheophytes
- Clade: Angiosperms
- Clade: Eudicots
- Order: Caryophyllales
- Family: Polygonaceae
- Genus: Polygonum
- Species: P. minimum

Binomial name
- Polygonum minimum S.Watson 1871

Synonyms
- Polygonum torreyi S. Watson

= Polygonum minimum =

Species of flowering plant

Polygonum minimum is a species of flowering plant in the knotweed family known by the common name broadleaf knotweed. It is native to much of western North America where it can be found in mountainous regions. It grows in the subalpine and alpine climates of high mountain ranges from Alaska to Arizona and New Mexico.

== Description ==
Polygonum minimum is an annual herb producing slender, stiff, zigzag-angled reddish stems up to 30 centimeters (1 foot) long, growing prostrate or erect. The leaves are lance-shaped to widely oval or nearly round and are located all along the stems but most crowded near the tips. Inflorescences occur in the leaf axils, each bearing one or more five-lobed white flowers.
