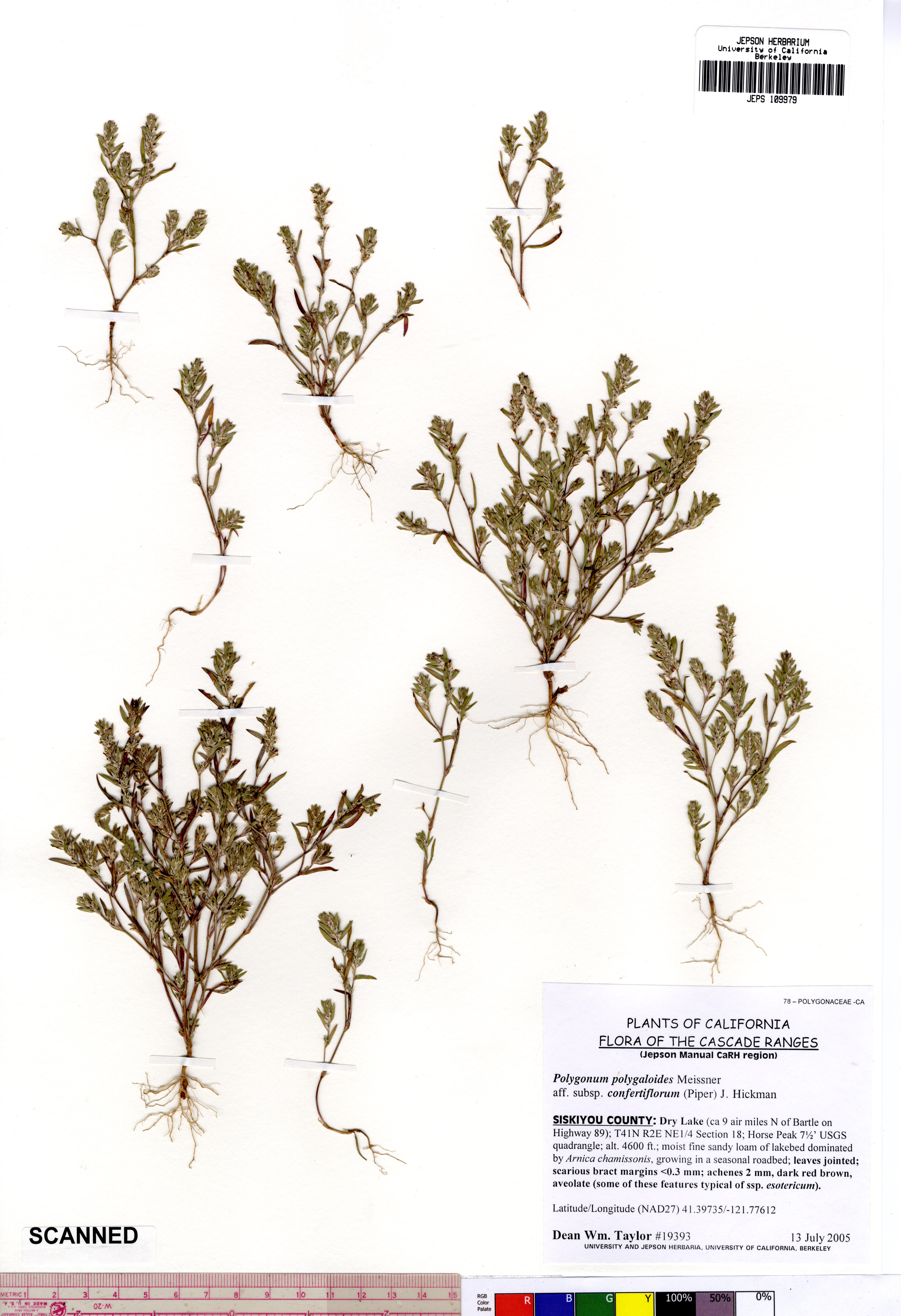
- Polygonum polygaloides var. confertum

Scientific classification
- Kingdom: Plantae
- Clade: Tracheophytes
- Clade: Angiosperms
- Clade: Eudicots
- Order: Caryophyllales
- Family: Polygonaceae
- Genus: Polygonum
- Species: P. polygaloides

Binomial name
- Polygonum polygaloides Wall. ex Meisn.

Synonyms
- Synonymy: Polygonum polygaloides var. montanum Brenckle; Polygonum confertiflorum Nutt. ex Piper; Polygonum kelloggii var. confertiflorum (Nutt. ex Piper) Dorn; Polygonum watsonii Small; Polygonum esotericum L.C. Wheeler; Polygonum kelloggii Greene; Polygonum minutissimum L.O. Williams; Polygonum unifolium Small ex Rydb.

= Polygonum polygaloides =

Species of flowering plant

Polygonum polygaloides is a North American species of flowering plants in the buckwheat family known by the common names milkwort knotweed and polygala knotweed. It is native to much of western North America, where it can be found in many types of moist habitat. It is a variable species, usually divided into a number of subspecies.

== Description ==
Polygonum polygaloides is an annual herb producing slender, wiry green stems 1 to 30 centimeters (0.4–12 inches) in length. The linear or lance-shaped leaves are alternately arranged uniformly along the stem, the ones near the tips of stem branches highly reduced. The leaves have membranous stipules which fuse to form silvery ochrea at the leaf bases. The flowers are mainly located in clusters around the stem tips. They are white, pink, or red, and most remain closed.

== Subspecies ==
Some sources accept the following as subspecies of Polygonum polygaloides, while others regard all but subsp. polygaloides as belonging to a distinct species, P. kelloggii.

- Polygonum polygaloides subsp. confertiflorum (Nutt. ex Piper) J.C.Hickman – from British Columbia east to Saskatchewan and south as far as New Mexico
- Polygonum polygaloides subsp. esotericum (L.C. Wheeler) J.C. Hickman – California, Oregon
- Polygonum polygaloides subsp. kelloggii (Greene) J.C.Hickman – from British Columbia to Arizona
- Polygonum polygaloides subsp. polygaloides – Washington, Oregon, Idaho, Alberta, Montana, Wyoming
