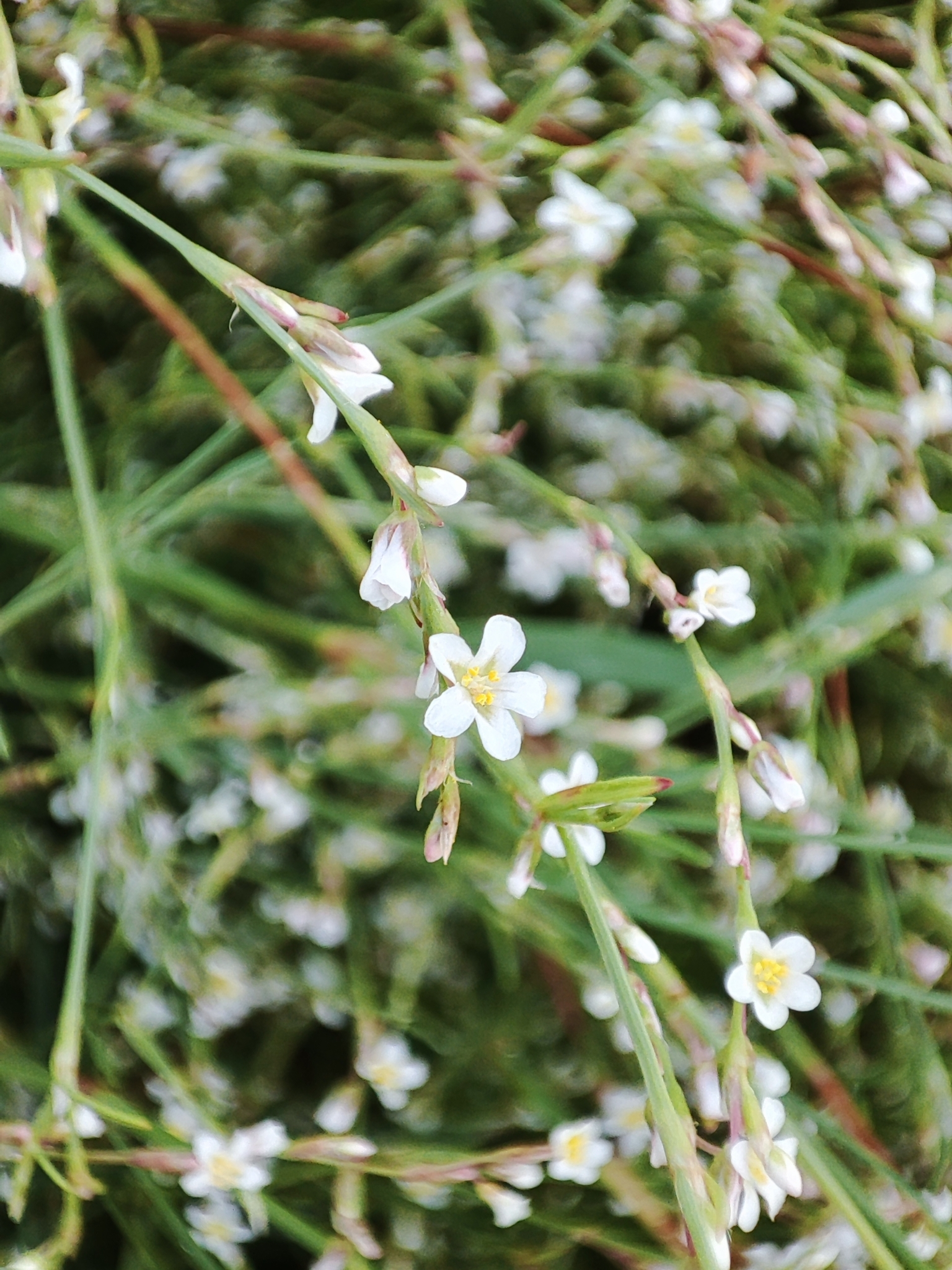
- Close-up of Polygonum arenarium subsp. pulchellum flowers
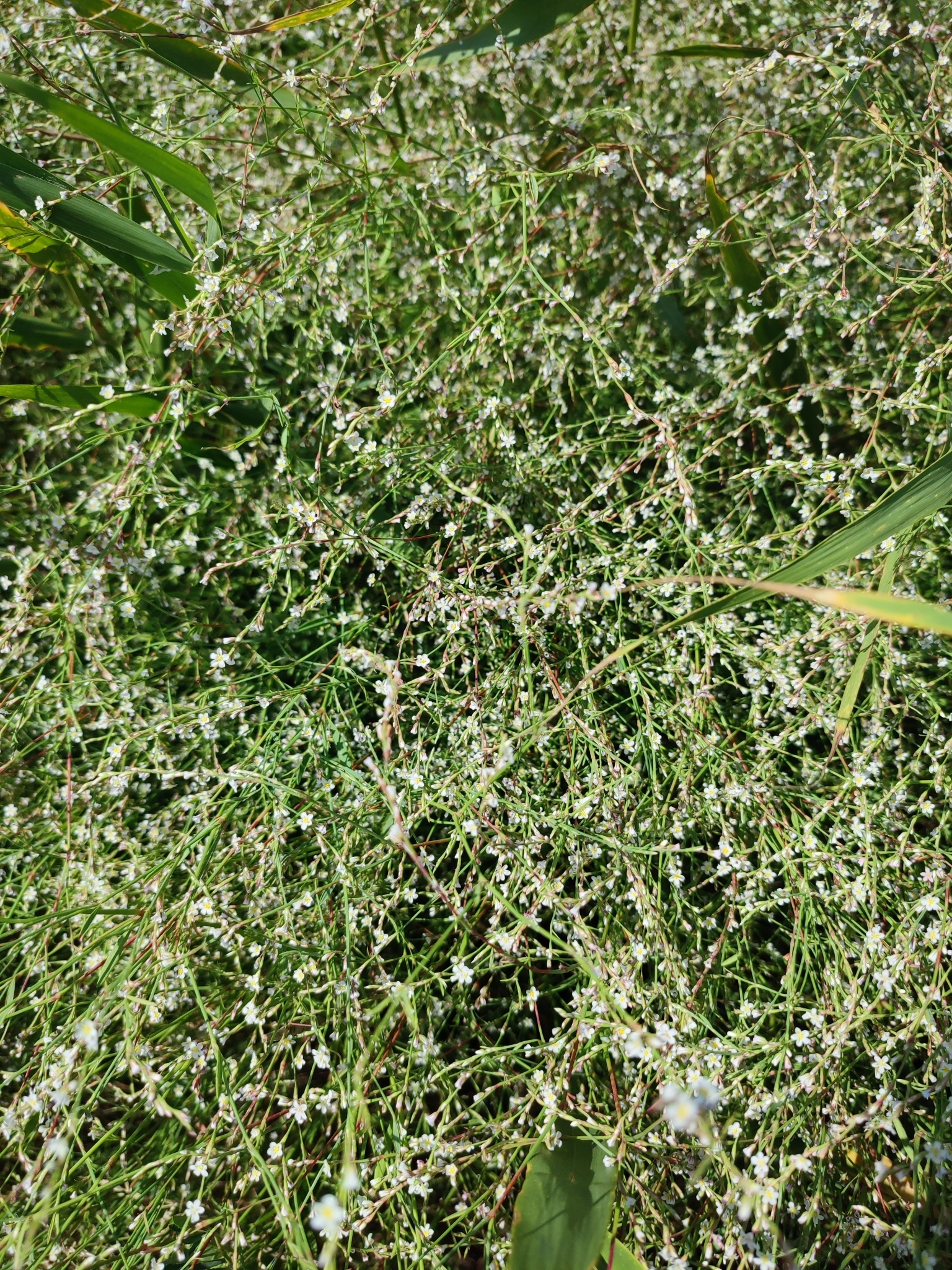
- Habit

Scientific classification
- Kingdom: Plantae
- Clade: Tracheophytes
- Clade: Angiosperms
- Clade: Eudicots
- Order: Caryophyllales
- Family: Polygonaceae
- Genus: Polygonum
- Species: P. arenarium

Binomial name
- Polygonum arenarium Waldst. & Kit.

Synonyms
- List: Centinodia arenaria (Waldst. & Kit.) Fourr.; Polygonum aphyllum (Hayne) Krock.; Polygonum arenarium subsp. janatae (Klokov) Soó; Polygonum aviculare var. aphyllum Hayne; Polygonum aviculare subsp. pulchellum (Loisel.) O.Bolòs & Vigo; Polygonum debeauxii Le Grand; Polygonum divaricatum Less.; Polygonum equisetiforme J.Mayer ex Ten.; Polygonum janatae Klokov; Polygonum junceum Ledeb.; Polygonum patulum subsp. pulchellum (Loisel.) Leblebici; Polygonum pseudoarenarium Klokov; Polygonum pulchellum Loisel.; Polygonum thevenaei Lesp.; Polygonum venantianum Clementi

= Polygonum arenarium =

Species of plant

Polygonum arenarium, the lesser red-knotgrass or European knotweed, is a species of flowering plant in the family Polygonaceae. It is native to Morocco, France, the former Czechoslovakia, Hungary, southeastern and eastern Europe, the Caucasus, Turkey, the Levant, Iraq, Iran, and Central Asia, and it has been introduced to Argentina, the British Isles, Germany, the Baltic States, and central European Russia. A scrambling or procumbent annual, it is often found in disturbed habitats. In more natural situations it is a psammophyte.

== Subtaxa ==
The following subspecies are accepted:

- Polygonum arenarium subsp. arenarium – Southeastern Europe, the former Czechoslovakia, Hungary, Ukraine, Crimea, southern and eastern European Russia, the Caucasus, Turkey, the Levant, Iraq, and Central Asia, and introduced to southern Argentina, Germany, and central European Russia.
- Polygonum arenarium subsp. pulchellum (Loisel.) Thell. – Morocco, France, Italy, Ukraine, Bulgaria, Greece, Turkey (including European Turkey), the Levant, North Caucasus, and Iran, and introduced to Ireland, Great Britain, and the Baltic States.
