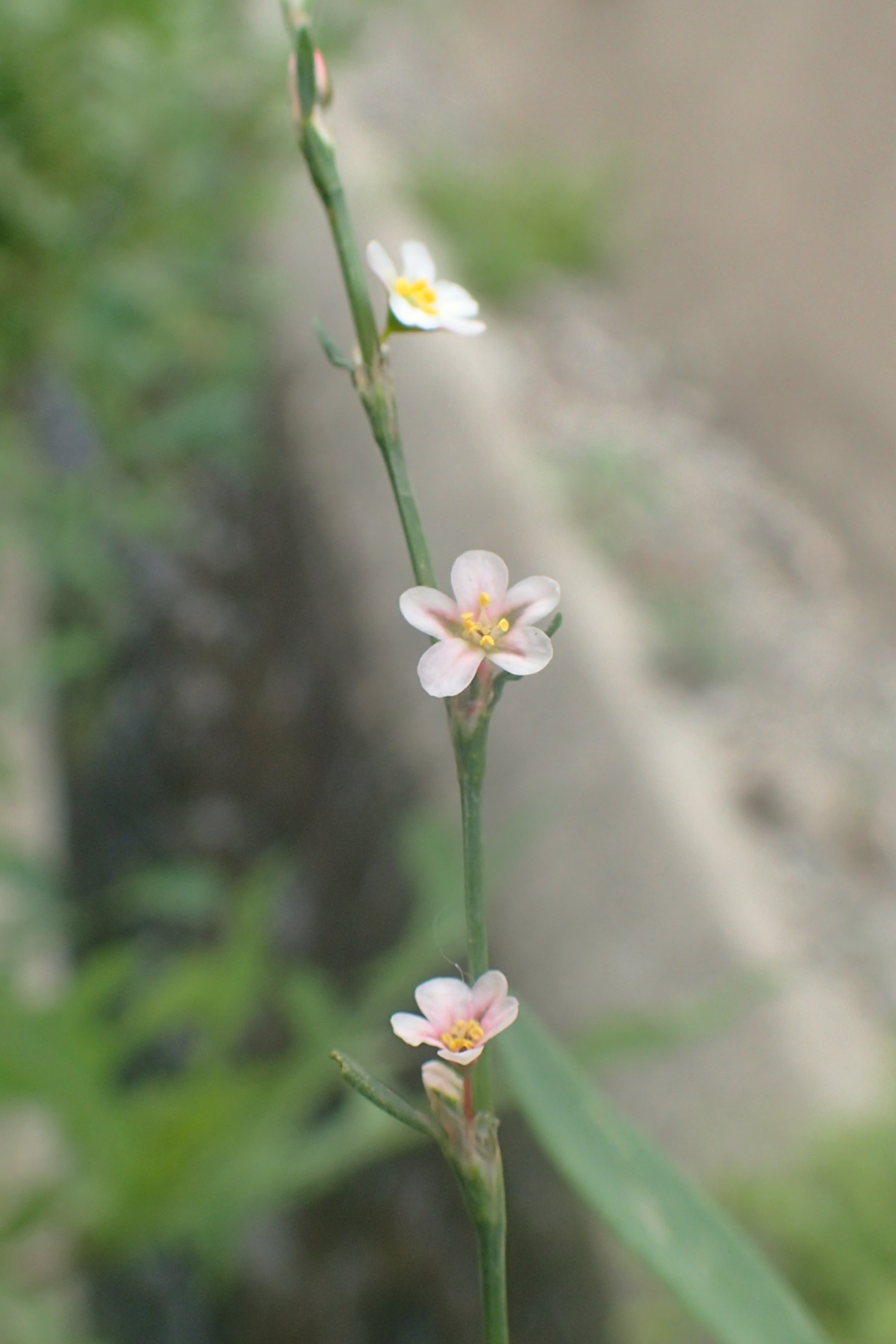
- In Armenia

Conservation status
- Least Concern (IUCN 3.1)

Scientific classification
- Kingdom: Plantae
- Clade: Tracheophytes
- Clade: Angiosperms
- Clade: Eudicots
- Order: Caryophyllales
- Family: Polygonaceae
- Genus: Polygonum
- Species: P. argyrocoleon

Binomial name
- Polygonum argyrocoleon Steud. ex Kunze 1847

Synonyms
- Polygonum deciduum Boiss. & Noe ex Meissn.

= Polygonum argyrocoleon =

Species of flowering plant

Polygonum argyrocoleon, with common names silver-sheath knotweed and Persian knotweed, is an Asian species of plants in the buckwheat family. It is native to Siberia, western China, Central Asia, and the Middle East. It has also become naturalized in parts of the United States, primarily the Southwest, and northwestern Mexico.

Polygonum argyrocoleon is an annual herb up to 80 cm (31 in) tall. It has very small leaves rarely more than 5 cm (2.0 in) long.
