= Polygonum californicum =

Scientific classification
- Kingdom: Plantae
- Clade: Tracheophytes
- Clade: Angiosperms
- Clade: Eudicots
- Order: Caryophyllales
- Family: Polygonaceae
- Genus: Polygonum
- Species: P. californicum

Binomial name
- Polygonum californicum Meisn. 1856

Synonyms
- Polygonum greenei S. Watson; Duravia californicum (Meisn.) Greene

Species of flowering plant

Polygonum californicum is a species of flowering plant in the buckwheat family known by the common name California knotweed. It is native to the west coast of the United States from Washington, Oregon, and northern and central California, in the Coast Ranges and Sierra Nevada foothills, as far south as Napa and Tulare Counties. It can be found in many types of open habitats.

== Description ==
Polygonum californicum is an annual herb producing a slender, angled stem which grows erect to a maximum height near 40 centimeters. The narrow, pointed leaves are mostly located on upper branches of the stem. The leaves have fringed, bristle-tipped stipules attached to their bases. Solitary white or pink flowers occur in upper leaf axils.
