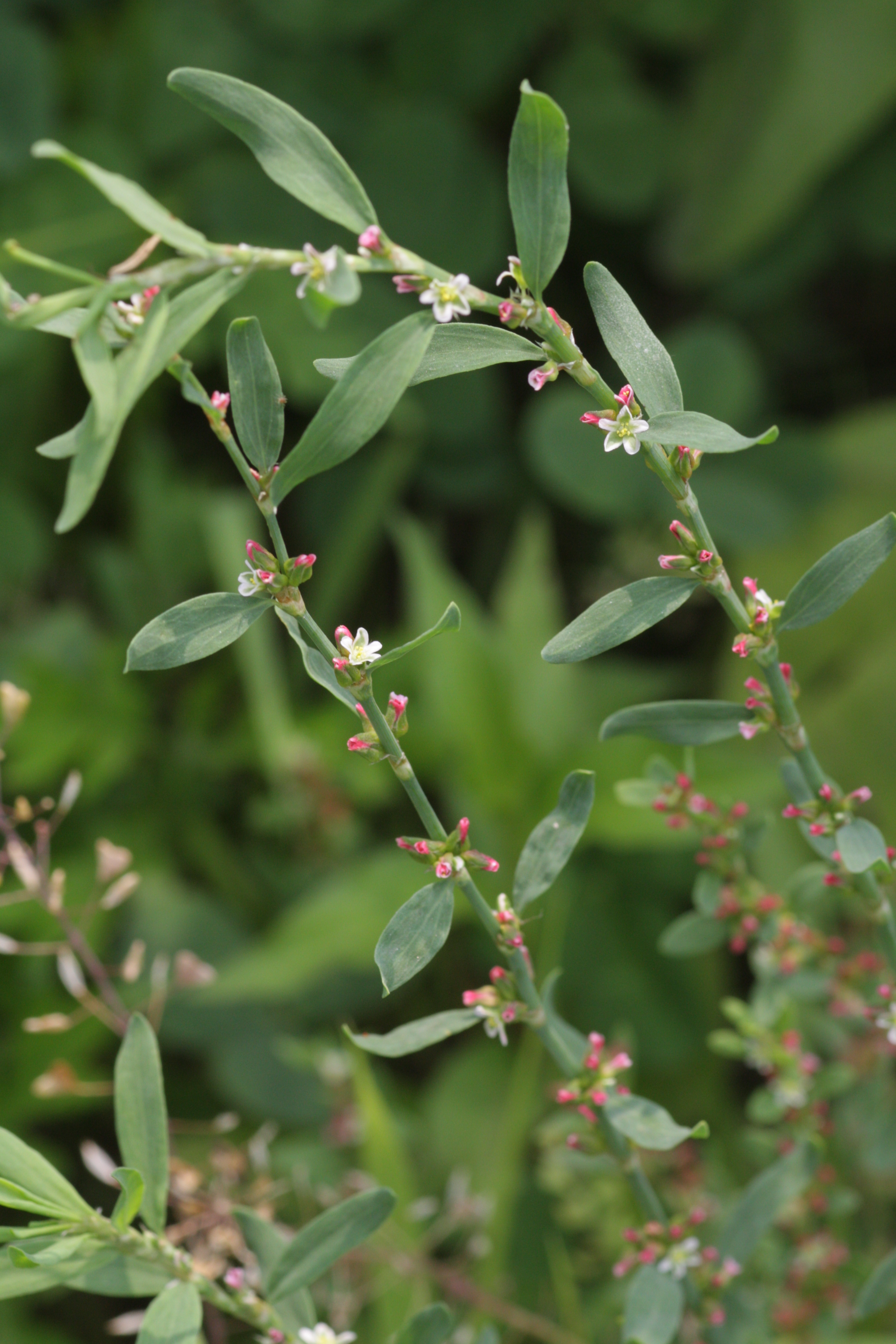
- Polygonum aviculare

Scientific classification
- Kingdom: Plantae
- Clade: Tracheophytes
- Clade: Angiosperms
- Clade: Eudicots
- Order: Caryophyllales
- Family: Polygonaceae
- Subfamily: Polygonoideae
- Genus: Polygonum; L.

Species
- See text.

= Polygonum =

Genus of flowering plants in the knotweed family

Polygonum is a genus of about 130 species of flowering plants in the buckwheat and knotweed family Polygonaceae. Common names include knotweed and knotgrass (though the common names may refer more broadly to plants from Polygonaceae). In the Middle English glossary of herbs Alphita (c. 1400–1425), it was known as ars-smerte. There have been various opinions about how broadly the genus should be defined. For example, buckwheat (Fagopyrum esculentum) has sometimes been included in the genus as Polygonum fagopyrum. Former genera such as Polygonella have been subsumed into Polygonum; other genera have been split off.

The genus primarily grows in northern temperate regions. The species are very diverse, ranging from prostrate herbaceous annual plants to erect herbaceous perennial plants.

Polygonum species are occasionally eaten by humans, and are used as food plants by the larvae of some Lepidoptera species – see list. Most species are considered weeds in Europe and North America.

== Description ==
When the genus is defined narrowly, Polygonum species are annual or perennial herbaceous plants, rarely shrubby, with much branched stems. The leaves are arranged alternately, usually less than 2 cm (0.8 in) long, with a length greater than the width. They have a membranous ochrea (a sheath around the stem nodes). The flowers are usually bisexual, rarely unisexual, and have five (occasionally four) tepals, the outer being slightly different from the inner ones. There are usually four to six stamens and three (rarely two) styles. The fruit is three-sided.

== Taxonomy ==
The genus Polygonum was first described by Carl Linnaeus in 1754. The genus name is usually said to be from the Greek πολυ- (poly-, 'many') and γόνυ (gonu, 'knee' or 'joint'), in reference to the swollen jointed stem. However, long before Linnaeus, the name was used in Greek and Latin for a plant used medically. Discussing the plant he knew as polygonum in 1655, Matthias Martinius referred to Scribonius Largus (who wrote a list of prescriptions around 47 AD) and gave an alternative etymology, based on γόνος (gonos, 'offspring', 'seed'), the meaning of the name then being the Latin foecundus, i.e. 'fecund', 'with many offspring'. The Flora of North America says that a derivation meaning 'many seeds' is the "grammatically correct interpretation".

Many members of the family Polygonaceae that are now placed in separate genera were at one time or other placed in Polygonum, including species of Fagopyrum, Fallopia, Persicaria and Reynoutria, and older sources frequently use much wider definitions of the genus. Molecular phylogenetic studies, particularly in the 21st century, have led to major changes. Clarifying the circumscription of genera split from Polygonum was described in 2015 as "still ongoing".

=== Classification and phylogeny ===
Polygonum is placed in the tribe Polygoneae of the subfamily Polygonoideae. Within the tribe, it is most closely related to the genera Duma and Atraphaxis, forming the so-called "DAP clade".

- Polygoneae
  - Knorringia
  - - - Polygonum ciliinode (syn. Fallopia ciliinodis)
      - DAP clade
        - Duma
        - - Atraphaxis
          - Polygonum
    - RMF clade
      - Reynoutria
      - - Muehlenbeckia
        - Fallopia s.s.

== Species ==
Between 65 and 300 species have been recognised at various times, depending on the circumscription of the genus. A number of species that had been included in Polygonum have been moved into several other genera, including Bistorta, Fagopyrum, Fallopia, Koenigia, Persicaria and Reynoutria. Other genera, such as Polygonella, have been subsumed into Polygonum.

As of October 2026, Plants of the World Online accepted 174 species.

- Polygonum acerosum Ledeb. ex Meisn.
- Polygonum acetosum M.Bieb.
- Polygonum achoreum S.F.Blake
- Polygonum afghanicum Meisn.
- Polygonum afromontanum Greenway
- Polygonum afyonicum Leblebici & Gemici
- Polygonum agreste Sumnev.
- Polygonum albanicum Jáv.
- Polygonum aleppicum Boiss. & Hausskn.
- Polygonum americanum (Fisch. & C.A.Mey.) T.M.Schust. & Reveal
- Polygonum anatolicum M.Keskin & Eker
- Polygonum arenarium Waldst. & Kit.
- Polygonum arenastrum Boreau
- Polygonum argyrocoleon Steud. ex Kunze
- Polygonum articulatum L.
- Polygonum arussense Chiov.
- Polygonum aschersonianum H.Gross
- Polygonum austiniae Greene
- Polygonum aviculare L.
- Polygonum balansae Boiss.
- Polygonum basiramia (Small) T.M.Schust. & Reveal
- Polygonum bellardii All.
- Polygonum biaristatum Aitch. & Hemsl.
- Polygonum bidwelliae S.Watson
- Polygonum bolanderi W.H.Brewer ex A.Gray
- Polygonum boreale (Lange) Small
- Polygonum bornmuelleri Litv.
- Polygonum bowenkampii Phil.
- Polygonum brasiliense K.Koch
- Polygonum breviarticulatum Rech.f.
- Polygonum buxiforme Small
- Polygonum californicum Meisn.
- Polygonum cappadocicum Boiss. & Balansa
- Polygonum carinatum Charit.
- Polygonum cascadense W.H.Baker
- Polygonum cashmirense H.Gross
- Polygonum caspicum Kom.
- Polygonum cedrorum Boiss. & Kotschy
- Polygonum chaturbhujanum K.C.Mohan
- Polygonum cognatum Meisn.
- Polygonum corrigioloides Jaub. & Spach
- Polygonum czukavinae Soják
- Polygonum delfini Phil.
- Polygonum delopyrum T.M.Schust. & Reveal
- Polygonum dentoceras T.M.Schust. & Reveal
- Polygonum douglasii Greene
- Polygonum effusum Meisn.
- Polygonum ekimianum Leblebici, H.Duman & Aytaç
- Polygonum elazigense Behçet
- Polygonum engelmannii Greene
- Polygonum equisetiforme Sm.
- Polygonum erectum L.
- Polygonum euxinum Chrtek
- Polygonum evenkiense Tupitz. & Juzeph.
- Polygonum excelsius (Karlsson) Uotila
- Polygonum expansum Charit.
- Polygonum fibrilliferum Kom.
- Polygonum fimbriatum Elliott
- Polygonum floribundum Schltdl. ex Spreng.
- Polygonum fowleri B.L.Rob.
- Polygonum fragile Sumnev.
- Polygonum fusco-ochreatum Kom.
- Polygonum gabrielae Costea & Tardif
- Polygonum glaucum Nutt.
- Polygonum graminifolium Wierzb. ex Heuff.
- Polygonum gussonei Tod.
- Polygonum heterosepalum M.Peck & Ownbey
- Polygonum hickmanii H.R.Hinds & Rand.Morgan
- Polygonum hohuanshanense S.S.Ying
- Polygonum huichunense F.Z.Li, Y.T.Hou & C.Y.Qu
- Polygonum humifusum C.Merck ex K.Koch
- Polygonum hyrcanicum Rech.f.
- Polygonum icaricum Rech.f.
- Polygonum idaeum Hayek
- Polygonum ilanense Y.C.Liu & C.H.Ou
- Polygonum inflexum Kom.
- Polygonum intramongolicum A.J.Li ex Borodina
- Polygonum iranicum Mozaff.
- Polygonum istanbulicum M.Keskin
- Polygonum jaxarticum Sumnev.
- Polygonum karacae Ziel. & Borat.
- Polygonum lacerum Kunth
- Polygonum libani Boiss.
- Polygonum longiocreatum Bartlett
- Polygonum longipes Halácsy & Charrel
- Polygonum loshanense S.S.Ying
- Polygonum luzuloides Jaub. & Spach
- Polygonum majus (Meisn.) Piper
- Polygonum marinense T.R.Mert. & P.H.Raven
- Polygonum maritimum L.
- Polygonum melihae Gemici & Kit Tan
- Polygonum mersinicum M.Keskin
- Polygonum mesembricum Chrtek
- Polygonum mezianum H.Gross
- Polygonum minimum S.Watson
- Polygonum mirajabii Chaudhri
- Polygonum molliiforme Boiss.
- Polygonum neglectum Besser
- Polygonum nesomii T.M.Schust. & Reveal
- Polygonum nikolai Tupitz.
- Polygonum norvegicum (Sam.) Lid
- Polygonum novoascanicum Klokov
- Polygonum nuttallii Small
- Polygonum oktaysinanoglui M.Keskin
- Polygonum olivascens Rech.f. & Schiman-Czeika
- Polygonum oxyspermum C.A.Mey. & Bunge ex Ledeb.
- Polygonum palaestinum Zohary
- Polygonum papillosum Hartvig
- Polygonum parksii (Cory) T.M.Schust. & Reveal
- Polygonum paronychia Cham. & Schltdl.
- Polygonum paronychioides C.A.Mey.
- Polygonum parryi Greene
- Polygonum patuliforme Vorosch.
- Polygonum patulum M.Bieb.
- Polygonum plebeium R.Br.
- Polygonum podlechii Rech.f. & Schiman-Czeika
- Polygonum polycnemoides Jaub. & Spach
- Polygonum polygaloides Meisn.
- Polygonum polygamum Vent.
- Polygonum polyneuron Franch. & Sav.
- Polygonum psammophilum (Bordz. ex Tzvelev) Tzvelev
- Polygonum × pseudobellardii Hausskn.
- Polygonum × pseudopulchellum Hausskn.
- Polygonum raii Bab.
- Polygonum ramosissimum Michx.
- Polygonum ramuliflorum Kitag.
- Polygonum recumbens Royle ex Bab.
- Polygonum rigidum Skvortsov
- Polygonum roberti Loisel.
- Polygonum romanum Jacq.
- Polygonum rottboellioides Jaub. & Spach
- Polygonum rupestre Kar. & Kir.
- Polygonum rurivagum Jord. ex Boreau
- Polygonum sabulosum Vorosch.
- Polygonum sajanense Tupitz. & Shaulo
- Polygonum salebrosum Coode & Cullen
- Polygonum salsugineum M.Bieb.
- Polygonum samsunicum Yıld. & Leblebici
- Polygonum sarobiense Rech.f.
- Polygonum sawatchense Small
- Polygonum schistosum Czukav.
- Polygonum scoparium Req. ex Loisel.
- Polygonum setosum Jacq.
- Polygonum shastense W.H.Brewer ex A.Gray
- Polygonum shiheziense F.Z.Li, Y.T.Hou & F.J.Lu
- Polygonum shuchengense Z.Z.Zhou
- Polygonum shuense A.J.Li & B.J.Bao
- Polygonum sivasicum Kit Tan & Yıldız
- Polygonum smallianum T.M.Schust. & Reveal
- Polygonum snijmaniae S.Ortiz
- Polygonum spergulariiforme Meisn. ex Small
- Polygonum striatulum B.L.Rob.
- Polygonum stypticum Cham. & Schltdl.
- Polygonum subaphyllum Sumnev.
- Polygonum sumatranum Bruijn
- Polygonum sylvaticum Skvortsov
- Polygonum tachengense F.Z.Li, Y.T.Hou & F.J.Lu
- Polygonum taiwanense S.S.Ying
- Polygonum tenerum Spreng.
- Polygonum tenorei C.Presl
- Polygonum tenue Michx.
- Polygonum tenuissimum A.I.Baranov & Skvortsov ex Vorosch.
- Polygonum terzioglui Makbul, Coşkunç. & Kundakçı
- Polygonum thymifolium Jaub. & Spach
- Polygonum turkestanicum Sumnev.
- Polygonum undulatum (L.) P.J.Bergius
- Polygonum uniflorum Y.X.Ma & Y.T.Zhao
- Polygonum urnigera M.Keskin
- Polygonum urumqiense F.Z.Li, Y.T.Hou & F.J.Lu
- Polygonum utahense Brenckle & Cottam
- Polygonum uysalii Makbul, Coşkunç. & Kundakçı
- Polygonum viale Charit.
- Polygonum volchovense Tzvelev
- Polygonum vvedenskyi Sumnev.

=== Reclassified species ===
Many species formerly placed in Polygonum have been moved to other genera in the subfamily Polygonoideae. Some synonyms are listed below.

==== Polygonum species that have been reclassified as Bistorta ====
- Polygonum amplexicaule → Bistorta amplexicaulis
- Polygonum bistorta – bistort → Bistorta officinalis
- Polygonum bistortoides Pursh – American bistort, western bistort, smokeweed or mountain meadow knotweed → Bistorta bistortoides
- Polygonum tenuicaule Bisset & S.Moore → Bistorta tenuicaulis
- Polygonum viviparum – alpine bistort → Bistorta vivipara

==== Polygonum species that have been reclassified as Fagopyrum ====
- Polygonum fagopyrum L. – buckwheat → Fagopyrum esculentum

==== Polygonum species that have been reclassified as Fallopia ====
- Polygonum aubertii L.Henry → Fallopia aubertii
- Polygonum baldschuanicum Regel – Russian vine → Fallopia baldschuanica
- Polygonum convolvulus L. – black bindweed, wild buckwheat → Fallopia convolvulus
- Polygonum dumetorum L. → Fallopia dumetorum
- Polygonum scandens L. → Fallopia scandens

==== Polygonum species that have been reclassified as Koenigia ====
- Polygonum alpinum → Koenigia alpina
- Polygonum campanulatum – lesser knotweed, bellflower smartweed → Koenigia campanulata
- Polygonum davisiae W.H. Brewer ex A. Gray and Polygonum newberryi Small → Koenigia davisiae
- Polygonum molle → Koenigia mollis
- Polygonum polystachyum Wall. ex Meisn. → Koenigia polystachya

==== Polygonum species that have been reclassified as Persicaria ====
- Polygonum alatum → Persicaria nepalensis
- Polygonum amphibium – amphibious bistort, longroot smartweed, water smartweed → Persicaria amphibia
- Polygonum capitatum – pinkhead smartweed → Persicaria capitata
- Polygonum chinense L. → Persicaria chinensis
- Polygonum coccineum Muhl. ex Willd. → Persicaria amphibia
- Polygonum filiforme Thunb. → Persicaria filiformis
- Polygonum hydropiper – water-pepper → Persicaria hydropiper
- Polygonum hydropiperoides Michx. – swamp smartweed → Persicaria hydropiperoides
- Polygonum lapathifolium – pale persicaria or nodding smartweed → Persicaria lapathifolia
- Polygonum longisetum → Persicaria longiseta
- Polygonum minus – small water-pepper → Persicaria minor
- Polygonum mite Schrank – tasteless water-pepper → Persicaria mitis (Schrank) Assenov
- Polygonum nepalense → Persicaria nepalensis
- Polygonum odoratum Lour. – Vietnamese coriander → Persicaria odorata
- Polygonum orientale → Persicaria orientalis
- Polygonum pensylvanicum – Pennsylvania smartweed or pink knotweed or pinkweed → Persicaria pensylvanica
- Polygonum perfoliata – Asiatic Tearthumb → Persicaria perfoliata
- Polygonum persicaria – redshank or persicaria or lady's thumb → Persicaria maculosa
- Polygonum praetermissum → Persicaria praetermissa
- Polygonum punctatum Elliott – dotted smartweed → Persicaria punctata
- Polygonum runcinatum → Persicaria runcinata
- Polygonum sagittatum – arrowleaf tearthumb, American tear-thumb or scratchgrass → Persicaria sagittata
- Polygonum tinctorium → Persicaria tinctoria
- Polygonum virginianum L. → Persicaria virginiana

==== Polygonum species that have been reclassified as Reynoutria ====
- Polygonum multiflorum Thunb. → Reynoutria multiflora
- Polygonum cuspidatum Siebold & Zucc. – Japanese knotweed → Reynoutria japonica
- Polygonum sachalinense F.Schmidt – giant knotweed → Reynoutria sachalinensis

=== Unresolved species ===
- Polygonum vaccinifolium Wall. is an unresolved species name. Persicaria vaccinifolia may be a synonym.

== Uses ==
Several species can be eaten cooked, for example during famines. The species Polygonum cognatum, known locally as "madimak", is regularly consumed in central parts of Turkey.

== References in literature ==
In The Man Who Laughs Victor Hugo wrote of the Comprachicos (child-buyers) who created artificial dwarfs, formed "by anointing babies' spines with the grease of bats, moles and dormice" and using drugs such as "dwarf elder, knotgrass, and daisy juice". The idea of such use was also known to Shakespeare, as Beatrice K. Otto pointed out, quoting A Midsummer Night's Dream:

Get you gone, dwarf;
You minimus, of hindering knot-grass made;
