= Polygonum spergulariiforme =

Scientific classification
- Kingdom: Plantae
- Clade: Tracheophytes
- Clade: Angiosperms
- Clade: Eudicots
- Order: Caryophyllales
- Family: Polygonaceae
- Genus: Polygonum
- Species: P. spergulariiforme

Binomial name
- Polygonum spergulariiforme Meisn. ex Small 1892

Synonyms
- Polygonum sperguliaeforme Meisn. ex Small; Polygonum douglasii subsp. spergulariiforme (Meisn. ex Small) J.C. Hickman; Polygonum coarctatum Dougl. ex Meisn. 1856 not Meisn. 1826

Species of flowering plant

Polygonum spergulariiforme is a North American species of flowering plants in the buckwheat family known by the common name spurry knotweed or fall knotweed. It grows in western Canada (British Columbia and Saskatchewan) and the western United States (primarily Washington, Oregon, and northern and central California but with a few isolated populations in Idaho, Wyoming and Montana).

Polygonum spergulariiforme is a green, branching herb up to 50 cm (20 in) tall. Leaves are narrow, up to 6 cm (2.4 in) long. Flowers are pink or white, in dense, elongated clumps. The plant flowers from June to October, later than some of its relatives.
