= Polygonum heterosepalum =

Scientific classification
- Kingdom: Plantae
- Clade: Tracheophytes
- Clade: Angiosperms
- Clade: Eudicots
- Order: Caryophyllales
- Family: Polygonaceae
- Genus: Polygonum
- Species: P. heterosepalum

Binomial name
- Polygonum heterosepalum M.Peck & Ownbey 1950

Species of flowering plant

Polygonum heterosepalum, common name dwarf desert knotweed or oddsepal knotweed, is a plant species native to the Great Basin Desert in southwestern Idaho, northern Nevada, northeastern California, and southwestern Oregon. It has been reported from 1 county in California (Modoc), 4 in Nevada (Washoe, Humboldt, Elko and Lander), 4 in Idaho (Owyhee, Twin Falls, Elmore and Gooding), and 5 in Oregon (Lake, Malheur, Harney, Grant and Crook). The species occurs in dry, open sites in sagebrush plains and pine woodlands.

Polygonum heterosepalum is a short herb up to 5 centimetres (2.0 in) tall, forming mats that seem rather moss-like. Stems are green or red. Leaves are densely packed, narrow up to 3 millimetres (0.12 in) long. Flowers are white, sometimes pink along margins, borne in groups of 2–3 in the axils of the leaves, slightly zygomorphic with some tepals longer than the others.
