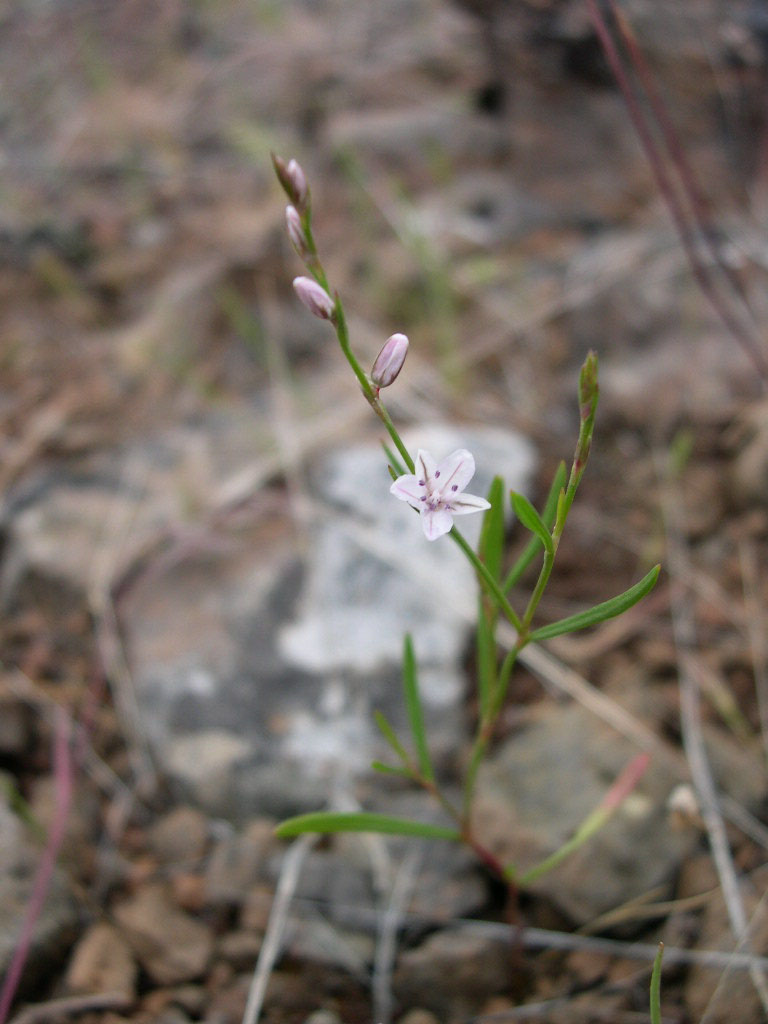

Conservation status
- Critically Imperiled (NatureServe)

Scientific classification
- Kingdom: Plantae
- Clade: Embryophytes
- Clade: Tracheophytes
- Clade: Spermatophytes
- Clade: Angiosperms
- Clade: Eudicots
- Order: Caryophyllales
- Family: Polygonaceae
- Genus: Polygonum
- Species: P. majus

Binomial name
- Polygonum majus (Meisn.) Piper 1901

Synonyms
- Polygonum coarctatum var. majus Meisn. 1856; Polygonum douglasii subsp. majus (Meisn.) J.C. Hickman

= Polygonum majus =

Species of flowering plant

Polygonum majus is a North American species of flowering plant in the buckwheat family known by the common name wiry knotweed. It grows in the western United States and western Canada, from British Columbia south as far as the Sierra Nevada of northwestern Inyo County in California, east as far as Montana.

== Description ==
Polygonum majus is an herb up to 60 cm (2 feet) tall. Stems are thin and wiry. Flowers are white or pink.
