= Polygonum bolanderi =

Scientific classification
- Kingdom: Plantae
- Clade: Tracheophytes
- Clade: Angiosperms
- Clade: Eudicots
- Order: Caryophyllales
- Family: Polygonaceae
- Genus: Polygonum
- Species: P. bolanderi

Binomial name
- Polygonum bolanderi W.H.Brewer 1872

Synonyms
- Duravia bolanderi (W.H.Brewer) Greene

Species of flowering plant

Polygonum bolanderi is an uncommon California species of flowering plant in the buckwheat family known by the common name Bolander's knotweed.

== Distribution ==
Polygonum bolanderi is endemic to northern California, where it is known from the northern Coast Ranges, the southern Cascades, and the northern Sierra Nevada (from Humboldt County and Shasta, south as far as Sonoma county and Tuolumne County). It can be found in open, rocky habitats.

== Description ==
Polygonum bolanderi is a small shrub producing numerous very thin twiglike branches up to about half a meter (20 inches) long from a tough, tangled base. The slender branches are lined with small, narrow, pointed leaves which are alternately arranged and mostly found clustered toward the tips of the twigs. The leaves have narrow, fringed stipules with sharp points. Flowers occur in upper leaf axils during summer and fall. They are whitish or pink with dark midveins on each corolla lobe.
