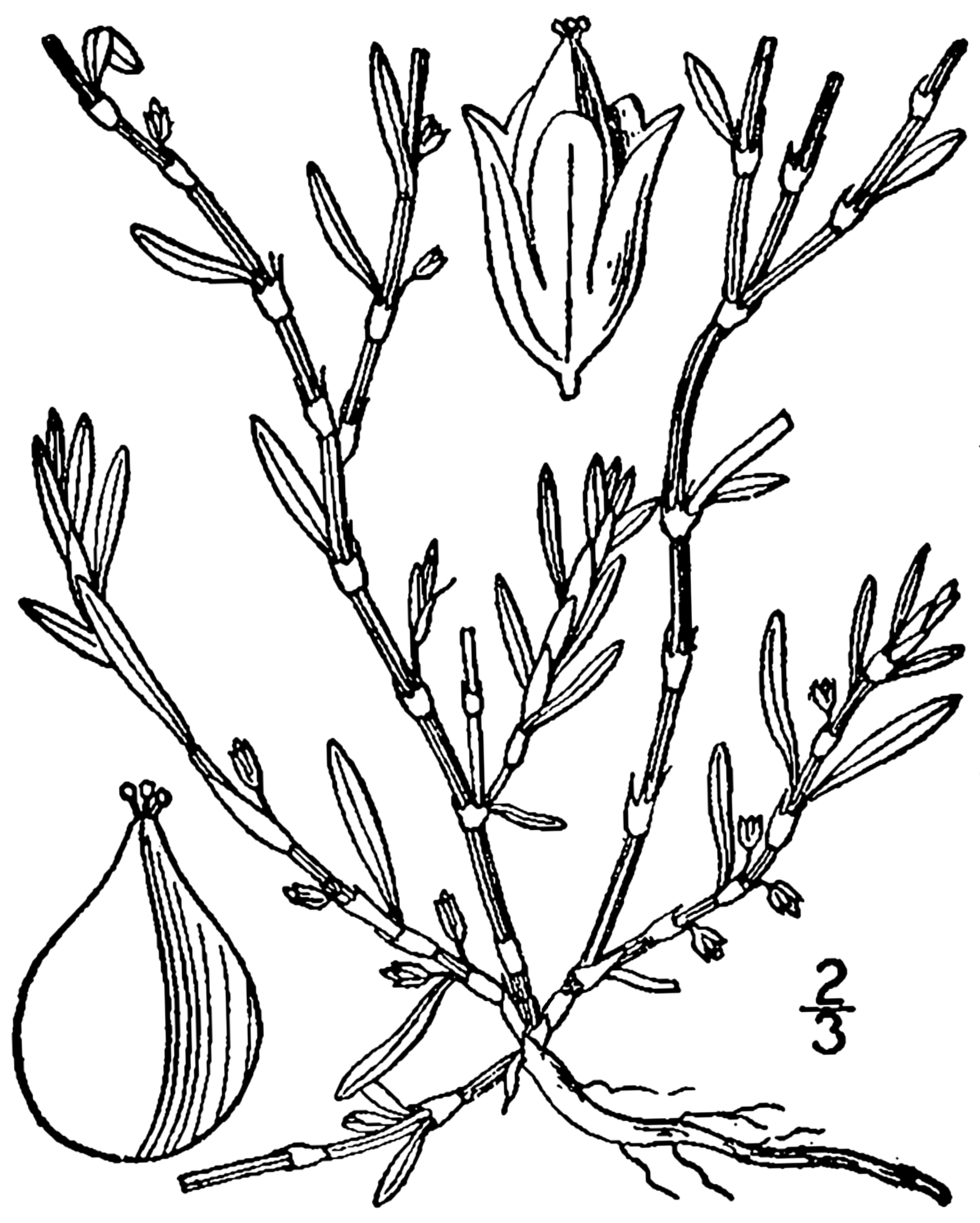

Scientific classification
- Kingdom: Plantae
- Clade: Tracheophytes
- Clade: Angiosperms
- Clade: Eudicots
- Order: Caryophyllales
- Family: Polygonaceae
- Genus: Polygonum
- Species: P. glaucum

Binomial name
- Polygonum glaucum Nutt. 1818

= Polygonum glaucum =

Species of flowering plant

Polygonum glaucum, common names seabeach knotweed and seaside knotweed, is a North American species of plant in the buckwheat family. It grows on the Atlantic Coast of the United States, from Alabama to Massachusetts, including in salt-water inlets such as Chesapeake Bay and the Hudson River.

Polygonum glaucum is a branching herb up to 70 cm (28 in) tall. It appears silvery of bluish-green because of wax covering the leaves and stem. Flowers are pink or white, produced in groups of 1–3. It grows on beaches, sand dunes, and the edges of coastal marshes.
