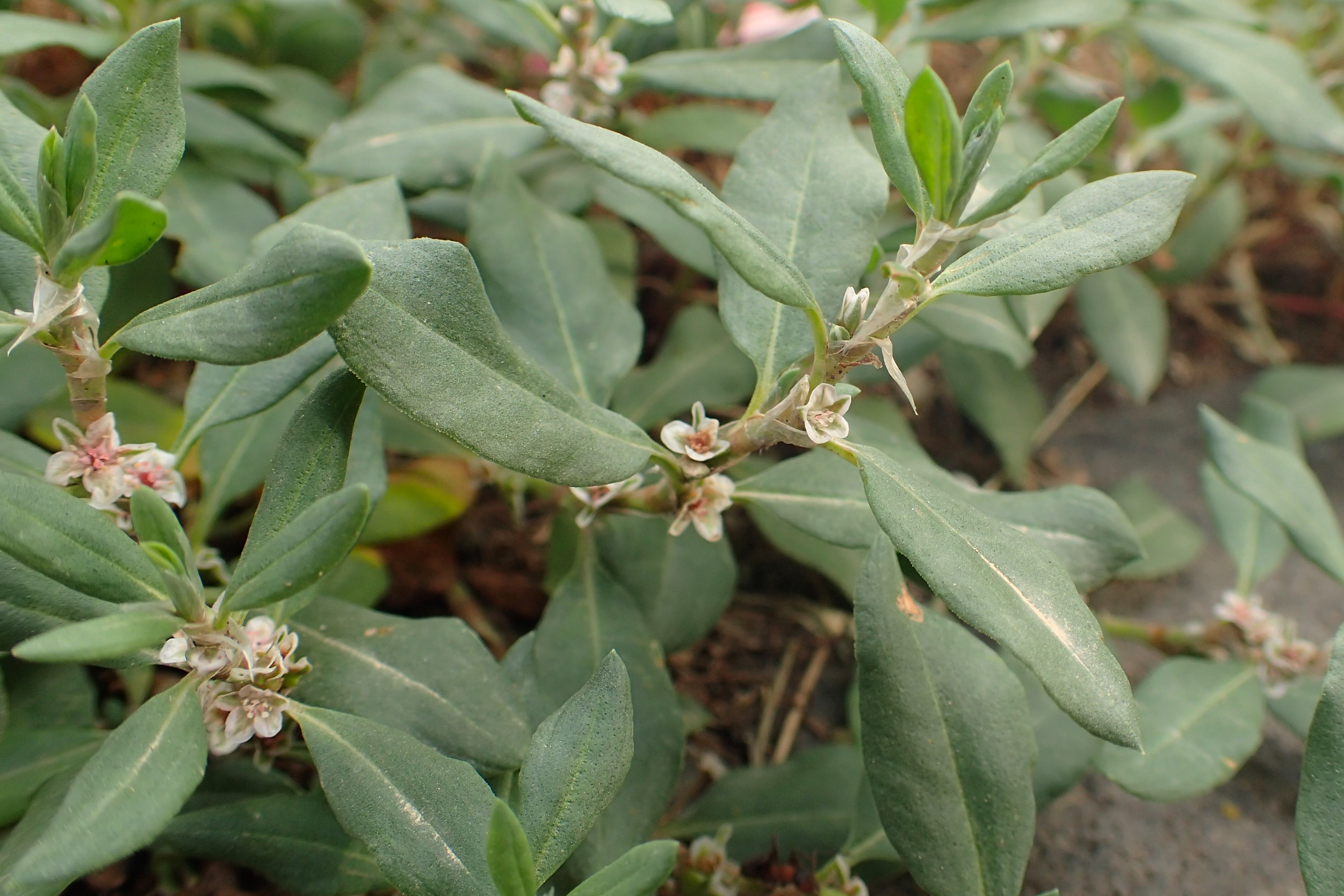

Scientific classification
- Kingdom: Plantae
- Clade: Tracheophytes
- Clade: Angiosperms
- Clade: Eudicots
- Order: Caryophyllales
- Family: Polygonaceae
- Genus: Polygonum
- Species: P. cognatum

Binomial name
- Polygonum cognatum Meisn., 1826

Synonyms
- Polygonum alpestre C.A.Mey.; Polygonum ammanioides Jaub. & Spach; Polygonum myriophyllum H. Gross; Polygonum rupestre Kar. & Kir.; Polygonum chitralicum Rech. f. & Schiman-Czeika

= Polygonum cognatum =

Species of plant

Polygonum cognatum, commonly called Indian knotgrass or madimak (from Turkish madımak), is an edible weedy creeping perennial herb in the genus Polygonum, frequently eaten by people of Turkey. It has larger leaves than most other species of Polygonum.

== Description ==
Polygonum cognatum is a perennial, prostrate or ascending branched herb, 15–30 cm long with a thick stout root stock. Stems are prostrate, green like the leaves. Leaves oblong-elliptic, petiolate, often slightly mucronate. Flowers in bundles in the leaf axils. Perianth pinkish, 4–5 mm, hardening and accrescent in fruit. Nut glossy, included in the perianth.

== Habitat ==
Irano-Turanian Region or Iran-Turan Plant Geography Region element, grows between 760 and 5600 meters elevation on rocky and drier slopes; distribution: Central to Western Asia, Turkey, Caucasia (Georgia), Iran, Afghanistan and Pakistan. The madimak is a weed found in both agricultural and non-agricultural areas.

== Subspecies ==
- Polygonum cognatum subsp. chitralicum (syn: P. chitralicum): endemic in Chitral, Pakistan.
- Polygonum cognatum subsp. cognatum (syn: P. cognatum var. alpestre, P. confertum, P. ammanioides, P. pamiroalaicum)

== Cuisine ==
The madimak is one of the widely known traditional edible plants in Turkey particularly Central Anatolia Region. To be able to compensate increasing demand easily and supply the plant to the markets, farmers started cultivating madimak in Central Anatolia.

== Pharmacology ==
The highest antioxidant activity was found in the water extract.
