= Polygonum cascadense =

Scientific classification
- Kingdom: Plantae
- Clade: Tracheophytes
- Clade: Angiosperms
- Clade: Eudicots
- Order: Caryophyllales
- Family: Polygonaceae
- Genus: Polygonum
- Species: P. cascadense

Binomial name
- Polygonum cascadense W.H.Baker 1949

Species of flowering plant

Polygonum cascadense is a species of flowering plant in the buckwheat family known by the common name Cascade knotweed. It has been found only in the State of Oregon in the northwestern United States, in the Cascades and in the Blue Mountains.

== Description ==
Polygonum cascadense is an herb with a green or red zigzag stem up to 15 cm (5.9 in) tall. It produces small groups of white flowers with red anthers.
