= Polygonum parryi =

Scientific classification
- Kingdom: Plantae
- Clade: Tracheophytes
- Clade: Angiosperms
- Clade: Eudicots
- Order: Caryophyllales
- Family: Polygonaceae
- Genus: Polygonum
- Species: P. parryi

Binomial name
- Polygonum parryi Greene 1891

Species of flowering plant

Polygonum parryi is a species of flowering plant in the knotweed family known by the common names Parry's knotweed and prickly knotweed. It is native to the western United States from Washington to California, where it grows in several types of moist, open habitat in mountainous and coastal areas.

== Description ==
Polygonum parryi is a small annual herb forming mats or cushions of short, angled stems growing erect up to 7 or 8 centimeters (2.8–3.2 inches) in height. The greenish brown stems are lined densely and evenly with linear, spine-tipped leaves. The lowest leaves are longest, reaching up to 2 centimeters (0.8 inches) long, while leaves near the branch tips are small and scale-like. Each leaf has a thin, wide stipule which forms a fringed, fibrous ochrea around the base of the leaf. White flowers less than 2 millimeters (0.08 inches) wide occur in the leaf axils.
