= Polygonum boreale =

Scientific classification
- Kingdom: Plantae
- Clade: Tracheophytes
- Clade: Angiosperms
- Clade: Eudicots
- Order: Caryophyllales
- Family: Polygonaceae
- Genus: Polygonum
- Species: P. boreale

Binomial name
- Polygonum boreale (Lange) Small

Species of flowering plant

Polygonum boreale is a species of flowering plant belonging to the family Polygonaceae.

Its native range is Canada to Subarctic Eurasia.
