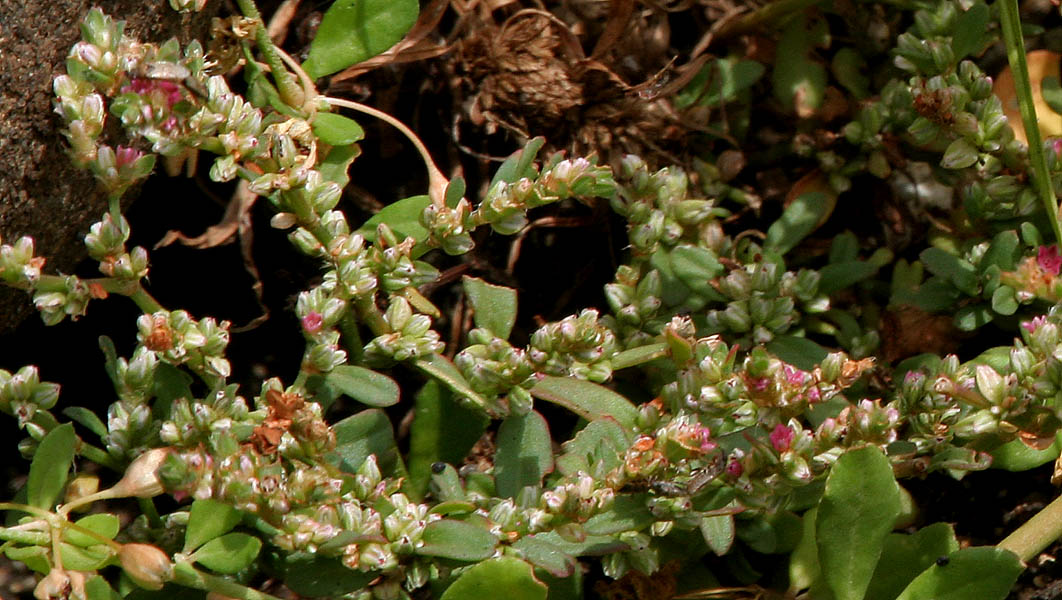

Conservation status
- Least Concern (IUCN 3.1)

Scientific classification
- Kingdom: Plantae
- Clade: Tracheophytes
- Clade: Angiosperms
- Clade: Eudicots
- Order: Caryophyllales
- Family: Polygonaceae
- Genus: Polygonum
- Species: P. plebeium

Binomial name
- Polygonum plebeium R.Br.

= Polygonum plebeium =

Species of flowering plant

Polygonum plebeium, (common name - common knotweed), is a species of flowering plant in the knotweed family, first described in 1810 by Robert Brown from a specimen collected in Port Jackson, Australia.

== Distribution ==
It is native to Australia, Africa (including Botswana, Ethiopia, Madagascar, Nigeria, .Zimbabwe, Zambia. ) and Asia ( including China, Korea, Mongolia, Kazakhstan and Manchuria, Bangladesh and India), but is an introduced species in the U.S., Germany, and Japan.

It occurs in disturbed habitats that frequently are flooded, such as banks, ditches, and rice fields. It is used as a vegetable in food in some locations.

== Names in India ==
Hindi: मचेची Machechi • Meitei: তৰাকমনা Tarakmana • Marathi: गुलाबी गोधडी Gulabi Godhadi • Bengali: Chemti sag • Oriya: Muthisag • Gujarati: Zinako Okhrad • Sanskrit: सर्पाक्षी Sarpakshee at Pocharam lake, Andhra Pradesh, India.
