= Polygonum albanicum =

Scientific classification
- Kingdom: Plantae
- Clade: Tracheophytes
- Clade: Angiosperms
- Clade: Eudicots
- Order: Caryophyllales
- Family: Polygonaceae
- Genus: Polygonum
- Species: P. albanicum

Binomial name
- Polygonum albanicum Jàv. 1921

Species of plant

Polygonum albanicum (Albanian: Nejca shqiptare) is a flowering herbaceous plant of the knotweed family. It is a trans-regional species primarily found in Albania and recently in its neighboring countries.

== History and distribution ==
Polygonum albanicum was discovered and described from material collected on serpentine by the Hungarian florist and plant systematics Sándor Jávorka (1883–1961) in northern Albania in 1921. It was collected as well by Alston & Sandwith in southern Albania. Since that time the species had rarely been collected and was included in Flora Europaea (Webb & Chatter, 1964: 78) only as a note under P. arenarium subsp. Putchellum (Loisel.). After World War II, in 1954 it was collected by W. Ludwig in central Yugoslavia (BP. material, ex. Marburg), still on serpentine soil though outside Albania, whereas in August 1960, Polygonum albanicum was found on Vourinos mountain in northern Greece, where it had never been previously reported.

== Description ==
Polygonum albanicum is an annual flowering herb that reaches 40–50 cm tall, with a wiry stem and stem branches that grow out from the base of the plant in an open form, or laying on ground soil. It has thin and slim pointed leaves, oblong, egg-shaped and without nervatures.

Flowers occur alone or in couples, located on floppy cobs in a branched inflorescence. The perianth has white petals and sepals arranged in a rose-like shape. Polygonum albanicum blooms from June to October.
