= Polygonum patulum =

Scientific classification
- Kingdom: Plantae
- Clade: Tracheophytes
- Clade: Angiosperms
- Clade: Eudicots
- Order: Caryophyllales
- Family: Polygonaceae
- Genus: Polygonum
- Species: P. patulum

Binomial name
- Polygonum patulum M.Bieb. 1808

Synonyms
- Synonymy: Polygonum bellardii var. gracilius Ledeb.; Polygonum bellardii var. patulum (M. Bieb.) Meisn.; Polygonum bordzilowskii Klokov; Polygonum cretaceum Kom.; Polygonum gracilius (Ledeb.) Klokov; Polygonum kotovii Klokov; Polygonum novoascanicum subsp. cretaceum Tzvelev; Polygonum patulum f. gracilius (Ledeb.) I. Grinţ.; Polygonum patulum var. gracilius (Ledeb.) Rouy; Polygonum patulum subsp. kotovii Soó; Polygonum salinum Baranov & Skvortsov; Polygonum spectabile Lehm.

Species of flowering plant

Polygonum patulum, called tree hogweed, is a species of flowering plant in the knotweed family. It is native to the Mediterranean region, eastern Europe, the Caucasus, Siberia, Central Asia, Mongolia, and the Province of Xinjiang in northwestern China. It has also become sparingly naturalized in scattered locations in Australia and North America.

== Description ==
Polygonum patulum is an erect or semi-erect annual herb up to 80 cm (31 in) tall. Leaves are green or blue-green, up to 5 cm (2.0 in) long. Flowers are green, pink, or white.
