= Polygonum delopyrum =

Conservation status
- Apparently Secure (NatureServe)

Scientific classification
- Kingdom: Plantae
- Clade: Tracheophytes
- Clade: Angiosperms
- Clade: Eudicots
- Order: Caryophyllales
- Family: Polygonaceae
- Genus: Polygonum
- Species: P. delopyrum

Binomial name
- Polygonum delopyrum E.L.Bridges & Orzell

Synonyms
- Delopyrum ciliatum (Meisn.) Small; Polygonella ciliata Meisn.

Species of flowering plant

Polygonum delopyrum (synonym Polygonella ciliata), the fringed jointweed or hairy jointweed, is a plant species endemic to Florida. It is found in pinelands and sandy pine barrens at elevations less than 50 m, in central and southern parts of the state.

Polygonum delopyrum is an annual herb up to 110 cm tall, branching above the base. Leaves are narrow and linear, up to 5 cm long, with cilia (long flexible hairs) along the margins. Inflorescence is up to 45 mm long. Flowers are white, some hermaphroditic (male and female together) but others pistillate (female only). Achenes are brown, triangular in cross-section, up to 4 mm long.

== Taxonomy ==
The species was first described in 1856 by Carl Meissner as Polygonella ciliata. It was later placed in the genus Polygonella (under the name Polygonella ciliata) by John Kunkel Small, but in 2015, following a series of molecular phylogenetic studies, this genus was subsumed into Polygonum. However, the name "Polygonum ciliata" had already been used, so the replacement name Polygonum delopyrum was published.

Polygonum basiramia has been treated as a variety of P. delopyrum (under the name Polygonella ciliata var. basiramia) by some authors, but is classed as a separate species by the Flora of North America, Plants of the World Online and other recent publications. It is very similar but branches mostly at or below ground level.
