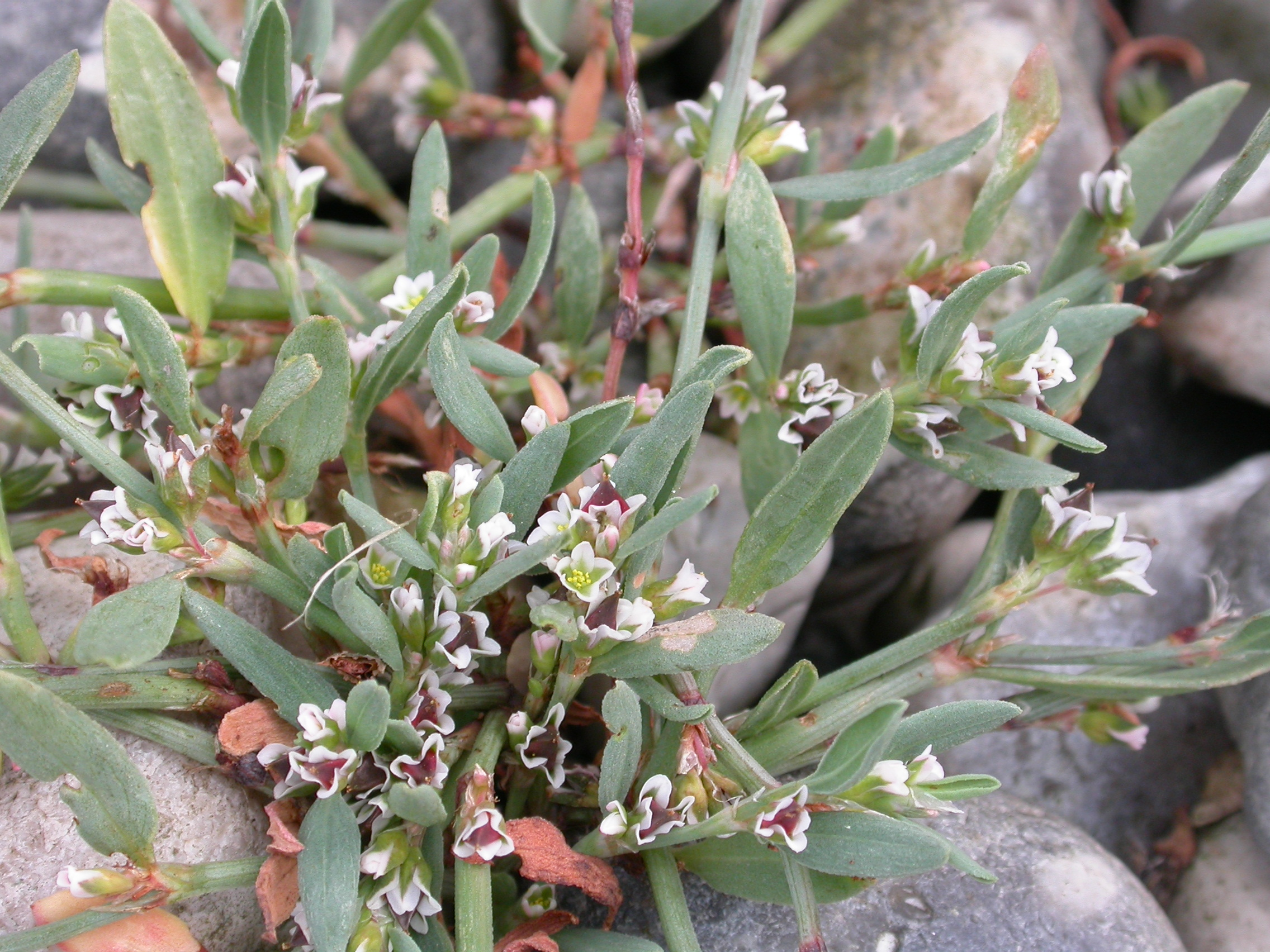

Scientific classification
- Kingdom: Plantae
- Clade: Tracheophytes
- Clade: Angiosperms
- Clade: Eudicots
- Order: Caryophyllales
- Family: Polygonaceae
- Genus: Polygonum
- Species: P. oxyspermum

Binomial name
- Polygonum oxyspermum C.A.Mey. & Bunge ex Ledeb. 1824

Synonyms
- Polygonum acadiense Fernald; Herniaria lenticulata Huds., syn of subsp. raii; Polygonum mesembricum Chrtek, syn of subsp. raii; Polygonum raii Bab., syn of subsp. raii; Polygonum robertii Loisel., syn of subsp. robertii

= Polygonum oxyspermum =

Species of flowering plant

Polygonum oxyspermum is a coastal species of flowering plant in the buckwheat family. It is native to Europe, primarily along the shores of the Atlantic, the North Sea, and the Baltic Sea, from France and Ireland to Finland and Russia. It is also naturalized in eastern Canada and in the US State of Maine.

== Description ==
Polygonum oxyspermum is green or blue-green. Annual, stems prostrate, generally run along the surface of the ground but sometimes do rise above ground level. They can be as much as 100 cm (39 in) long. Leaves are up to 35 mm (1.4 in) long. Flowers are green, white or pink, in axillary clusters.

Subspecies

Three subspecies are widely recognized, although some authors prefer to regard them as distinct species.

- Polygonum oxyspermum subsp. oxyspermum – northern Europe; naturalized in Nova Scotia
- Polygonum oxyspermum subsp. raii (Bab.) D.A.Webb & Chater northern Europe; naturalized in Nova Scotia, Prince Edward Island, New Brunswick, Québec, Maine, Newfoundland
- Polygonum oxyspermum subsp. robertii (Loisel.) Akeroyd & D.A.Webb – Italy
