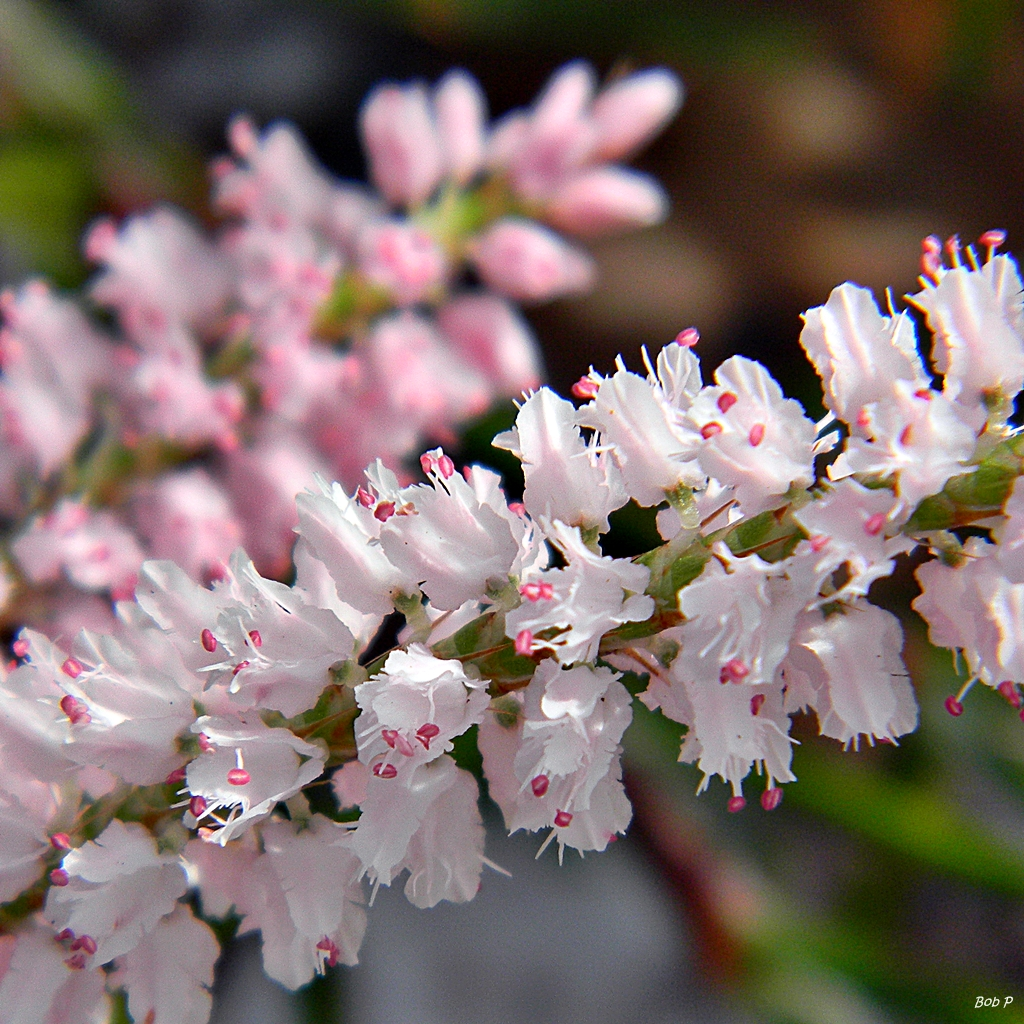

Conservation status
- Apparently Secure (NatureServe)

Scientific classification
- Kingdom: Plantae
- Clade: Embryophytes
- Clade: Tracheophytes
- Clade: Angiosperms
- Clade: Eudicots
- Order: Caryophyllales
- Family: Polygonaceae
- Genus: Polygonum
- Species: P. nesomii

Binomial name
- Polygonum nesomii (Small) T.M.Schust. & Reveal

Synonyms
- Thysanella robusta Small; Polygonella robusta (Small) G.L.Nesom & V.M.Bates; Polygonella fimbriata var. robusta (Small) Horton

= Polygonum nesomii =

Species of flowering plant

Polygonum nesomii is a shrubby perennial flowering plant in the buckwheat (Polygonaceae) family. Common names for it include largeflower jointweed and sandhill wireweed.

P. nesomii produces an abundance of flowers that are surrounded by papery bracts which range in color from white and light pink to deep rose. After flowering, usually in October, the plant maintains a rosette of basal foliage through the winter.

The species was first scientifically described by John Kunkel Small in 1909. It is endemic to the U.S. state of Florida where it is a member of the sandhill plant community.
