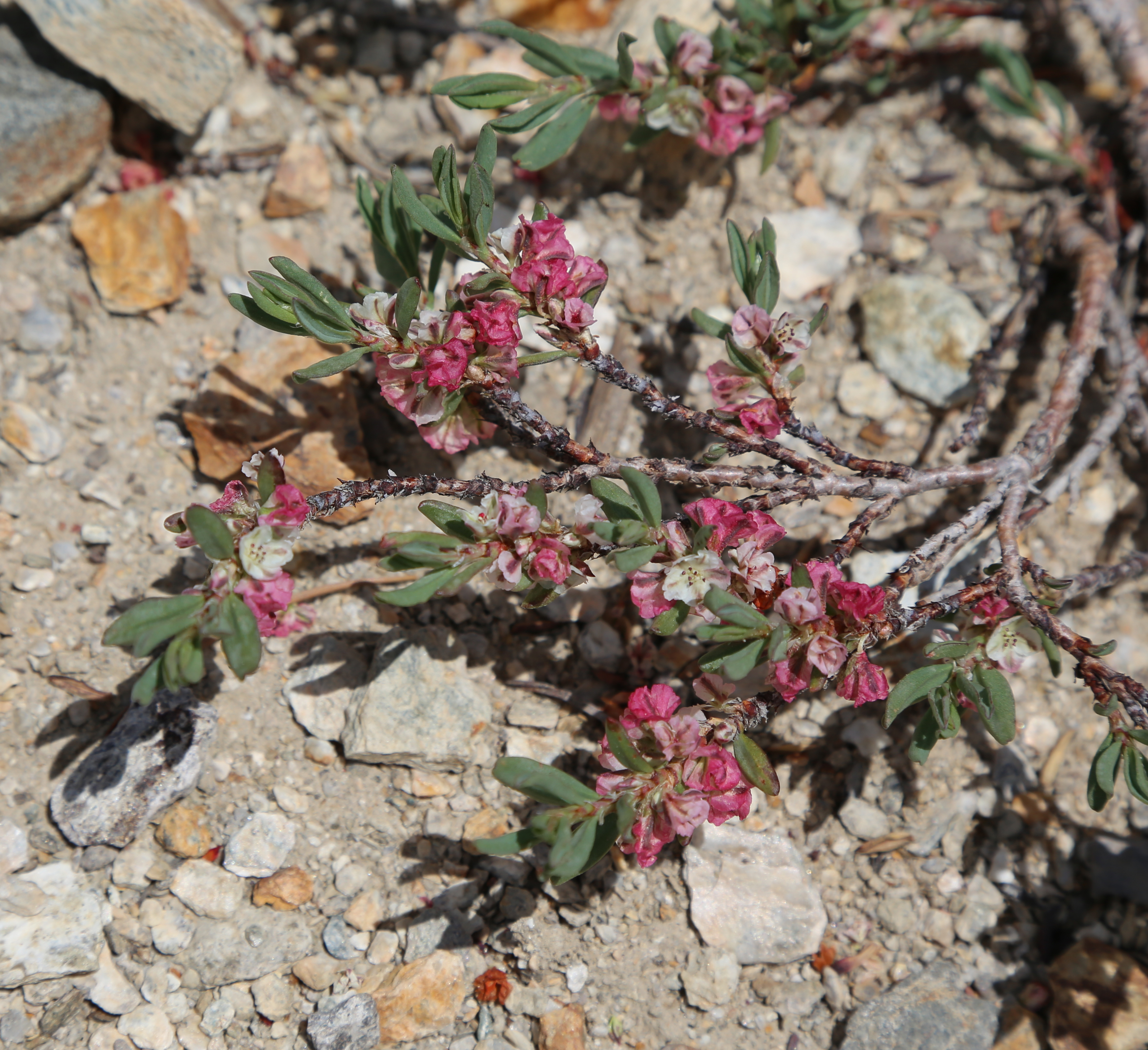

Scientific classification
- Kingdom: Plantae
- Clade: Embryophytes
- Clade: Tracheophytes
- Clade: Spermatophytes
- Clade: Angiosperms
- Clade: Eudicots
- Order: Caryophyllales
- Family: Polygonaceae
- Genus: Polygonum
- Species: P. shastense

Binomial name
- Polygonum shastense W.H.Brewer 1872

= Polygonum shastense =

Species of flowering plant

Polygonum shastense is a species of flowering plant in the knotweed family known by the common name Shasta knotweed. It is native to sections of southwestern Oregon, northwestern Nevada, and northern and central California, where it grows in rocky and gravelly mountainous habitat up to 3300 meters (11,000 feet) elevation. It is most common in the Sierra Nevada. The species name refers to its occurrence on Mount Shasta in Shasta County, California.

== Description ==
Polygonum shastense is a rather elegant small perennial shrub producing branching tough, gnarled brown stems reaching a maximum length of 40 centimeters (16 inches), growing prostrate along the ground or somewhat upright. The bases of old plants can be wide, woody and gray (see image above left).

The leaves lining the slender but rough stems are uniform in size and distribution, not clustered or reduced in size near stem tips. They are lance-shaped with two parallel veins separating three raised areas on the upper surface (see closeup at left), each leaf measuring 5 to 8 millimeters (0.20–0.32 inches) long. Leaves emerge curled slightly and folded in half lengthwise. Leaves have stipules which are widened into membranous ochrea wrapped around the leaf bases.

Flowers occur in clusters in upper leaf axils. Each is just under a centimeter wide and has five rounded petals, either white with a green stripe or pink with a dark stripe. There are 5–8 stamens and a triangular pistil with a 3-lobed style. Plants may have either all white, all pink, or a mixture of flower colors.

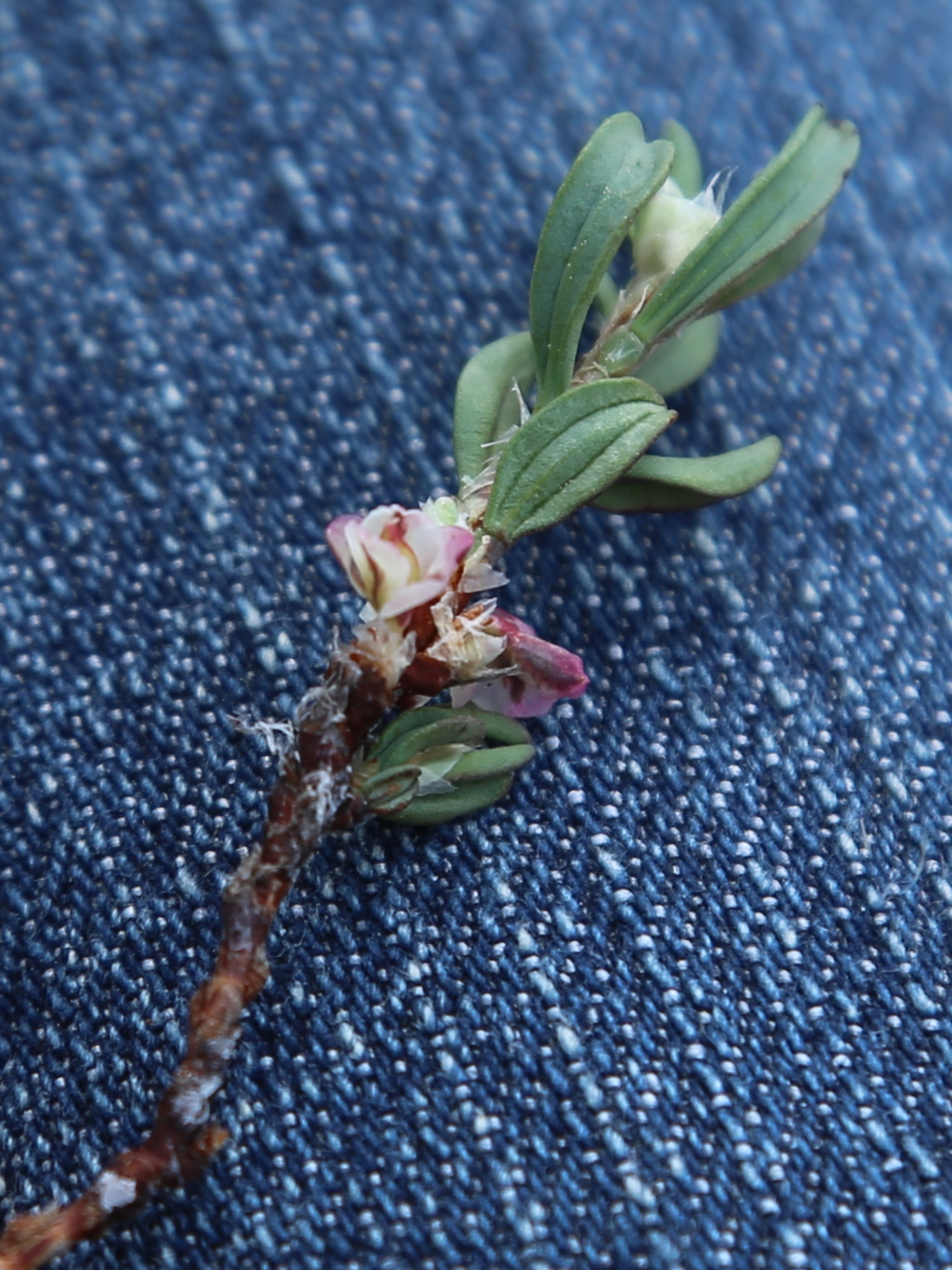
Leaves, with folds & parallel veins

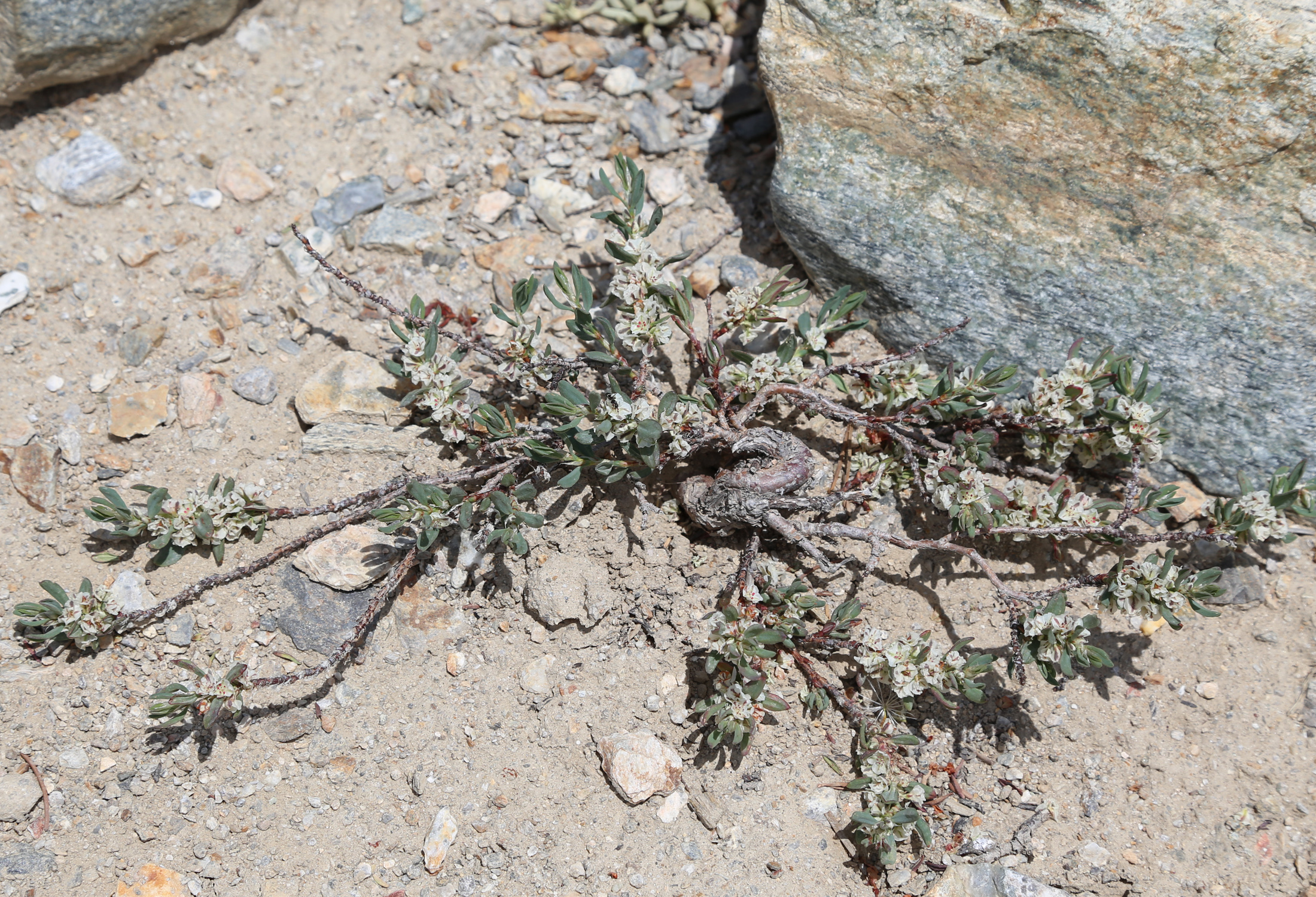
P. shastense low plant

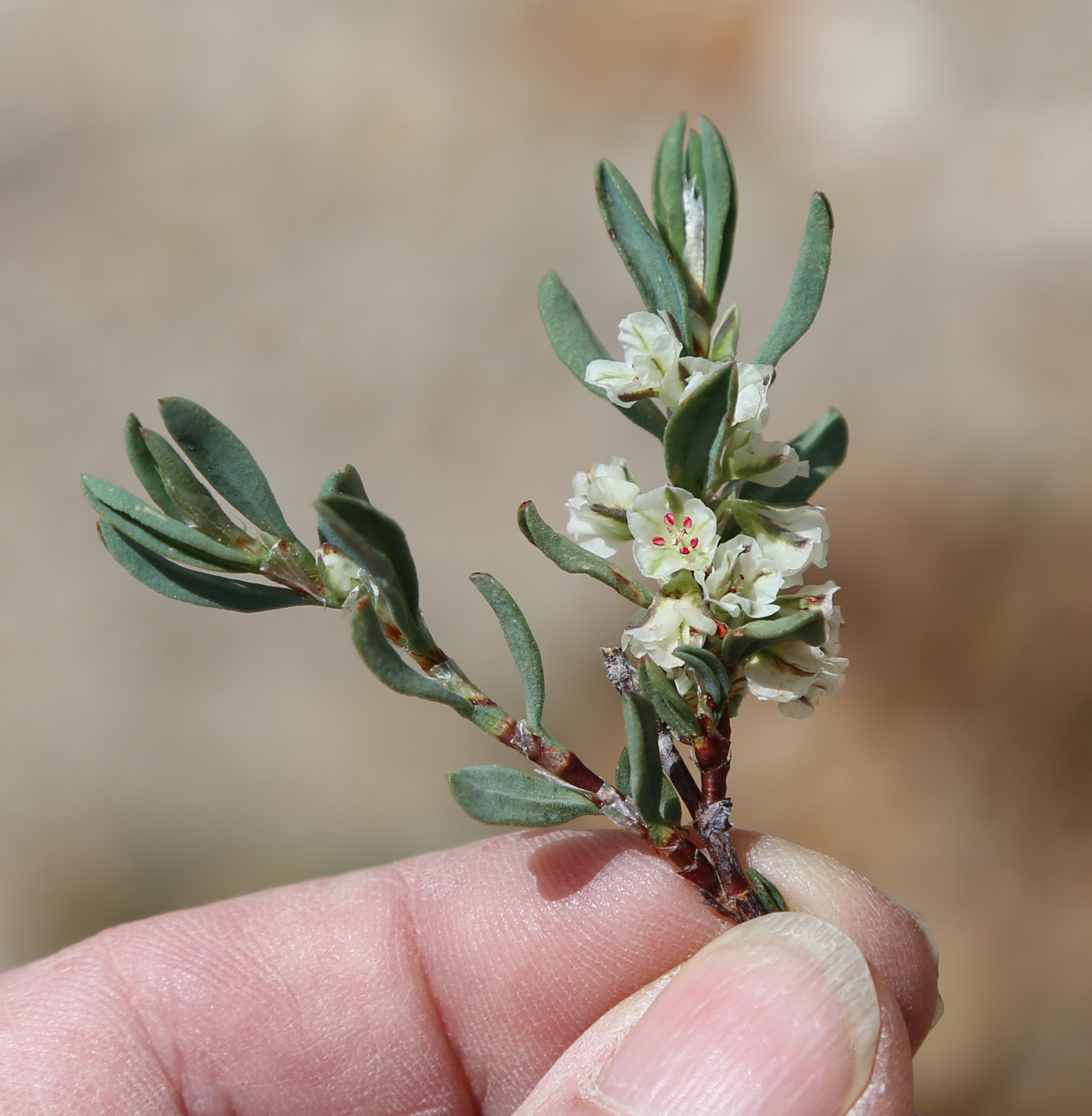
Flower & stem closeup
