= Polygonum nuttallii =

Scientific classification
- Kingdom: Plantae
- Clade: Tracheophytes
- Clade: Angiosperms
- Clade: Eudicots
- Order: Caryophyllales
- Family: Polygonaceae
- Genus: Polygonum
- Species: P. nuttallii

Binomial name
- Polygonum nuttallii Small 1895

Synonyms
- Polygonum intermedium Nutt. ex S. Watson 1882, illegal homonym not Ehrh. 1791; Polygonum douglasii subsp. nuttallii (Small) J.C. Hickman

Species of flowering plant

Polygonum nuttallii is a North American species of flowering plant in the buckwheat family known by the common name Nuttall's knotweed. It grows in the Pacific Northwest, in British Columbia, Washington, and Oregon.

Polygonum nuttallii is an herb up to 35 cm (14 in) tall. Stems are thin and wiry. Flowers are white or pink.
