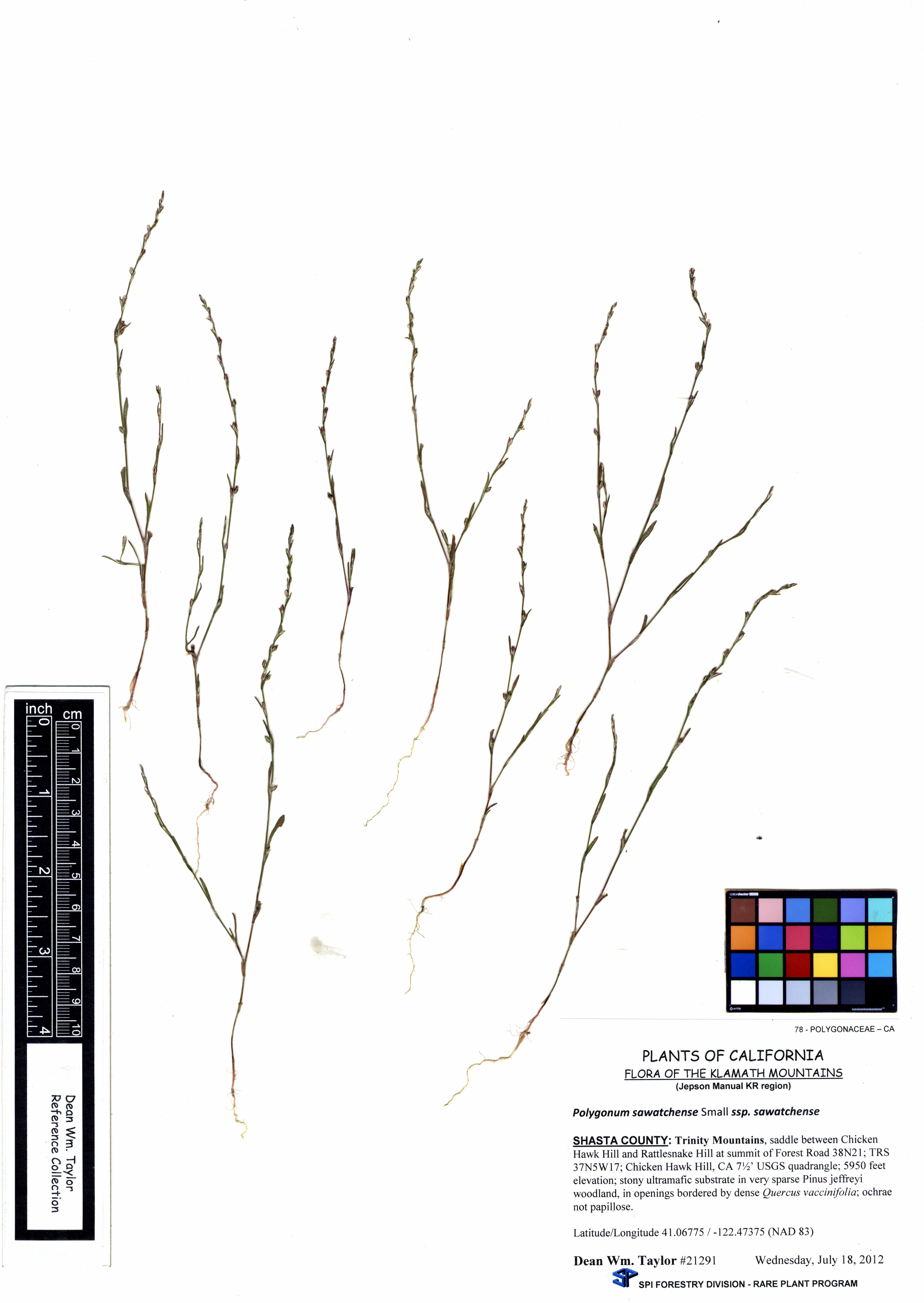

Scientific classification
- Kingdom: Plantae
- Clade: Tracheophytes
- Clade: Angiosperms
- Clade: Eudicots
- Order: Caryophyllales
- Family: Polygonaceae
- Genus: Polygonum
- Species: P. sawatchense

Binomial name
- Polygonum sawatchense Small 1893

Synonyms
- Polygonum douglasii subsp. johnstonii (Munz) J.C.Hickman; Polygonum douglasii var. johnstonii Munz

= Polygonum sawatchense =

Species of flowering plant

Polygonum sawatchense is a North American species of plants in the buckwheat family. It in the western United States and western Canada, from the Pacific Coast to the western Great Plains, so from British Columbia south to California and east as far as New Mexico, Colorado, Saskatchewan, and the Dakotas.

Polygonum sawatchense is a branching, hairless herb up to 50 cm (20 in) tall. Leaves are narrow, up to 45 mm (1.8 in) long. Flowers are green, red, or white, in elongated arrays.

Species is named for the Sawatch Range in Colorado, where Brandegee collected the type specimen.>

Subspecies

- Polygonum sawatchense subsp. oblivium Costea & Tardif - British Columbia, Washington, Oregon, California, Idaho, Nevada
- Polygonum sawatchense subsp. sawatchense - from Alberta + Saskatchewan south to Arizona + New Mexico
