= Polygonum undulatum =

Scientific classification
- Kingdom: Plantae
- Clade: Embryophytes
- Clade: Tracheophytes
- Clade: Spermatophytes
- Clade: Angiosperms
- Clade: Eudicots
- Order: Caryophyllales
- Family: Polygonaceae
- Genus: Polygonum
- Species: P. undulatum

Binomial name
- Polygonum undulatum (L.) P.J.Bergius

Synonyms
- Atraphaxis inermis Mill.; Atraphaxis undulata L.; Polygonum atraphaxoides Thunb.

Species of flowering plant

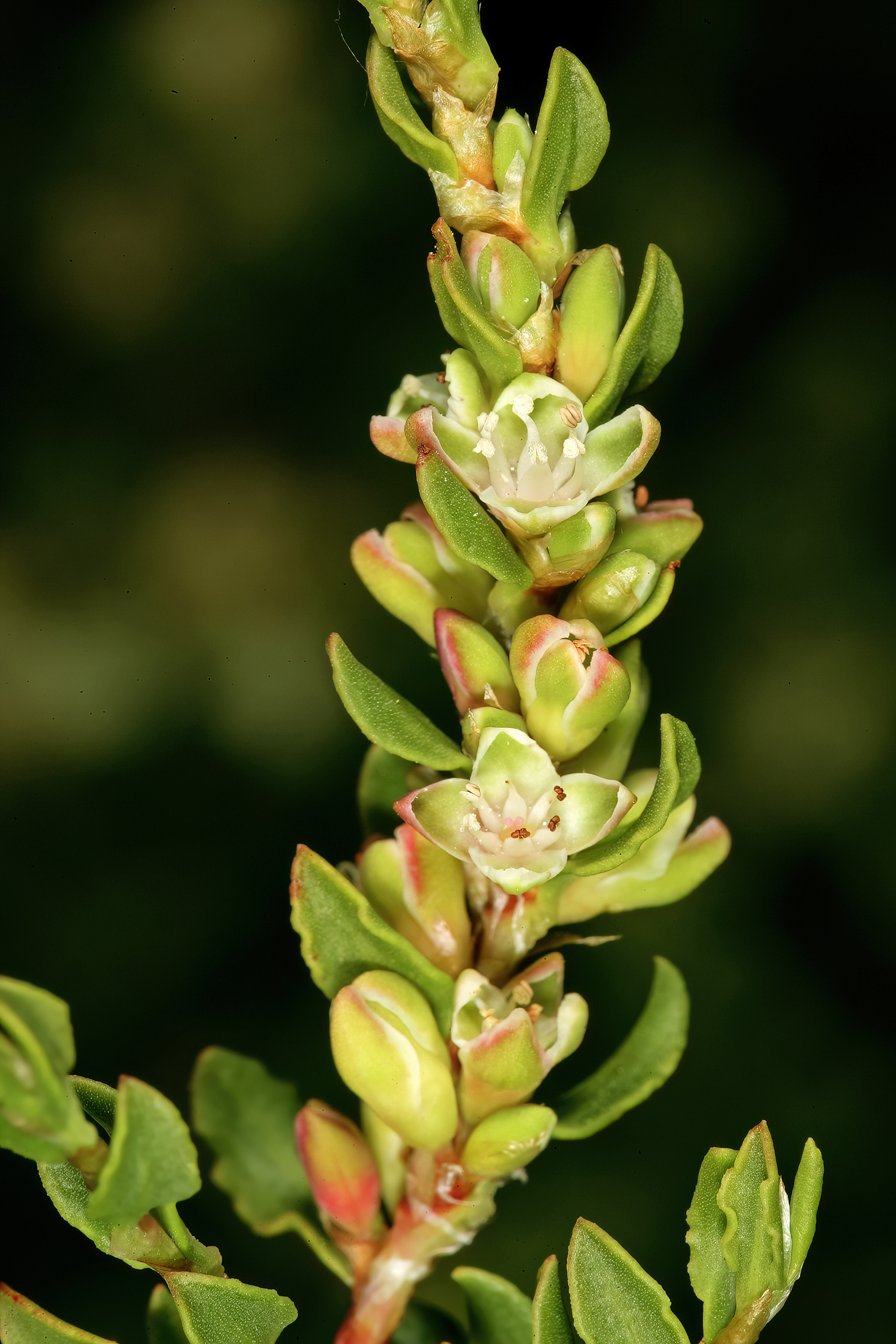
Polygonum undulatum flowers at the Kirstenbosch National Botanical Garden, Cape Town, South Africa

Polygonum undulatum is a species of flowering plant in the family Polygonaceae, native to the Cape Provinces of South Africa. It was first described by Carl Linnaeus in 1753 as Atraphaxis undulata, and later transferred to Polygonum by Peter Jonas Bergius.
