= Polygonum corrigioloides =

Scientific classification
- Kingdom: Plantae
- Clade: Tracheophytes
- Clade: Angiosperms
- Clade: Eudicots
- Order: Caryophyllales
- Family: Polygonaceae
- Genus: Polygonum
- Species: P. corrigioloides

Binomial name
- Polygonum corrigioloides Jaub. & Spach

Synonyms
- Polygonum myrianthum Boiss.

Species of plant

Polygonum corrigioloides, the Euphrates knotgrass, is a species of flowering plant in the family Polygonaceae. It is native to northern Yemen, eastern Syria, Iraq, Iran, the Transcaucasus, Central Asia, Pakistan, and Afghanistan. An annual or perennial, it is typically found on riverbanks. Its nutlets are edible and archeological evidence suggests that they were heavily relied upon by local peoples during the Younger Dryas.
