= Polygonum engelmannii =

Scientific classification
- Kingdom: Plantae
- Clade: Tracheophytes
- Clade: Angiosperms
- Clade: Eudicots
- Order: Caryophyllales
- Family: Polygonaceae
- Genus: Polygonum
- Species: P. engelmannii

Binomial name
- Polygonum engelmannii Greene 1885

Synonyms
- Polygonum douglasii subsp. engelmannii (Greene) Kartesz & Gandhi

Species of flowering plant

Polygonum engelmannii, common name Engelmann's knotweed, is a North American species of plants in the buckwheat family. It is native to western Canada and the western United States, usually at high elevations in the mountains. It has been found in Alberta, British Columbia, Idaho, Montana, Wyoming, Nevada, Utah, and Colorado.

Polygonum engelmannii is an branching herb up to 30 cm (1 foot) tall. It has clusters of green or purple flowers.
