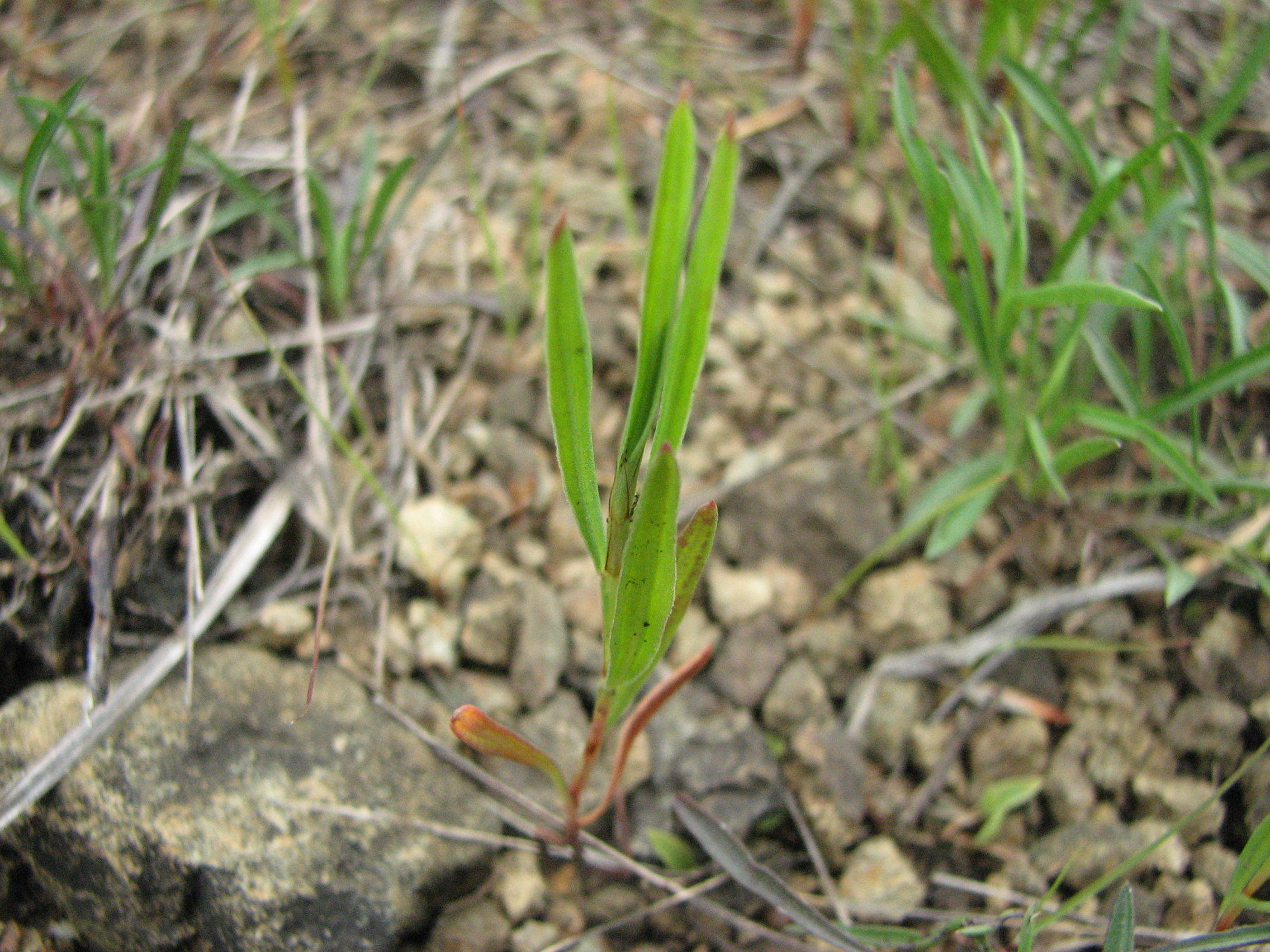

Scientific classification
- Kingdom: Plantae
- Clade: Tracheophytes
- Clade: Angiosperms
- Clade: Eudicots
- Order: Caryophyllales
- Family: Polygonaceae
- Genus: Polygonum
- Species: P. tenue

Binomial name
- Polygonum tenue Michx.

= Polygonum tenue =

Species of flowering plant

Polygonum tenue, the slender knotweed or pleat-leaf knotweed, is a North American species of plant in the buckwheat family. It is widespread across south-central Canada (Ontario) and the eastern and central United States from Maine to Georgia, west as far as Minnesota, South Dakota, Nebraska, and Texas (though apparently now extirpated from Maine and New Hampshire).

Polygonum tenue is a herb up to 50 cm (20 in) tall. Stems are green or brown, not wiry. Leaves are narrow, up to 4 cm (1.6 in) long. Flowers are pink or white.
