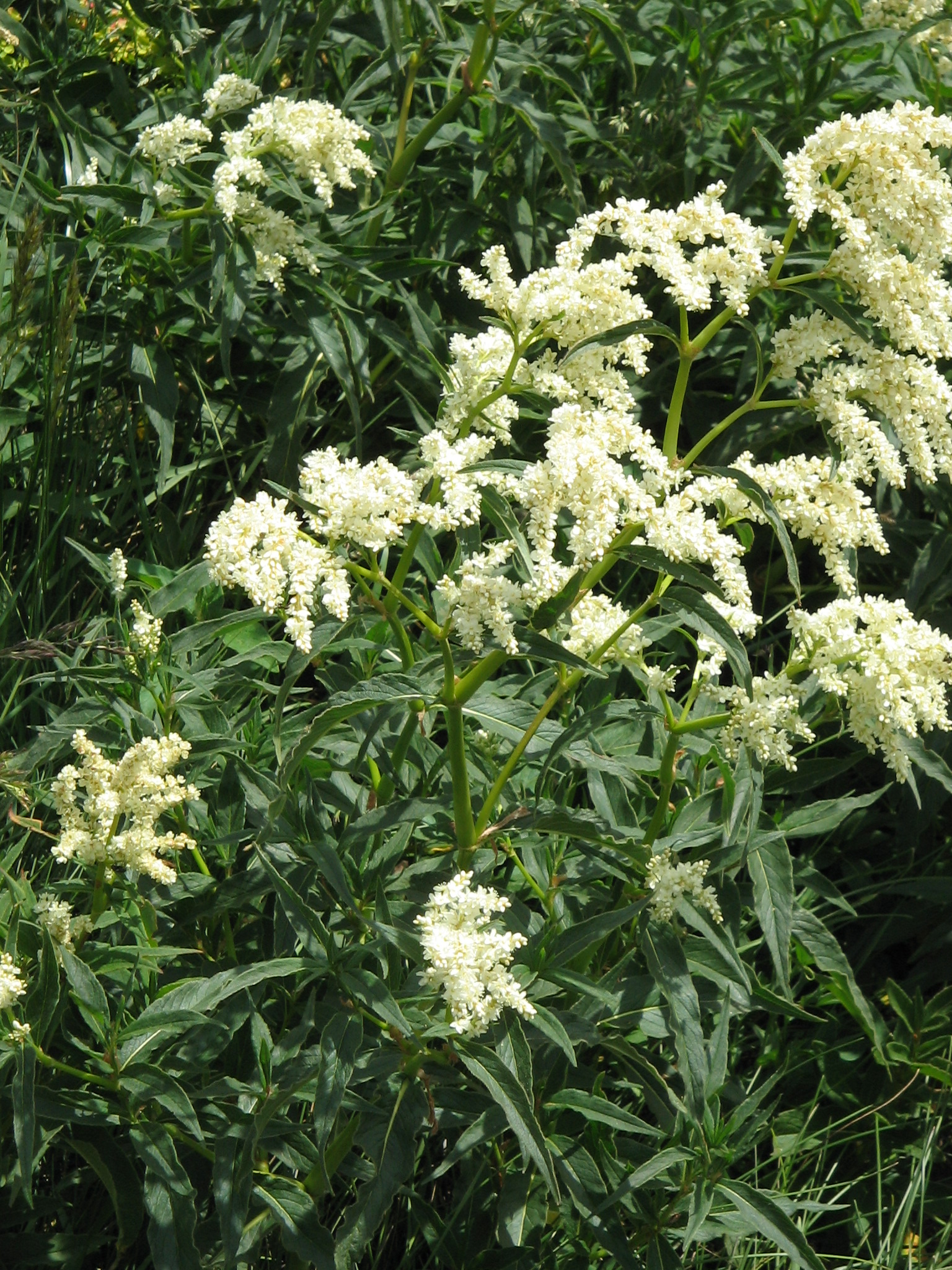

Scientific classification
- Kingdom: Plantae
- Clade: Tracheophytes
- Clade: Angiosperms
- Clade: Eudicots
- Order: Caryophyllales
- Family: Polygonaceae
- Genus: Koenigia
- Species: K. alpina

Binomial name
- Koenigia alpina (All.) T.M.Schust. & Reveal

Synonyms
- Aconogonon alpinum (All.) Schur; Aconogonon alpinum var. elephantinum Stepanov; Aconogonon diffusum (Pall. ex Spreng.) Tzvelev; Aconogonon dshawachischwilii (Kharkev.) Soják; Aconogonon jeholense (Kitag.) H.Hara; Aconogonon polymorphum (Ledeb.) Nakai; Gononcus undulatus Raf.; Persicaria alpina (All.) H.Gross; Persicaria dshawachischwilii (Kharkev.) Cubey; Persicaria undulata (Raf.) H.Gross; Pleuropteropyrum jeholense Kitag.; Pleuropteropyrum undulatum (Raf.) Á.Löve & D.Löve; Polygonum alpinum All.; Polygonum diffusum Pall. ex Spreng.; Polygonum dshawachischwilii Kharkev.; Polygonum polymorphum Ledeb.

= Koenigia alpina =

Species of flowering plant

Koenigia alpina (synonym Aconogonon alpinum), commonly known as alpine knotweed, is similar to Koenigia alaskana, but differs in leaf size and achene characteristics. It is native to Europe and temperate Asia.

It is one of the parents of the cultivated hybrid Koenigia × fennica, the other being Koenigia weyrichii.
