= Polygonum paniculatum =

Polygonum paniculatum is a taxonomic name that is the botanical synonym of two species of plant:

- Koenigia mollis var. paniculata, synonym Polygonum paniculatum Blume published in 1826 by Carl Ludwig Blume (1796–1862)
- Persicaria lapathifolia, synonym Polygonum paniculatum Andrz. published in 1862 by Antoni Lukianowicz Andrzejowski (1785–1868)
