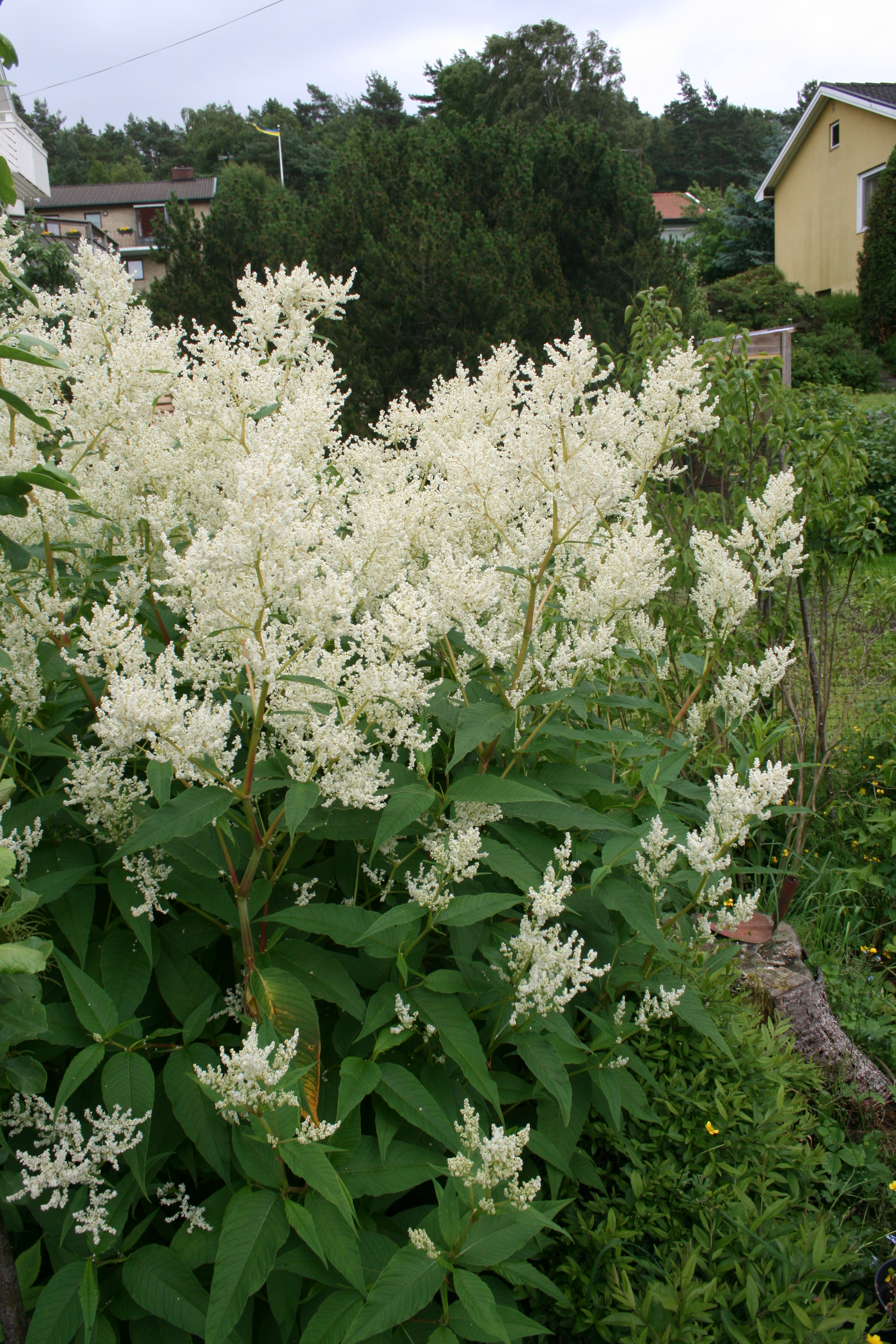

Scientific classification
- Kingdom: Plantae
- Clade: Embryophytes
- Clade: Tracheophytes
- Clade: Spermatophytes
- Clade: Angiosperms
- Clade: Eudicots
- Order: Caryophyllales
- Family: Polygonaceae
- Subfamily: Polygonoideae
- Genus: Koenigia
- Species: K. × fennica

Binomial name
- Koenigia × fennica (Reiersen) T.M.Schust. & Reveal

Synonyms
- Aconogonon × fennicum Reiersen; Persicaria × fennica (Reiersen) Stace; Polygonum × fennicum (Reiersen) S.R.Majorov

= Koenigia × fennica =

Species of flowering plant

Koenigia × fennica, known as Finnish knotweed, is a hybrid between two species of Koenigia, K. alpina and K. weyrichii, members of the family Polygonaceae, the knotweed family. It generally only known as a cultivated garden plant, but plants have been recorded a few times surviving in abandoned areas in northern Europe, especially in Finland. The cultivar 'Johanniswolke' is considered an attractive ornamental perennial plant.

== Description ==
Like the other species of the former genus Aconogonon (all now classified in Koenigia), the hybrid is a perennial, growing from short rhizomes. It grows to about 1.5 m (5 ft), with leaves up at least 10 cm (4 in) long and about 4.5 cm (1.8 in) wide. The hybrid is intermediate in appearance between its parents. It differs from Koenigia weyrichii in having less persistent ochreas (sheaths surrounding the stems), less pointed leaves with fewer hairs on the underside, pedicels that are jointed in the upper part, and larger tepals. It has broader leaves than Koenigia alpina, with a width at least 40% of the length. It usually does not produce fertile seed.

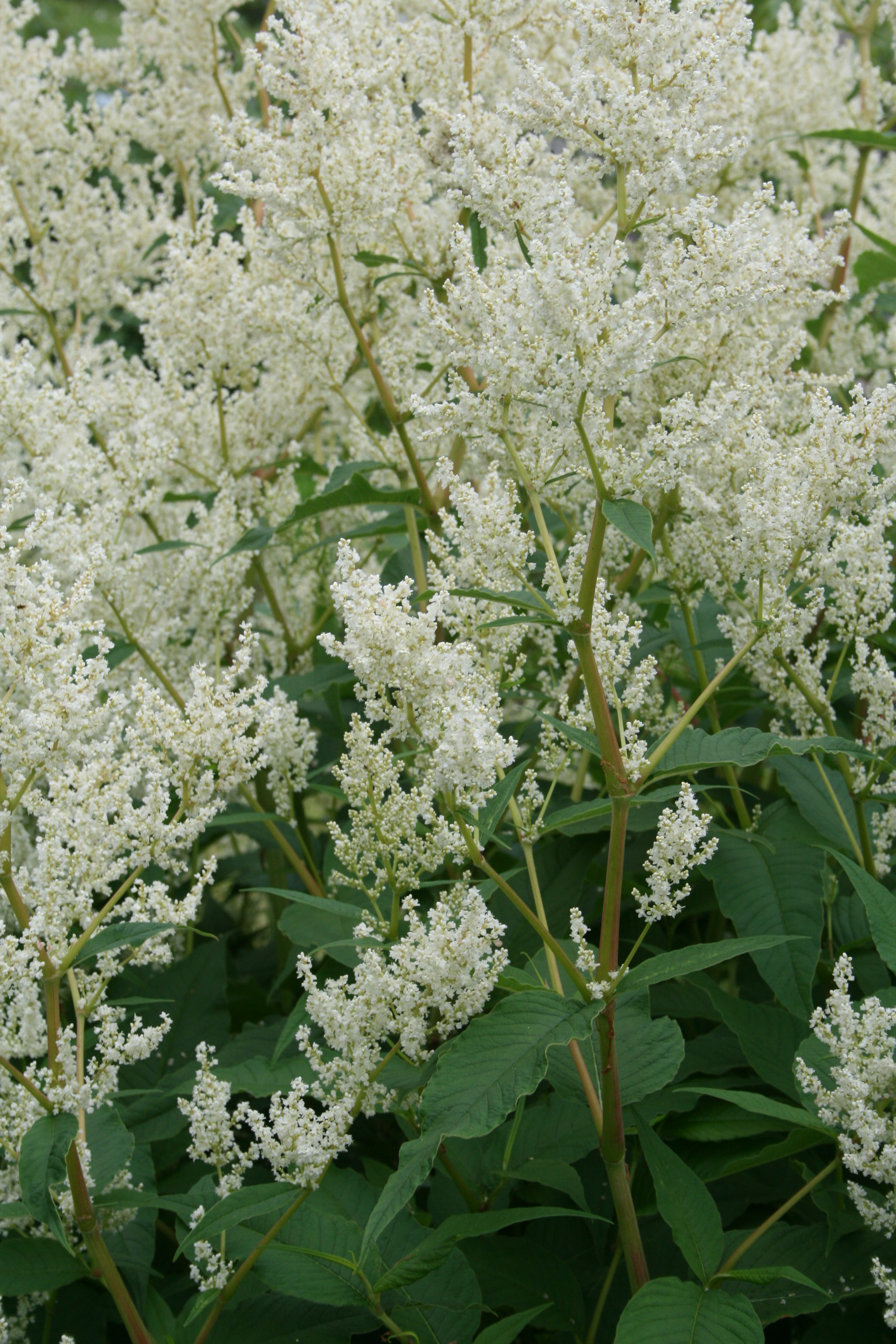
Inflorescence

The hybrid may have arisen a number of times in Europe. Reiersen, who had studied the taxon since the late 1980s, noted in 2000 that Danish plants had hairier leaves than the other Scandinavian plants, and that Danish plants produced fertile pollen and differed in other small aspects of the floral morphology. There were three plants known in Britain until the 2000s, two of them cultivated in botanical gardens, these differed from each other, and from the Scandinavian collections, with the plant from Yorkshire producing fertile seed.

== Taxonomy ==
Scandinavian plants of Koenigia × fennica had originally been identified as K. mollis in Nordic floras, but in 1999 Reiersen described them as a new hybrid, Aconogonon × fennicum, both purported parents (now Koenigia alpina and K. weyrichii) then being placed in the genus Aconogonon. Clive A. Stace, who in the 1997 edition of the New Flora of the British Isles had classified the three known British plants as a variant of Persicaria alpina, promptly moved the taxon to P. × fennica in 2002, believing Aconogonon to be invalid as a genus. Aconogonon has since been subsumed into Koenigia. The genus Koenigia is placed in the tribe Persicarieae, whose taxonomic history has been described as "exceptionally convoluted, even by Polygonaceae standards". The generic boundaries within the tribe have varied considerably; Koenigia × fennica has also been placed in Persicaria and Polygonum.

The orthographical variant Aconogonum is used by some sources.

== Distribution ==
It was widespread in cultivation in Nordic countries, especially Finland, when first described in 1999. The first plants appeared in the 1970s in Finland. Reiersen in 2000 recorded over 100 instances of it being found in Finland, a dozen or so each in Norway and Denmark, and twice in Sweden. By 2018 it had been found 514 times in Finland. It is recorded as a "new resident alien" in the 2019 Checklist of the Vascular Plants of Finland, and "spreading in the wild". It has only been found once as a garden escape in Britain, a plant found in 1981 in Yorkshire. In Belgium it has been sighted twice as a garden escape on abandoned grounds, both in 2014.

== Horticulture ==
The cultivar 'Johanniswolke' first appeared in Germany in the early 2000s as Aconogonon 'Johanniswolke', supposedly as a collection from Asia. It is often classified as "A. speciosum" in horticulture. Around the same time the hybrid was also being sold elsewhere in Europe under the name "Polygonum polymorphum" or "Persicaria polymorpha", and different other combinations of these names now exist in horticulture. Neither P. polymorpha nor Aconogonon speciosum exist as valid taxonomic names, these are horticultural inventions, whereas Polygonum polymorphum is a synonym of the related Koenigia alpina. The plant has been called "white dragon knotweed" in the USA.

This plant is grown as an ornamental perennial. It grows to a height of 150–200 cm (4 ft 11 in – 6 ft 7 in). Flowering in June, or July to August in far northern latitudes, it has creamy white flowers which turn pink as they age. Although shrub-like in appearance, it is herbaceous, dying back to the ground over winter. It has been described as "very good value for almost instant impact" and an "eye-catcher", although some people find the flower scent to be unpleasant.

In Finland the hybrid can even be grown in gardens in the north of the country. It is recommended for use as a hedge in climates where the weight of excessive snowfall destroys hedges made of shrubs.

The cultivar 'Johanniswolke' is supposed to be somewhat smaller than the nominate form, although it grows just as tall as the plants circulating under the name P. polymorpha. It is furthermore said to be sterile, flowers which become dark pink after anthesis, and to have non-invasive rhizomes which stay short and compact. P. polymorpha is said to sometimes send up a shoot less than a meter from the main clump after many years, have a rhizome which is able to grow 50 cm downward to escape a barrier, and to rarely produce black berries.
