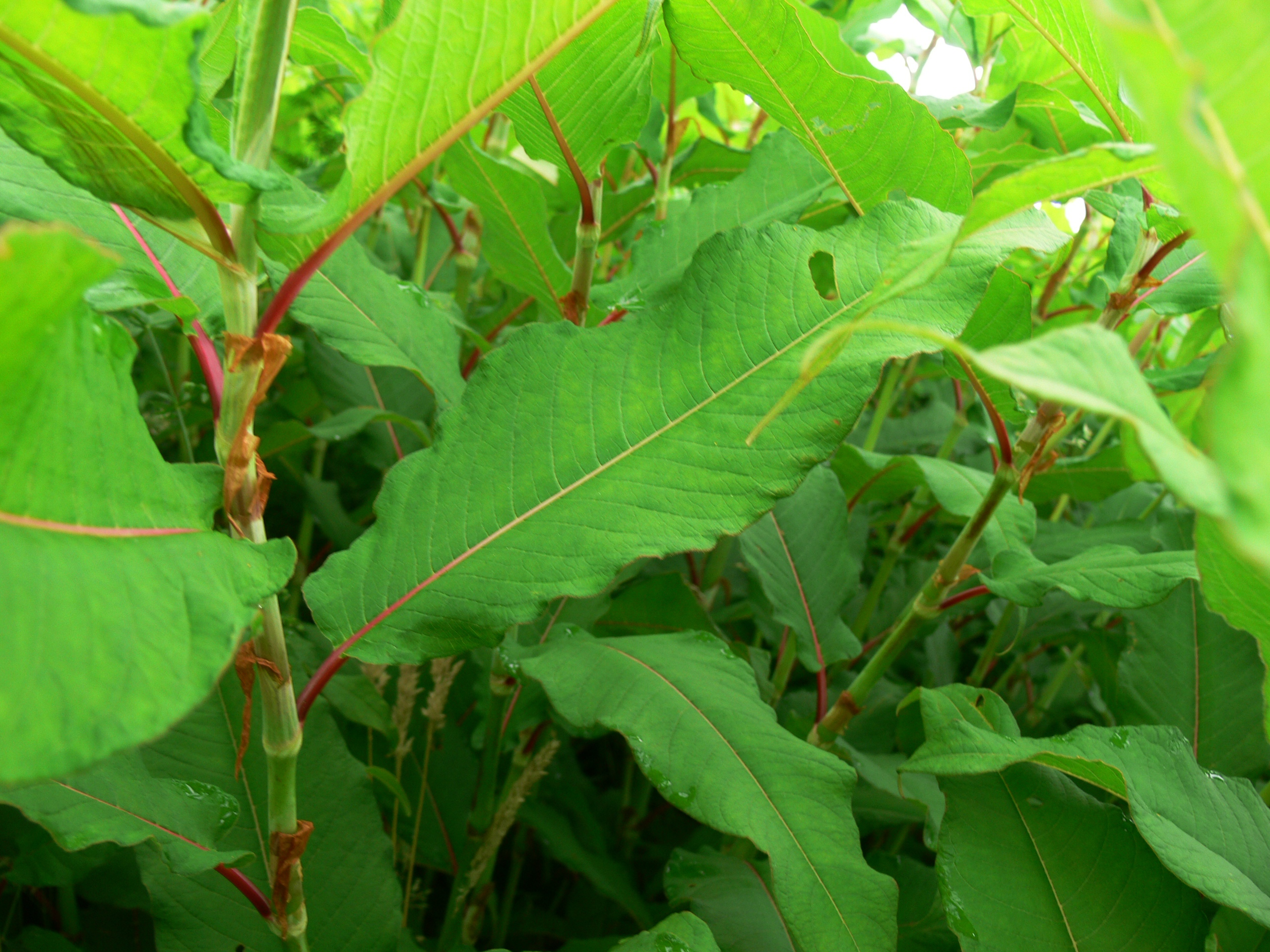

Scientific classification
- Kingdom: Plantae
- Clade: Embryophytes
- Clade: Tracheophytes
- Clade: Spermatophytes
- Clade: Angiosperms
- Clade: Eudicots
- Order: Caryophyllales
- Family: Polygonaceae
- Genus: Koenigia
- Species: K. polystachya

Binomial name
- Koenigia polystachya (Wall. ex Meisn.) T.M.Schust. & Reveal

Synonyms
- Aconogonon polystachyum (Wall. ex Meisn.) M.Král; Persicaria wallichii Greuter & Burdet; Peutalis polystachya (Wall. ex Meisn.) Raf.; Pleuropteropyrum polystachyum (Wall. ex Meisn.) Munshi & Javeid; Polygonum polystachyum Wall. ex Meisn.; Reynoutria polystachya (Wall. ex Meisn.) Moldenke; Rubrivena polystachya (Wall. ex Meisn.) M.Král

= Koenigia polystachya =

Species of flowering plant

Koenigia polystachya is a species of flowering plant in the knotweed family, known by the common names Himalayan knotweed and cultivated knotweed. It has several regularly used synonyms, including Polygonum polystachyum, Aconogonon polystachyum and Persicaria wallichii.

== Distribution ==
Koenigia polystachya is native to Asia (southwestern China, Indian Subcontinent, Myanmar, Afghanistan) and it is planted many places as an ornamental. It has the capacity to become an invasive species and has established itself in some parts of North America, primarily the Pacific Coast of the United States and Canada. It is an invasive weed in the mountains of Sri Lanka. The species has also been introduced into Europe, where it is included in the list of invasive alien species of Union concern and hence cannot be imported, bred, transported, commercialized, or intentionally released into the environment in any of the member states of the European Union.

== Description ==
Koenigia polystachya is a rhizomatous perennial herb producing thick, hollow, erect stems easily exceeding one meter (40 inches) in length. Via its rhizomes it can form dense colonies. It may also spread asexually if sections of the stem containing rooting nodes are separated and moved to a new area; chopping the plant into small pieces does not necessarily keep it from growing. The hairy leaves are up to 20 centimeters (8 inches) long. The branching inflorescence is an array of lacy clusters of many small white flowers.

Called thothnay in Sikkim and Darjeeling areas of India, the pleasantly sour-tasting edible shoots and stems are used as vegetable or used to make piquant condiments and accompaniments for meals.
