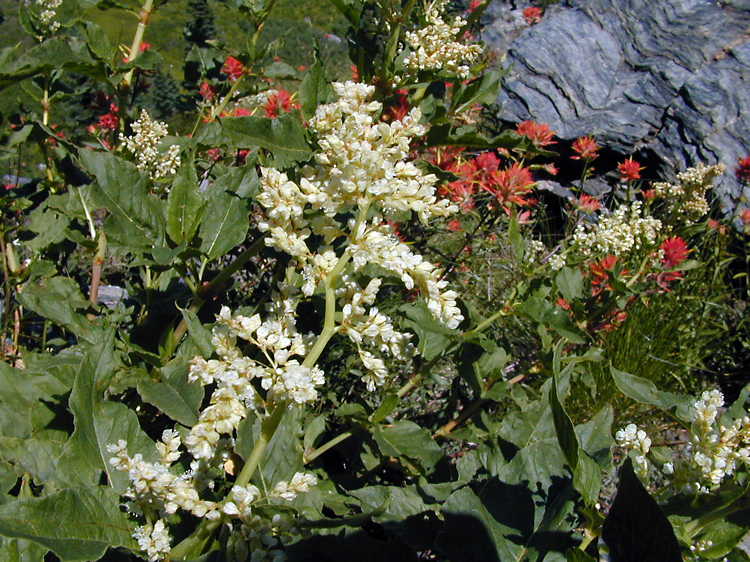
- Koenigia phytolaccifolia

Scientific classification
- Kingdom: Plantae
- Clade: Embryophytes
- Clade: Tracheophytes
- Clade: Angiosperms
- Clade: Eudicots
- Order: Caryophyllales
- Family: Polygonaceae
- Subfamily: Polygonoideae
- Genus: Koenigia; L.

Species
- See text.

Synonyms
- Aconogonon (Meisn.) Rchb.; Macounastrum Small; Pleuropteropyrum H.Gross; Rubrivena M.Král

= Koenigia =

Genus of flowering plants in the knotweed family

Koenigia as described by Philibert Commerçon is a synonym of Dombeya.

Koenigia is a genus of plants in the family Polygonaceae. The genus Aconogonon has been merged into Koenigia.

== Description ==
Species of Koenigia are annual or perennial herbaceous plants, growing from taproots. The flowers are arranged in terminal or axillary inflorescences. The flowers have pale tepals: white, greenish to yellowish white or pink. The seeds are borne in achenes that are usually brown or black in colour and not winged.

== Taxonomy ==
The genus Koenigia was erected by Carl Linnaeus in 1767, initially for the type species Koenigia islandica. The boundaries between genera in the family Polygonaceae, and the relationships among them, have long been a problem. At one time, many species were placed in the genus Polygonum. Koenigia is placed in the subfamily Polygonoideae, tribe Persicarieae, whose taxonomic history has been described as "exceptionally convoluted, even by Polygonaceae standards".

A molecular phylogenetic study of the subfamily Polygonoideae in 2015 showed that the genus Koenigia was polyphyletic with respect to the genus Aconogonon. An earlier study had reached a similar conclusion, and had suggested that extra genera be created to maintain monophyletic taxa. The authors of the 2015 study preferred the alternative of merging the two genera, a proposal accepted by other sources. Using broad circumscriptions of the genera, the 2015 study suggested that relationships within the tribe Persicarieae were:

- Persicarieae
  - Persicaria (comprising sections Echinocaulon, Tovara and Cephalophilon)
  - - Bistorta
    - Koenigia (including Aconogonon)

=== Species ===
As of February 2019, Plants of the World Online accepted the following species:

- Koenigia alaskana (Small) T.M.Schust. & Reveal
- Koenigia alpina (All.) T.M.Schust. & Reveal
- Koenigia bingchachaensis Xu, B (2026)
- Koenigia campanulata (Hook.f.) T.M.Schust. & Reveal
- Koenigia cathayana (A.J.Li) T.M.Schust. & Reveal
- Koenigia chuanzangensis Z.Z.Zhou & Y.J.Min
- Koenigia coriaria (Grig.) T.M.Schust. & Reveal
- Koenigia cyanandra (Diels) Mesícek & Soják
- Koenigia davisiae (W.H.Brewer ex A.Gray) T.M.Schust. & Reveal
- Koenigia delicatula (Meisn.) H.Hara
- Koenigia divaricata (L.) T.M.Schust. & Reveal
- Koenigia × fennica f(Reiersen) T.M.Schust. & Reveal
- Koenigia fertilis Maxim.
- Koenigia filicaulis (Wall. ex Meisn.) T.M.Schust. & Reveal
- Koenigia forrestii (Diels) Mesícek & Soják
- Koenigia hedbergii Bo Li & W.Du
- Koenigia hookeri (Meisn.) T.M.Schust. & Reveal
- Koenigia islandica L.
- Koenigia jurii (A.K.Skvortsov) T.M.Schust. & Reveal
- Koenigia lichiangensis (W.W.Sm.) T.M.Schust. & Reveal
- Koenigia limosa (Kom.) T.M.Schust. & Reveal
- Koenigia mollis (D.Don) T.M.Schust. & Reveal
- Koenigia nepalensis D.Don
- Koenigia nummularifolia (Meisn.) Mesícek & Soják
- Koenigia ocreata (L.) T.M.Schust. & Reveal
- Koenigia panjutinii (Kharkev.) T.M.Schust. & Reveal
- Koenigia phytolaccifolia (Meisn. ex Small) T.M.Schust. & Reveal
- Koenigia pilosa Maxim.
- Koenigia polystachya (Wall. ex Meisn.) T.M.Schust. & Reveal
- Koenigia relicta (Kom.) T.M.Schust. & Reveal
- Koenigia rumicifolia (Royle ex Bab.) T.M.Schust. & Reveal
- Koenigia songarica (Schrenk) T.M.Schust. & Reveal
- Koenigia tortuosa (D.Don) T.M.Schust. & Reveal
- Koenigia tripterocarpa (A.Gray) T.M.Schust. & Reveal
- Koenigia weyrichii (F.Schmidt) T.M.Schust. & Reveal
- Koenigia yatagaiana (T.Mori) T.C.Hsu & S.W.Chung

== Distribution and habitat ==
Koenigia species are found in meadows, along stream banks, or on rocky slopes in arctic, temperate and alpine regions of the Northern Hemisphere.
