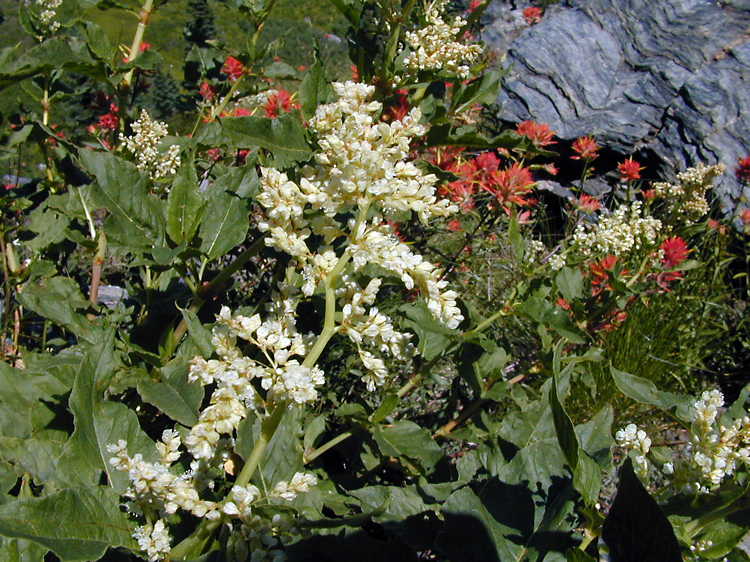

Scientific classification
- Kingdom: Plantae
- Clade: Tracheophytes
- Clade: Angiosperms
- Clade: Eudicots
- Order: Caryophyllales
- Family: Polygonaceae
- Genus: Koenigia
- Species: K. phytolaccifolia

Binomial name
- Koenigia phytolaccifolia (Meisn. ex Small) Rydb. T.M.Schust. & Reveal

Synonyms
- Aconogonon phytolaccifolium (Meisn. ex Small) Small; Aconogonon smallii (Kongar) Soják; Polygonum phytolaccifolium Meisn. ex Small; Polygonum smallii Kongar

= Koenigia phytolaccifolia =

Species of flowering plant

Koenigia phytolaccifolia (synonym Aconogonon phytolaccifolium) is a species of flowering plant in the knotweed family, known by the common name poke knotweed.

== Description ==
Koenigia phytolaccifolia is a perennial herb up to 200 cm (79 in) tall. The lance-shaped or pointed oval leaves are 10 to 20 centimeters long and borne on petioles. The leaves have large stipules which form reddish ochrea up to 3 centimetres (1.2 inches) long. The inflorescence is a long array of branching cluster of many white or greenish flowers. Each flower is about 4 millimetres (0.16 inches) wide and has tiny protruding stamens tipped with yellow or pink anthers.

== Distribution ==
Koenigia phytolaccifolia is native to the western United States: California, Oregon, Washington, Nevada, Idaho, and Montana.
