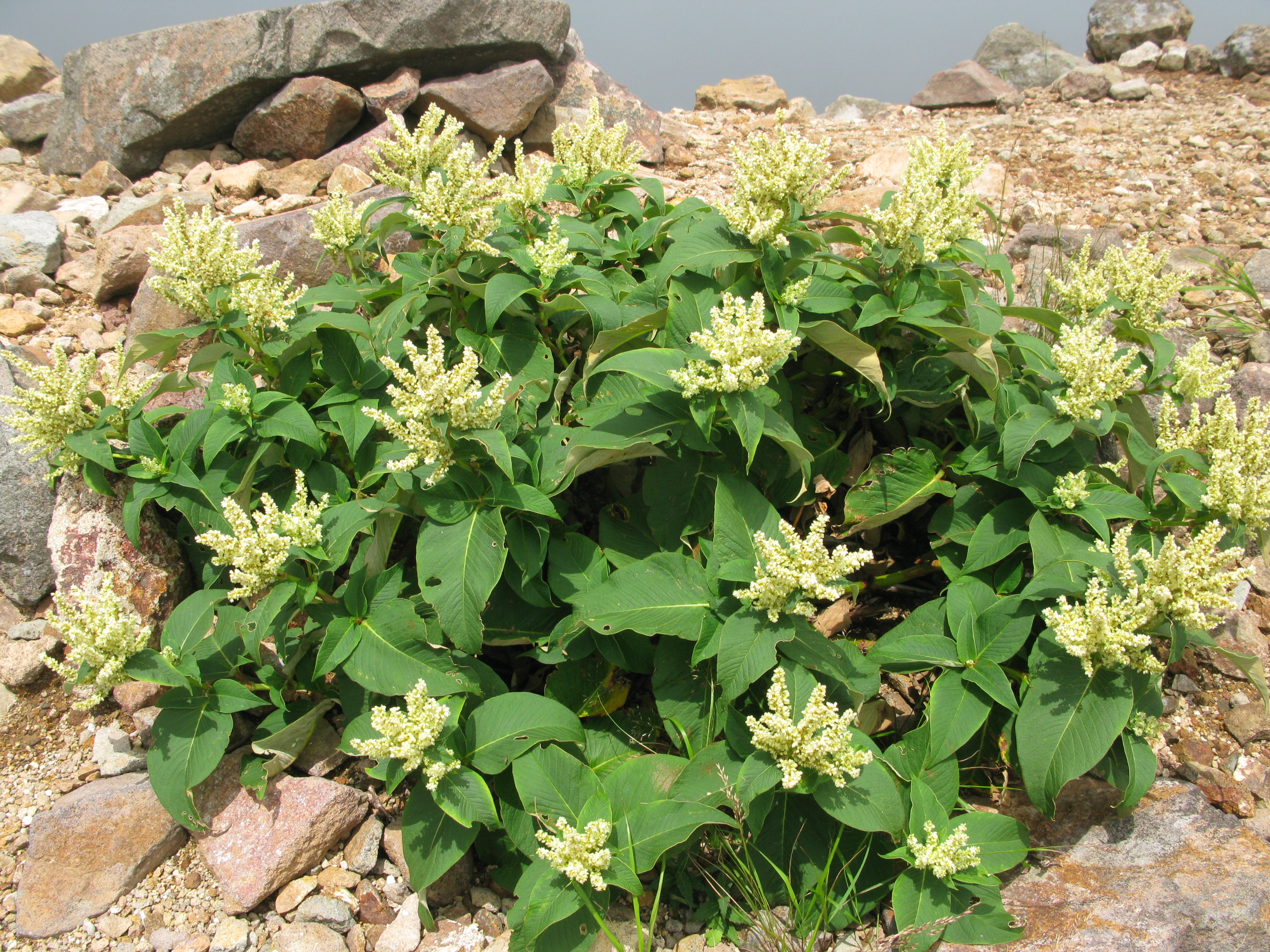
- Koenigia weyrichii on Mount Nasu, Tochigi prefecture, Japan

Scientific classification
- Kingdom: Plantae
- Clade: Tracheophytes
- Clade: Angiosperms
- Clade: Eudicots
- Order: Caryophyllales
- Family: Polygonaceae
- Genus: Koenigia
- Species: K. weyrichii

Binomial name
- Koenigia weyrichii (F.Schmidt) T.M.Schust. & Reveal

Synonyms
- Aconogonon pseudoajanense Barkalov & Vyschin; Aconogonon savatieri (Nakai) Tzvelev; Aconogonon savatieri var. iturupense (Mishurov) Tzvelev; Aconogonon weyrichii (F.Schmidt) H.Hara; Aconogonon weyrichii subsp. savatieri (Nakai) Tzvelev; Persicaria weyrichii (F.Schmidt) H.Gross; Pleuropteropyrum iturupense (Mishurov) Soják; Pleuropteropyrum savatieri (Nakai) Koidz. ex Nakai; Pleuropteropyrum weyrichii (F.Schmidt) H.Gross; Polygonum iturupense Mishurov; Polygonum weyrichii F.Schmidt; Reynoutria weyrichii (F.Schmidt) Moldenke

= Koenigia weyrichii =

Species of flowering plant

Koenigia weyrichii (synonym Persicaria weyrichii), the Chinese knotweed or Weyrich's knotweed, is a large, perennial, rhizomatous herb native to northeastern Asia in Kamchatka, Sakhalin, and northern and central Japan. It is also locally naturalised in northern Europe.

It is one of the parents of the cultivated hybrid Koenigia × fennica, the other being Koenigia alpina.
