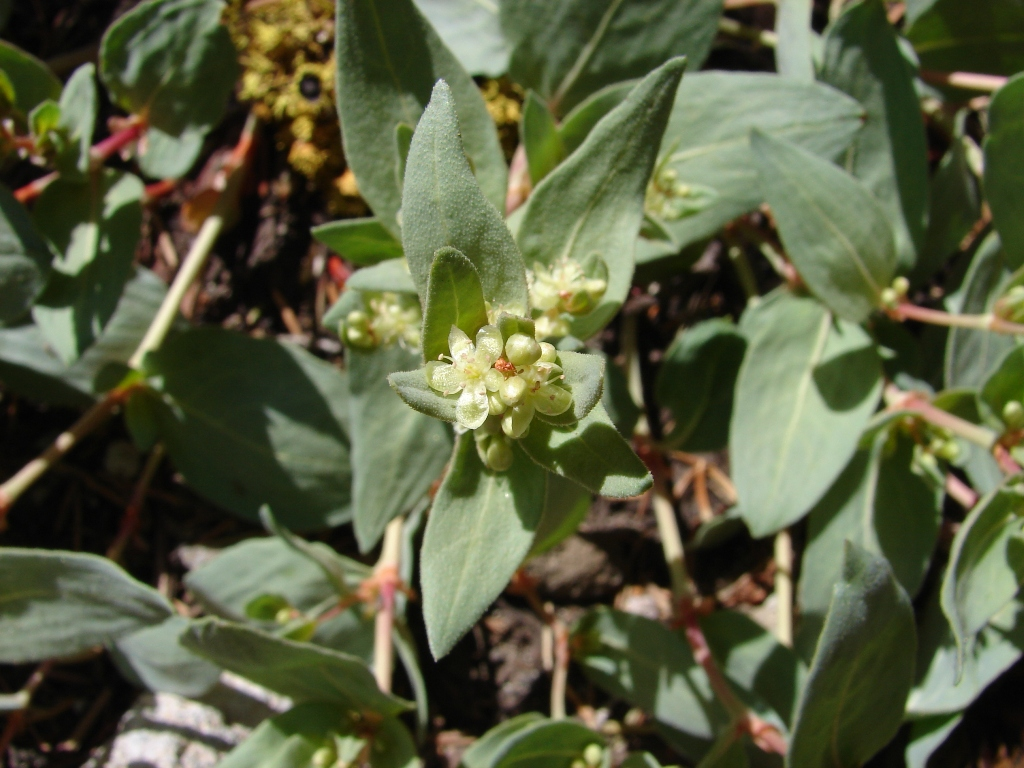

Scientific classification
- Kingdom: Plantae
- Clade: Tracheophytes
- Clade: Angiosperms
- Clade: Eudicots
- Order: Caryophyllales
- Family: Polygonaceae
- Genus: Koenigia
- Species: K. davisiae

Binomial name
- Koenigia davisiae (W.H.Brewer ex A.Gray) T.M.Schust. & Reveal

Synonyms
- Aconogonon davisiae (W.H.Brewer ex A.Gray) Soják; Aconogonon davisiae var. glabrum (G.N.Jones) S.P.Hong; Aconogonon newberryi (Small) Soják; Polygonum davisiae W.H.Brewer ex A.Gray; Polygonum newberryi Small; Polygonum newberryi var. glabrum G.N.Jones

= Koenigia davisiae =

Species of flowering plant

Koenigia davisiae is a flowering plant in the knotweed family that is known by the common names Davis' knotweed or Newberry knotweed.

== Distribution ==
Koenigia davisiae is native to the western United States from Washington, Oregon, and central and northern California (northern Coast Ranges and northern Sierra Nevada). There are also isolated populations in central Idaho. It grows in high mountain habitat, such as talus and fellfields.

== Description ==
Koenigia davisiae is a deciduous perennial herb producing a decumbent or upright stem from a woody caudex, growing to a maximum erect height near 40 centimeters (3 feet). Stems may be pale green to red in color. The leaves are oval and pointed or widely-lance-shaped to somewhat triangular, yellowish or pale green and waxy, slightly hairy, or smooth in texture. Leaf edges are entire or minutely toothed. At the base of each leaf is a thin reddish sheath formed from the leaf's stipules which is known as the ochrea. In late summer to autumn, the leaves turn orange to red.

Flowers occur in clusters of 2 to 5 in the leaf axils. The flowers are yellowish, greenish, or purple-tinged and just a few millimeters wide.
