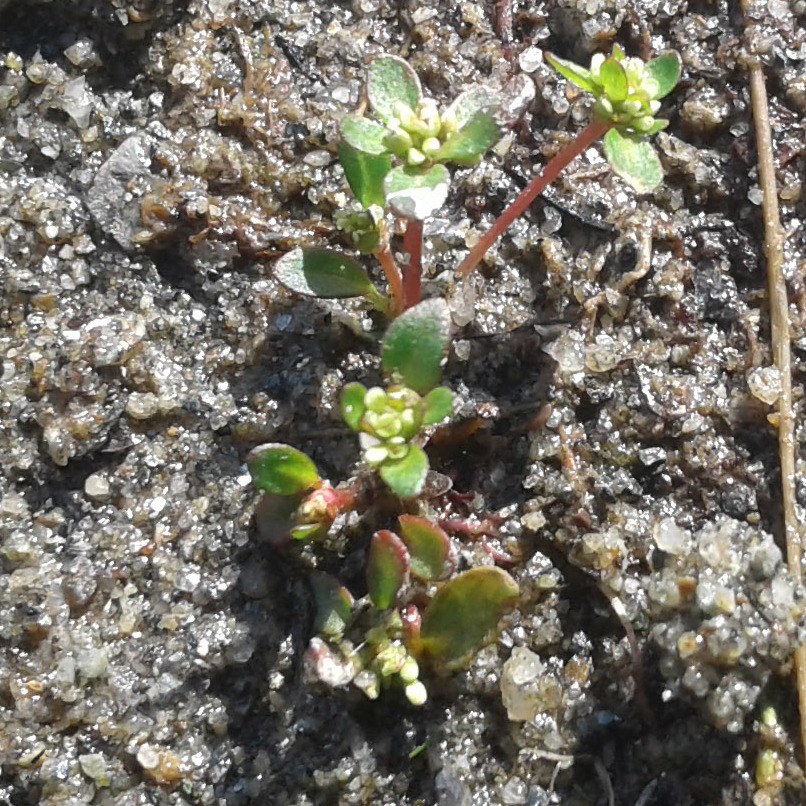

Conservation status
- Apparently Secure (NatureServe)

Scientific classification
- Kingdom: Plantae
- Clade: Tracheophytes
- Clade: Angiosperms
- Clade: Eudicots
- Order: Caryophyllales
- Family: Polygonaceae
- Genus: Koenigia
- Species: K. islandica

Binomial name
- Koenigia islandica L.

Synonyms
- Koenigia fuegiana; Koenigia hadacii; Macounastrum islandicum; Polygonum islandicum

= Koenigia islandica =

Island Knotweed

Plant species in the buckwheat family

Koenigia islandica, the island knotweed, is a species of annual flowering plant in the buckwheat family, Polygonaceae and is the type species of the genus Koenigia. It is a very small plant and is found growing on wet gravel and scree in arctic tundra and alpine meadows.

== Description ==
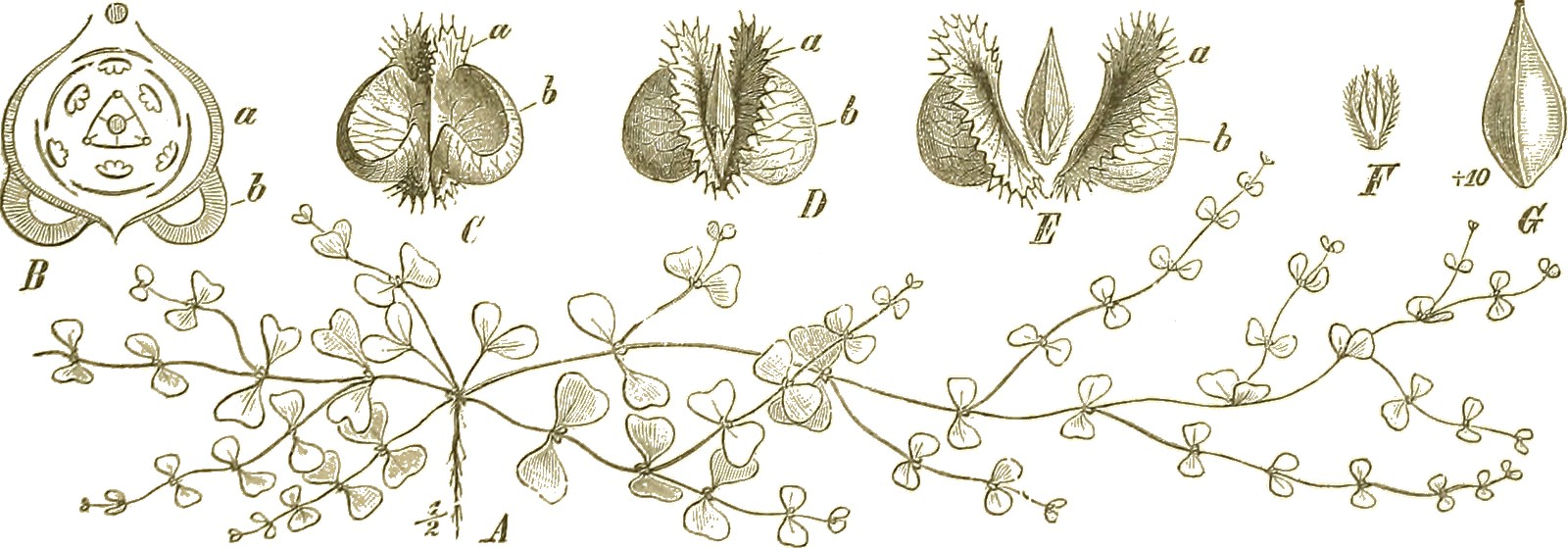

Koenigia islandica is a minute, hairless, annual plant with a slender taproot. It grows to a height of 1 to 2 cm (0.4 to 0.8 in) and is one of the world's smallest plants. It has simple or branched, often reddish, stems which root at the lower nodes. The leaves are in opposite pairs, fused at the base to a short sheath which surrounds the stem; the leaf blades are up to 3 mm (0.12 in) long, obovate, oblong or elliptic, with a blunt tip. The inflorescence is a few-flowered cyme with several bracts. The individual flowers are green, white or pinkish, bisexual, with three tepals, three stamens and three fused carpels. The fruit is a three-sided nut containing a single seed. Flowering occurs during July and August.

== Taxonomy ==
Koenigia islandica was given its scientific name by Carl Linnaeus in 1767. Two proposals to move it to another genus were made, to Polygonum in 1886 by Joseph Dalton Hooker and to Macounastrum in 1896 by John Kunkel Small, but the accepted name places it in Koenigia. Alongside the rest of the genus it is part of the Polygonaceae family and the species has four synonyms.

Table of Synonyms
| Name | Year | Notes |
|---|---|---|
| Koenigia fuegiana Dusén | 1900 | = het. |
| Koenigia hadacii Á.Löve & D.Löve | 1975 | = het. |
| Macounastrum islandicum (L.) Small | 1896 | ≡ hom. |
| Polygonum islandicum (L.) Hook.f. | 1886 | ≡ hom. |
Notes: ≡ homotypic synonym; = heterotypic synonym

== Distribution and habitat ==
Koenigia islandica has a circumboreal arctic/alpine distribution. Its range includes Northern Europe, Central and Northern Asia, North America, Greenland, and Southern Chile and Argentina. It is typically found growing on arctic tundra, on wet scree, on areas of wet gravel, near lakes, pools and streams, on alpine meadows and beside patches of melting snow, at altitudes of up to 4,000 m (13,000 ft). In the United States, it is found in Alaska, Colorado, Montana, Utah and Wyoming. In Britain it is restricted to scattered locations on the Isle of Skye and the Isle of Mull.

== Ecology ==
On the island of Svalbard, Koenigia islandica is found on wet alluvial deposits, lake shores, and bare disturbed areas, growing on the black surface formed by mosses, liverworts and algal crust. It is one of only three annual vascular plants present on the island and the only common one, and with its range extending into the northern arctic tundra zone, it is considered the hardiest annual plant in the world. Its success may be due to it being restricted to wet sites, which moderates the climate, making it warmer in cold weather and cooler in hot dry weather. Even when killed by heat or drought after flowering, the plant may wither and dry up, but the fruits can still produce viable seed. Dispersal of the seeds is by birds and water, and they can remain in the ground for years before germinating when the conditions are suitable.
