= Koenigia campanulata =

Scientific classification
- Kingdom: Plantae
- Clade: Tracheophytes
- Clade: Angiosperms
- Clade: Eudicots
- Order: Caryophyllales
- Family: Polygonaceae
- Genus: Koenigia
- Species: K. campanulata

Binomial name
- Koenigia campanulata (Hook.f.) T.M.Schust. & Reveal

Synonyms
- Aconogonon campanulatum (Hook.f.) H.Hara; Persicaria campanulata (Hook.f.) Ronse Decr.; Polygonum campanulatum Hook.f.; Reynoutria campanulata (Hook.f.) Moldenke

Species of flowering plant

Koenigia campanulata is a species of flowering plant in the family Polygonaceae. It is native to China (Guizhou, west Hubei, Sichuan, Yunnan and Tibet), Bhutan, north Myanmar, Nepal and Sikkim. It has been introduced into south Chile, Great Britain and Ireland.
