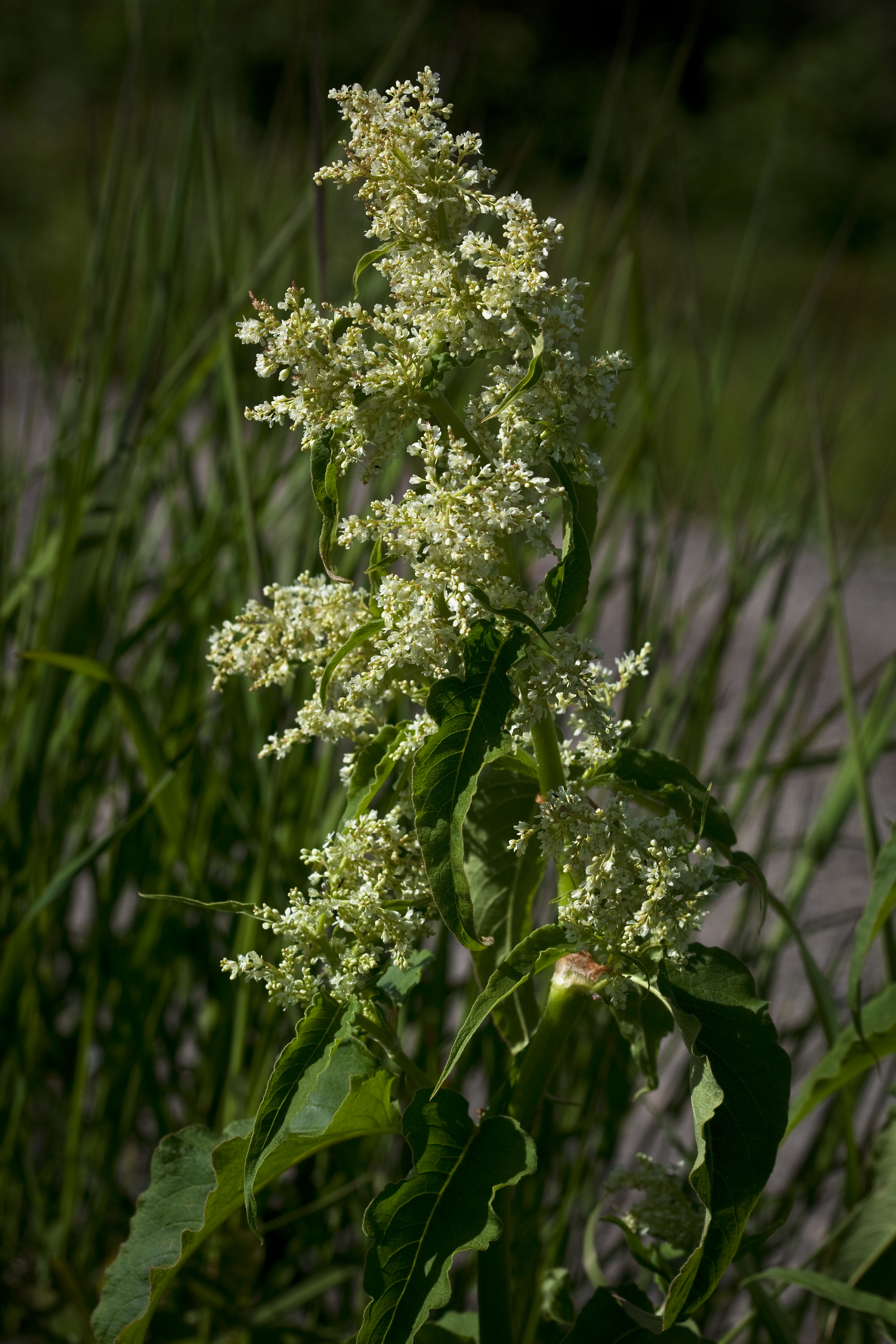

Scientific classification
- Kingdom: Plantae
- Clade: Tracheophytes
- Clade: Angiosperms
- Clade: Eudicots
- Order: Caryophyllales
- Family: Polygonaceae
- Genus: Koenigia
- Species: K. alaskana

Binomial name
- Koenigia alaskana (Small) T.M.Schust. & Reveal

Synonyms
- Aconogonon alaskanum (Small) Soják; Aconogonon hultenianum var. lapathifolium (Cham. & Schltdl.) S.P.Hong; Polygonum alaskanum (Small) W.Wight ex Hultén; Polygonum alpinum subsp. alaskanum (Small) S.L.Welsh; Polygonum alpinum var. lapathifolium Cham. & Schltdl.; Polygonum polymorphum var. lapathifolium (Cham. & Schltdl.) Ledeb.

= Koenigia alaskana =

Species of flowering plant

Koenigia alaskana (synonym Aconogonon alaskanum, Persicaria alpina) is an Asian and North American species of flowering plant in the buckwheat family known by the common names Alaska wild-rhubarb and alpine knotweed.

== Description ==
This herbaceous or semi-evergreen perennial grows up to 2 meters (almost 7 feet) tall, with a woody root and lanceolate leaves. The abundant flowers are white, cream or pale green, borne in plumes in midsummer. They are followed by pinkish seed-heads later in summer or in early autumn. However, in a garden setting they are usually cut back after flowering to preserve vigour.

== Distribution and habitat ==
Koenigia alaskana is native to Alaska, the Yukon, and Magadan Oblast in the Russian Far East.

== Cultivation ==
It is cultivated in areas with enough space for its substantial mounds of foliage. Under the name Persicaria alpina it has received the Royal Horticultural Society's Award of Garden Merit.
