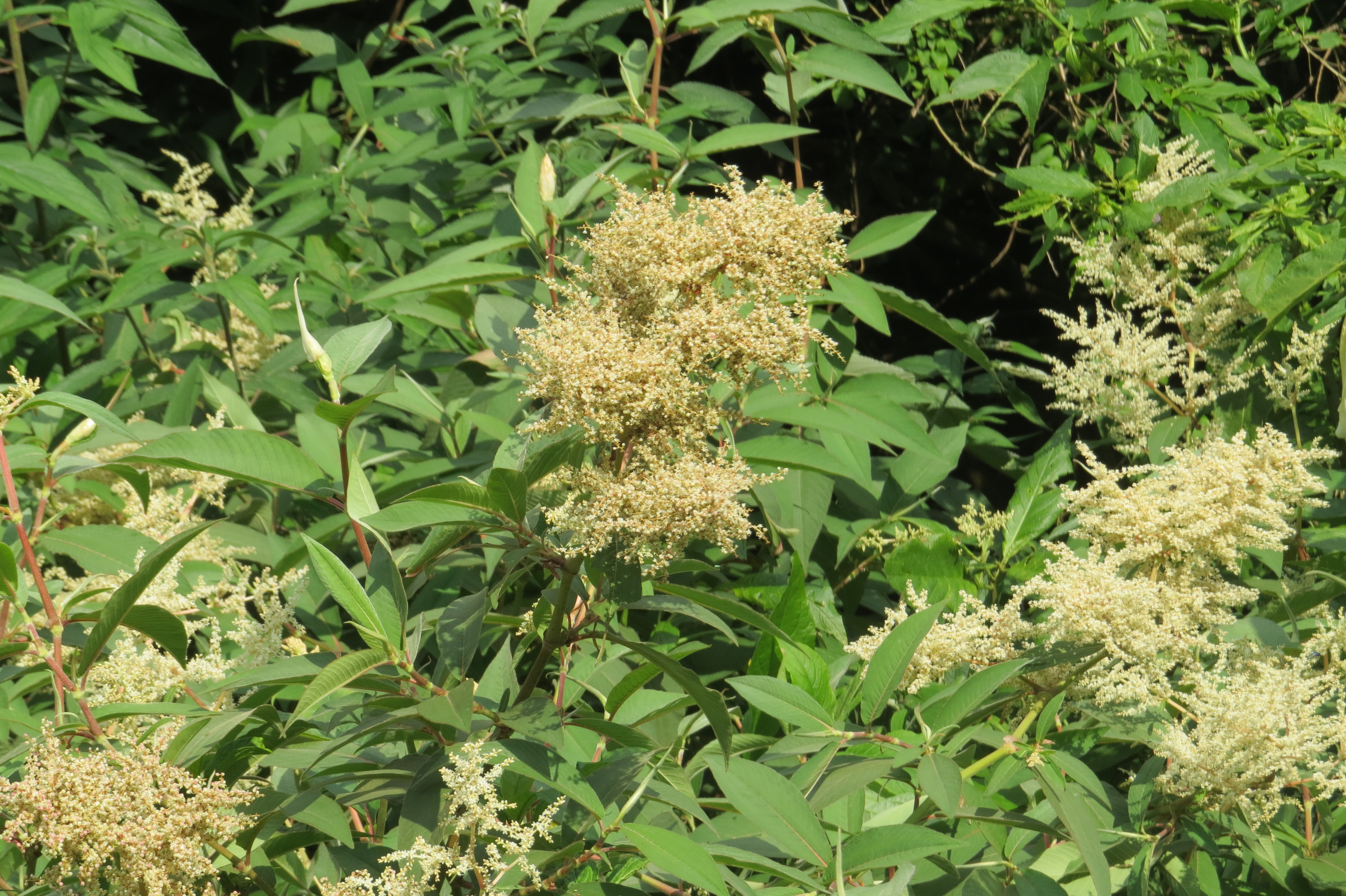

Scientific classification
- Kingdom: Plantae
- Clade: Tracheophytes
- Clade: Angiosperms
- Clade: Eudicots
- Order: Caryophyllales
- Family: Polygonaceae
- Genus: Koenigia
- Species: K. mollis

Binomial name
- Koenigia mollis (D.Don) T.M.Schust. & Reveal

Synonyms
- Aconogonon molle (D.Don) H.Hara; Ampelygonum molle (D.Don) Roberty & Vautier; Coccoloba totnea Buch.-Ham. ex D.Don; Persicaria mollis (D.Don) H.Gross; Polygonum molle D.Don

= Koenigia mollis =

Species of flowering plant

Koenigia mollis is a species of flowering plant in the family Polygonaceae, native to the eastern Himalayas and Myanmar.
