= Tanja Schuster =

Australian botanist

Tanja Magdalena Schuster is a taxonomist from Austria, and the first Pauline Ladiges Plant Systematics Fellow, holding a joint position with the School of Biosciences, University of Melbourne, Victoria, Australia, and the National Herbarium of Victoria, Royal Botanic Gardens Melbourne. Schuster also worked as curator of the Norton-Brown Herbarium at the University of Maryland, College Park.

In 2011, Schuster created the genus Duma for some species previously placed in Muehlenbeckia, but which were shown by molecular phylogenetic studies to form a distinct clade. The name is derived from the Latin for "thorn-bush."

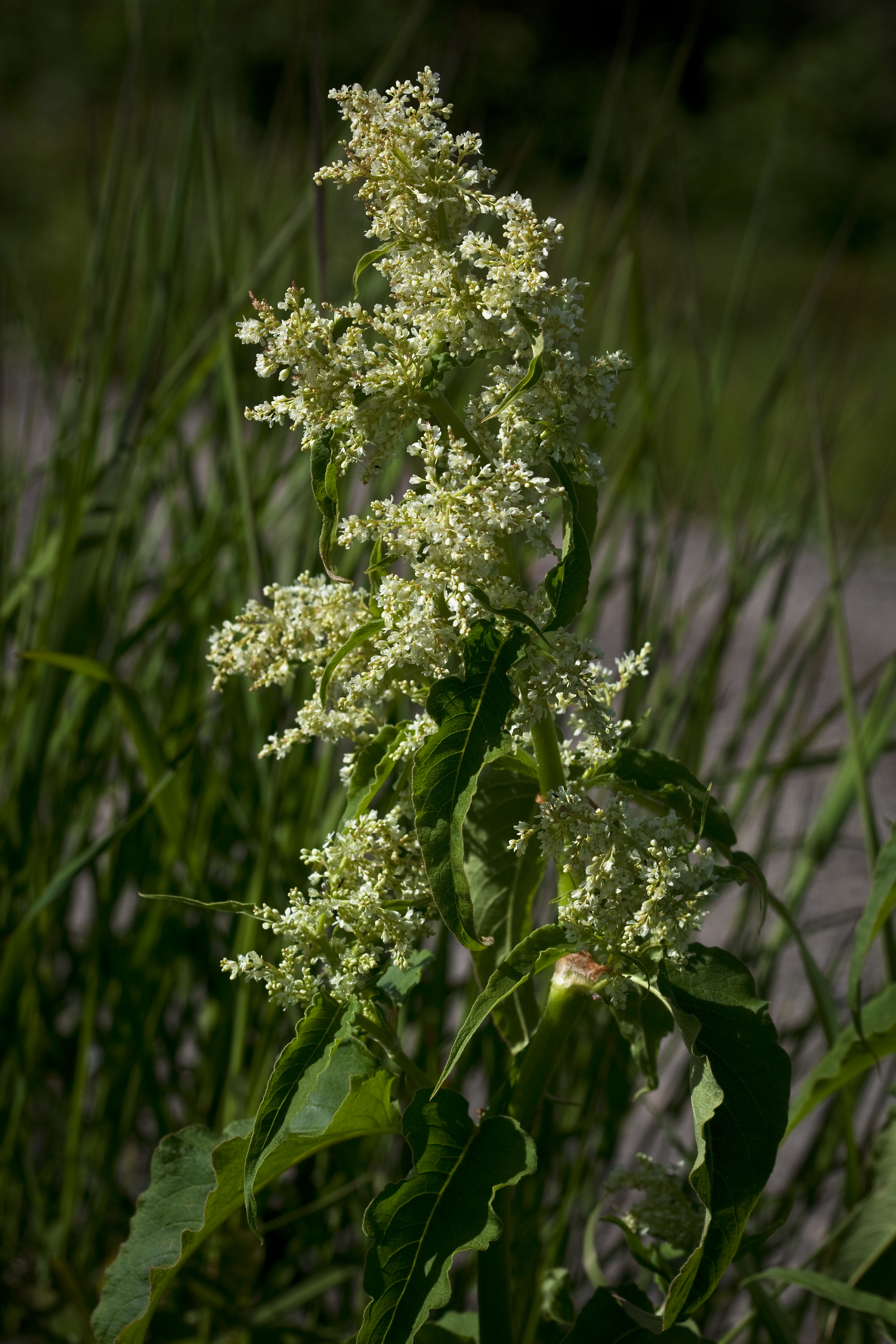
Polygonum alpinum alaskana

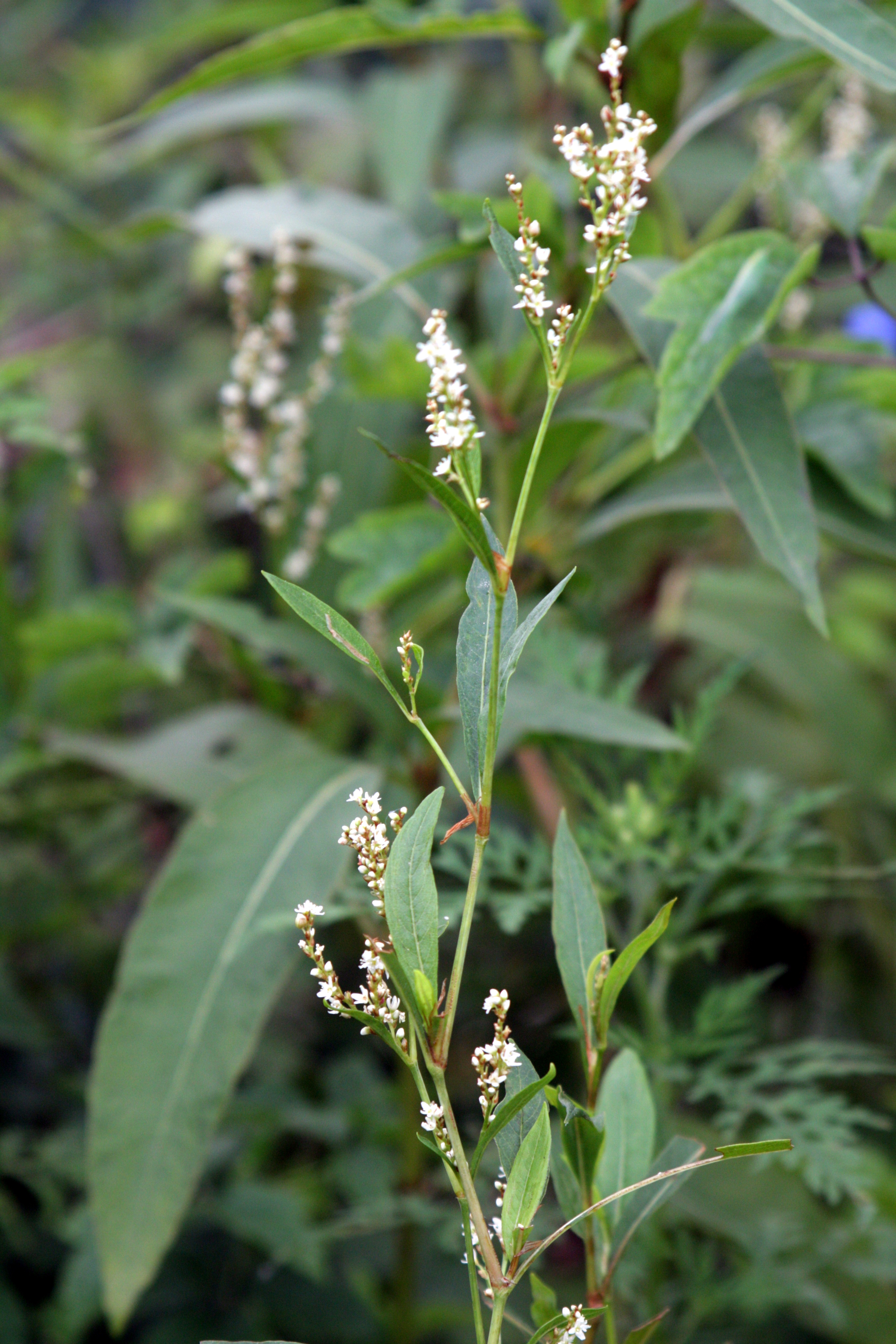
K, alpina

== Selected works ==
- Sanchez, Adriana; Schuster, Tanja M.; Kron, Kathleen A. (2009). "A Large-Scale Phylogeny of Polygonaceae Based on Molecular Data". International Journal of Plant Sciences. 170 (8): 1044–1055. doi:10.1086/605121. S2CID 84694521.
- Sanchez, Adriana; Schuster, Tanja M.; Burke, Janelle M.; Kron, Kathleen A. (2011). "Taxonomy of Polygonoideae (Polygonaceae): A new tribal classification". Taxon. 60: 151–160. doi:10.1002/tax.601013.
- Schuster, Tanja M.; Reveal, James L.; Kron, Kathleen A. (2011). "Phylogeny of Polygoneae (Polygonaceae: Polygonoideae)". Taxon. 60 (6): 1653–1666. doi:10.1002/tax.606010.
- Schuster, Tanja M.; Wilson, Karen L.; Kron, Kathleen A. (2011). "Phylogenetic Relationships of Muehlenbeckia, Fallopia, and Reynoutria (Polygonaceae) Investigated with Chloroplast and Nuclear Sequence Data". International Journal of Plant Sciences. 172 (8): 1053–1066. doi:10.1086/661293. S2CID 84015547.
- Schuster, Tanja M.; Setaro, Sabrina D.; Kron, Kathleen A. (2013). "Age Estimates for the Buckwheat Family Polygonaceae Based on Sequence Data Calibrated by Fossils and with a Focus on the Amphi-Pacific Muehlenbeckia". PLOS ONE. 8 (4) e61261. Bibcode:2013PLoSO...861261S. doi:10.1371/journal.pone.0061261. PMC 3621405. PMID 23585884.

== Taxa authored by Schuster ==
Schuster is listed in the International Plant Names Index as the author or co-author of 62 names, including:

- Duma T.M.Schust.
- Koenigia alaskana T.M.Schust. & Reveal (syn. Polygonum alpinum)
- Koenigia alpina T.M.Schust. & Reveal (syn. Aconogonon alpina)
- Koenigia campanulata (Hook.f.) T.M.Schust. & Reveal (syn. Persicaria campanulata)
- Koenigia davisiae T.M.Schust. & Reveal
