= Polygonum microcephalum =

Polygonum microcephalum can refer to:

- Polygonum microcephalum D.Don (1825), a synonym of Persicaria microcephala (D.Don) H.Gross
- Polygonum microcephalum Hassk. (1831), a synonym of Persicaria nepalensis (Meisn.) H.Gross
